= List of children's museums in the United States =

This is a list of children's museums in the United States.

Name	Town/City	State	Notes
Above & Beyond Children's Museum	Sheboygan	Wisconsin	
A.C. Gilbert's Discovery Village	Salem	Oregon	Named for Alfred Carlton Gilbert, inventor of the Erector Set
Adventure! Children's Museum	Eugene	Oregon	Founded in August 2015
AHA! A Hands-on Adventure	Lancaster	Ohio	Opened in March 2008.
Akron Children’s Museum	Akron	Ohio	Opened in November 2016.
Amazement Square, The Rightmire Children's Museum	Lynchburg	Virginia	Opened in March 2001, the museum is located in the J.W. Wood Building, an antebellum commercial structure listed on the National Register of Historic Buildings.
Ann Arbor Hands-On Museum	Ann Arbor	Michigan	
Arizona Museum for Youth	Mesa	Arizona	Only children's museum in U.S. that focuses on fine art; founded in 1980
Bay Area Discovery Museum	Sausalito	California	Located on National Park land; founded in 1987
Beaumont Children's Museum	Beaumont	Texas	Founded in 2008. Temporarily located at Beaumont Civic Center
Betty Brinn Children's Museum	Milwaukee	Wisconsin	Named for Milwaukee businesswoman Betty Brinn; Opened in 1995
Boonshoft Museum of Discovery	Dayton	Ohio	
Bootheel Youth Museum	Malden	Missouri	
Boston Children's Museum	Boston	Massachusetts	Second oldest children's museum in the U.S.; recognized as LEED Gold certified by the U.S. Green Building Council; founded in 1913
Bronx Children's Museum	The Bronx	New York	Founded in 2005.
Bronzeville Children's Museum	Chicago	Illinois	Only African-American children's museum in the U.S.
Brooklyn Children's Museum	Brooklyn	New York	First museum developed for children; founded in 1899
Buell Children's Museum	Pueblo	Colorado	A program of the Sangre de Cristo Arts Center.
The Building for Kids, Inc.	Appleton	Wisconsin	
Cape Cod Children's Museum	Mashpee	Massachusetts	
Central Wisconsin Children's Museum	Stevens Point	Wisconsin	Opened in 1997.
Chesapeake Children's Museum	Annapolis	Maryland	Founded in 1994.
Chicago Children's Museum	Chicago	Illinois	Located on Navy Pier on Lake Michigan; founded in 1982
Children's Discovery Museum	Normal	Illinois	Founded in 1988.
Children's Discovery Museum	Augusta	Maine	
Children's Discovery Museum of the Desert	Rancho Mirage	California	Founded in 1986.
Children's Discovery Museum of San Jose	San Jose	California	Founded in 1990
Children's Discovery Zone	Norfolk	Nebraska	Located within the Elkhorn Valley Museum and Research Center.
Children's Hands-On Museum	Tuscaloosa	Alabama	Opened in 1986.
Children's Hands-On Museum of Northwest Illinois	Freeport	Illinois	Opened in 2019.
Children's Maritime Museum at Port Jefferson	Port Jefferson	New York	
Children's Museum of Acadiana	Lafayette	Louisiana	Opened in 1996.
Children's Museum of Atlanta	Atlanta	Georgia	
Children's Museum of the Arts	Manhattan	New York	
The Children's Museum of the Brazos Valley	Bryan	Texas	
Children's Museum of Brownsville	Brownsville	Texas	Opened in 2005
Children's Museum of Central Nebraska	Hastings	Nebraska	Opened in 2003
The Children's Museum of Cleveland	Cleveland	Ohio	
The Children's Museum of Denver	Denver	Colorado	Founded in 1973
Children's Museum in Easton	North Easton	Massachusetts	Located in old fire station; founded in 1986
Children's Museum of Eau Claire	Eau Claire	Wisconsin	Opened in 2004
The Children's Museum in Edwardsville	Edwardsville	Illinois	Opened in 2003
Children's Museum of Fond du Lac	Fond du Lac	Wisconsin	Opened in 2007
Children's Museum of Hartford	West Hartford	Connecticut	Fifth oldest children's museum in the U.S.; founded in 1927
Children's Museum of the Highlands	Sebring	Florida	Opened in 1990
Children's Museum at Holyoke	Holyoke	Massachusetts	Founded in 1981 by the Junior League of Holyoke, moved to current location in 1987.
Children's Museum of Houston	Houston	Texas	Founded in 1980; opened new addition in 2009
Children's Museum of Illinois	Decatur	Illinois	
The Children's Museum of Indianapolis	Indianapolis	Indiana	Largest children's museum in the world; founded in 1924
Children's Museum of La Crosse	La Crosse	Wisconsin	
Children's Museum at La Habra	La Habra	California	Located in an historic train depot; opened in 1977
Children's Museum of the Lowcountry	Charleston	South Carolina	
Children's Museum of Maine	Portland	Maine	Founded in 1976
Children's Museum of Manhattan	New York City	New York	
Children's Museum of Memphis	Memphis	Tennessee	Located in former National Guard Armory; opened in 1990
Children's Museum, Missoula	Missoula	Montana	
Children's Museum of Montana	Great Falls	Montana	
The Children's Museum of New Hampshire	Dover	New Hampshire	
The Children's Museum of Northeast Montana	Glasgow	Montana	Opened in 2006
The Children's Museum of Northern Nevada	Carson City	Nevada	
The Children's Museum in Oak Lawn	Oak Lawn	Illinois	
Children's Museum of Oak Ridge	Oak Ridge	Tennessee	Opened in 1973
Children's Museum of the Ohio Valley	Wheeling	West Virginia	
Children's Museum at the Paso Robles Volunteer Firehouse	Paso Robles	California	Founded in 2002
Children's Museum of Phoenix	Phoenix	Arizona	The museum was founded in 1998 as the "Phoenix Family Museum". On June 14, 2008, the museum was renamed "Children's Museum of Phoenix" and opened its doors to the public in the newly remodeled historic (NRHP) Monroe School building where it is currently located.
Children's Museum of Pittsburgh	Pittsburgh	Pennsylvania	Founded in 1983
Children's Museum of Richmond	Richmond	Virginia	Opened in 1981
The Children's Museum of Rose Hill Manor Park	Frederick	Maryland	
The Children's Museum at Saratoga	Saratoga Springs	New York	
The Children's Museum of Science and Technology	Troy	New York	Founded in 1954 by the Junior League, formerly the Junior Museum
Seattle Children's Museum	Seattle	Washington	Founded in 1979
Children's Museum of the Sierra	Oakhurst	California	
Children's Museum of Skagit County	Burlington	Washington	Located in Cascade Mall
The Children's Museum of Sonoma County	Santa Rosa	California	
The Children's Museum of South Carolina	Myrtle Beach	South Carolina	
Children's Museum of South Dakota	Brookings	South Dakota	Created in 2010
Children's Museum of Southeastern Connecticut	Niantic	Connecticut	Created in 1992
Children's Museum of Stockton	Stockton	California	
Children's Museum of Tacoma	Tacoma	Washington	Opened in 1986
Children's Museum of the Treasure Coast	Stuart	Florida	Located in a former chapel and auditorium building in Indian Riverside Park in Jensen Beach; opened in 2008.
Children's Museum Tucson	Tucson	Arizona	
The Children's Museum of the Upstate	Greenville	South Carolina	
Children's Museum of the Valley	Youngstown	Ohio	Opened in 2004
Children's Museum of Virginia	Portsmouth	Virginia	
Children's Museum of Walla Walla	Walla Walla	Washington	
The Children's Museum of Wilmington	Wilmington	North Carolina	
The Children's Museum at Yunker Farm	Fargo	North Dakota	Located in first brick house in the Dakota territory
Children's Neighborhood Museum	Round Lake	Illinois	Part of the Round Lake Area Park District
The Children's Playhouse	Boone	North Carolina	
Children's Science Explorium	Boca Raton	Florida	
Community Children's Museum	Dover	New Jersey	
Connecticut Children's Museum	New Haven	Connecticut	
Cookeville Children's Museum	Cookeville	Tennessee	Opened in 2007
Creative Discovery Museum	Chattanooga	Tennessee	Opened in 1995
Curious Kids' Museum	St. Joseph	Michigan	Located in Veterans Memorial Hall in St. Joseph; founded in 1989
Delaware Children's Museum	Wilmington	Delaware	Located on Wilmington Riverfront
Discovery Center at Murfree Spring	Murfreesboro	Tennessee	
The Discovery Center of the Southern Tier	Binghamton	New York	
Discovery Center Museum	Rockford	Illinois	
Discovery Creek Children's Museum	Washington	District of Columbia	
Discovery Depot Children's Museum	Galesburg	Illinois	
Discovery Gateway	Salt Lake City	Utah	Formerly known as the Children's Museum of Utah
Discovery Museum	Eureka	California	
The Discovery Playhouse	Cape Girardeau	Missouri	
Discovery Science Place	Tyler	Texas	
Don Harrington Discovery Center	Amarillo	Texas	
Duke Energy Children's Museum	Cincinnati	Ohio	
Duluth Children's Museum	Duluth	Minnesota	
DuPage Children's Museum	Naperville	Illinois	
Earlyworks	Huntsville	Alabama	
East Tennessee Discovery Center	Knoxville	Tennessee	
EdVenture Children's Museum	Columbia	South Carolina	Opened in 2003
Escondido Children's Museum	Escondido	California	
expERIEnce Children's Museum	Erie	Pennsylvania	
¡Explora!	Albuquerque	New Mexico	
Exploration Station	Bourbonnais	Illinois	
Exploration Station	Lumberton	North Carolina	
Explorations V Children's Museum	Lakeland	Florida	
Explore & More Children's Museum	East Aurora	New York	
Explorium of Lexington	Lexington	Kentucky	
Family Museum	Bettendorf	Iowa	
Fascinate-U Children's Museum	Fayetteville	North Carolina	
Fingerprints Youth Museum	Hemet	California	
Flint Children's Museum	Flint	Michigan	
FLIP Museum	Hillsboro	Oregon	
Forever Curious Children's Museum	Fennville	Michigan	
Fort Worth Museum of Science and History	Fort Worth	Texas	First children's museum in Texas; founded in 1941
Galveston Children's Museum	Galveston	Texas	Located on Moody Mansion; founded in 2012
Georgia Children's Museum	Macon	Georgia	
Glazer Children's Museum	Tampa	Florida	Opened in 2010. Named after the Glazer Family of the Tampa Bay Area.
Grand Rapids Children's Museum	Grand Rapids	Michigan	
Great Explorations Children's Museum	St. Petersburg	Florida	
Great Lakes Children's Museum	Traverse City	Michigan	
Greensboro Children's Museum	Greensboro	North Carolina	
Gull Wings Children's Museum	Oxnard	California	
Habitot Children's Museum	Berkeley	California	
Hands On! A Child's Gallery	Hendersonville	North Carolina	
Hands On Children's Museum	Olympia	Washington	
Hands-on House Children's Museum	Lancaster	Pennsylvania	
Hannah Lindahl Children's Museum	Mishawaka	Indiana	
Harrisonburg Children's Museum	Harrisonburg	Virginia	Opened in 2003
Hawaii Children's Discovery Center	Honolulu	Hawaii	
Healthworks! Kids' Museum	South Bend	Indiana	
Imaginarium of South Texas	Laredo	Texas	Opened in 1991
Imagination Place	Gadsden	Alabama	
The Imagination Workshop, Temecula's Children's Museum	Temecula	California	
Imagine Children's Museum	Everett	Washington	
Imagine Nation Children's Museum	Bristol	Connecticut	
ImagineU Children's Museum	Visalia	California	
ImaginOn: The Joe & Joan Martin Center	Charlotte	North Carolina	Opened in 2005
Impression 5 Science Center	Lansing	Michigan	
Interactive Neighborhood for Kids	Gainesville	Georgia	
The Iowa Children's Museum	Coralville	Iowa	
Jasmine Moran Children's Museum	Seminole	Oklahoma	
Science Museum Oklahoma	Oklahoma City	Oklahoma	One of the largest Children's Museums in the nation - CurioCity - is located within Science Museum Oklahoma
Jeanes Discovery Center	Waco	Texas	Located within Baylor University's Mayborn Museum Complex;
The Jersey Explorer Children's Museum	East Orange	New Jersey	
Kaleideum	Winston-Salem	North Carolina	The Children's Museum of Winston-Salem and SciWorks merged in July 2016, and the new entity was named Kaleideum in February 2017.
Kaleidoscope (Kansas City, Missouri)	Kansas City	Missouri	
Kearney Area Children's Museum	Kearney	Nebraska	
Kern County Museum	Bakersfield	California	
Kidcity Children's Museum	Middletown	Connecticut	
Kidscommons	Columbus	Indiana	
Kidsenses, Inc.	Rutherfordton	North Carolina	
Kidsfirst Children's Museum	South Bend	Indiana	
Kids 'N' Stuff	Albion	Michigan	
Kidspace Children's Museum	Pasadena	California	
KidsQuest Children's Museum	Bellevue	Washington	
Kid Time! Discovery Experience	Medford	Oregon	
The Kidzeum	Grenada	Mississippi	
Kidzone Museum	Truckee	California	
Kidzu Children's Museum	Chapel Hill	North Carolina	Founded in March 2006
Koch Family Children's Museum of Evansville	Evansville	Indiana	
Kohl Children's Museum	Glenview	Illinois	
Liberty Science Center	Jersey City	New Jersey	
Lied Discovery Children's Museum	Las Vegas	Nevada	
Lincoln Children's Museum	Lincoln	Nebraska	First green building in Lincoln
Long Island Children's Museum	Garden City	New York	
Louisiana Children's Discovery Center	Hammond	Louisiana	
Louisiana Children's Museum	New Orleans	Louisiana	
Lutz Children's Museum	Manchester	Connecticut	
Lynn Meadows Discovery Center	Gulfport	Mississippi	
Madison Children's Museum	Madison	Wisconsin	Opened in 1991
The Magic House, St. Louis Children's Museum	St. Louis	Missouri	Opened in 1979
Maine Discovery Museum	Bangor	Maine	
Marbles Kids Museum	Raleigh	North Carolina	
McKenna Children's Museum	New Braunfels	Texas	
Miami Children's Museum	Miami	Florida	
Mid-Hudson Children's Museum	Poughkeepsie	New York	
Mid-Michigan Children's Museum	Saginaw	Michigan	
Minnesota Children's Museum	St. Paul	Minnesota	
Mississippi Children's Museum	Jackson	Mississippi	
Mobius Kids	Spokane	Washington	Part of Mobius Spokane
Monterey Youth Museum	Monterey	California	
The Most (Museum Of Science & Technology)	Syracuse	New York	
Mountain Top Children's Museum	Breckenridge	Colorado	
MOXI, The Wolf Museum of Exploration + Innovation	Santa Barbara	California	Opened on February 25, 2017
My Jewish Discovery Place	Fort Lauderdale	Florida	
National Children's Museum	Washington	District of Columbia	Founded in 1974 as the 'Capital Children's Museum'.
National Museum of Play	Rochester	New York	Second largest children's museum in the country
The New Children's Museum	San Diego	California	
Northeast Louisiana Children's Museum	Monroe	Louisiana	Opened on August 15, 1998; planning to move to a different location at Swayze Natatorium at Forsythe Park in 2021
Northeast Texas Children's Museum	Commerce	Texas	Located within Texas A&M University-Commerce; opened in 2002
North Platte Area Children's Museum	North Platte	Nebraska	
Northwoods Children's Museum	Eagle River	Wisconsin	
Omaha Children's Museum	Omaha	Nebraska	Founded in 1976
Orpheum Children's Science Museum	Champaign	Illinois	
Our World, Children's Global Discovery Museum	Cohasset	Massachusetts	
Pennypickle's Workshop	Temecula	California	
Phelps Youth Pavilion	Waterloo	Iowa	
Please Touch Museum	Philadelphia	Pennsylvania	Located within Memorial Hall, which was built for the 1876 Centennial Exposition
Port Discovery	Baltimore	Maryland	
Portland Children's Museum	Portland	Oregon	Sixth oldest children's museum in the United States
Pretend City Children's Museum	Irvine	California	
Providence Children's Museum	Providence	Rhode Island	Rhode Island's first and only children's museum
Raven Hill Discovery Center	Boyne City	Michigan	Established in 1991
Sacramento Children's Museum	Sacramento	California	Opened in 2011
San Antonio Children's Museum	San Antonio	Texas	Opened in 1995
The Sandbox	Hilton Head Island	South Carolina	
Sandcastles Children's Museum	Ludington	Michigan	Opened in 2007
San Luis Obispo Children's Museum	San Luis Obispo	California	
Santa Fe Children's Museum	Santa Fe	New Mexico	
Schoolhouse Children's Museum and Learning Center	Boynton Beach	Florida	
Science and Discovery Center of Northwest Florida	Panama City	Florida	
Science City at Union Station	Kansas City	Missouri	Founded in 1999
Seminole County School Student Museum	Sanford	Florida	
Shenandoah Valley Discovery Museum	Winchester	Virginia	
St. George Children's Museum	St.George	Utah	Opened in 2013
Staten Island Children's Museum	Staten Island	New York	
Stepping Stones Museum for Children	Norwalk	Connecticut	
Texoma Children's Museum	Denison	Texas	
The Thinkery	Austin	Texas	Opened in 1987; formerly Austin Children's Museum; opening December 2013
T.R.E.E. House Children's Museum	Alexandria	Louisiana	
Treehouse Children's Museum	Ogden	Utah	Opened in 1992
Upper Peninsula Children's Museum	Marquette	Michigan	
Utica Children's Museum	Utica	New York	Founded in October 1963 by the Junior League, formerly The Children's Museum of History, Natural History & Science
Virginia Discovery Museum	Charlottesville	Virginia	
Westchester Children's Museum	Rye	New York	
Wizard of Oz Museum	Cape Canaveral	Florida	Founded 2022, features a large collection of Wizard of Oz memorabilia and historical artifacts. Ranked #7 out of 580 children's museums in the United States.
WonderLab Museum of Science, Health & Technology	Bloomington	Indiana	
Wonderfeet Kids Museum	Rutland	Vermont	
Wonderscope Children's Museum of Kansas City	Kansas City	Missouri	
Wonder Works	Oak Park	Illinois	
The Virgin Islands Children's Museum	St Thomas	United States Virgin Islands	Founded 2015, serves all islands in the USVI territory.
The Woodlands Children's Museum	The Woodlands	Texas	
Working Wonders Children's Museum	Bend	Oregon	
World Awareness Children's Museum	Glen Falls, New York	New York	Created in 1995
WOW! Children's Museum	Lafayette	Colorado	
Young at Art Museum	Davie	Florida	
Zimmer Children's Museum	Los Angeles	California	

== See also ==
- Children's museum
- Science museum
- List of nature centers in the United States
