= Stepping Stones Museum for Children =

Children's museum in Connecticut, US

Coordinates: 41.11°N 73.4179°W

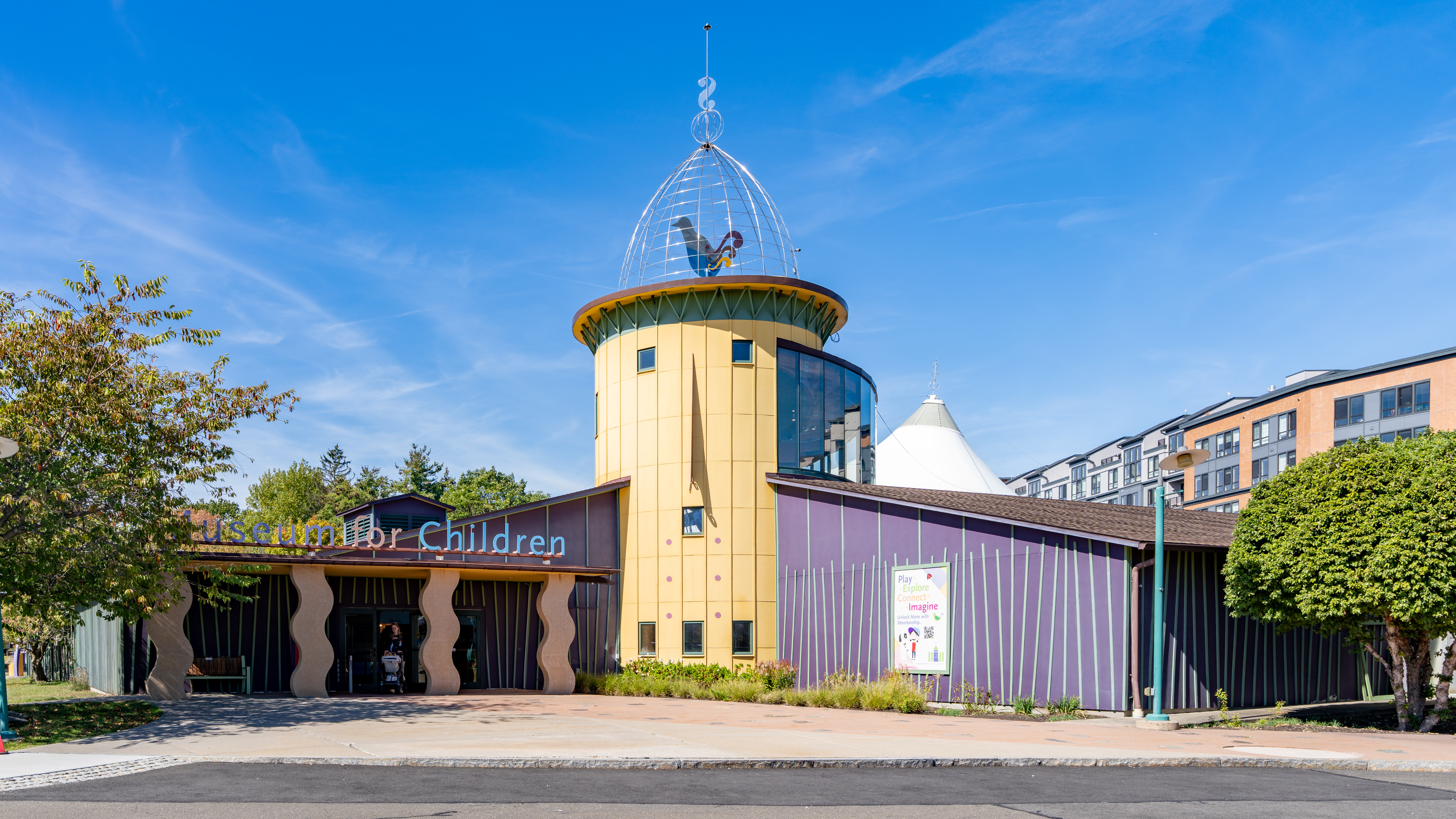
- (2025)
- Established: 2000
- Location: 303 West Avenue; Norwalk, Connecticut, United States
- Type: Children's museum
- Website: www.steppingstonesmuseum.org

The Stepping Stones Museum for Children is a hands-on museum specifically designed for children aged 10 and under. It is situated at 303 West Avenue within the Central district of Norwalk, Connecticut.

It features various interactive exhibit areas, including a theater, a broadcast studio, and a high-definition screen.

Within the entrance lobby stands the ColorCoaster, a kinetic sculpture spanning 27 feet (8.2 m), made by the artist George Rhoads.

In the museum's surroundings is a garden with three kinetic energy sculptures. These sculptures, conceived by Beinfield Architecture, harness local sources of solar, wind, and water energy.

== History ==
Stepping Stones Museum for Children was established in 2000 under the guidance of Gigi Priebe. In its inaugural decade of operation, the museum garnered two million visits.

In 2010, the museum underwent an extensive renovation project with a budget of $17 million. This undertaking necessitated the closure of Stepping Stones for roughly three months, culminating in a "grand reopening" on November 20, 2010. This initiative facilitated the expansion of the museum's interior space by approximately 22,000 square feet (2,000 m^{2}), effectively doubling the facility's available indoor area. The redesign, a brainchild of Beinfield Architecture, not only magnified the museum's physical dimensions but also cultivated a naturally efficient workspace that was aligned with principles of sustainable energy. The endeavor was characterized by the integration of recycled materials procured from local sources. A notable aspect of the expansion encompassed the construction of a forty-foot screen multi-media theater and communication facility. Additionally, an internal telescope was incorporated to facilitate the observation of plant and animal life atop the facility's roof.

== See also ==
Color Coaster by George Rhoads

- The Children's Museum
- Children's Museum of Southeastern Connecticut
- Connecticut Children's Museum
- Connecticut Science Center
- Discovery Museum and Planetarium
- Eli Whitney Museum
- List of museums in Connecticut
- Maritime Aquarium at Norwalk
