= FLIP Museum =

- Logo
- Location: Hillsboro, Oregon, United States
- Type: Children's museum
- Website: flipmuseum.org

The FLIP Museum is a children's museum in Hillsboro, Oregon, United States. It focuses on art, culture, and STEM.

== History ==
The children's museum started as mobile operation in 2022, then became a brick-and-mortar establishment in downtown Hillsboro in December 2024. In 2026, the museum announced plans to open a new location in downtown Portland in 2027. It is slated to operate in a 22,000-square-foot space at Southwest Washington Street and Sixth Avenue, near the James Beard Public Market.

Melissa Hong was a board member in 2023 and the executive director in 2024.

== See also ==
- List of children's museums in the United States
- List of museums in Oregon
