= Children's Museum of Atlanta =

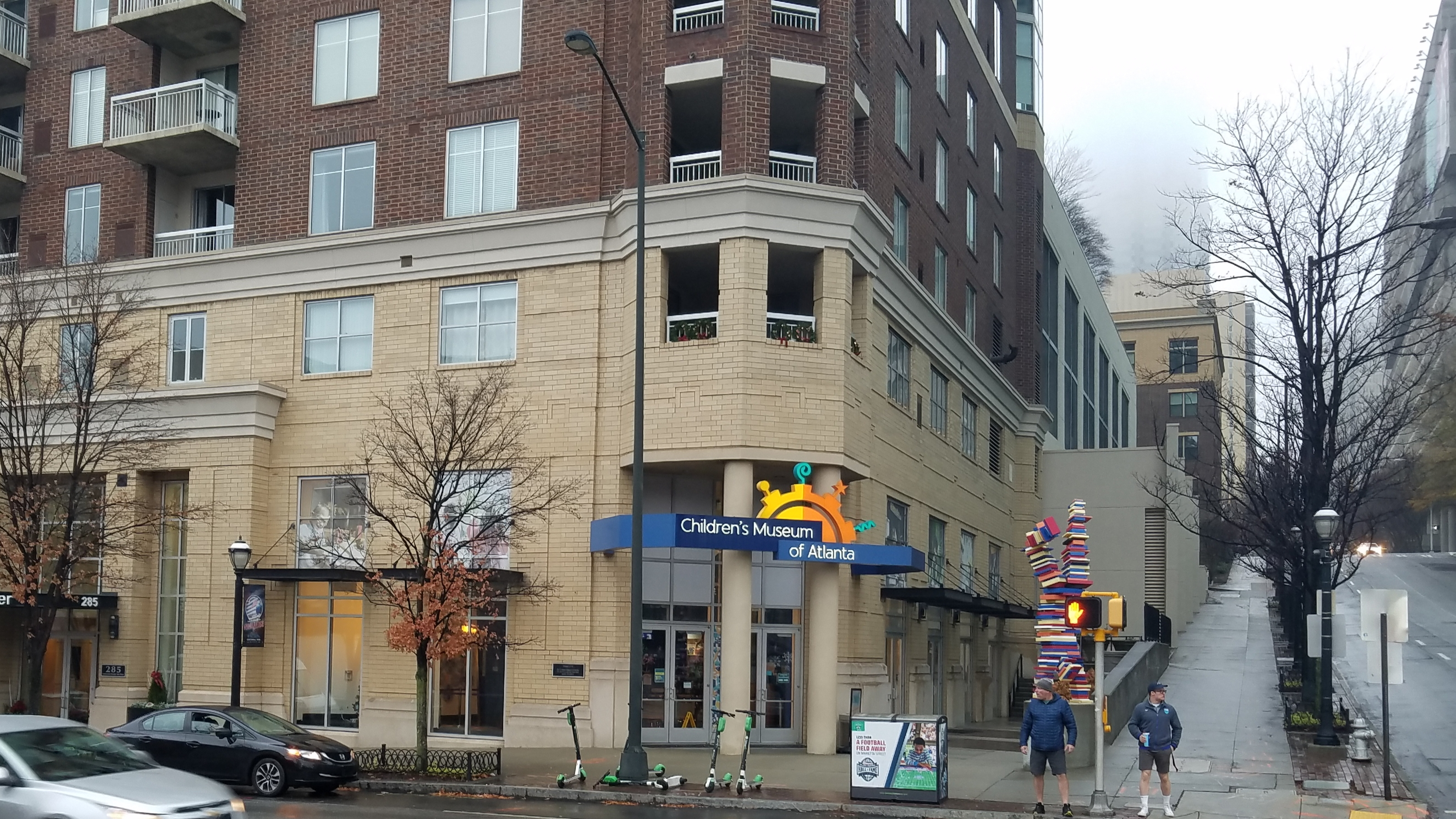
- The museum in 2019

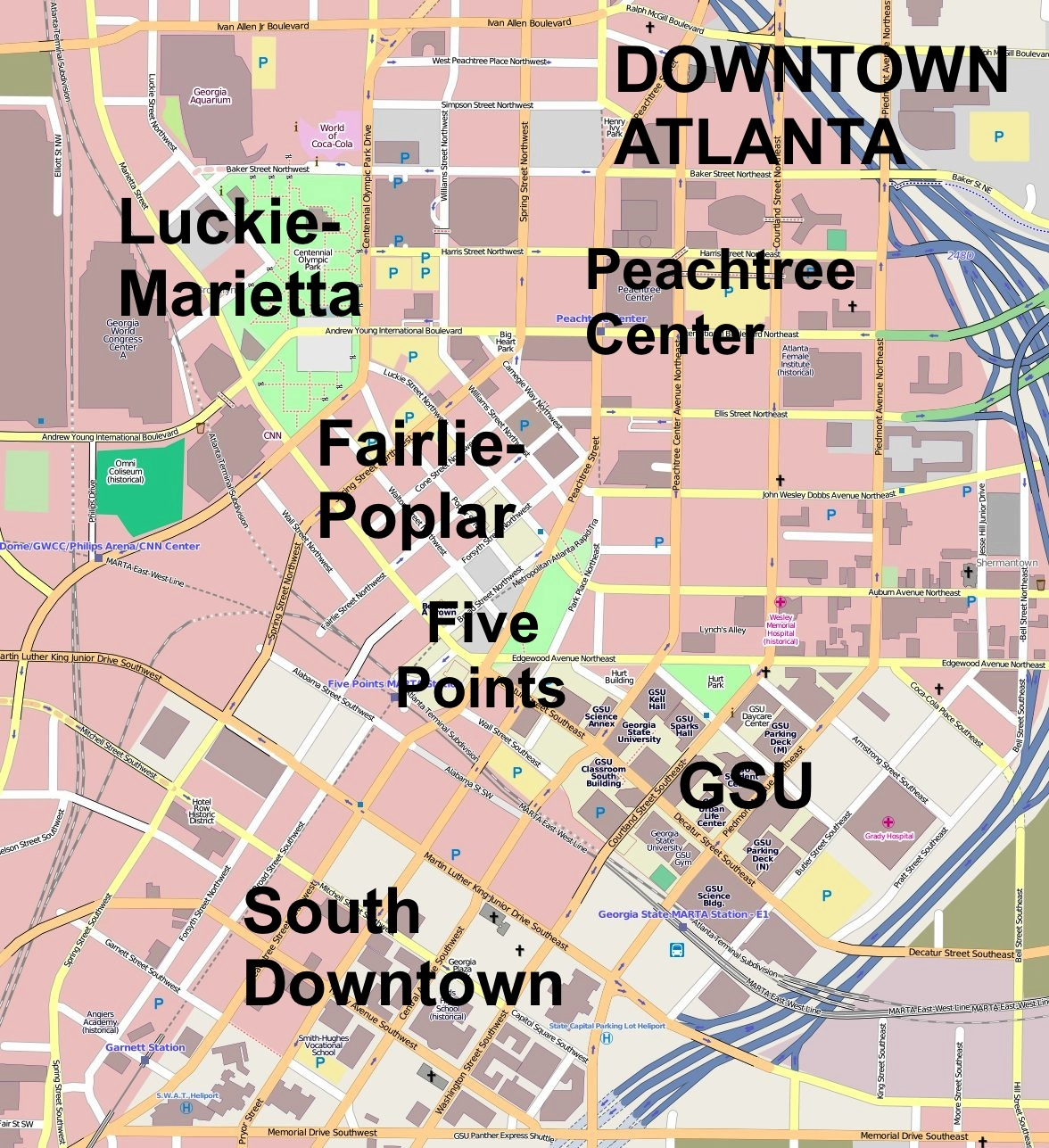
- Location within Downtown Atlanta Location within Atlanta Location within Georgia Location within the United States
- Former name: Imagine It! The Children's Museum of Atlanta
- Established: 2003
- Location: 275 Centennial Olympic Park Drive, Atlanta, Georgia, U.S.
- Coordinates: 33.762106°N 84.391468°W
- Type: Children's museum
- Director: Edwin Link
- Website: The Children's Museum of Atlanta

The Children's Museum of Atlanta (known as "Imagine It! The Children's Museum of Atlanta" from 2003 to 2011) is a children's museum located in Atlanta, Georgia. Founded in 1988 as a "Museum Without Walls," the museum opened to the public in 2003. The museum is located Downtown, adjacent to Centennial Olympic Park. The 16,316-square-foot museum, one of four children's museums in Georgia, includes exhibits designed for and geared toward children under the age of nine and hosts field trips from schools and learning centers throughout North Georgia.

The Imaginators, the museum's troupe of professional actors, guide field trip groups through the museum, invent fun hands-on activities for children, and create terrific programming, including original and lively 20-minute mini-musicals, which are frequently themed to tie in with the featured traveling exhibit. The Imaginators connect play and learning in a fun way.

== History ==
For its first fifteen years, the Children's Museum of Atlanta was a "Museum Without Walls." In 1999, then-executive director Pat Turner wrote, "There is no edifice for the children's museum. While planning for a facility, the staff developed programs to help young people think about their community and about the role they have in it ... The community is the museum." (Gibans & Beach, 1999, p. 123–24) The facility, located in the ground floor of Museum Tower, opened to the public in March, 2003. It celebrated its tenth birthday over the weekend of March 2–3, 2013, with special events and a giant birthday card. The museum temporarily closed on August 1, 2015, to undergo an $8.2 million renovation. The museum added a 3,000-square-foot second-story mezzanine, a two-story climbing structure and many other permanent exhibits. The museum reopened on December 12, 2015.

== Exhibits ==
The permanent exhibits include Fundamentally Food, which allows children to role play through the cultivation of food at a farm, its delivery to a grocery store, and consumption in a home kitchen, Tools for Solutions, the centerpiece of which is a machine that, using corkscrews and cranes, transports balls through a series of tracks, and Leaping into Learning, a small play area for guests younger than five, Let Your Creativity Flow, an area devoted to the arts, complete with an art studio, a paint wall and a stage for performances, Gateway to the World, which is devoted to teaching children about geography, topography, and culture.

=== The Morph Gallery ===
The museum typically hosts three traveling exhibits per year in a 2500-square-foot section called The Morph Gallery.

- A T. Rex Named Sue - October 4, 2003 – January 5, 2004
- Birthdays Around the World - February 5-April 18, 2004
- The Monkey King - July 24, 2004 – November 1, 2004
- Tummy Town - November 13, 2004 – February 20, 2005
- Spring Into the Arts - March 4, 2005 – June 23, 2005
- The Shoes We Use - June 25, 2005 – September 15, 2005
- Arthur's World - October 29, 2005 – February 15, 2006
- Critters - February 25, 2006 – April 8, 2006
- Take a Deep Breath! - April 22, 2006 – June 18, 2006
- Night Journeys - July 1, 2006 – October 26, 2006
- Little Hands, Big Difference - November 18, 2006 – February 25, 2007
- Can You Tell Me How to Get to Sesame Street? - March 31, 2007 – September 9, 2007
- Alice's Wonderland - September 29, 2007 – January 23, 2008
- Wild About Plants: The Plant Adventures of Flora Wild - January 26, 2008 – April 27, 2008
- Under the Big Top: You're the Ringmaster! - May 17, 2008 – September 14, 2008
- The Amazing Castle - January 24, 2009 – May 26, 2009
- Exploring Trees: Inside & Out - June 13, 2009 – September 13, 2009
- Curious George: Let's Get Curious! - October 10, 2009 – January 24, 2010
- Cyberchase: the Chase is on! - February 13, 2010 – May 31, 2010
- Conservation Quest - July 1, 2010 – Mid-September 2010
- Making America's Music - October 2, 2010 – January 9, 2011
- From Here to Timbuktu: A Journey Through West Africa - February 5 – May 31, 2011
- Team Up! Explore Science & Sports - June 11 – September 18, 2011
- Once Upon a Time: Exploring the World of Fairy Tales - October 1, 2011 – January 22, 2012
- Adventures with Clifford, The Big Red Dog™ - February 4 – May 6, 2012
- The Big Adventure - May 26 – September 9, 2012
- The Magic School Bus Kicks Up a Storm - October 6, 2012 – January 27, 2013
- Body Carnival: The Fun & Science of Being You! - February 9 – May 27, 2013
- Weebles Coast to Coast - June 8 – September 8, 2013
- Moneyville - September 28, 2013 – January 12, 2014
- Sonic Sensation - February 15 – May 28, 2014
- Outside the Box - June 14, 2014 – January 26, 2015
- Super Kids Saves the World - February 7 – May 3, 2015
- Once Upon a Time: Exploring the World of Fairy Tales - May 16 – July 26, 2015
- Mystery of the Mayan Medallion - February 6 – May 31, 2016
- XOXO: An Exhibit About Love & Forgiveness – June 8 – September 4, 2016
- Magic Tree House – September 24, 2016 – January 16, 2017
- From Here to There – January 28 – May 29, 2017
- Blue Man Group: Making Waves – June 10 – September 4, 2017
- Sid the Science Kid: The Super-Duper Exhibit – September 16, 2017 – January 15, 2018
- Daniel Tiger's Neighborhood: A Grr-ific Exhibit – September 22, 2018 – January 6, 2019
- Run, Jump, Fly! Adventures in Action! – January 19 - May 27, 2019
- Doc McStuffins The Exhibit – June 8 - September 8, 2019
- Curious George: Let's Get Curious! - September 21, 2019 - January 5, 2020
- Teenage Mutant Ninja Turtles Secrets of the Sewer - January 18 - June 7, 2020
- The Pigeon comes to Atlanta!: A Mo Willems Exhibit - January 16 - May 9, 2021
- Thomas Edison's Secret Lab - May 22 - September 7, 2021
- Rube Goldberg: The World of Hilarious Invention - September 18, 2021 - January 2, 2022
- Storyland: A Trip Through Childhood Favorites - January 15 - May 30, 2022
- Wild Kratts: Creature Power! - June 11 - September 5, 2022
- PAW Patrol: Adventure Play - September 24, 2022 - January 8, 2023
- Wallace & Gromit: Get Cracking! - September 21, 2024 - January 12, 2025

== See also ==
- List of children's museums in the United States
