= Upper Peninsula Children's Museum =

Children's Museum in Marquette, Michigan

- Established: March 1997
- Location: 123 W Baraga Ave, Marquette, Michigan, US
- Coordinates: 46.540519°N 87.394522°W
- Type: Children's museum
- Visitors: 40,000 (2011)
- Executive director: Jessica Hanley
- Curator: Jim Edwards
- Employees: 20
- Parking: On site
- Website: upchildrensmuseum.org

The Upper Peninsula Children's Museum (UPCM) is a nonprofit children's museum in Marquette, Michigan, in the United States. The interactive museum features numerous exhibits that were designed by children to combine play with art, health, science, communication, and the local Upper Peninsula environment.

== History ==
In the late 1980s, a group of Marquette County citizens formed the first board of directors to plan the creation of what would become the Upper Peninsula Children's Museum. The group hosted hands-on design workshops for families across the Upper Peninsula during the early 1990s, working directly with children to design each of the exhibits. Named "designasaurus," the workshops led directly to the creation of the first museum's first three exhibit halls: The Fantastic Forest, Micro-Society, and Over the Air. A few years later in 2002, early construction was completed on what would become The Human Body exhibit hall. The first phase featured a crawl-through, climbable health exhibit and an intestine-themed slide.

The Over the Air exhibit hall has received numerous updates and new exhibits in recent years. In 2018, local news station WLUC-TV6 renovated their newsroom and donated materials including the former news desk to the museum. The UPCM used their donation to create an updated kids news station with a green screen that allows visitors to choose from several different backgrounds for their broadcasts, including a local weather map. In June 2021, the UPCM unveiled a live bee exhibit in partnership with a local beekeeping club. In addition to providing educational information about insect life cycles and communication, the observation station gives viewers the opportunity to see the aspects of a working honeybee hive that are otherwise hidden from human sight. The honeybee hive is set behind a glass window, connected to several bee transparent tubes. In May 2022, the museum opened another new area within Over the Air, this time in collaboration with the Marquette Board of Light and Power and the Ann Arbor Hands-On Museum. The Pedal Power exhibit features a light board powered by two pedal bikes, providing children with the opportunity to understand electricity via experiential learning.

=== Location ===
In 1991, the Upper Peninsula Children's Museum purchased a former cold storage warehouse building in downtown Marquette that continues to house the museum today. The main museum space is housed on the top floor of the warehouse in an area spanning over 15,000 square feet (1,400 m^{2}). The majority of the building's first floor generates revenue to support the museum by serving as rentable space for a variety of nonprofits, offices, and specialty shops.

In the decades since its founding, the area around the UPCM has become increasingly popular. In addition to several cafes and small businesses, the Marquette Regional History Center, Ore Dock Brewing Co., Father Marquette Park, St. Peter Cathedral are all within walking distance of the museum. The downtown MarqTran passenger transfer station is only a block away, providing easy access to the UPCM via public transportation.

== Exhibits ==
All of the exhibits at the Upper Peninsula Children's Museum emphasize play, art, imagination, and education. All exhibits are the result of direct input from children and families.

All Aboard! is a multi-story model railroad exhibit that depicts an Upper Peninsula mining scene. It's housed in a large glass enclosure near the museum's entrance.

Micro-Society is a kid-sized city street lined with themed imaginative play areas. Beginning with a mechanic's garage and ending with a supermarket, the Micro-Society exhibit features a decommissioned ambulance, mini fire station, dinosaur-themed café, bank, theater, post office, and beauty salon. In 2022, the UPCM began a fundraising campaign to update and rename the Micro-Society to Nheena's Neighborhood in recognition of the commitment of the museum's first executive director Nheena Weyer Ittner.

Mini Landmark Inn is a children's edition of the nearby, historic Landmark Inn. Sponsored by the Landmark and designed and built by NMU Construction management students, the exhibit features both a reception area and a hotel room, with room to use the miniature luggage cart in between.

Over The Air is an exhibit hall showcasing everything in the air, from electricity and weather to planes and insects. Children can check their luggage at the airport to board the cockpit of a real jet, direct planes from the air traffic control, learn about energy and electricity with kid-powered lightbulbs, and give weather reports from the miniature news station.

The Human Body exhibit hall features numerous climbable exhibits that encourage young visitors to learn about different parts of the human body. Children can climb into a human head through an ear-shaped door, scale the skin climbing wall, or crawl into the heart to listen to different heartbeats.

The Fantastic Forest is centered around a huge tree that's surrounded by several smaller habitat themed exhibits. Small visitors can crawl into the home at the base of the tree and anyone can ascend the staircase to a large bird nest balcony at the top. Creature Kingdom is a large, kid-made touch tank environment within The Fantastic Forest that offers hands-on interaction with turtles, snakes, reptiles, and more. The animals living in Creature Kingdom are fed fresh produce that is donated by local grocery stores.

Where's Your Water? is an exhibit about water conservation housed in a crooked house. Children can learn about the water cycle, flush themselves down a giant toilet slide, and create sculptures with donated recycled materials.

Wonderground is an archaeological dig experience that allows children to crawl into a cave to dig for fossils and then climb up to sit in the cab of a mining dump truck.

== Programs ==
During the school year, the UPCM offers weekday morning programing for toddlers and after school and weekend programming for elementary students. They host a themed activity night after-hours for children of all ages once a month. The museum also hosts free classes and workshops for parents and caregivers. The UPCM regularly collaborates with local family-based and educational organizations including Northern Michigan University, Shiras Planetarium, and Peter White Public Library.

The Upper Peninsula Children's Museum celebrated its 25th anniversary in March 2022. The museum hosts several annual events including a children's New Year's Eve ball-drop, local celebrity art auction, and Culinary Journey, a major fundraising event that features the food of dozens of local vendors and restaurateurs.

=== 8 – 18 Media ===
Designed for local students between the ages of eight eighteen, 8 – 18 Media is a youth journalism group hosted by the Upper Peninsula Children's Museum. The group covers current issues, and regularly publishes their work both in the local newspaper The Mining Journal and broadcast on local radio stations Q107-WMQT and WNMU-PR90. The kid reporters regularly travel for stories in addition to covering local events, and have covered every political convention since 1992. The program also provides children and teenagers with the opportunity to create, record, and share their own podcasts. In early 2022, an average of 30 students were involved in the 8 – 18 Media program.

=== Kid Bizness ===
Launched in 2010 with 12 participants, the Kid Bizness program supports children age 7 to 17 who are interested in starting their own business. The program offers training and other support to young entrepreneurs and provides them with a space to market and sell their wares in a dedicated section of the museum's retail space.

=== Guardians of WOW ===
The Guardians of WOW program trains older children and teenagers to volunteer at the UPCM. After completing the required training and orientation, kids from 8 to 18 can register in the program. Guardians are provided with a variety of ways to volunteer in the museum, from managing the resident animals to assisting in the development of new educational programs and exhibits. Their main responsibility is to help younger children, families, and visitors interact with the exhibits and enjoy their visit to the museum.

== Operations ==
The Upper Peninsula Children's Museum was granted 501(c)(3) status in 1995. As of 2011, the UPCM served 40,000 visitors annually with a budget of approximately $400,000. It is operated by donations and supported by funding and grants from numerous organizations including the Michigan Arts and Culture Council, the National Endowment for the Arts, Michigan Council for Arts and Cultural Affairs, and the Upper Peninsula Arts and Culture Alliance.

The Upper Peninsula Children Museum's board of directors consists of 12 members led by a president, vice president, treasurer, and secretary. In 2022, the museum's first executive director and founding board member, Nheena Weyer Ittner, retired. Former Marquette city commissioner Jessica Hanley was hired as her replacement.

=== Accessibility ===
A spaceship themed elevator provides access to the children's museum on the second story of the building. The museum features numerous wheelchair-accessible ramps, and nearly all exhibits can be fully experienced by those who use mobility aids. Once a month, an afternoon specifically for those with disabilities and/or unique sensory needs is offered at the museum. No music is played during these events and all overhead lights are dimmed in an effort to make the environment more accessible.

The museum encourages donations towards the sponsorship of memberships for low-income families, who can receive memberships at no cost through the playmaker program. During the 2018–2019 United States federal government shut-down, the UPCM offered free admission and birthday party celebrations to the children of furloughed government workers.

The UPCM engages in environmentally-friendly and sustainable building operations. The majority of the furniture, carpets, toys, and other supplies used in the building have been repurposed, and all lighting features LED energy efficient lightbulbs.

=== Recognition ===
In 2003, the Upper Peninsula Children's Museum was the cultural organization selected to receive the Governor's Award for Arts and Culture from former Michigan Governor Jennifer Granholm. In 2011, then-Governor Rick Snyder awarded the museum with the Reinventing Michigan Award in recognition of its "innovative education methods." The UPCM's 8–18 Media program has received the Excellence in Broadcasting award from the Michigan Association of Broadcasters.
