= Rain activated art =

Rain-activated art, also known as Rainworks by the creator Peregrine Church, is a kind of street art that utilizes a superhydrophobic coating which becomes visible under rain. The invisible, non-toxic and water-based spray lasts up to four months on sidewalks. As of March 2015, there are approximately 25 installations in Seattle, supported by a grant from Awesome Foundation, and several more commissioned pieces at and around the Hands On Children's Museum in Olympia, Washington. Church started creating the works in Seattle in May, 2014.
