= Children's Museum of Evansville =

Museum in Evansville, Indiana, US

- Central Library
- U.S. National Register of Historic Places
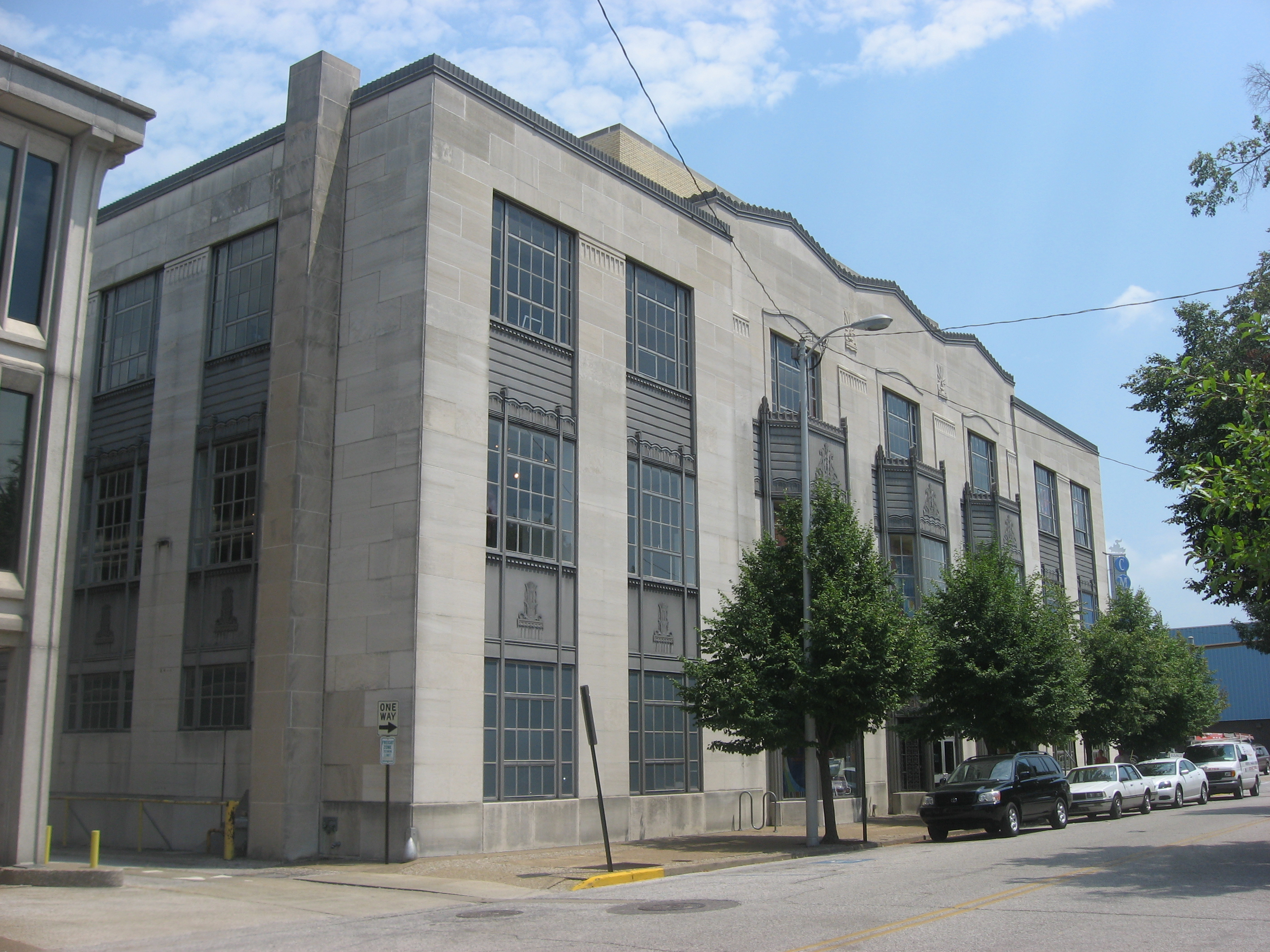
- The museum

- Location within Indiana Location within the United States
- Location: 22 SE. 5th St., Evansville, Indiana
- Coordinates: 37°58′17″N 87°34′9″W
- Area: Less than 1 acre (0.40 ha)
- Built: 1931
- Architect: H.E. Boyle Associates; Walker and Weeks
- Architectural style: Art Deco
- MPS: Downtown Evansville MRA
- NRHP reference No.: 82000086
- Added to NRHP: July 1, 1982

The Koch Family Children's Museum of Evansville is an interactive children's museum in Evansville, Indiana. The museum educates and inspires children about the world. Exhibits include deconstructing objects, a water exhibit that spans multiple floors, experiences about the human body and its senses, and a gallery for freedom of expression.

Built inside the historic old Central Library, the museum opened in September 2006. The Art Deco building is listed on the National Register of Historic Places and now offers visitors three floors of interactive exhibits and galleries. The museum was designed by Roto Studio, a museum design and engineering firm specializing in creating interactive educational environments and experiences for children as well as adults.

== See also ==
- List of museums in Indiana
- List of children's museums in the United States
- National Register of Historic Places listings in Vanderburgh County, Indiana
