= Working Wonders Children's Museum =

Coordinates: 44.046489°N 121.315413°W

Working Wonders Children's Museum was a small children's museum in the downtown Old Mill District of Bend, Oregon, United States.

The tagline of the museum was Explore. Discover. Imagine. Create. Connect.

The museum closed on October 3, 2009, due to the poor economic conditions in Central Oregon which caused difficulty in fundraising efforts for the museum.
