= Sacramento Children's Museum =

Coordinates: 38.58877°N 121.28376°W

Sacramento Children's Museum (SCM) is a children's museum in Rancho Cordova near Sacramento, California. The Museum is designed for children ages birth to eight. The Museum includes hands-on activities for children using pressurized tubes, artificial currents, balls in chutes to explore gravity, as well as painting and craft art activities. The museum also offers a pint-sized city for children to role play, including a miniature grocery store. The Museum is located off U.S. Route 50 in California. and was organized as a non-profit corporation in 2005 under the guidance of Kathleen Palley (a local mother) and Alan Godlove. The facility opened August 25, 2011 under the guidance of Executive Director Sharon Stone Smith. The museum includes 7,000 square feet of space.
