= Imagine Children's Museum =

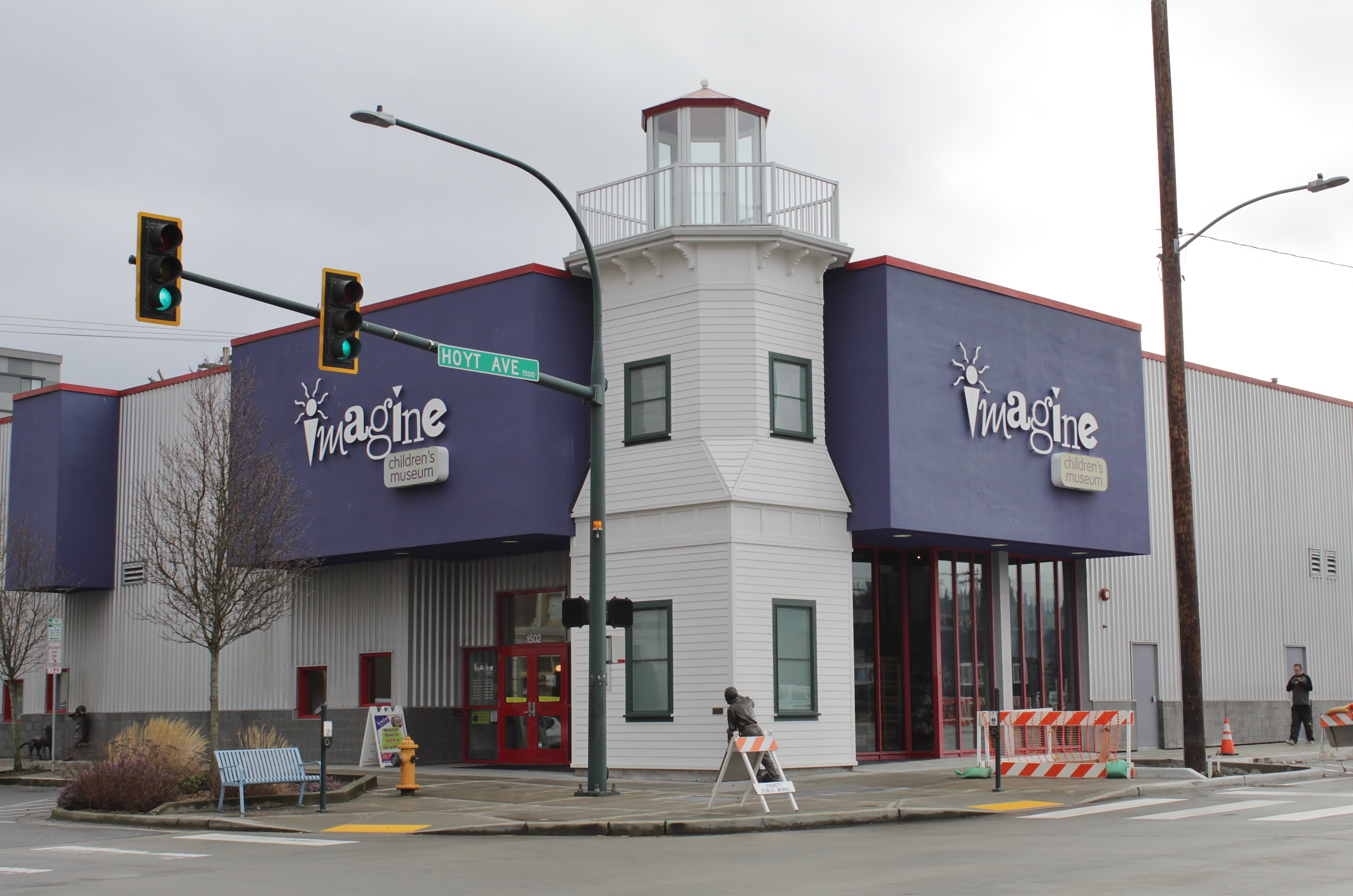
- Front entrance of the museum at Wall St. and Hoyt Ave. (2004-2022)
- Established: 1991
- Location: 1502 Wall Street; Everett, Washington
- Coordinates: 47°58′39″N 122°12′34″W
- Type: Children's museum
- Website: www.imaginecm.org

Imagine Children's Museum is a non-profit children's museum located in Everett, Washington, USA, near Seattle.

== History ==
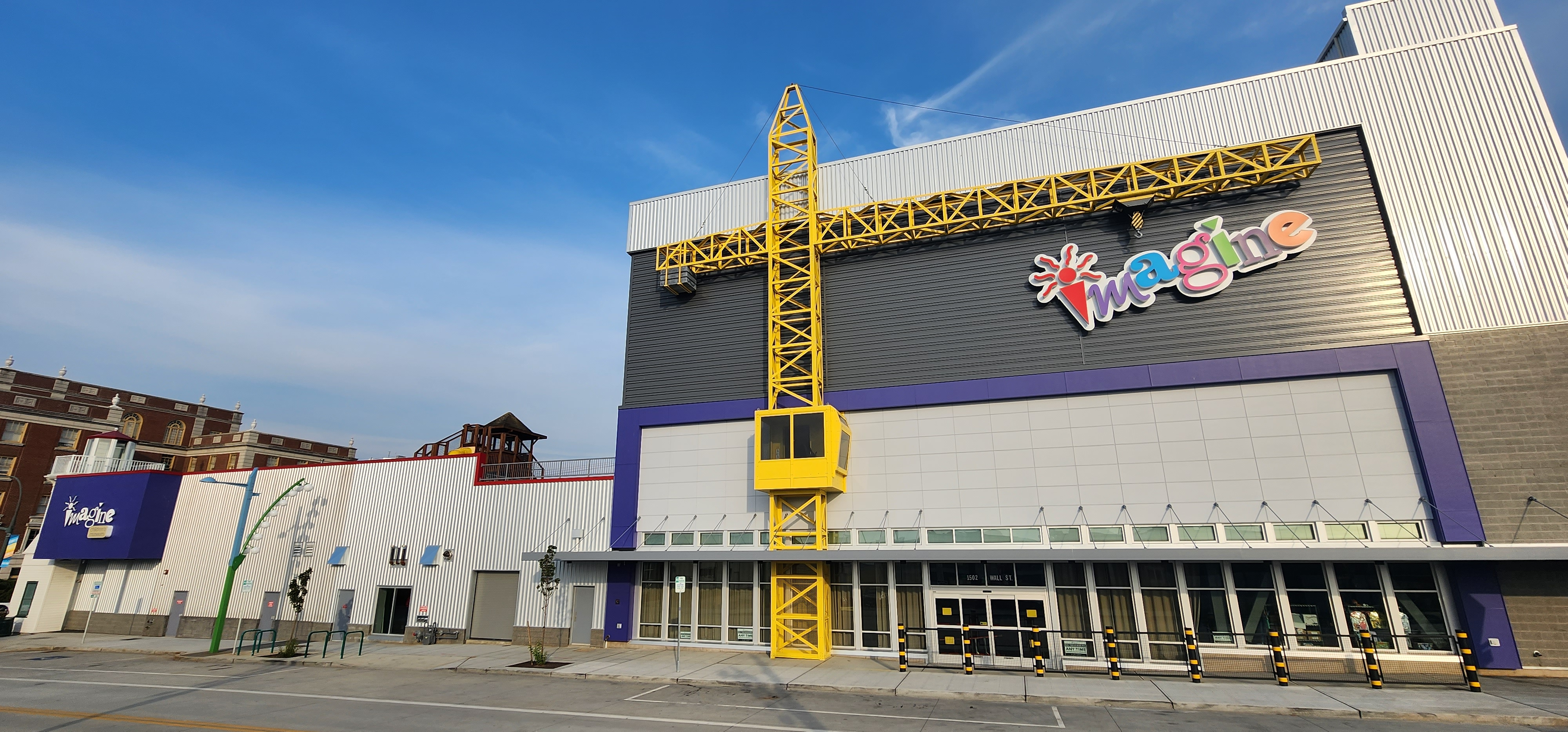
Front entrance of the museum on Hoyt Ave. (August 2023)

The museum was founded in 1991 as the Children's Museum of Snohomish County, as part of a countywide initiative to establish children-oriented places in Snohomish County by the county government's Children's Commission. It opened in 1993 at a storefront in nearby Marysville, but was forced to move to a temporary space in downtown Everett in 1995. The county government planned to locate the museum permanently at McCollum Park in Mill Creek, but plans fell through during the late 1990s, leading to a donation by the Schack family to fund a permanent museum in downtown Everett.

The new $4.75 million museum, a former Everett Mutual Bank branch with 20,000 square feet (1,900 m^{2}) of space, opened on October 17, 2004, and was renamed the Imagine Children's Museum. In its first year at the expanded location, the museum reported an attendance of 146,000, more than quadruple its annual attendance at its temporary locations. According to the museum's website, in 2019, the last full year before the pandemic, it served more than 248,000 people through the museum and outreach programming.

In 2020, the museum announced plans for a four-story expansion that would add 47,000 square feet (4,400 m^{2}) in the southern parking lot. Plans included a construction crane exhibit that would allow visitors inside the museum to step into the crane cab and pretend to be crane operators.

The $25 million expansion project ultimately added a three-story expansion of 33,000 square feet (3,066 m^{2}), doubling the museum's size. The LEED-certified building includes interactive, hands-on exhibit areas designed to promote children's active learning and healthy development through play. The expanded museum opened to members on August 19, 2022, and had a "soft opening" for the public on September 7, 2022. Its Grand Opening and Ribbon Cutting event took place on October 29, 2022.

== Exhibits and programs ==
Imagine Children's Museum offers playful learning areas children between the ages of 1 and 12 years. Some of the exhibits are reflective of life in Snohomish County, including a child-sized airplane cockpit, a bus donated by Everett Transit, and a theater stage. The museum's rooftop was converted into an outdoor playground in 2005, including a two-story wooden tower, climbing wall and other play areas. Exhibit areas in the new expansion include the Woodlands Adventure, where children can climb among the trees of a make-believe forest, Puget Sound Ecosystem Gallery, with a real gray whale skeleton and cold water aquarium, a Tinker Shop, where children learn to use real tools supervised by their caregivers, and Import, Export, Our Port, where children can pretend to be a tugboat captain in the Port of Everett.
