= Flint Children's Museum =

- Established: 1980
- Location: Flint, Michigan
- Coordinates: 43.01405°N 83.71173°W
- Type: Children's museum
- Website: www.flintchildrensmuseum.org

Association of Science-Technology Centers
- astc.org

Flint Children's Museum in Flint, Michigan was inspired by a visit to a Washington D.C. children's museum in 1979. Local educator Mary Newman began Flint Children's Museum.

Located on the campus of Kettering University at 1602 University Ave. (Formerly Third Ave.) in Flint.

== Background ==
In 1980, a hands-on antiques and crafts exhibit for children was installed at Flint's Sloan Museum. By 1986, the exhibit had grown so significantly that, with community support and additional grants, the Flint Children's Museum's first permanent location was established at NorthBank Center in downtown Flint, operating there for 7 years.

An anonymous gift in 1990 created the Mary Newman Endowment Fund at the Community Foundation of Greater Flint. That fund, named for the museum's founder and first Executive Director, has since grown to over 1 million dollars, and the proceeds from that fund continue to provide support for the museum.

The current facility was donated by an anonymous donor, designated to house the Children's Museum through a long-term lease. The Museum has been operating at this location since 1993.

== Exhibits & Programs ==
Educational hands-on exhibits for children:

- Mr. Bones - showing how our skeletons work
- The Discovery Zone - a rotating exhibit space where there is always something new
- Recycled Rhythms - where they can develop their musical skills on a variety of unconventional instruments
- Center Stage - where young performers can act out anything they imagine
- The Baby Oaisis - a safe space with activities for our visitors ages 0–12 months
- Sproutside - a natural, outdoor learning area which opens from May-Oct
- Our town - a mini town inside with an pizzaria, grocery store, post office and fire truck
- Draw-Alive - rotating themes with a screen to see your colors on your animal
- Rock wall - a mini rock wall with padding on the ground

=== Monthly Themed Activities ===
Events with a theme to go along with the month.
