= Madison Children's Museum =

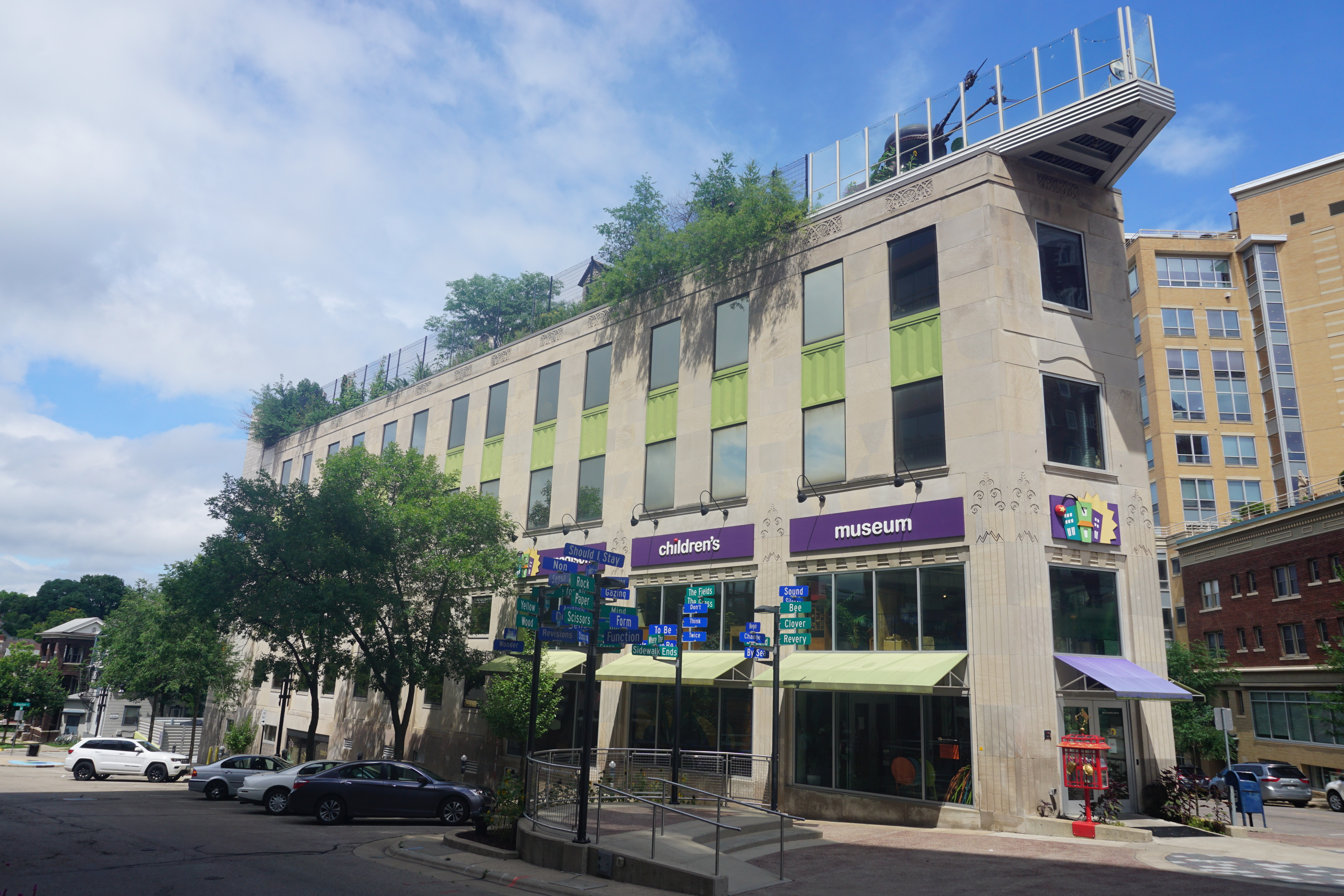
- Established: 1980
- Location: 100 N. Hamilton St, Madison, Wisconsin, United States
- Coordinates: 43.0769°N 89.3844°W
- Type: Children's Museum
- Visitors: over 150,000 visits annually
- Public transit access: Metro Transit, Any bus line which comes near the Capitol.
- Website: http://www.madisonchildrensmuseum.org

The Madison Children's Museum is a museum for children in Madison, Wisconsin, that contains exhibits on the arts, sciences, history, culture, health, and civic engagement.

== History ==
Madison Children's Museum was founded in 1980 by a group of early childhood specialists. The founding board of directors and volunteers built traveling exhibits that were displayed at neighborhood centers, parks and playgrounds. They also operated a pilot museum in the basement of the Wisconsin Academy of Sciences, Arts and Letters. The success of the pilot program prompted the museum to relocate to a warehouse at Bedford and West Washington in 1985.

After a successful capital campaign, Madison Children's Museum opened its doors in another rented location on 100 State Street in 1991. The museum once again outgrew its space. In 2005, MCM acquired a $5 million, five-story office building through the generosity of W. Jerome Frautschi. The museum undertook a $10 million capital campaign to renovate the building, create an accessible green roof, and install new exhibits. The new facility opened on August 14, 2010, and greatly expanded the museum's capacity.

In 2014, Madison Children's Museum earned LEED Gold certification for an existing building. The museum was honored for its green practices, like its use of recycled building materials and composting practice.

== Exhibits ==
The museum features many exhibits for kids of all ages, including a green rooftop.
