= WOW! Children's Museum =

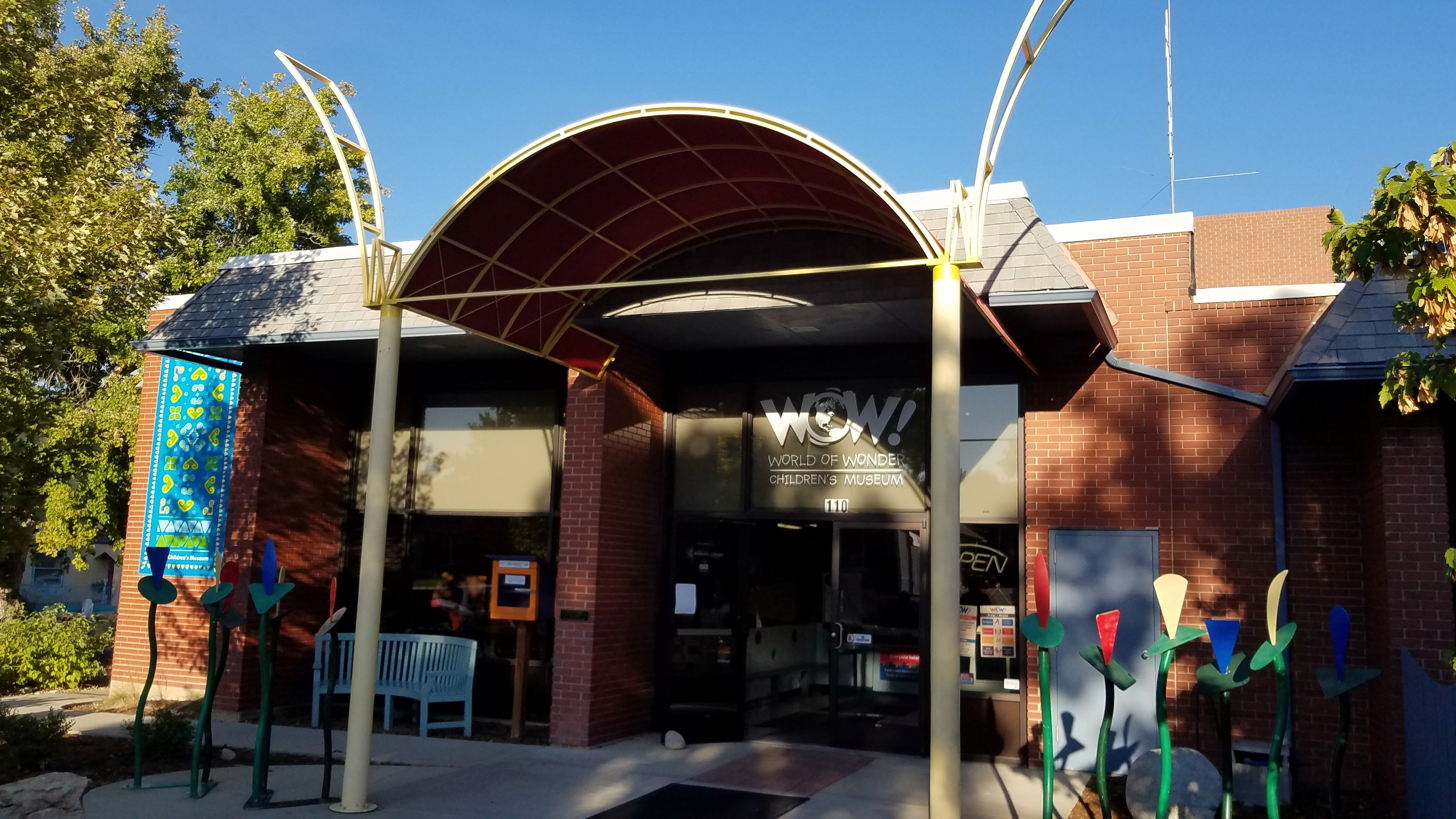
- Entrance to WOW! Children's Museum
- Established: 1996
- Location: 110 N. Harrison Ave; Lafayette, Colorado (United States)
- Coordinates: 39.999°N 105.089°W
- Type: Children's museum
- Website: wowchildrensmuseum.org

WOW! Children's Museum, formally World of Wonder, is an interactive children's museum located in Lafayette, Colorado geared toward children under 12. It was founded in 1996 by Lisa and Dario Attallah and in 2004 moved to Lafayette from Louisville. A 2019 expansion allowed for the addition of an outdoor programming space. The museum schedules designated Sensory friendly events for children with autism or sensory processing disorder, including a sensory room.

In 2015, it was named among the top 25 children's museums in the United States by the Early Childhood Education Zone, welcomed its millionth visitor, and was on track for its highest annual attendance.
