= Children's Museum in Easton =

Children's museum in Massachusetts, US

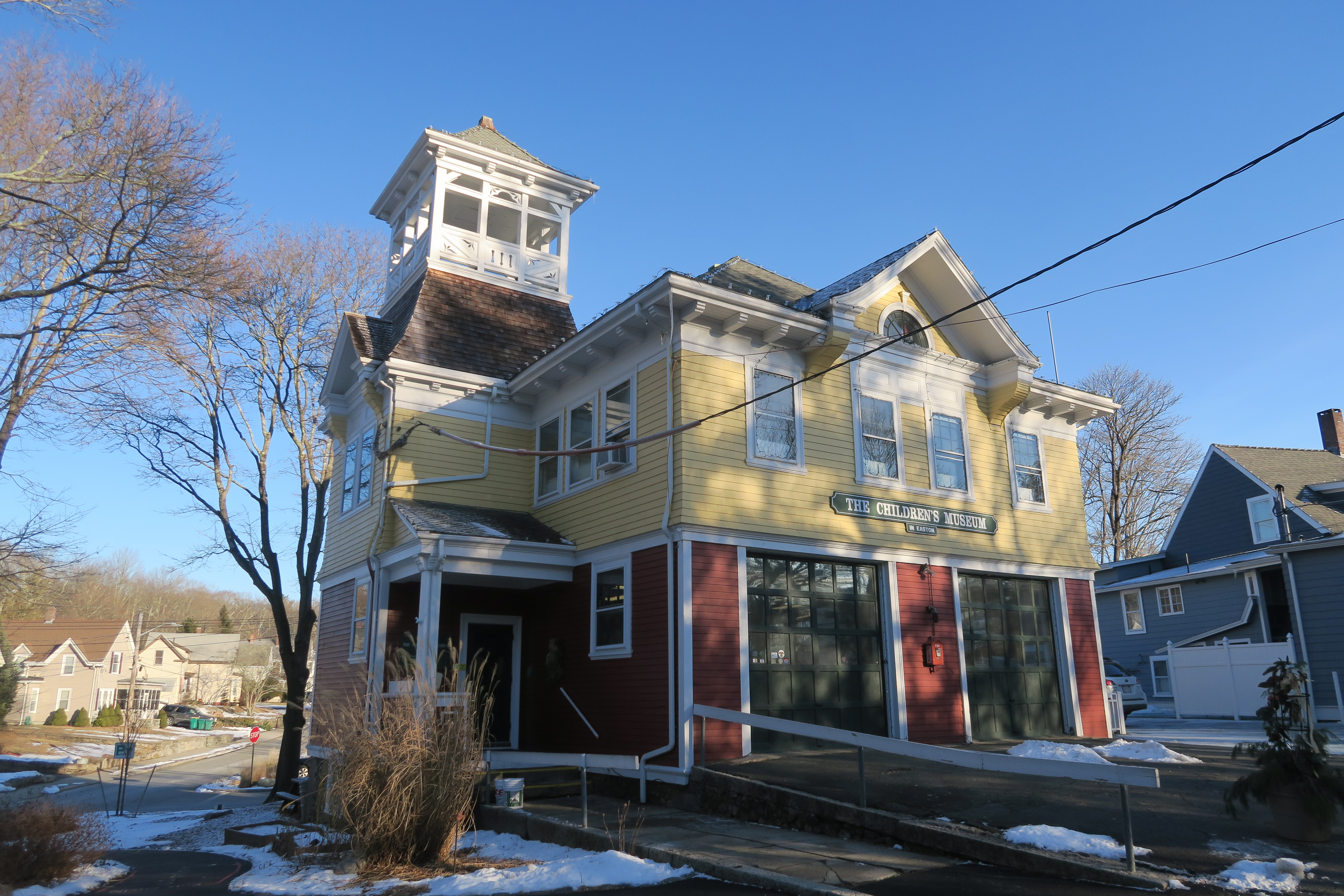
- Established: 1991
- Location: 9 Sullivan Avenue Easton, Massachusetts 02357
- Coordinates: 42°4′0.7″N 71°6′8.9″W
- Type: Children's museum
- Website: http://www.childrensmuseumineaston.org/

The Children's Museum in Easton is a children's museum in Easton, Massachusetts, dedicated to educational, cultural, and social learning for children and families with a primary focus on children ages 1–5. It is located at 9 Sullivan Avenue in North Easton inside of a historic firehouse. The museum is three floors of different activities designed for interactive learning. It is also located close to Stonehill College.

== History ==
The Children's Museum was started in 1986 by four Easton women, all mothers of young children in search of hands-on educational experiences for their children. The location at that time was a historic firehouse built in 1904. By 1986, it had not been a functioning fire station in decades, and the town of Easton had decided to sell it. The mothers proposed the museum to the town, and the vote went to selectmen. The vote passed, with the museum promising to donate $100,000 of its admission profits back to the town. The mothers had no corporate sponsors, so it took five years of fundraising activities through the community until the museum received enough support to open in 1991.
