= Science and Discovery Center of Northwest Florida =

Children's museum in Panama City, Florida

Coordinates: 30.17988°N 85.6641°W

The Science and Discovery Center of Northwest Florida is a children's museum in Panama City, Florida. The exhibits include interactive science and natural history displays, play areas for young children, live reptiles and a nature trail. The center also features an on-site preschool.

== History ==
The idea for the museum began in 1967 as a children's museum, with leadership by the Junior Women's Club and the Women's Club of Panama City. Temporary displays began in 1969.

The Junior Museum of Bay County opened in 1981. The current building opened in 2010, and the museum's name was changed to the Science and Discovery Center of Northwest Florida in 2011.
