= Wonder Works =

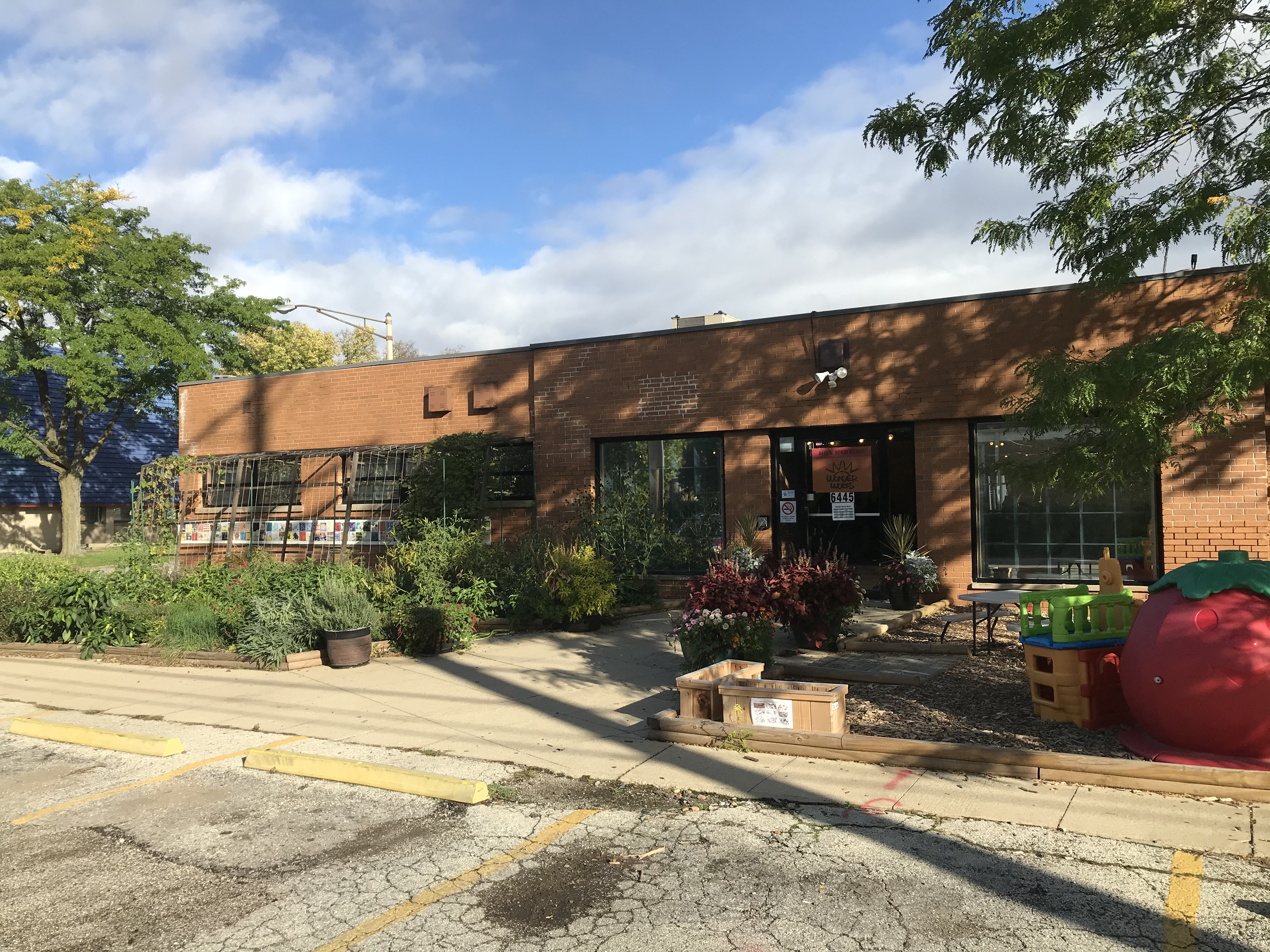
- Established: 1993
- Location: 6445 West North Avenue; Oak Park, IL 60302
- Coordinates: 41°54′32″N 87°47′14″W
- Type: Children's museum
- Visitors: 55,000 (2008)
- Director: Rachel Rettberg
- Website: http://www.wonder-works.org

Wonder Works is a children's museum, a non-profit corporation established in 2002, located in the village of Oak Park, Illinois. It is the successor to the Children's Museum of Oak Park, established in 1993. The museum is dedicated to the principle of offering a fun, largely self-directed playing and learning place for children.

Occupying its own building in one of the village's business districts, the museum attracted seventy thousand visitors in 2017. They enjoyed the facilities as drop-in visitors, as museum members, as birthday party invitees, or as special-event attendees.

The museum funds its operations by means of the sale of visitor day passes, yearly memberships, proceeds from special events, and fundraising. Special events generally include value-added educational programs for adults and kids, with most special events being included with general admission.

Wonder Works is managed by a board of directors comprising members of the local community; a CEO; DOO, museum floor managers; an education team, and a number of full-, part-time, or volunteer associates in various roles.

The museum hosts an annual event called "Off the Wall", in which local teens created a mural under the direction of local artist Carolyn Elaine.
