= Museum of Childhood =

There are several museums called the Museum of Childhood:

- Museum of Childhood (Edinburgh), Scotland
- V&A Museum of Childhood, now renamed Young V&A, Bethnal Green, London, England, run by the Victoria and Albert Museum
- Highland Museum of Childhood, Strathpeffer, Scotland
- Sudbury Hall National Trust Museum of Childhood, Derbyshire, England

== See also ==
- Children's museum
