= Lutz Children's Museum =

Coordinates: 41.7555°N 72.5199°W

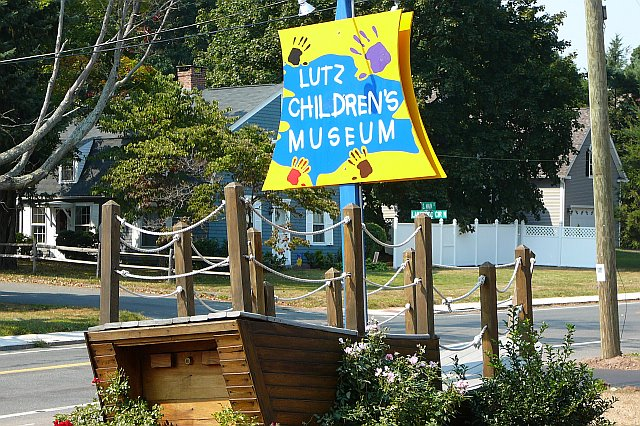
- Established: 1953
- Location: Manchester, Connecticut, United States
- Type: Children's museum
- Director: Clare J Mazur
- Website: LutzMuseum.org

The Lutz Children's Museum is a non-profit children's museum located in Manchester, Connecticut, United States. Originally known as the Lutz Junior Museum, it was developed on March 4, 1953 by a vote of the Manchester Parent Teacher Association (PTA) Council. Their objective was to "provide supplemental enrichment to students in their classrooms and ask the community to come forth with ideas."

== History ==
Hazel P. Lutz, then current Chairperson of the Art Department in Manchester, approached the Manchester Parent Teacher Association (PTA) with the suggestion to establish a community children's museum. During her travels, she had collected a variety of artifacts and trinkets that she believed would be of interest to children. Hoping to use these items as educational tools, she established a “museum” in the storage closet of her schoolroom. Her collection grew through the donations and began to include items that could be related to most academic disciplines. From her storage closet, the PTA offered the museum its first official home in the basement of the Waddell School. By 1957 the rapidly expanding museum possessed hundreds of kits and had a volunteer league of one hundred people. The museum was established as a private non-profit organization in 1958. The Board of Education also offered the museum a new home in June of that same year, and the museum was moved to 126 Cedar Street, adjacent to Washington School. On September 26, 1958 the museum opened its new doors to the public. The museum now had a home that would allow the display of its collection, the exhibit of live animals, and a space to hold year-round classes for children.

The museum continued to grow and by 1982, the museum had outgrown its home on Cedar Street and the Town of Manchester had proposed a larger building. The former South School building, situated beside the Charter Oak Reservoir with scenic views of the Manchester Country Club, was proposed as a new location. The museum accepted the larger building and adopted a new name at the same time. The Lutz Junior Museum became the “Lutz Children’s Museum."

== Mission ==
The mission of the Lutz Children's Museum is to provide a multi-faceted museum for children to explore culture, history, and the natural sciences through internal and external exhibits, programs, and experiences.

== Education and events ==
The museum offers classes in art, history, and natural sciences taught by its resident teachers.

In addition, the Lutz also offers an In-School Resource Lessons, during which the museum's educators travel to schools, camps, and other children's programs to deliver lessons similar to the ones that are held at the museum. "They travel with museum artifacts or live animals and sometimes appear in costume." The Lutz Children's museum educators "typically have undergraduate degrees in their area of expertise, archaeology or biology for example, plus advanced degrees in education and/or teaching certification."

The museum also hosts a number of events each year, including the annual Farm Day held at the Fish Family Farm in Bolton. Art exhibits are held during the school year, where Manchester's eight elementary schools select student artwork to be displayed. The artwork is sent to the museum, where the students are able to view their work on display.

== Exhibits ==
=== Main Street 1943 ===
The Lutz opened up the Main Street 1943 exhibit in the autumn of 2010. Main Street 1943 is an exhibit and play area designed to replicate Main Street in Manchester in the year 1943. There are hometown staples such as Marlow's department store (now closed), the typical Main Street apartment, and nods to World War II such as an old-fashioned radio, newspapers, and other artifacts. This exhibit explores the history and culture of Manchester, as well as the nation and the world during this time period.

=== Farm Room ===
One of Lutz Museum's most popular exhibits is the farm room, which houses a farm-related play exhibit, information and displays pertaining to working and living on a farm, and a statue of a cow that can actually be milked.

=== Animal Room ===
One of the staples of the museum is the Animal Room, which is home to snakes, chinchillas, turtles, rabbits, various birds, and, most famously, Chuckles the woodchuck, who presides over the museum's annual Groundhog Day celebration.

== Oak Grove Nature Center ==
In conjunction with the Town of Manchester, the museum operates the Oak Grove Nature Center at 269 Oak Grove Street. Located on the fifty-two-acre nature preserve, the museum uses the building for outdoor education programs. The nature center is open for specific programs and events.
