= Children's Museum of Tacoma =

Museum in Tacoma, Washington, US

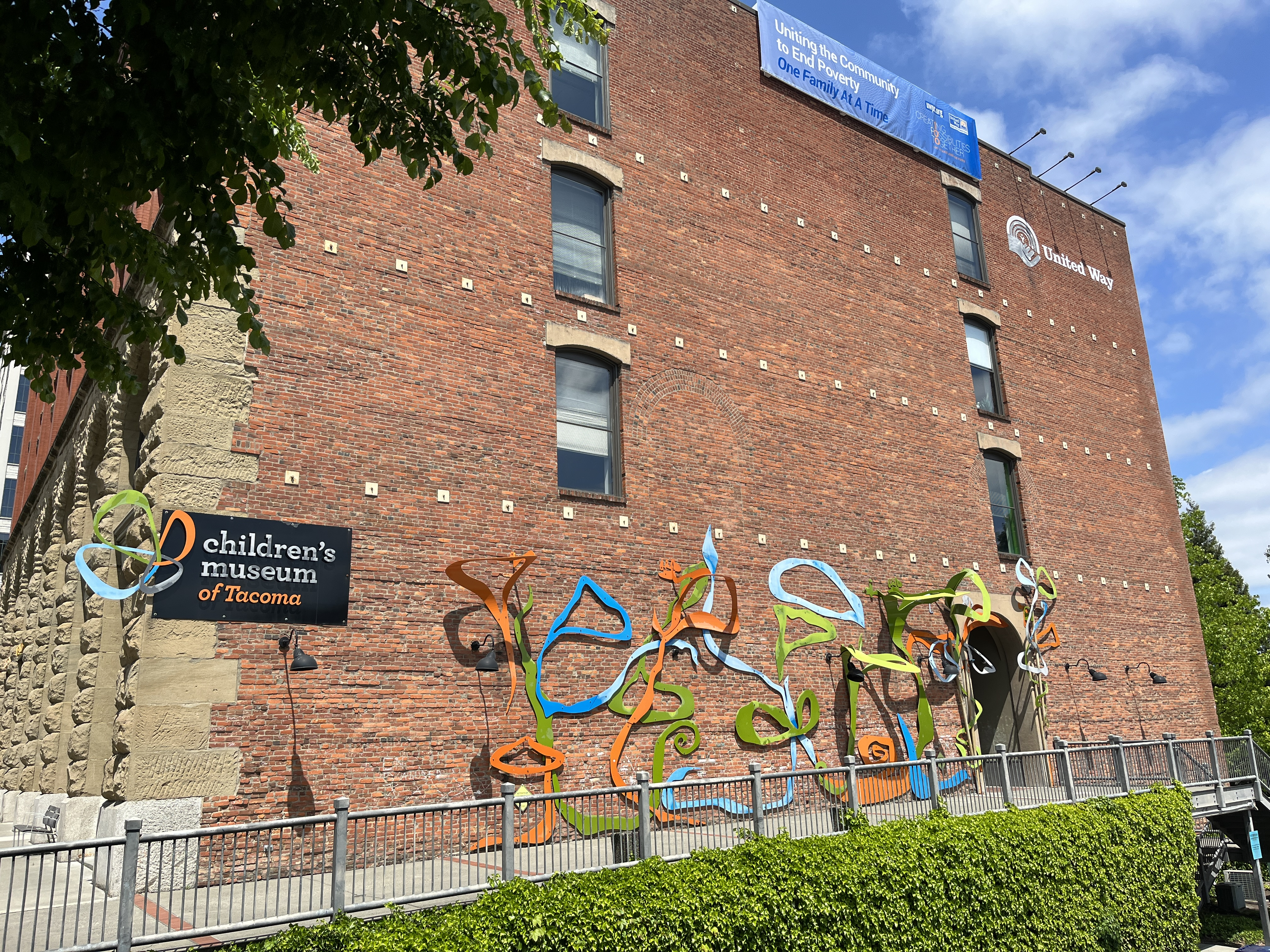
- The museum's exterior, 2023
- Established: 1985
- Location: 1501 Pacific Avenue, Tacoma, WA 98402.
- Coordinates: 47.2491°N 122.4373°W
- Type: Nonprofit Children's museum
- Director: Tanya Durand (2000-present)
- Website: www.playtacoma.org

Children's Museum of Tacoma is a nonprofit museum for children located in Tacoma, Washington. The museum officially opened in 1986. The museum offers hands on play-to-learn experiences for children. In 2018 the museum secured a 1.6 million dollar commitment from the U.S. Department of Defense to open a satellite location on a military base (Joint Base Lewis-McChord).

== History ==
The museum was established in 1985, and opened in 1986: it features play activities and hands on learning for children. In 2000 Tanya Durand became the Executive director.

In 2012 the museum moved to a larger venue in Tacoma Washington. The museum also began a policy of allowing customers to pay whatever they want to pay for admission. The museum has three separate themes: Woods, Water and Voyager.

=== The University of Washington Tacoma ===
In 2015 The University of Washington Tacoma and the Children's Museum of Tacoma opened a learning center called The Muse. The Muse was set up to serve the children of instructors and staff of the university.

=== Partnership with the U.S. Department of Defense ===
In 2018 the Children's Museum made plans with the support of the U.S. Department of Defense to open a second museum on the Joint Base Lewis-McChord. The museum is converting a skating rink on the base. The museum is expected to open in 2020. The Department of Defense committed $1.6 million to the project.

In January 2020 it was announced that Boeing and the Employees Community Fund (ECF) of Boeing have donated $1.5-million to the new Children's Museum of Tacoma which will be on the Joint Base Lewis-McChord.
