= Explore More Discovery Museum =

- Established: 2002
- Location: Harrisonburg, Virginia
- Coordinates: 38.447791°N 78.868629°W
- Type: Children's museum
- Curator: Lisa Shull
- Website: http://www.iexploremore.com

Explore More Discovery Museum, formerly known as the Harrisonburg Children's Museum is a non-profit museum focusing on interactive, multi-sensory learning experiences for children, located in Harrisonburg, Virginia. Themed learning areas include a kitchen and farmer's market, construction zone, medical center, television studio, science lab, theater, farm, garage and art center.

== History ==
In 2002, it was a mobile museum without permanent display space. In 2003, it moved into 30 N. Main Street and acquired a full-time executive director with additional part-time staff.

On September 4, 2010, the old museum closed in order to relocate to a new facility in the renovated A&N Department Store building at 150 S. Main St. which had been vacant. Construction for renovation of the first two floor (exclusive of exhibits) cost $415,464.

The new museum was opened in November 2010.
