= Hands On Children's Museum =

Hands on Children's Museum
- Inspired Learning for All
- Established: 1987
- Location: Olympia, Washington, USA
- Type: Children's Museum
- Visitors: 150,000
- CEO: Patty Belmonte
- Website: www.hocm.org

Hands On Children's Museum is a children's museum in Olympia, Washington, United States. Founded in 1987, the museum is located on Olympia's East Bay waterfront at 414 Jefferson Street NE. It is a nonprofit organization whose mission is to stimulate curiosity, creativity, and critical thinking through interactive exhibits and learning experiences for children, families, and the community. The museum serves children and families throughout the South Sound region and describes itself as the most visited children's museum in the Pacific Northwest, with approximately 300,000 visitors annually.

The museum's current facility opened in November 2012. The approximately 28,000-square-foot, three-story building contains indoor exhibit space as well as a half-acre Outdoor Discovery Center. The building is LEED Gold certified and received three Green Globes certification for sustainable building practices.

== Exhibits and galleries ==
Hands On Children's Museum has approximately 150 interactive exhibits in indoor galleries and additional exhibits in its Outdoor Discovery Center. The exhibits emphasize science, technology, engineering, art and mathematics (STEAM), nature, health, creative expression and imaginative play.

Major galleries and exhibit areas include:

- Good For You: An agricultural and healthy-living area where children can explore food, farming, a farmers market and pretend-play environments.
- Our Puget Sound: An exploration of the marine environment and regional waterways featuring boats, water play, and activities based on life and work around the Puget Sound. Includes a two-story climbing structure connecting the museum's levels.
- Emergency: A role-playing area where children can explore emergency services and healthcare-related occupations.
- Our Fabulous Forest: A Pacific Northwest forest-themed environment featuring imaginative play and nature-based activities.
- Move It: An area focused on physical activity, movement and motor skills.
- Build It: A construction and engineering area where children can experiment with building materials and tools.
- Snug Harbor: A space designed particularly for young children, including children age four and younger.
- Arts & Parts Studio: An art-making space using conventional and recycled materials.

The museum's exhibits are periodically supplemented by temporary and traveling exhibits and seasonal activities.

=== Outdoor Discovery Center ===
The half-acre Outdoor Discovery Center extends the museum's hands-on learning environment outdoors. It includes a replica Puget Sound beach, children's garden, trike and hike loop, lighthouse lookout, climbing areas and a vintage 56-foot schooner, the Megan D. The schooner provides opportunities for children to climb aboard, explore a crow's nest and learn through maritime-themed play.

The Outdoor Discovery Center was selected as one of three national pilot sites for the Association of Children's Museums' "Going Wild!" initiative, which examined ways children's museums could connect children with nature.

== Education & Programs ==
The museum provides educational programming in addition to open-ended exhibit play. Programs include preschool, camps, workshops, field trips, community outreach, parenting education and family support programs.

=== Preschool ===
Hands On Children's Museum operates a preschool program based at the museum. The program emphasizes early learning through play and incorporates the museum's hands-on approach to science, art, nature and healthy living. The museum's preschool and early-learning programming is part of its broader effort to provide early STEAM learning opportunities.

=== Camps ===
Hands On Children's Museum offers seasonal educational camps, including summer camps for school-age children. Camp sessions are organized by age and typically combine museum exploration with guided projects and activities.

=== Field Trips & Community Education ===
The museum offers educational field trips and outreach programs for schools and community organizations. Its education programs are designed to supplement classroom learning with hands-on experiences in science, art, engineering, nature and other subjects.

== Access & Inclusion Programs ==
The museum operates an access program intended to reduce financial barriers to participation. The organization states that more than one-third of its annual visitation is served through free or reduced-fee admission and membership programs.

Hands On Children's Museum is recognized as a national "Museum for All." Its access efforts include discounted admission programs, community partnerships and programs serving families who might otherwise face barriers to museum participation.

The museum has also received recognition from the Noyce Foundation as a Bright Lights Museum for its work bringing art and science education to underserved populations.

The museum offers sensory-friendly programming and other accommodations intended to make museum experiences more accessible to children and families with differing needs.

== Annual & Seasonal Events ==
Hands On Children's Museum presents a calendar of recurring seasonal events in addition to its regular exhibits and educational programs. Major events have included:

- Summer Splash!: A summer festival featuring themed activities, special guests, animal encounters, science demonstrations, art activities and other hands-on programming.
- Boo Bash: An annual Halloween-season celebration featuring Halloween-themed science, art and play activities without a focus on frightening or scary experiences. Activities have included science demonstrations and themed crafts.
- Noon Year's Eve: A family-oriented New Year's Eve celebration held during the daytime, including a countdown designed for children and families.
- Arctic Adventures: a winter-themed event featuring seasonal science, art and physical activities. Recent programming has included sock skating, winter science demonstrations, an indoor blacklight attraction and penguin-themed activities.
- First Friday Night: A monthly reduced-admission evening held on the first Friday of the month from 4 to 8 p.m., providing families with an additional lower-cost opportunity to visit the museum.

== Birthday parties and private events ==
Hands On Children's Museum offers birthday parties for children and provides designated event space for private celebrations. Birthday experiences can combine access to the museum's exhibits with reserved party space and organized activities. The museum also makes its indoor and outdoor facilities available for other private events, including family gatherings, receptions, fundraisers and organizational events.

The museum's waterfront location and combination of indoor galleries and outdoor play areas have also made it a venue for larger community and private events.

== Expansion ==
In 2025, the City of Olympia and Hands On Children's Museum moved forward with plans for a major expansion of the museum's East Bay campus. The project will expand exhibit, early-learning and community-programming capacity. Plans include new indoor and outdoor exhibit areas, a new arrival plaza, culinary classroom, flexible event space with a traveling-exhibit gallery, additional preschool and daycare space, and new parking spaces.

== Recognition and awards ==
Hands On Children's Museum has received recognition from local, regional and national organizations. Earlier honors included Best Museum and Best Family Entertainment awards in the Best of South Sound program and recognition by KING 5's Evening Magazine's Best of Western Washington.

More recent recognition has included repeated Best of South Sound awards in categories including museum, family entertainment, children's party venue and summer camp. The museum has also been recognized as a "Best Place for Kids" for more than a decade, according to the organization.

In 2026, South Sound Magazine recognized Hands On Children's Museum as Best Kids' Play Area.

== Play Day Café ==
The Play Day Café is the museum's on-site café, offering snacks, drinks, and kid-friendly food for families during their visit. Located within the museum, it gives visitors a convenient place to take a break and refuel between exploring the galleries and outdoor exhibits.

== See also ==
Children's museum

Olympia, Washington

List of children's museums in the United States
