= Raven Hill Discovery Center =

- Location within Michigan
- Established: 1991
- Location: 4737 Fuller Rd. East Jordan, Michigan
- Coordinates: 45.133375°N 85.05538°W
- Type: Children's museum, Science center
- Director: Cheri Leach
- Website: miravenhill.org

Raven Hill Discovery Center is a collection of indoor and outdoor exhibits for hands-on learning by children and adults in Michigan, United States. Established in 1991 they are primarily a Science Center but have a combined focus with history and art as well as nature and biology.

== History ==
Established as a non-profit organization in 1991 by Cheri and Tim Leach. They have continued to expand their outdoor exhibits and in the Fall of 2011 they expanded their indoor capacity.

== Purpose ==
Raven Hill Discovery Center is a regional science and technology center, as well as a cultural, historical and art center.
