= Connecticut Children's Museum =

Coordinates: 41.3084°N 72.9216°W

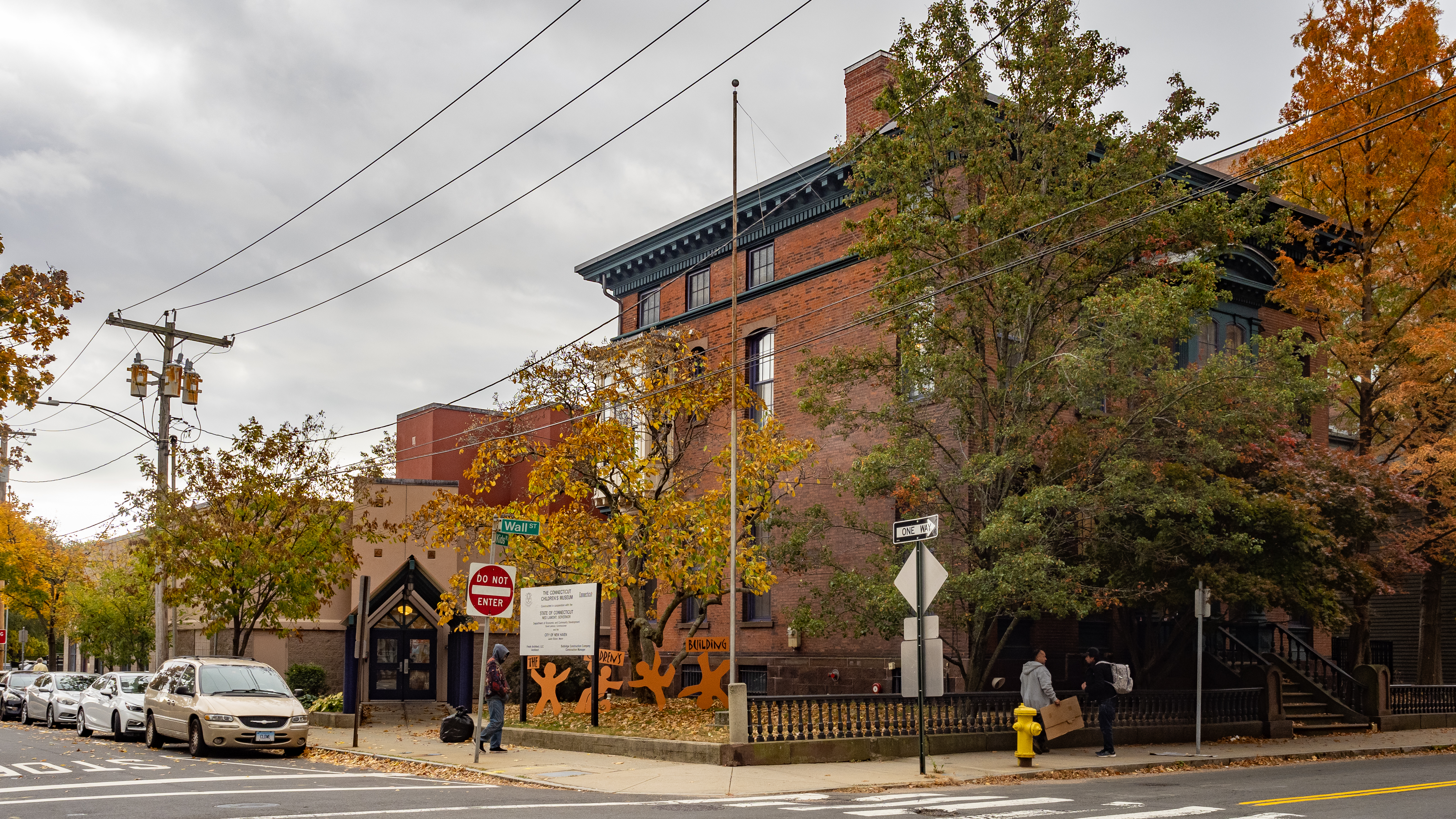
- Established: 2001
- Location: 22 Wall Street, New Haven, Connecticut
- Type: Children's museum
- Public transit access: 224
- Website: childrensbuilding.org

The Connecticut Children's Museum is located in the Children's Building in New Haven, Connecticut, which houses three programs interwoven in purpose and philosophy: Creating Kids Child Care Center, Creating Curriculum Child Care Provider Training Program, and the Connecticut Children's Museum itself. These programs are inspired by the theory of Multiple Intelligences which concludes that children learn in different ways.

== Philosophy ==
The Children's Museum is based on the idea that children need a place where they can escape the world around them to experience the magic and wisdom of learning at their own pace by interacting with the exhibits. The exhibits are intended to foster creativity and use of the imagination. The museum provides educators, working in a myriad of programs throughout the city, with a place to bring their children to help inspire creative minds. Through its colorful exhibits, children can interact with others in the community, where they can play and learn together.
