= Children's Museum of Southeastern Connecticut =

Coordinates: 41.3224°N 72.1986°W

Niantic Children's Museum
- Former name: Children's Museum of Southeastern Connecticut
- Established: 1992
- Location: 409 Main Street; Niantic, Connecticut
- Type: Children's museum

The Niantic Children's Museum, formerly the Children's Museum of Southeastern Connecticut, is an interactive educational and cultural institution located in Niantic, Connecticut. Founded in 1992, the museum covers 5,000 square feet (460 m^{2}) and is designed to encourage children to study arts, sciences, health, and various cultures.

The museum features three major areas: The Discovery Room features a variety of science-based activities and the museum's resident animals. The Imagination Room features encourages learning through play with a fire engine, fishing boat, global market, toy garden and toddler area. The Outdoor Playspace features a retro treehouse, music garden, dig pit, playhouse and kid-sized zipline.
