= J. W. Wood Building =

Historic commercial building in Virginia, United States

- U.S. National Register of Historic Places
- Virginia Landmarks Register
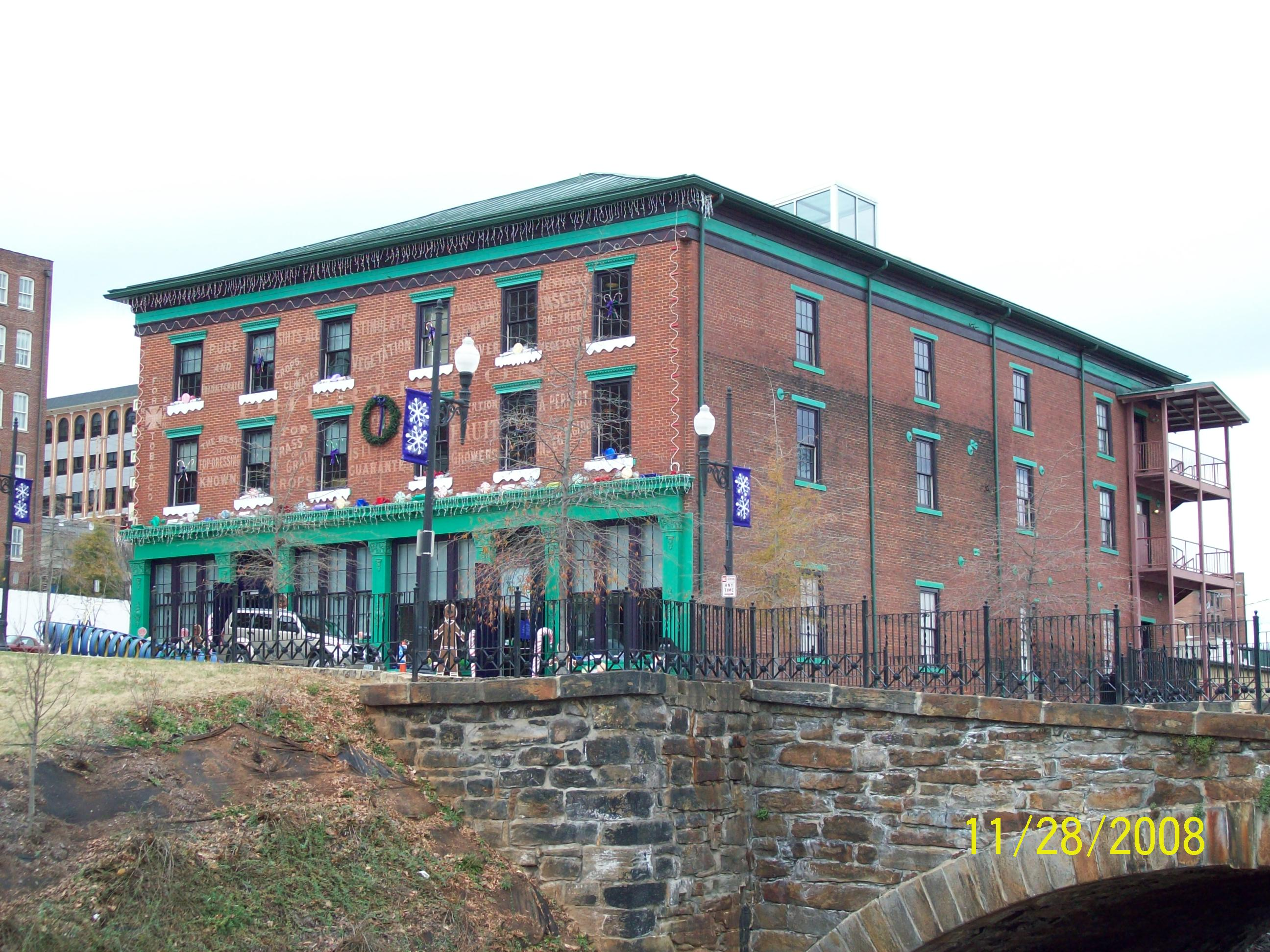
- J.W. Wood Building, Lynchburg VA, November 2008

- Location within Virginia Location within the United States
- Location: 23-27 Ninth St., Lynchburg, Virginia
- Coordinates: 37°24′58″N 79°8′26″W
- Area: 0.3 acres (0.12 ha)
- Built: 1850
- Architectural style: Greek Revival
- NRHP reference No.: 83003292
- VLR No.: 118-0009

Significant dates
- Added to NRHP: February 17, 1983
- Designated VLR: May 18, 1982

The J. W. Wood Building is a historic commercial building located at Lynchburg, Virginia. The 29,000-square-foot (2,700 m^{2}) commercial building in a modified Greek Revival-style. It was built between 1851 and 1853 as a warehouse. It is the largest and best preserved of the few pre-Civil War commercial structures remaining in Lynchburg.

It was listed on the National Register of Historic Places in 1983.
