= The Children's Museum, Connecticut =

Coordinates: 41.7619°N 72.7379°W

- Established: 1927
- Location: 180 Mohegan Drive; West Hartford, Connecticut, USA
- Type: Children's museum, Science and Nature museum
- Website: thechildrensmuseumct.org

The Children's Museum is the oldest museum for children in Connecticut, United States. The Museum is geared towards young children, ages 2–8. It is the fourth oldest children's museum in the US, serves over 200,000 people each year.

The museum was founded in 1927 as the Children's Museum of Hartford. That same year, Joseph S. Miller, a local businessman and amateur naturalist, donated his collection of 50,000 insects to the museum. It was known until 2006 as The Science Center of Connecticut. Formerly located at 950 Trout Brook Dr. in West Hartford, museum operations temporarily moved to 180 Mohegan Drive in West Hartford in 2022. The Children's Museum offers interactive exhibits, over a hundred live animals, and science and nature classes for children. It also includes The Children's Museum Preschool, one of the nation's oldest preschools, and of very few that feature a science and nature curriculum. The former museum featured New England's second largest planetarium, which closed in 2022, and a life-sized replica of a sperm whale (Connecticut's State animal) that visitors were able to walk inside. Conny the Whale was demolished in 2023, but her tail was cut off and installed across Trout Brook Drive in West Hartford.
