= Ann Arbor Hands-On Museum =

Children's science museum in Michigan

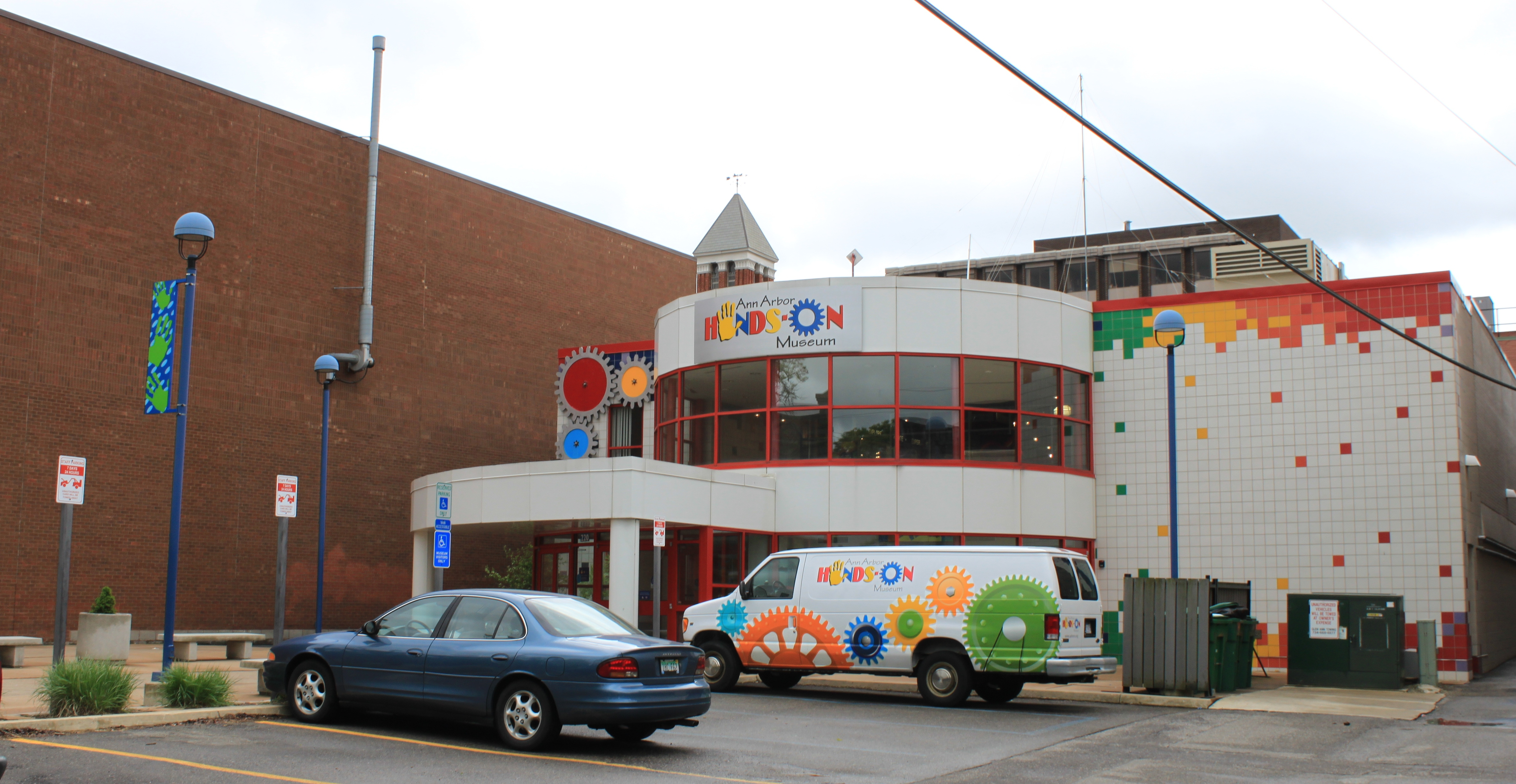
- Ann Street Entrance
- Established: 1978
- Location: 220 E. Ann Street, Ann Arbor, Michigan
- Coordinates: 42.2815°N 83.7466°W
- Website: aahom.org discoverscienceandnature.org
- Ann Arbor Central Fire Station
- U.S. National Register of Historic Places
- Michigan State Historic Site
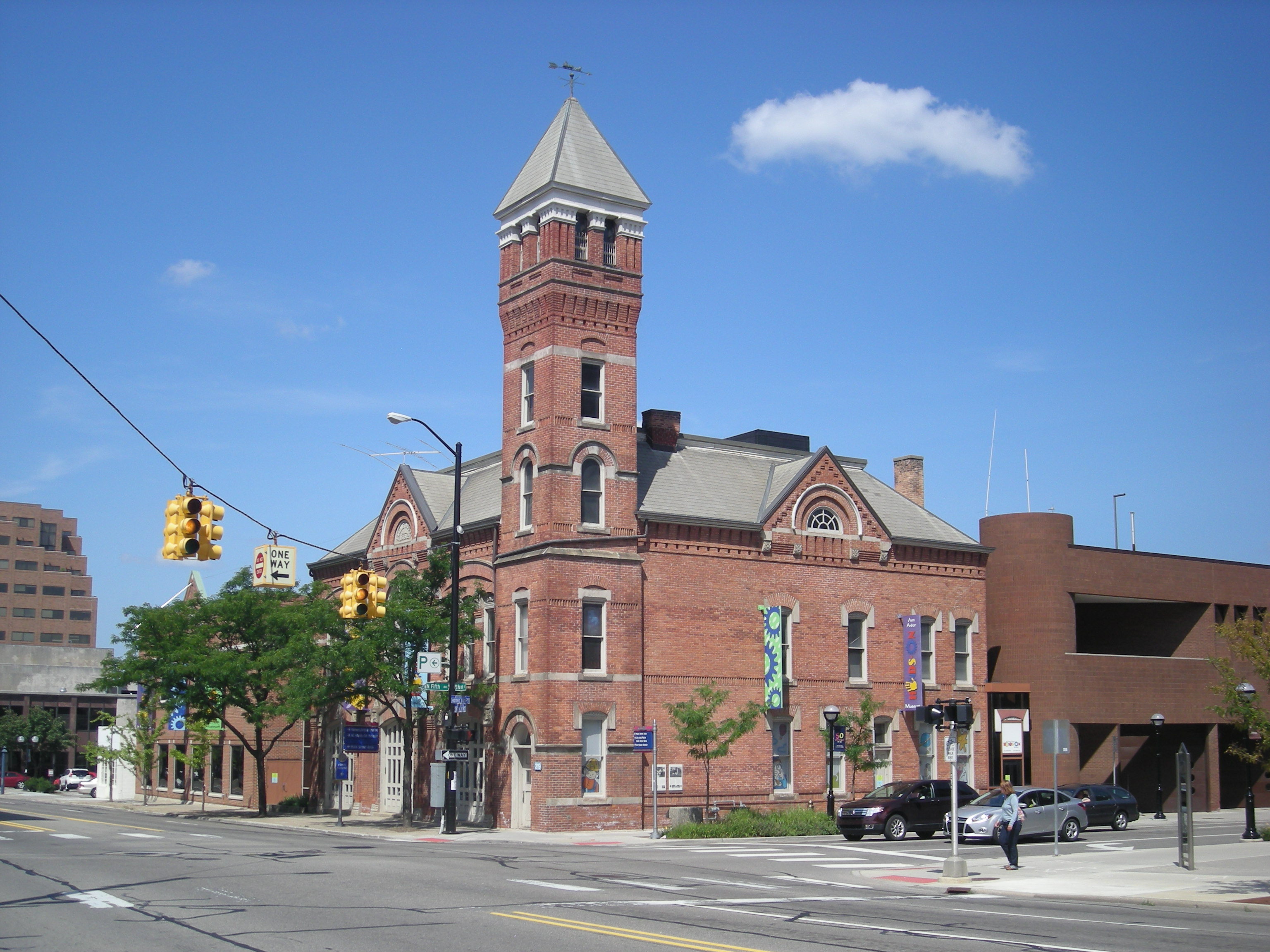
- Seen from 5th Avenue
- Location: Corner of 5th Avenue and Huron Street
- Built: 1882
- Architectural style: Italianate
- NRHP reference No.: 72000658
- Added to NRHP: January 13, 1972

The Ann Arbor Hands-On Museum, located in Ann Arbor, Michigan, United States, specializes in interactive exhibits with the goal of helping both children and adults discover the scientist within them by promoting science literacy through experimentation, exploration, and education.

The museum is located in the historic Ann Arbor Central Fire Station, which was the main station of the Ann Arbor Fire Department from 1882 to 1978. The fire department constructed a new central station on the same block, and the Hands-On Museum constructed a large addition to the historic firehouse that serves as the majority of the museum's exhibit space.

== History ==
The Hands-On Museum is located in downtown Ann Arbor, on the block bounded by East Huron Street, North Fourth Avenue, East Ann Street, and North Fifth Avenue. The historic firehouse is located on the southeast corner of the parcel, at the corner of Huron Street and Fifth Avenue.

=== Historic firehouse ===
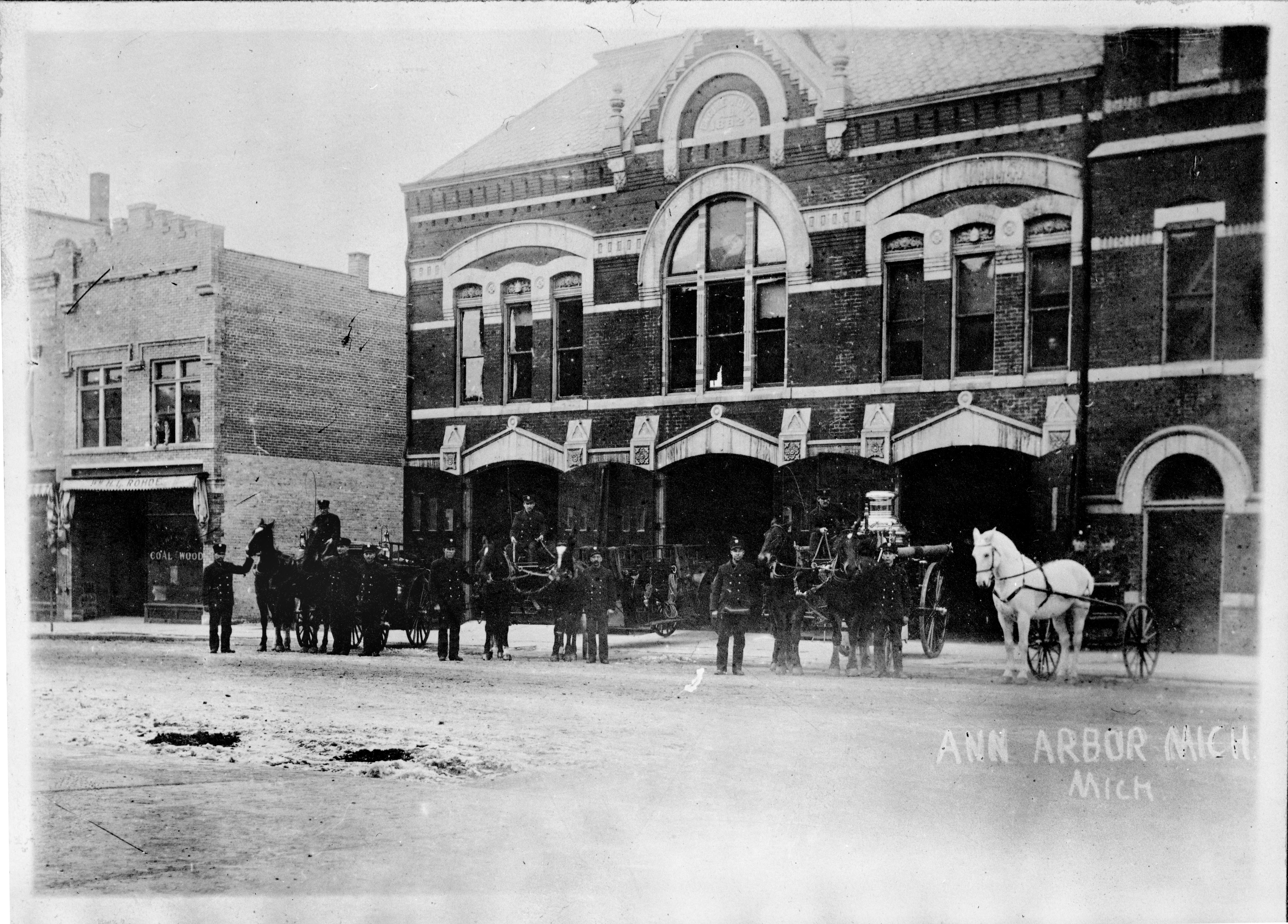
Firefighters and horses pose in front of the firehouse, early 20th century

The firefighting history of the city of Ann Arbor began in 1836, when the village council organized two volunteer firefighting companies. Large fires in 1845 and 1865 prompted the construction of cisterns around the city for firefighting, and the town voted to pay firefighters $5 per year for their service ($98 in 2024) beginning in 1868.

The city commissioned plans for a new firehouse in May 1882, to replace a small wooden structure on the same site. The city aldermen allotted $10,000 (equivalent to $279,000 in 2024) for the construction of the new firehouse, a sum that was criticized in the local press as extravagant given the city's current population of fewer than 10,000 people. Construction on the new Italianate firehouse began that summer, and was finished by June of 1883.

In addition to the construction of the new firehouse, the Ann Arbor fire department underwent multiple other large changes in the 1880s. The same year as the firehouse plans were approved, the city purchased the first horses for the fire department, replacing horses provided by nearby draymen as needed. The first fire hydrants were installed on the new city water system in 1885, and the first professional firefighters were hired in 1888.

The city switched from horses to motorized fire engines in 1915. As the size of fire engines grew, housing them in the 1882 firehouse became more difficult. By the 1970s, some of the fire department's engines had to be stored in a substation on the outskirts of the city, because they would not fit in the firehouse. The population of the city reached 100,000 in 1970, an over tenfold increase in residents since the original firehouse was constructed.

The building was listed on the National Register of Historic Places in 1972, and the Ann Arbor Fire Department moved to a new station on the same block in 1978.

=== Hands-On Museum era ===
The Ann Arbor Hands-On Museum was founded in 1978, with approval from the city of Ann Arbor, as a touring collection of exhibits built by local specialists and volunteers. The museum opened at its permanent location in 1982 in the city's historic brick firehouse with 25 exhibits on two floors, one staff person, and ten volunteers.

During the museum's first year of operation, it welcomed 25,000 guests. Children and adults both expressed great curiosity and enthusiasm, which pushed the museum to accelerate its expansion plans. Four years later, the museum opened the third and fourth floors of the firehouse with the help of a Kresge Foundation Challenge Grant. In 1993, the museum purchased several adjoining buildings, which led to the introduction of expanded facilities and educational programs in October 1999. Five separate grants received over several years from the National Science Foundation funded the creation of new exhibits, including "How Things Work" and "Solve-It Central", which toured through many science museums throughout the United States and Canada.

The Ann Arbor Hands-On Museum now features over 250 interactive exhibits on subjects including physics, geology, math, music, and technology while entertaining over 200,000 visitors each year. More than just a local attraction, the now over 40,000 square foot museum has become a regional destination that draws more than 60 percent of its visitors from outside the Ann Arbor area. The Detroit Free Press named it the Best Museum in 2003, and the museum has also received national recognition by the National Science Foundation, the Institute of Museum and Library Services and the Association of Science and Technology Centers.

== Outreach programs ==
The Outreach Program began in 2000 to give children an opportunity to explore science in a classroom, library, festival, or youth center setting. The program covers a broad range of science topics, including biology, ecology, physics, chemistry, and math. All programs address objectives outlined in the Michigan Grade Level Content Expectations and include pre- and post-visit activities.

=== Types of outreach programs ===
Single Visit Workshops are for Pre K-8th grade classrooms. Series Workshops last anywhere from 3–12 weeks for classes that wish for more in-depth science exploration. Family Fun Science Nights include interactive science and math activities geared towards the whole family, encouraging parental involvement in their children's learning. The Virtual Distance Learning Program uses videoconferencing to engage students in an interactive program, and includes materials and a Teacher's Guide to help prepare for experiments in the classroom. The museum's latest program, Energy on the Road, is sponsored by the DTE Energy Foundation and plans to teach students about renewable energy.

== News and recognitions ==
The Ann Arbor Hands-On Museum has received numerous awards, grants, and publicity for its innovations and immersive learning experience, including a grant from the Michigan Council for Arts and Cultural Affairs (MCACA)

This museum's influences go farther than just those who visit. In 2013, the Ann Arbor Hands-On Museum partnered with C.S. Mott Children's Hospital and Von Voigtlander Women's Hospital, both in Ann Arbor, to help fund and implement the Healing Through Hands-On Science program. This program helps bring science and health related activities and exhibits to the museum and to the hospitals themselves to provide a more enriching stay. It also helps to provide fun activities for the siblings and families of patients at C.S. Mott Children's Hospital who may otherwise miss out on them from being out of school.

The museum has also paired up with the Mechanical Engineering department at the University of Michigan to win an Editor's Award for outstanding exhibitions at the Maker Faire in 2010 which was held at The Henry Ford in Dearborn. The students and faculty of the Mechanical Engineering department presented the inverted pendulum, much like those in a human transporter Segway, to highlight the importance of feedback controls and balance in systems. This exhibit can now be found at the museum and features a vertical pendulum that is driven by a motor at the end of a horizontal arm and uses sensors to keep the pendulum in its inverted position.

Among the technology and science driven exhibits at the museum is the Ferrofluid Magnetoscope. This interactive exhibit was created by Ann Arbor inventor Michael Flynn; his cooperatively controlled levitating liquid is one of over 250 to explore at the museum.

The museum building, the former Ann Arbor Central Fire Station, was built in 1882. It was added to the National Register of Historic Places in 1972.

== Museum exhibits ==
Permanent exhibits

- Concourse

An open lobby that visitors can engage in many fun activities including whisper dishes, the tornado, Building in a Building, Liquid Galaxy, The Inverted Pendulum and the water table.

- All About You

An exhibit that explores the human body. Visitors can climb aboard a full-sized Huron City Ambulance, hear their heartbeat and measure Physical fitness.

- Preschool Gallery

An area designed for children four years old and younger. Visitors can splash into the water tables, dress up like fire fighters and play on a child-sized fire engine.

- Legacy Gallery

Displays a variety of simply machines to present how seemingly complex systems work. Visitors can learn how traffic lights work, and the magnetisms behind Teslas Egg of Columbus.

- Michigan Nature Discover Room

A pure Michigan experience that includes a soundscape, an interactive nature wall, native lake fish and geology samples. Major funding for this exhibit provided by Hooked on Nature and the James A & Faith Knight Foundation with additional support from Friends of the Museum. Murals by Robert Zuboff and the scientific illustration students from the University of Michigan.

- World Around You

A gallery intended to spark the imagination of visitors. This exhibit features The Bubble Capsule, magnet exhibits, and a climbing wall.

- Lyon's Country Store Exhibit

This exhibit recreates a country store setting from the 1930s. It is one of the area's few exhibits that allows visitors to handle real, historic artifacts once found in general stores nearly a century ago. Inside the Country Store one can see how an old-fashioned cash register worked, listen to period music on a Victrola-like speaker, play a game of checkers on an old checkerboard set atop a barrel, and see old toys and games that children enjoyed decades ago. The store is a tribute to Bob Lyons, an avid collector of historic memorabilia and a founder of the Museum back in 1982.

- DTE Energy Foundation Light and Optics

Visitors can experience the characteristics of light and optics by playing the stringless Laser harp, breaking white light into the spectrum of colors it is made of, or catching one's shadow on the wall. Visitors can also watch how refraction bends light and distorts images, see how objects look different under light emitted by different materials, and observe how [Photon polarization|polarizing] light can change its brightness and color.

- Media Works

This exhibit helps visitors discover the science of television and telecommunications.

=== New exhibits ===
- Blast Off

Allows visitors to fill a rocket with pressurized air and launch a rocket into the air. Designed by Creative Machines, one can test how much pressure it takes for a rocket to reach the ceiling. Each rocket locks into place and fills with a variable amount of air pressure.

- Recollections

Visitors dance to a variety of music, a camera senses their movements and turns that into images

- Block Party II

The Block Party is a creative construction site for junior architects and engineers. Visitors can build towers and structures by using foam blocks.

- Magnetoscope

Allows people to manipulate magnetic fields to create amazing patterns in ferrofluid. Guests turn one of the cranks clockwise or counterclockwise to raise and lower the magnets and observe the fluid as it changes shape and shows changes in the magnetic field.
