= Children's museum =

Type of museum geared to children

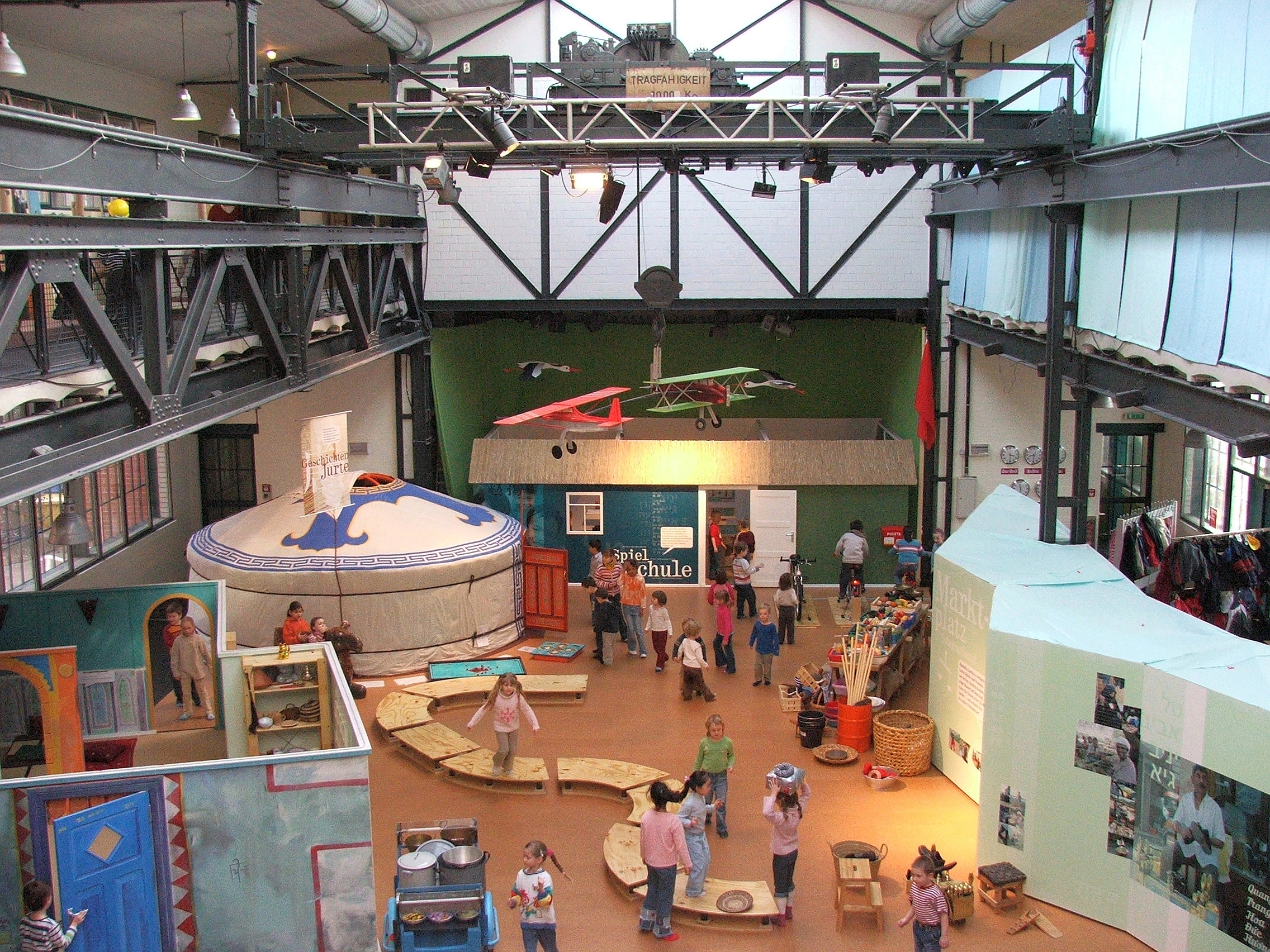
Labyrinth Kindermuseum Berlin

Children's museums are institutions that provide exhibits and programs to stimulate informal learning experiences for children. In contrast with traditional museums that typically have a hands-off policy regarding exhibits, children's museums feature interactive exhibits that are designed to be manipulated by children. The theory behind such exhibits is that activity can be as educational as instruction, especially in early childhood. Most children's museums are nonprofit organizations, and many are run by volunteers or by very small professional staffs.

International professional organizations of children's museums include the Association of Children's Museums (ACM), which was formed in 1962 as the American Association of Youth Museums (AAYM) and in 2007 counted 341 member institutions in 23 countries, and The Hands On! Europe Association of Children's Museum (HO!E), established in 1994, with member institutions in 34 countries as of 2007. Many museums that are members of ACM offer reciprocal memberships, allowing members of one museum to visit all the others for free or for a discounted fee.

== History ==
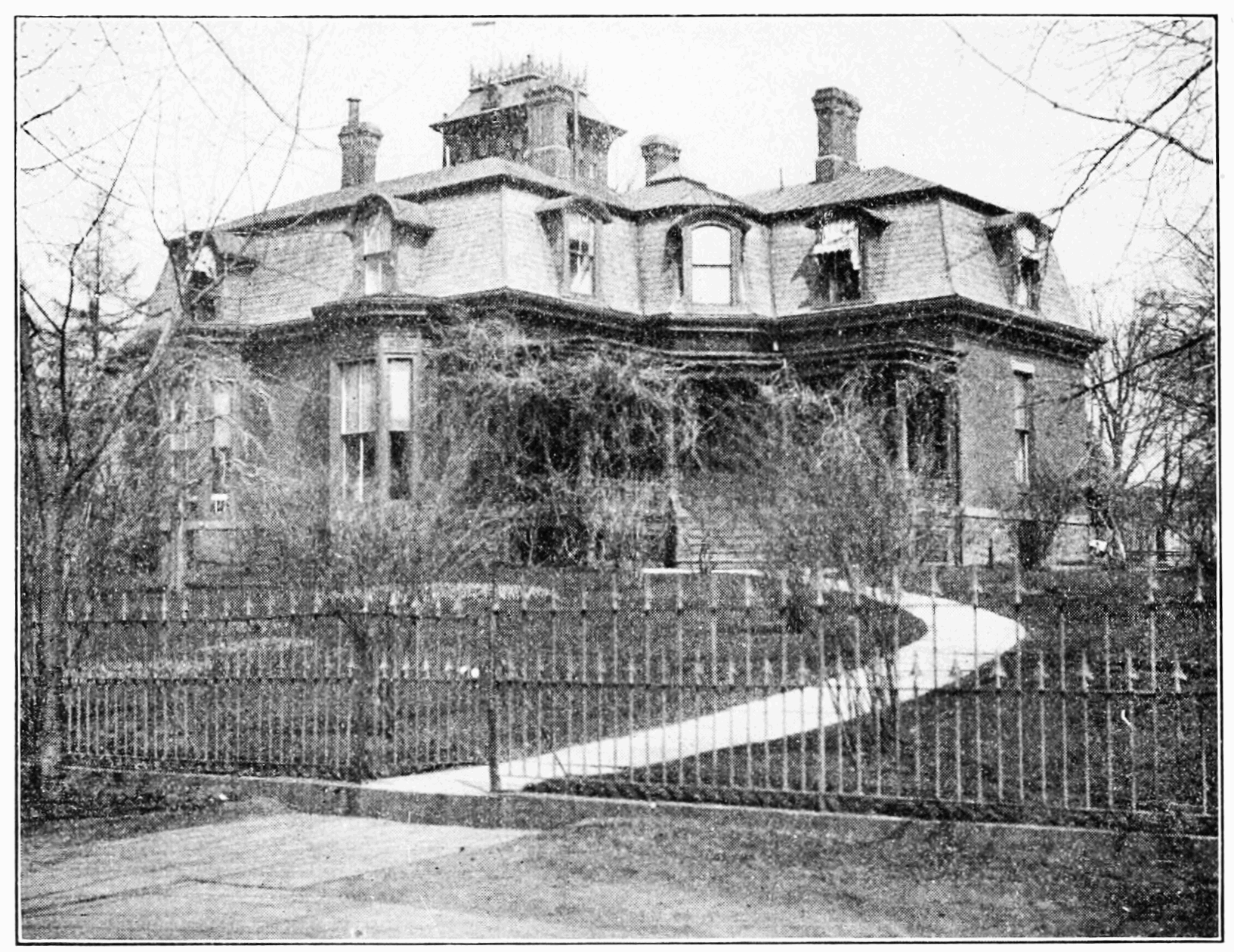
Brooklyn Children's Museum in 1908

The Brooklyn Children's Museum was established in 1899 by the Brooklyn Institute of Arts and Sciences. It is often regarded as the first children's museum in the United States. The idea behind the Brooklyn Children's Museum implicitly acknowledged that existing American museums were not designed with children in mind. Although museums at the turn of the century viewed themselves as institutions of public education, their exhibits were often not made accessible for children, who may have struggled with simple design features like the height of exhibit cases, or the language of interpretive labels. Furthermore, touching objects was often prohibited, limiting visitors' ability to interact with museum objects.

The founders of the Brooklyn Children's Museum were concerned with education and realized that no other institution had attempted to establish "a Museum that will be of especial value and interest to young people between the ages of six and twenty years". Their goal was to gain children's interest and "to stimulate their powers of observation and reflection" as well as to "illustrate by collections of pictures, cartoons, charts, models, maps and so on, each of the important branches of knowledge which is taught in elementary schools".

Anna Billings Gallup, the museum's curator from 1904 to 1937, encouraged a learning technique that allowed children to "discover" information by themselves through touching and examining objects. Visitors to the museum were able to compare the composition, weight, and hardness of minerals, learn to use a microscope to examine natural objects, and build their own collections of natural objects to be displayed in a special room of the museum. In addition to emphasis on allowing interaction with objects, Gallup also encouraged learning through play. She believed learning at the Brooklyn Children's Museum should be "pure fun", and to this end developed nature clubs, held field trips, brought live animals into the museum, and hired gallery instructors to lead children in classification games about animals, shells, and minerals. Other children's museums of the early twentieth century used similar techniques that emphasized learning through experience.

Children's museums often emphasize experiential learning through museum interactives, sometimes leading them to have very few or no physical collection items. The Brooklyn Children's Museum and other early children's museums grew out of the tradition of natural history museums, object-centered institutions. Over the course of the twentieth century, the children's museums slowly began to discard their objects in favor of more interactive exhibits. While children's museums are a more extreme case, during the twentieth century, more and more museums have elected to display fewer objects and offer more interpretation than museums of the nineteenth century. Some scholars argue that objects, while once critical to the definition of a museum, are no longer considered vital to many institutions because they are no longer necessary to fulfill the roles we expect museums to serve as museums focus more on programs, education, and their visitors.

After the Brooklyn Children's Museum opened in 1899, other American museums followed suit by opening small children's sections of their institutions designed with children in mind and equipped with interactive activities, such as the Smithsonian's children's room opened in 1901. The Brooklyn Children's Museum also inspired other children's museums either housed separately or even developed completely independently of parent museums, like the Boston Children's Museum (1913), The Children's Museum of Detroit Public Schools (1915), and the Children's Museum of Indianapolis (1925). The number of children's museums in the United States continued to grow over the course of the twentieth century, with over 40 museums opened by the 1960s and more than 70 children's museums opened to the public between 1990 and 1997.

The next earliest children's museums were:

- Boston Children's Museum (1913)
- The Detroit Children's Museum (1917)
- The Children's Museum of Indianapolis (1925) – according to the ACM, this is the world's largest children's museum.
- The Children's Museum (West Hartford, CT) (1927)
- Duluth Children's Museum (1930)

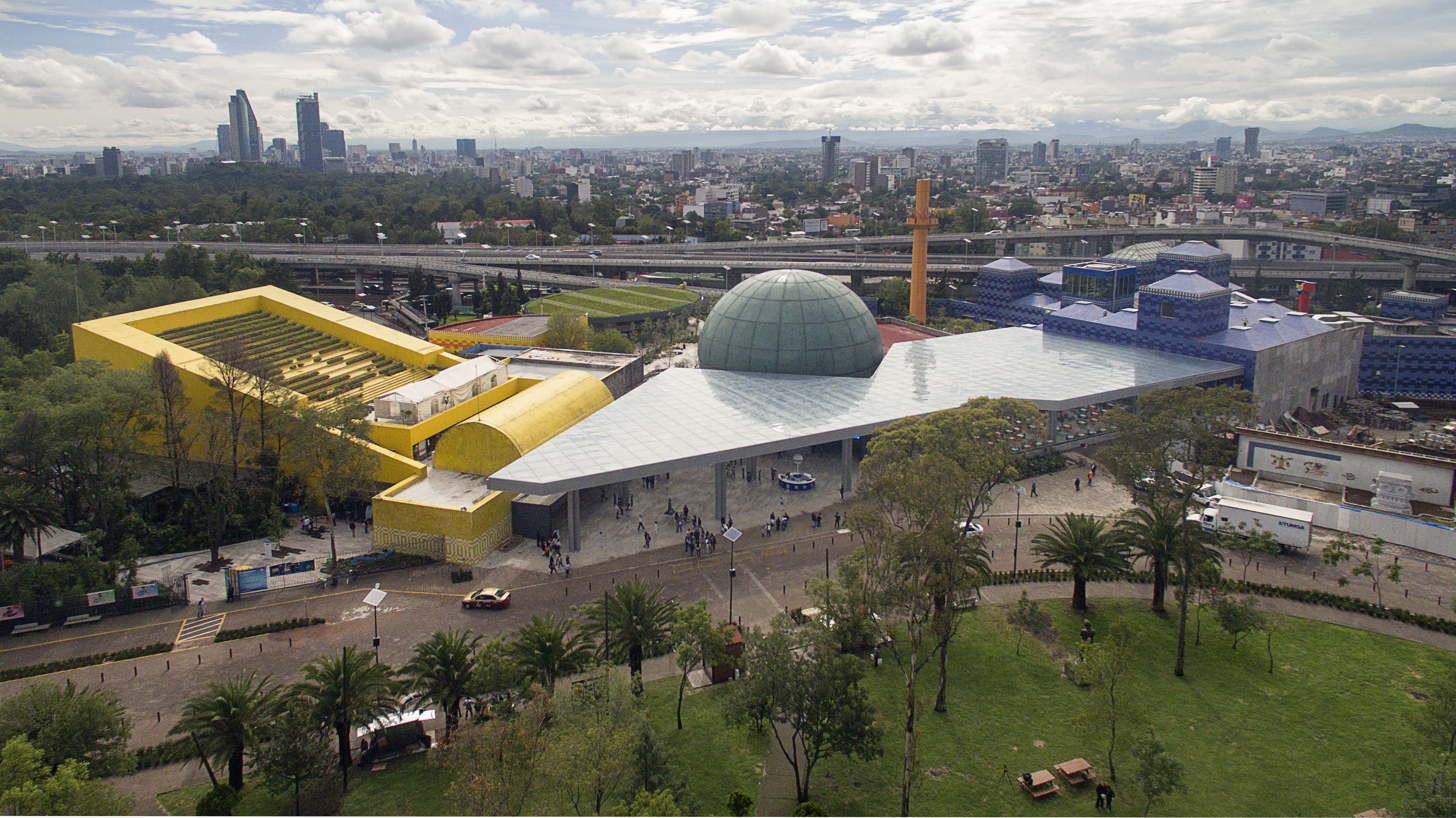
Papalote Museo del Niño in Mexico City

By 1975, there were approximately 38 children's museums in the United States. An additional 80 institutions opened between 1976 and 1990, and more than 130 opened between 1990 and 2007. As of 2007, ACM estimated that there were approximately 80 children's museums in the planning phase.

The children's museum concept has spread worldwide from the United States. Le Musée des Enfants in Brussels was started in 1978, inspired by Boston Children's Museum. The Boston museum also inspired the Museo Pambata in Manila, which opened in 1994. The Children's Museum of Caracas, Venezuela, became Latin America's first museum for children when it opened in 1982. The Children's Museum of Bogotá, Colombia, followed it in 1986. Eureka! The National Children's Museum in Halifax, England, established in 1992, claims the title of the United Kingdom's first hands-on children's museum. Austria's first museum for children was ZOOM Children's Museum in Vienna, established in 1994. Korea's first children's museum is the Samsung Children's Museum in Seoul, which opened in 1995 under the sponsorship of the Samsung Culture Foundation. India has seen rise in children's museums in recent years. The first children's museum in Japan is KIDS PLAZA OSAKA which was established in 1997. There is a children's Museum in the Canadian Museum of History. The Early Start Discovery Space in Wollongong, Australia opened in 2015 and was modelled on the US-styled children's museums., OliOli Children's Museum in Dubai, United Arab Emirates opened in 2017, the first of its kind in the GCC region, and was modelled on the US-styled children's museums.

== See also ==
- List of children's museums in the United States
- Museum of Childhood (disambiguation page)
- Toy museum
