= List of science centers in the United States =

This is a list of science centers in the United States. American Alliance of Museums (AAM) and Association of Science and Technology Centers (ASTC) member centers are granted institutional benefits and may offer benefits to individuals through purchased or granted individual memberships as well. ASTC offers a "passport" that allows for free general entry at all other participating ASTC member centers outside of a 90-mile radius of home. AAM offers a similar program that offers benefits to individuals.

AAM accredited museums have obtained a seal of approval from the AAM Accreditation Program that ensures a museum's "commitment to excellence, accountability, high professional standards and continued institutional improvement."

Name	City	State	AAM Accredited	AAM Member	ASTC Member	ASTC Passport
A. C. Gilbert's Discovery Village	Salem	Oregon	No	No	Yes	Yes
A. E. Seaman Mineral Museum	Houghton	Michigan	No	No	No	No
Above & Beyond Children's Museum	Sheboygan	Wisconsin	No	No	Yes	No
Academy of Natural Sciences of Drexel University	Philadelphia	Pennsylvania	Yes	Yes	Yes	Yes
Adler Planetarium	Chicago	Illinois	No	Yes	Yes	Yes
Adventure Science Center	Nashville	Tennessee	No	Yes	Yes	Yes
Aerospace Center for Excellence	Lakeland	Florida	No	No	Yes	Yes
Aerospace Museum of California	McClellan	California	No	Yes	No	No
Air Zoo	Portage	Michigan	No	Yes	Yes	Yes
Airlie Gardens	Wilmington	North Carolina	No	No	Yes	Yes
Alabama Museum of Health Sciences	Birmingham	Alabama	No	No	No	No
Alden B. Dow Museum of Science & Art	Midland	Michigan	Yes	No	Yes	Yes
Alfie Norville Gem & Mineral Museum	Tucson	Arizona	No	Yes	No	No
Amazement Square	Lynchburg	Virginia	No	No	Yes	No
American Computer & Robotics Museum	Bozeman	Montana	No	Yes	Yes	Yes
American Museum of Natural History	New York	New York	Yes	Yes	Yes	No
American Museum of Science and Energy	Oak Ridge	Tennessee	No	Yes	Yes	Yes
Ann Arbor Hands-On Museum	Ann Arbor	Michigan	No	No	Yes	Yes
Anniston Museum of Natural History	Anniston	Alabama	No	No	Yes	Yes
Arizona Science Center	Phoenix	Arizona	Yes	Yes	Yes	Yes
Arts and Science Center for Southeast Arkansas	Pine Bluff	Arkansas	Yes	Yes	No	No
Astronaut Memorial Planetarium and Observatory	Cocoa	Florida	No	No	No	No
Atlas Science Center	Appleton	Wisconsin	No	No	No	No
Aviation Museum of Kentucky	Lexington	Kentucky	No	Yes	Yes	Yes
Barlow Planetarium	Menasha	Wisconsin	No	No	Yes	Yes
Bay Area Discovery Museum	Sausalito	California	No	Yes	Yes	Yes
Bell Museum	Saint Paul	Minnesota	No	Yes	Yes	Yes
Bergen Museum of Art & Science	Hackensack	New Jersey	No	No	No	No
Berkshire Museum	Pittsfield	Massachusetts	No	Yes	Yes	Yes
Bess Bower Dunn Museum	Wauconda	Illinois	No	No	No	No
Birch Aquarium	La Jolla	California	No	No	No	No
Birds of Vermont Museum	Huntington	Vermont	No	No	No	No
Bisbee Science Exploration & Research Center	Bisbee	Arizona	No	No	Yes	No
Bishop Museum	Honolulu	Hawaii	Yes	Yes	Yes	No
Blue Telescope	New York	New York	No	No	Yes	No
Boonshoft Museum of Discovery	Dayton	Ohio	Yes	Yes	Yes	Yes
Bootheel Youth Museum	Malden	Missouri	No	Yes	Yes	Yes
Boston Children's Museum	Boston	Massachusetts	Yes	Yes	Yes	No
Bradbury Science Museum	Los Alamos	New Mexico	No	Yes	Yes	Yes
Brookhaven National Laboratory's Science Learning Center	Upton	New York	No	No	Yes	No
Brooklyn Children's Museum	Brooklyn	New York	No	Yes	Yes	Yes
Bruce Museum	Greenwich	Connecticut	Yes	Yes	Yes	Yes
Buena Vista Museum of Natural History & Science	Bakersfield	California	No	No	Yes	Yes
Buffalo Museum of Science	Buffalo	New York	Yes	Yes	Yes	Yes
Building for Kids	Appleton	Wisconsin	No	No	Yes	Yes
Burpee Museum of Natural History	Rockford	Illinois	No	No	Yes	Yes
Cade Museum for Creativity and Invention	Gainesville	Florida	No	Yes	Yes	Yes
Cal Poly Humboldt Natural History Museum	Arcata	California	No	No	Yes	Yes
California Academy of Sciences	San Francisco	California	Yes	Yes	Yes	No
California Science Center	Los Angeles	California	Yes	Yes	Yes	Yes
Cape Fear Museum of History and Science	Wilmington	North Carolina	Yes	No	Yes	Yes
Carnegie Museum of Montgomery County	Crawfordsville	Indiana	No	Yes	Yes	Yes
Carnegie Science Center	Pittsburgh	Pennsylvania	Yes	Yes	Yes	Yes
Catawba Science Center	Hickory	North Carolina	No	No	Yes	Yes
Centro Criollo de Ciencia y Tecnoliga del Caribe	Caguas	Puerto Rico	No	No	Yes	Yes
Cernan Earth and Space Center	River Grove	Illinois	No	No	Yes	Yes
Chabot Space & Science Center	Oakland	California	No	Yes	Yes	Yes
Challenger Center for Space Science Education	Tallahassee	Florida	No	No	Yes	Yes
Chicago Children's Museum	Chicago	Illinois	No	No	No	No
Children's Creativity Museum	San Francisco	California	No	No	Yes	Yes
Children's Discovery Museum	Normal	Illinois	No	Yes	Yes	Yes
Children's Discovery Museum of San Jose	San Jose	California	No	Yes	Yes	No
Imperial Centre for the Arts and Sciences	Rocky Mount	North Carolina	No	No	Yes	Yes
Children's Museum of Eau Claire	Eau Claire	Wisconsin	No	No	Yes	Yes
Children's Museum of Houston	Houston	Texas	Yes	Yes	Yes	Yes
Children's Museum of Illinois	Decatur	Illinois	No	No	Yes	Yes
Children's Museum of La Crosse	La Crosse	Wisconsin	No	No	Yes	Yes
Children's Museum of Pittsburgh	Pittsburgh	Pennsylvania	No	Yes	Yes	Yes
Children's Museum of Science and Technology	Troy	New York	No	No	No	No
Children's Museum of Virginia	Portsmouth	Virginia	No	Yes	Yes	Yes
Children's Museum Tucson	Tucson	Arizona	No	No	Yes	No
Children's Science Center	Fairfax	Virginia	No	Yes	Yes	Yes
Cincinnati Museum Center	Cincinnati	Ohio	Yes	Yes	Yes	Yes
Clark Planetarium	Salt Lake City	Utah	No	No	Yes	Yes
Clay Center (Charleston, West Virginia)	Charleston	West Virginia	Yes	Yes	Yes	Yes
Cleveland Museum of Natural History	Cleveland	Ohio	Yes	Yes	Yes	Yes
Coca-Cola Space Science Center	Columbus	Georgia	No	Yes	Yes	Yes
College Park Aviation Museum	College Park	Maryland	No	No	Yes	Yes
Columbia Memorial Space Center	Downey	California	No	Yes	Yes	Yes
Computer History Museum	Mountain View	California	No	No	Yes	No
Connecticut Science Center	Hartford	Connecticut	No	Yes	Yes	No
Corpus Christi Museum of Science and History	Corpus Christi	Texas	Yes	Yes	Yes	Yes
COSI	Columbus	Ohio	No	No	Yes	Yes
Cosmosphere	Hutchinson	Kansas	No	Yes	Yes	Yes
Cox Science Center and Aquarium	West Palm Beach	Florida	No	No	Yes	Yes
Cradle of Aviation	Garden City	New York	No	No	Yes	Yes
Cranbrook Institute of Science	Bloomfield	Michigan	No	No	Yes	Yes
Creative Discovery Museum	Chattanooga	Tennessee	No	No	Yes	No
CuriOdyssey	San Mateo	California	No	No	Yes	Yes
Da Vinci Science Center	Allentown	Pennsylvania	No	No	Yes	Yes
David J. Sencer CDC Museum	Atlanta	Georgia	No	Yes	Yes	No
Defense Nuclear Weapons School	Albuquerque	New Mexico	No	No	No	No
Delaware County Institute of Science	Media	Pennsylvania	No	No	No	No
Delaware Museum of Nature & Science	Wilmington	Delaware	No	No	Yes	Yes
Dennos Museum Center	Traverse City	Michigan	No	Yes	Yes	Yes
Denver Museum of Nature and Science	Denver	Colorado	Yes	Yes	Yes	Yes
DigiBarn Computer Museum	Boulder Creek	California	No	No	No	No
Dino Don, Inc.	Media	Pennsylvania	No	No	Yes	No
Discovery Center	Ocala	Florida	No	No	Yes	Yes
Discovery Center at Murfree Spring	Murfreesboro	Tennessee	No	No	Yes	Yes
Discovery Center Museum	Rockford	Illinois	No	No	Yes	Yes
Discovery Center of Idaho	Boise	Idaho	No	No	Yes	Yes
Discovery Center of Springfield	Springfield	Missouri	No	Yes	Yes	Yes
Discovery Children's Museum	Las Vegas	Nevada	No	No	No	No
Discovery Cube Orange County	Santa Ana	California	No	No	Yes	Yes
Discovery Gateway	Salt Lake City	Utah	No	No	No	No
Discovery Lab	Tulsa	Oklahoma	No	No	Yes	Yes
Discovery Museum	Acton	Massachusetts	No	No	Yes	No
Discovery Museum and Planetarium	Bridgeport	Connecticut	No	Yes	Yes	Yes
Discovery Park of America	Union City	Tennessee	No	Yes	Yes	Yes
Discovery Place	Charlotte	North Carolina	Yes	Yes	Yes	Yes
Discovery Space of Central Pennsylvania	State College	Pennsylvania	No	No	Yes	Yes
Discovery Station	Hagerstown	Maryland	No	Yes	Yes	Yes
Discovery World	Milwaukee	Wisconsin	No	No	Yes	Yes
Dittrick Museum of Medical History	Cleveland	Ohio	No	No	No	No
Don Harrington Discovery Center	Amarillo	Texas	No	No	Yes	Yes
Duluth Children's Museum	Duluth	Minnesota	No	No	Yes	Yes
EAA Aviation Museum	Oshkosh	Wisconsin	Yes	Yes	Yes	Yes
East Kentucky Science Center	Prestonsburg	Kentucky	No	No	Yes	Yes
ECHO, Leahy Center for Lake Champlain	Burlington	Vermont	No	No	Yes	Yes
EcoExploratorio	Guaynabo	Puerto Rico	No	No	Yes	No
EcoTarium	Worcester	Massachusetts	No	No	Yes	Yes
Edgerton Explorit Center	Aurora	Nebraska	No	No	Yes	Yes
EdVenture	Columbia	South Carolina	No	No	Yes	No
Eli Whitney Museum	Hamden	Connecticut	No	No	No	No
Ella Sharp Museum	Jackson	Michigan	Yes	Yes	Yes	No
Emerald Coast Science Center	Fort Walton Beach	Florida	No	Yes	Yes	Yes
Eugene Science Center	Eugene	Oregon	No	No	Yes	Yes
Evansville Museum of Arts, History and Science	Evansville	Indiana	Yes	Yes	Yes	Yes
Evergreen Aviation & Space Museum	McMinnville	Oregon	No	Yes	Yes	Yes
Explora	Albuquerque	New Mexico	No	Yes	Yes	Yes
Exploration Place	Wichita	Kansas	No	No	Yes	Yes
ExplorationWorks!	Helena	Montana	No	Yes	Yes	Yes
Exploratorium	San Francisco	California	No	No	Yes	Yes
Explore & More Children's Museum	Buffalo	New York	No	No	Yes	No
Explorit Science Center	Davis	California	No	No	Yes	Yes
Fairbanks Museum and Planetarium	St. Johnsbury	Vermont	Yes	No	Yes	Yes
Fairchild Tropical Botanic Garden	Miami	Florida	Yes	Yes	No	No
Family Museum	Bettendorf	Iowa	Yes	Yes	Yes	Yes
Fargo-Moorhead Science Museum	Fargo	North Dakota	No	Yes	No	No
Farmington Museum	Farmington	New Mexico	No	Yes	Yes	Yes
Fernbank Science Center	Atlanta	Georgia	No	No	Yes	Yes
Field Museum	Chicago	Illinois	No	Yes	Yes	Yes
Fiske Planetarium	Boulder	Colorado	No	No	Yes	Yes
Flandrau Science Center and Planetarium	Tucson	Arizona	No	Yes	Yes	Yes
Fleet Science Center	San Diego	California	No	No	Yes	Yes
Fleischmann Planetarium & Science Center	Reno	Nevada	No	No	Yes	Yes
Flint Children's Museum	Flint	Michigan	No	No	Yes	Yes
Flint Hills Discovery Center	Manhattan	Kansas	No	No	Yes	Yes
Florida Museum of Natural History	Gainesville	Florida	Yes	Yes	Yes	Yes
Food + Farm Exploration Center	Plover	Wisconsin	No	No	Yes	No
Fort Collins Museum of Discovery	Fort Collins	Colorado	Yes	Yes	Yes	Yes
Fort Discovery	Augusta	Georgia	No	No	No	No
Fort Worth Museum of Science and History	Fort Worth	Texas	Yes	Yes	Yes	Yes
Future of Flight Aviation Center & Boeing Tour	Mukilteo	Washington	No	Yes	No	No
Gateway Science Museum	Chico	California	No	No	Yes	Yes
Gillespie Museum	Deland	Florida	No	No	Yes	Yes
Glazer Children's Museum	Tampa	Florida	No	No	Yes	Yes
Grand Rapids Public Museum	Grand Rapids	Michigan	Yes	Yes	Yes	Yes
Great Explorations Children's Museum	Saint Petersburg	Florida	Yes	Yes	Yes	Yes
Great Lakes Science Center	Cleveland	Ohio	No	No	Yes	Yes
Great Valley Nature Center	Devault	Pennsylvania	No	No	No	No
Greensboro Science Center	Greensboro	North Carolina	Yes	Yes	Yes	Yes
Grout Museum	Waterloo	Iowa	Yes	Yes	Yes	Yes
Gulf Coast Exploreum Science Center	Mobile	Alabama	No	No	Yes	Yes
Gwinnett Environmental & Heritage Center	Buford	Georgia	No	No	No	No
Haffenreffer Museum of Anthropology	Providence	Rhode Island	No	Yes	Yes	Yes
Hagley Museum and Library	Wilmington	Delaware	Yes	Yes	Yes	Yes
Hands On! Discovery Center	Gray	Tennessee	No	No	Yes	Yes
Hands-On Science Center	Tullahoma	Tennessee	No	Yes	Yes	Yes
Happy Hollow Park & Zoo	San Jose	California	No	No	No	No
Harvard Museum of Natural History	Cambridge	Massachusetts	No	Yes	Yes	Yes
Hastings Museum of Natural and Cultural History	Hastings	Nebraska	Yes	Yes	Yes	Yes
Headwaters Science Center	Bemidji	Minnesota	No	No	Yes	Yes
Heard Natural Science Museum and Wildlife Sanctuary	McKinney	Texas	No	Yes	Yes	Yes
Highlands Museum and Discovery Center	Ashland	Kentucky	No	Yes	Yes	Yes
Historical and Cultural Society of Clay County	Moorhead	Minnesota	No	Yes	Yes	Yes
Hopewell Museum	Paris	Kentucky	No	Yes	Yes	Yes
Houston Museum of Natural Science	Houston	Texas	Yes	Yes	No	No
Hudson River Museum	Yonkers	New York	Yes	Yes	No	No
Huntington Botanical Gardens	San Marino	California	No	No	No	No
Huntington Museum of Art	Huntington	West Virginia	Yes	Yes	Yes	Yes
Hutchings Museum Institute	Lehi	Utah	No	Yes	Yes	Yes
Idaho Museum of Natural History	Pocatello	Idaho	No	Yes	Yes	Yes
Imaginarium Science Center	Fort Myers	Florida	No	No	Yes	Yes
Anchorage Museum at Rasmuson Center	Anchorage	Alaska	Yes	Yes	Yes	Yes
Imagination Station	Lafayette	Indiana	No	No	Yes	Yes
Imagination Station	Toledo	Ohio	No	Yes	Yes	Yes
Imagination Station Science Museum	Wilson	North Carolina	No	No	Yes	Yes
Imagine Children's Museum	Everett	Washington	Yes	Yes	Yes	Yes
ʻImiloa Astronomy Center	Hilo	Hawaii	No	No	Yes	No
Impression 5 Science Center	Lansing	Michigan	No	No	Yes	Yes
Indiana State Museum	Indianapolis	Indiana	Yes	Yes	Yes	Yes
INFINITY Science Center	Pearlington	Mississippi	No	No	Yes	No
InfoAge Science & History Center	Wall Township	New Jersey	No	No	Yes	No
Institute for Native Pacific Education and Culture	Kapolei	Hawaii	No	No	Yes	No
International Museum of Art & Science	McAllen	Texas	No	Yes	Yes	Yes
International Museum of Surgical Science	Chicago	Illinois	No	No	Yes	Yes
International Wildlife Museum	Tucson	Arizona	No	No	Yes	Yes
Intrepid Sea, Air & Space Museum	New York	New York	No	No	Yes	Yes
Iron Hill Museum	Newark	Delaware	No	No	Yes	Yes
Jet Propulsion Laboratory	Pasadena	California	No	No	Yes	No
Kalamazoo Valley Museum	Kalamazoo	Michigan	Yes	Yes	No	No
Kaleideum	Winston-Salem	North Carolina	No	No	Yes	Yes
Kentucky Science Center	Louisville	Kentucky	No	No	Yes	Yes
Kern County Museum	Bakersfield	California	No	No	No	No
Kidspace Children's Museum	Pasadena	California	No	Yes	Yes	Yes
KidsQuest Children's Museum	Bellevue	Washington	No	Yes	Yes	Yes
Kidzeum of Health and Science	Springfield	Illinois	No	No	Yes	Yes
Kiewit Luminarium	Omaha	Nebraska	No	Yes	No	No
Kingman Museum	Battle Creek	Michigan	No	Yes	Yes	Yes
Kitt Peak National Observatory	Tucson	Arizona	No	No	Yes	Yes
Knock Knock Children's Museum	Baton Rouge	Louisiana	No	No	Yes	No
Kopernik Observatory & Science Center	Vestal	New York	No	No	Yes	Yes
L. C. Bates Museum	Hinckley	Maine	No	Yes	Yes	No
Lake Superior Zoo	Duluth	Minnesota	No	No	Yes	Yes
Lakeview Museum of Arts and Sciences	Peoria	Illinois	No	No	No	No
Lancaster Science Factory	Lancaster	Pennsylvania	No	No	Yes	Yes
Lander Children's Museum	Lander	Wyoming	No	No	Yes	Yes
Las Cruces Museum of Nature and Science	Las Cruces	New Mexico	No	No	Yes	Yes
Las Vegas Natural History Museum	Las Vegas	Nevada	Yes	Yes	Yes	Yes
LaunchPAD Children's Museum	Sioux City	Iowa	No	No	Yes	Yes
Lawrence Hall of Science	Berkeley	California	No	No	Yes	Yes
Liberty Science Center	Jersey City	New Jersey	No	No	Yes	Yes
Lick Observatory	Mount Hamilton	California	No	No	Yes	Yes
LIGO Livingston	Livingston	Louisiana	No	No	Yes	No
Lindsay Wildlife Experience	Walnut Creek	California	No	No	Yes	Yes
Loggerhead Marinelife Center	Juno Beach	Florida	No	No	Yes	Yes
Long Island Children's Museum	Garden City	New York	Yes	Yes	Yes	Yes
Long Island Explorium	Port Jefferson	New York	No	No	Yes	Yes
Longview World of Wonders	Longview	Texas	No	No	Yes	Yes
Louisiana Arts and Science Museum	Baton Rouge	Louisiana	Yes	Yes	Yes	Yes
Louisiana Children's Museum	New Orleans	Louisiana	No	Yes	Yes	Yes
Lowell Observatory	Flagstaff	Arizona	No	No	Yes	Yes
Lutz Children's Museum	Manchester	Connecticut	No	No	Yes	Yes
Madison Children's Museum	Madison	Wisconsin	No	Yes	Yes	Yes
Madison Science Museum	Huntsville	Alabama	No	Yes	No	No
Maine Discovery Museum	Bangor	Maine	No	No	Yes	Yes
Marbles Kids Museum	Raleigh	North Carolina	No	Yes	Yes	Yes
Marian Koshland Science Museum	Washington	District of Columbia	No	No	No	No
Mary Brogan Museum of Art and Science	Tallahassee	Florida	No	No	No	No
Mary G. Hardin Center for Cultural Arts	Gadsden	Alabama	No	No	Yes	Yes
Maryland Science Center	Baltimore	Maryland	No	No	Yes	Yes
Maturango Museum	Ridgecrest	California	No	No	Yes	Yes
Mayborn Museum Complex	Waco	Texas	Yes	Yes	Yes	Yes
McAuliffe-Shepard Discovery Center	Concord	New Hampshire	No	No	Yes	Yes
McDonald Observatory	McDonald Observatory	Texas	No	No	Yes	Yes
William McKinley Presidential Library and Museum	Canton	Ohio	No	No	Yes	Yes
McWane Science Center	Birmingham	Alabama	No	No	Yes	Yes
Michigan Science Center	Detroit	Michigan	No	No	Yes	Yes
MICRO (organization)	Brooklyn	New York	No	No	Yes	No
Mid-America Science Museum	Hot Springs	Arkansas	No	Yes	Yes	Yes
Mid-Hudson Children's Museum	Poughkeepsie	New York	No	No	Yes	No
Midland Center for the Arts	Midland	Michigan	No	Yes	No	No
Milton J. Rubenstein Museum of Science and Technology	Syracuse	New York	No	Yes	Yes	Yes
Milwaukee Public Museum	Milwaukee	Wisconsin	Yes	Yes	Yes	Yes
Mimms Museums of Technology and Art	Roswell	Georgia	No	No	No	No
Mines Museum of Earth Science	Denver	Colorado	No	Yes	No	No
Minnesota Children's Museum	Saint Paul	Minnesota	No	Yes	Yes	Yes
Minnetrista	Muncie	Indiana	No	Yes	Yes	Yes
Museum of Innovation and Science	Schenectady	New York	No	No	Yes	Yes
Mississippi Children's Museum	Jackson	Mississippi	No	Yes	Yes	No
Mississippi Inquisitorium	Hattiesburg	Mississippi	No	No	Yes	No
Mississippi Museum of Natural Science	Jackson	Mississippi	Yes	Yes	Yes	Yes
MIT Museum	Cambridge	Massachusetts	Yes	No	Yes	No
Mobius Discovery Center	Spokane	Washington	No	No	Yes	Yes
Montana Natural History Center	Missoula	Montana	No	Yes	Yes	Yes
Montana Science Center	Bozeman	Montana	No	No	Yes	Yes
Montshire Museum of Science	Norwich	Vermont	No	Yes	Yes	No
Moonshot Museum	Pittsburgh	Pennsylvania	No	No	Yes	Yes
Morehead Planetarium and Science Center	Chapel Hill	North Carolina	No	No	Yes	Yes
Mount Washington Observatory	North Conway	New Hampshire	No	No	Yes	Yes
MOXI, The Wolf Museum of Exploration + Innovation	Santa Barbara	California	No	No	Yes	Yes
Muncie Children's Museum	Muncie	Indiana	No	No	Yes	Yes
Muse Knoxville	Knoxville	Tennessee	No	Yes	Yes	Yes
Museum of Arts and Sciences	Daytona Beach	Florida	Yes	Yes	Yes	Yes
Museum of Arts and Sciences (Macon)	Macon	Georgia	Yes	Yes	No	No
Museum of Coastal Carolina	Ocean Isle Beach	North Carolina	No	No	Yes	Yes
Museum of Discovery	Little Rock	Arkansas	Yes	Yes	Yes	Yes
Museum of Discovery and Science	Fort Lauderdale	Florida	Yes	Yes	Yes	Yes
Museum of Life and Science	Durham	North Carolina	No	No	Yes	Yes
Museum of Natural Curiosity	Lehi	Utah	No	No	No	No
Museum of Science	Boston	Massachusetts	Yes	Yes	Yes	Yes
Museum of Science & History	Memphis	Tennessee	No	Yes	Yes	Yes
Museum of Science & Industry (Tampa)	Tampa	Florida	Yes	Yes	Yes	Yes
Museum of Science and History	Jacksonville	Florida	Yes	Yes	Yes	Yes
Museum of Science and Industry	Chicago	Illinois	No	Yes	Yes	Yes
Museum of the Earth	Ithaca	New York	No	No	Yes	Yes
Museum of the Rockies	Bozeman	Montana	Yes	Yes	Yes	Yes
Mütter Museum	Philadelphia	Pennsylvania	No	No	No	No
National Air and Space Museum	Washington	District of Columbia	Yes	Yes	No	No
National Atomic Testing Museum	Las Vegas	Nevada	No	Yes	No	No
National Center for Atmospheric Research	Boulder	Colorado	No	No	Yes	No
National Children's Museum	Washington	District of Columbia	No	No	Yes	No
National Children's Museum	National Harbor	Maryland	No	No	No	No
National Cryptologic Museum	Fort Meade	Maryland	No	No	No	No
National Electronics Museum	Linthicum	Maryland	No	No	No	No
National Geographic Museum	Washington	District of Columbia	No	Yes	No	No
National Girls Collaborative Project	Seattle	Washington	No	No	Yes	No
National Museum of American History	Washington	District of Columbia	Yes	Yes	No	No
National Museum of Dentistry	Baltimore	Maryland	No	No	No	No
National Museum of Health and Medicine	Silver Spring	Maryland	No	Yes	No	No
National Museum of Mathematics	New York	New York	No	No	Yes	Yes
National Museum of Natural History	Washington	District of Columbia	Yes	Yes	Yes	No
National Museum of Nuclear Science & History	Albuquerque	New Mexico	Yes	Yes	Yes	Yes
National Museum of the U.S. Air Force	Wright-Patterson Air Force Base	Ohio	Yes	Yes	Yes	No
National Railroad Museum	Green Bay	Wisconsin	No	Yes	Yes	Yes
National Renewable Energy Laboratory	Golden	Colorado	No	No	No	No
National Soaring Museum	Elmira	New York	No	No	No	No
National Watch and Clock Museum	Columbia	Pennsylvania	No	No	Yes	Yes
Natural History Museum of Los Angeles County	Los Angeles	California	Yes	Yes	Yes	Yes
Natural History Museum of Utah	Salt Lake City	Utah	Yes	Yes	Yes	Yes
Nauticus	Norfolk	Virginia	No	No	Yes	Yes
Terry Lee Wells Nevada Discovery Museum	Reno	Nevada	No	Yes	No	No
Neville Public Museum of Brown County	Green Bay	Wisconsin	Yes	Yes	Yes	Yes
New Britain Youth Museum and Hungerford Nature Center	New Britain	Connecticut	No	Yes	Yes	Yes
New England Wireless and Steam Museum	East Greenwich	Rhode Island	No	No	No	No
New Jersey State Museum	Trenton	New Jersey	Yes	Yes	Yes	Yes
New Mexico Museum of Natural History and Science	Albuquerque	New Mexico	Yes	Yes	Yes	Yes
New Mexico Museum of Space History	Alamogordo	New Mexico	Yes	Yes	Yes	Yes
New York Hall of Science	Corona	New York	No	No	Yes	Yes
New York Hall of Science	Queens	New York	No	No	No	No
New York State Museum	Albany	New York	No	No	No	No
New York Transit Museum	Brooklyn	New York	No	Yes	Yes	Yes
Niagara Science Museum	Niagara Falls	New York	No	No	No	No
North Carolina Arboretum	Asheville	North Carolina	No	No	No	No
North Carolina Museum of Natural Sciences	Raleigh	North Carolina	Yes	Yes	Yes	Yes
North Carolina Transportation Museum	Spencer	North Carolina	No	No	Yes	Yes
North Dakota's Gateway to Science	Bismarck	North Dakota	No	No	Yes	Yes
North Museum of Nature and Science	Lancaster	Pennsylvania	Yes	Yes	Yes	Yes
Northern Maine Museum of Science	Presque Isle	Maine	No	No	No	No
Nurture Nature Center	Easton	Pennsylvania	No	No	Yes	No
Ocean Star Offshore Drilling Rig & Museum	Galveston	Texas	No	No	No	No
OH WOW! The Roger & Gloria Jones Children's Center for Science & Technology	Youngstown	Ohio	No	No	Yes	Yes
Omaha Children's Museum	Omaha	Nebraska	No	No	Yes	Yes
Oregon Museum of Science and Industry	Portland	Oregon	No	Yes	Yes	Yes
Orlando Science Center	Orlando	Florida	Yes	No	Yes	Yes
Orpheum Theatre (Champaign, Illinois)	Champaign	Illinois	No	No	No	No
Oscar E. Monnig Meteorite Gallery	Fort Worth	Texas	No	Yes	No	No
Owensboro Museum of Science and History	Owensboro	Kentucky	No	No	Yes	Yes
Owls Head Transportation Museum	Owls Head	Maine	No	No	Yes	Yes
Pacific Science Center	Seattle	Washington	No	No	Yes	Yes
Palouse Discovery Science Center	Pullman	Washington	No	No	Yes	Yes
Pavek Museum of Broadcasting	Minneapolis	Minnesota	No	Yes	No	No
Peggy Notebaert Nature Museum	Chicago	Illinois	No	No	Yes	Yes
Pensacola MESS Hall	Pensacola	Florida	No	No	Yes	Yes
Peoria PlayHouse Children's Museum	Peoria	Illinois	No	No	Yes	Yes
Peoria Riverfront Museum	Peoria	Illinois	No	Yes	Yes	Yes
Permian Basin Petroleum Museum	Midland	Texas	No	No	No	No
Perot Museum of Nature and Science	Dallas	Texas	Yes	Yes	Yes	Yes
Phillip and Patricia Frost Museum of Science	Miami	Florida	Yes	Yes	Yes	Yes
Pink Palace Family of Museums	Memphis	Tennessee	No	No	No	No
Pioneer Trails Regional Museum	Bowman	North Dakota	No	No	Yes	No
Placer Nature Center	Auburn	California	No	No	Yes	Yes
Port Discover: Northeastern North Carolina's Center for Hands-On Science	Elizabeth City	North Carolina	No	No	Yes	Yes
Process Curiosity, LLC	Salt Lake City	Utah	No	No	Yes	No
Providence Children's Museum	Providence	Rhode Island	No	No	Yes	Yes
Putnam Museum	Davenport	Iowa	Yes	Yes	Yes	Yes
Randall Museum	San Francisco	California	No	Yes	No	No
Raven Hill Discovery Center	Boyne City	Michigan	No	No	No	No
Reading Public Museum	Reading	Pennsylvania	Yes	Yes	Yes	Yes
Reading Science Center	Reading	Pennsylvania	No	Yes	Yes	No
Rhode Island Computer Museum	North Kingstown	Rhode Island	No	No	No	No
River Discovery Center	Paducah	Kentucky	No	Yes	Yes	Yes
Roberson Museum and Science Center	Binghamton	New York	Yes	Yes	Yes	Yes
Rochester Museum & Science Center	Rochester	New York	Yes	Yes	Yes	Yes
Roper Mountain Science Center	Greenville	South Carolina	No	No	Yes	Yes
Roseville Utility Exploration Center	Roseville	California	No	Yes	Yes	No
Saint Louis Science Center	Saint Louis	Missouri	Yes	Yes	Yes	Yes
San Antonio Museum of Science & Technology (SAMSAT)	San Antonio	Texas	No	Yes	No	No
San Diego Natural History Museum	San Diego	California	Yes	Yes	Yes	Yes
Santa Barbara Museum of Natural History	Santa Barbara	California	Yes	Yes	Yes	Yes
Santa Cruz Museum of Natural History	Santa Cruz	California	No	Yes	Yes	Yes
Schiele Museum of Natural History and Planetarium	Gastonia	North Carolina	Yes	Yes	Yes	Yes
Science and Discovery Center of Northwest Florida	Panama City	Florida	No	No	Yes	Yes
Science and Technology Education Innovation Center	Saint Petersburg	Florida	No	No	No	No
Science Center of Iowa	Des Moines	Iowa	No	Yes	Yes	Yes
Science Central	Fort Wayne	Indiana	No	No	Yes	Yes
Science City at Union Station	Kansas City	Missouri	No	Yes	Yes	Yes
Science Discovery Center of Oneonta	Oneonta	New York	No	No	No	No
Science History Institute	Philadelphia	Pennsylvania	No	No	No	No
Science Mill	Johnson City	Texas	No	No	Yes	No
Science Museum of Minnesota	Saint Paul	Minnesota	Yes	Yes	Yes	Yes
Science Museum of Virginia	Richmond	Virginia	Yes	Yes	Yes	Yes
Science Museum of Western Virginia	Roanoke	Virginia	No	No	Yes	Yes
Science Museum Oklahoma	Oklahoma City	Oklahoma	Yes	Yes	Yes	Yes
Science Spectrum	Lubbock	Texas	No	Yes	Yes	Yes
Science Vortex of the Verde Valley	Cottonwood	Arizona	No	No	Yes	Yes
Sciencenter	Ithaca	New York	Yes	Yes	Yes	Yes
ScienceWorks Museum (Ashland, Oregon)	Ashland	Oregon	No	No	Yes	Yes
Sci-Port Discovery Center	Shreveport	Louisiana	No	No	Yes	Yes
Sci-Tech Discovery Center	Frisco	Texas	No	No	Yes	No
Sci-Tech Museum	Watertown	New York	No	No	Yes	Yes
Scott Family Amazeum	Bentonville	Arkansas	No	Yes	Yes	Yes
SEE Science Center	Manchester	New Hampshire	No	No	Yes	Yes
Sloan Museum	Burton	Michigan	No	No	Yes	Yes
SMART-Center (Science, Math, Art, Research, and Technology)	Wheeling	West Virginia	No	No	Yes	No
SMUD Museum of Science and Curiosity (MOSAC)	Sacramento	California	No	Yes	Yes	Yes
Sony Wonder Technology Lab	New York	New York	No	No	No	No
South Dakota Discovery Center	Pierre	South Dakota	No	No	Yes	Yes
Southern Museum of Flight	Birmingham	Alabama	No	Yes	Yes	Yes
Space Center Houston	Houston	Texas	No	Yes	Yes	Yes
Space Foundation Discovery Center	Colorado Springs	Colorado	No	Yes	Yes	Yes
SPARK Museum of Electrical Invention	Bellingham	Washington	No	No	No	No
spectrUM Discovery Area	Missoula	Montana	No	No	Yes	Yes
SPI: Where Science and Play Intersect	Mount Vernon	Ohio	No	No	Yes	Yes
Springfield Museums	Springfield	Massachusetts	Yes	Yes	Yes	Yes
Springs Preserve	Las Vegas	Nevada	No	Yes	Yes	No
Stafford Air & Space Museum	Weatherford	Oklahoma	No	No	No	No
Staten Island Children's Museum	Staten Island	New York	No	No	No	No
Staten Island Institute of Arts and Sciences	Staten Island	New York	No	No	No	No
Stepping Stones Museum for Children	Norwalk	Connecticut	No	No	Yes	Yes
Sternberg Museum of Natural History	Hays	Kansas	No	No	Yes	Yes
Sunriver Nature Center	Sunriver	Oregon	No	No	Yes	Yes
Swaner Preserve and EcoCenter	Park City	Utah	No	No	Yes	No
Tellus Science Museum	Cartersville	Georgia	No	Yes	Yes	Yes
Terre Haute Children's Museum	Terre Haute	Indiana	No	No	Yes	Yes
Terry Lee Wells Nevada Discovery Museum	Reno	Nevada	No	No	Yes	Yes
Tesla Science Center at Wardenclyffe	Shoreham	New York	No	No	Yes	No
Texas Air & Space Museum	Amarillo	Texas	No	Yes	No	No
Texas Science & Natural History Museum	Austin	Texas	No	Yes	Yes	No
The Bakken Museum	Minneapolis	Minnesota	No	Yes	Yes	Yes
Bishop Museum of Science and Nature	Bradenton	Florida	No	Yes	Yes	Yes
The Children's Museum	West Hartford	Connecticut	No	No	Yes	Yes
The Children's Museum of Indianapolis	Indianapolis	Indiana	Yes	Yes	Yes	No
The Children's Museum of New Hampshire	Dover	New Hampshire	No	No	Yes	Yes
The Children's Museum of the Brazos Valley	Bryan	Texas	No	No	Yes	Yes
The Corning Museum of Glass	Corning	New York	Yes	Yes	Yes	Yes
The Discovery Science Place	Tyler	Texas	No	No	Yes	Yes
The DoSeum	San Antonio	Texas	No	No	Yes	Yes
The Franklin Institute	Philadelphia	Pennsylvania	Yes	Yes	Yes	Yes
The Health Museum	Houston	Texas	No	Yes	Yes	Yes
The Henry Ford	Dearborn	Michigan	Yes	Yes	Yes	No
The Leonardo	Salt Lake City	Utah	No	No	Yes	Yes
Living Arts and Science Center	Lexington	Kentucky	No	No	Yes	Yes
The Museum of Flight	Seattle	Washington	Yes	Yes	Yes	Yes
The Newark Museum of Art	Newark	New Jersey	Yes	Yes	No	No
The Powerhouse	Durango	Colorado	No	No	Yes	Yes
Reach Museum	Richland	Washington	No	No	Yes	Yes
The Science Center	Carbondale	Illinois	No	No	Yes	Yes
The Science Zone	Casper	Wyoming	No	No	Yes	Yes
The Science Zone	Mills	Wyoming	No	Yes	No	No
State Museum of Pennsylvania	Harrisburg	Pennsylvania	Yes	Yes	Yes	Yes
The Tech Interactive	San Jose	California	No	Yes	Yes	Yes
The Wild Center	Tupper Lake	New York	No	Yes	Yes	No
The Works (science museum)	Bloomington	Minnesota	No	No	Yes	Yes
The Works: Ohio Center for History, Art and Technology	Newark	Ohio	No	Yes	Yes	Yes
Thinkery	Austin	Texas	No	No	Yes	Yes
Trolley Museum of New York	Kingston	New York	No	No	No	No
Tulsa Air and Space Museum & Planetarium	Tulsa	Oklahoma	No	Yes	No	No
Turtle Bay Exploration Park	Redding	California	No	No	Yes	Yes
U.S. Space & Rocket Center	Huntsville	Alabama	No	No	Yes	Yes
United States Army Medical Department Museum	San Antonio	Texas	No	No	No	No
United States Naval Undersea Museum	Keyport	Washington	Yes	Yes	No	No
University of Kansas Natural History Museum	Lawrence	Kansas	No	Yes	Yes	Yes
University of Michigan Museum of Natural History	Ann Arbor	Michigan	No	Yes	Yes	Yes
University of Nebraska State Museum	Lincoln	Nebraska	Yes	Yes	Yes	Yes
University of Oregon Museum of Natural and Cultural History	Eugene	Oregon	Yes	Yes	Yes	Yes
USS Silversides Submarine Museum	Muskegon	Michigan	No	No	Yes	Yes
Virginia Air and Space Science Center	Hampton	Virginia	No	No	Yes	Yes
Virginia Aquarium	Virginia Beach	Virginia	No	No	Yes	Yes
Virginia Discovery Museum	Charlottesville	Virginia	No	No	Yes	Yes
Virginia Living Museum	Newport News	Virginia	Yes	Yes	Yes	Yes
Virginia Museum of Natural History	Martinsville	Virginia	Yes	Yes	Yes	Yes
Warren Anatomical Museum	Boston	Massachusetts	No	No	No	No
Washington Pavilion of Arts and Science	Sioux Falls	South Dakota	No	Yes	Yes	Yes
Wedell-Williams Aviation & Cypress Sawmill Museum - Patterson	Patterson	Louisiana	Yes	Yes	No	No
Wenatchee Valley Museum & Cultural Center	Wenatchee	Washington	No	Yes	Yes	Yes
Western North Carolina Nature Center	Asheville	North Carolina	No	No	Yes	Yes
Western Science Center	Hemet	California	No	Yes	Yes	Yes
Whitaker Center for Science and the Arts	Harrisburg	Pennsylvania	No	No	Yes	Yes
Wings of Eagles Discovery Center	Horseheads	New York	No	No	Yes	Yes
Wings Over the Rockies Air and Space Museum	Denver	Colorado	No	Yes	Yes	Yes
Witte Museum	San Antonio	Texas	Yes	Yes	Yes	Yes
WonderLab	Bloomington	Indiana	No	No	Yes	Yes
Woods Hole Oceanographic Institution	Woods Hole	Massachusetts	No	No	Yes	Yes
World Fossil Finder Museum	Hot Springs	South Dakota	No	Yes	No	No
World of Wonders Science Museum	Lodi	California	No	No	Yes	Yes
Yakima Valley Museum	Yakima	Washington	Yes	Yes	Yes	No
Yale Peabody Museum of Natural History	New Haven	Connecticut	Yes	Yes	Yes	No
Yankee Air Museum	Belleville	Michigan	No	No	Yes	No

== See als ==
- List of museums in the United States
- List of natural history museums in the United States
- List of science museums
- List of university museums in the United States
