= List of museums in Nevada =

This list of museums in Nevada encompasses museums which are defined for this context as physical institutions, (including nonprofit organizations, government entities, and private businesses) that collect and care for objects of cultural, artistic, scientific, or historical interest and make their collections or related exhibits available for public viewing. Defunct museums are listed in a separate section.

== Museums ==
Name	Location	County	Type	Summary
Atomic Testing Museum	Las Vegas	Clark	Science	History of nuclear testing at the Nevada Test Site
Austin Historical Society Museum	Austin	Lander	Local history	
The Auto Collections	Paradise	Clark	Automobile	Showroom and display of classic cars at the Imperial Palace Hotel and Casino
Battle Mountain Cookhouse Museum	Battle Mountain	Lander	Local history	website
Beatty Museum	Beatty	Nye	Local history	website, area fossils, wildlife and plants, mining, ghost towns
Boulder City/Hoover Dam Museum	Boulder City	Clark	History	History of the Boulder Canyon Project, operated by the Boulder City Museum and Historical Association in the historic Boulder Dam Hotel
Bowers Mansion	Carson City	Carson City	Historic house	
Brothel Art Museum	Crystal	Nye	Erotica	
Buckaroo Hall of Fame & Heritage Museum	Winnemucca	Humboldt	Culture	website, artwork, photos, memorabilia, saddles, guns, hand-woven lariats, brands and other working gear used by cowboys, located at the Winnemucca Convention Center
Burlesque Hall of Fame	Las Vegas	Clark	Hall of fame	History of burlesque
Carson City Fire Museum	Carson City	Carson City	Fire fighting	website, also known as Warren Engine Co. No. 1 Museum
Carson Valley Museum & Cultural Center	Gardnerville	Douglas	Local history	Operated by the Douglas County Historical Society
Central Nevada Museum	Tonopah	Nye	Local history	website, photos, exhibits include Tonopah Army Air Field, area railroads and mining equipment, operated by the Central Nevada Historical Society
Children's Museum of Northern Nevada	Carson City	Carson City	Children's	website
Churchill County Museum & Archives	Fallon	Churchill	Local history	website, exhibits include Native American and pioneer artifacts, period rooms, railroads, antique communications equipment and vehicles, Woodliff Novelty Store, post
Clark County Museum	Henderson	Clark	Open-air	Includes museum with local history exhibits, minerals display, 1920s and 1950s period homes, 1900s replica print shop, depot with steam engine and caboose
Comstock Fireman's Museum	Virginia City	Storey	Fire fighting	website
Comstock Gold Mill	Virginia City	Storey	Mining	
Comstock History Center	Virginia City	Storey	Local history	
Courthouse Museum Genoa	Genoa	Douglas	Local history	website, operated by the Douglas County Historical Society, features period room displays including a courtroom, kitchen, nursery, Victorian parlor, blacksmith shop
Dayton Museum	Dayton	Lyon	Local history	website, includes pioneer memorabilia, quilts, and photographs from Dayton's history, including pioneers, prospectors and miners, woodcutters, Native Americans, Chinese, Italians, ranching, railroading, the Sutro Tunnel
Don Laughlin's Classic Car Collection	Laughlin	Clark	Automobile	Showroom and display of classic cars at the Riverside Resort Hotel & Casino
Donna Beam Fine Art Gallery	Las Vegas	Clark	Art	website, part of the University of Nevada, Las Vegas
Erotic Heritage Museum	Las Vegas	Clark	Erotica	History of erotica
Eureka Sentinel Museum	Eureka	Eureka	Local history	website, photos, features newspaper printing room, mining exhibits, period room displays
Fleischmann Planetarium & Science Center	Reno	Washoe	Science	Part of the University of Nevada, Reno, public star shows, astronomy exhibits, meteorites
Foreman-Roberts House Museum	Carson City	Carson City	Historic house	Open by appointment and for special events
Fort Churchill State Historic Park	Silver Springs	Lyon	History	Visitor center features exhibits about the fort's history
Fourth Ward School Museum	Virginia City	Storey	Local history	City history, mining, 19th century education
Frank Chang Memorial Museum	Lovelock	Pershing	Ethnic - Chinese	Located adjacent to the Cadillac Inn, artifacts from ruins of Lovelock's Chinatown
Goldwell Open Air Museum	Rhyolite	Nye	Art	Outdoor sculpture park
Great Basin National Park	Rhyolite	White Pine	Natural history	Visitor centers feature exhibits about the geology, natural history and cultural history of the area
Hawthorne Ordnance Museum	Hawthorne	Mineral	Military	Exhibits on ordance & munitions.
Howard W. Cannon Aviation Museum	Paradise	Clark	Aviation	History of commercial and general aviation in southern Nevada, located at McCarran International Airport
Humboldt Museum	Winnemucca	Humboldt	Local history	website, includes castings of mammoth bones, period rooms, Native American, pioneer and cowboy artifacts, 899 Richardson-Saunders House, 1907 St. Mary's Episcopal Church, and the 1880s Greinstein Building, operated by the North Central Nevada Historical Society
International Museum and Library of the Conjuring Arts	Las Vegas	Clark	Magic	Created by magician David Copperfield, includes magic memorabilia, books, illusions, posters, photos and artifacts, items from Harry Houdini, open to scholars
Julia C. Bulette Red Light Museum	Virginia City	Storey	Erotica	Madam Julia Bulette, prostitution erotica, Chinese art and antique medical equipment
Las Vegas Historical Society	Las Vegas	Clark	Local history	Timeline of city history, includes old railroad, celebrity, aerial, and casino photos
Las Vegas International Scout Museum	Las Vegas	Clark	Scouting	website
Las Vegas Natural History Museum	Las Vegas	Clark	Natural history	Includes dinosaurs, Ancient Egypt, international wildlife, Nevada desert wildlife, marine animals, geology
Las Vegas Springs Preserve	Las Vegas	Clark	Multiple	180-acre (0.73 km^{2}) preserve with several museums and botanical garden
Lied Discovery Children's Museum	Las Vegas	Clark	Children's	Interactive exhibits in science, arts and culture
Lincoln County Historical Museum	Pioche	Lincoln	Local history	photos
Lost City Museum	Overton	Clark	Archaeology	Excavated artifacts from Anasazi pueblo ruins
Lyon County Museum	Yerington	Lyon	Open-air	website, features 7 buildings including museum with period room and business displays, model railroad, local art, natural history, local pioneers, three old country schools, a general store and a blacksmith shop
Mackay Mansion	Virginia City	Storey	Historic house	website, Mid 19th-century mansion with period furnishings, mining artifacts
Madame Tussauds Las Vegas	Las Vegas	Clark	Wax museum	
Marjorie Barrick Museum of Art	Las Vegas	Clark	Art	Part of University of Nevada, Las Vegas, exhibitions of contemporary visual fine arts, Mesoamerican artifacts
Mark Twain Museum at the Territorial Enterprise	Virginia City	Storey	History	Historic newspaper building with Mark Twain's desk, press area and printing equipment
Marshall Mint Museum	Virginia City	Storey	Natural history	Gems and mineral display in a jewelry store
Marzen House Museum	Lovelock	Pershing	Local history	Includes mining equipment, home fixtures, Native American artifacts and an Indian Cave exhibit
McGill Drugstore Museum	McGill	White Pine	Local history	Historic drugstore open by appointment, operated by the White Pine Public Museum
Mineral County Museum	Hawthorne	Mineral	Local history	Exhibits on Mineral County
Mob Museum	Las Vegas	Clark	History	History of organized crime in the United States and activities of law enforcement, housed in the former Las Vegas Post Office and Courthouse
Mormon Station State Historic Park	Genoa	Douglas	Local history	Recreated trading post stockade and museum with pioneer exhibits
The Museum of Hollywood Aviation	Las Vegas	Clark	Aviation	Coming soon. Will feature aircraft from contemporary Hollywood films and entertainers. website
National Automobile Museum	Reno	Washoe	Transportation - automobile	
Neon Museum	Las Vegas	Clark	Media	Neon signs
Nevada Gambling Museum	Virginia City	Storey	Industry - gambling	Antique slot machines, gaming tables and roulette wheels
Nevada Historical Society	Reno	Washoe	History	website, history and culture of Nevada
Nevada Museum of Art	Reno	Washoe	Art	
Nevada Northern Railway Museum	Ely	White Pine	Railroad	Historic railroad yard complex, heritage railroad, includes the East Ely Railroad Depot Museum
Nevada Southern Railroad Museum	Boulder City	Clark	Railroad	
Nevada State Capitol	Carson City	Carson City	History	
Nevada State Museum, Carson City	Carson City	Carson City	Multiple	History, pre-history and natural history of Nevada
Nevada State Museum, Las Vegas	Las Vegas	Clark	Multiple	Frontier history, natural history, archaeology and anthropology of southern Nevada, development of the city
Nevada State Railroad Museum	Carson City	Carson City	Railroad	
Northeastern Nevada Museum	Elko	Elko	Multiple	website, history, art, natural history
Old Las Vegas Mormon Fort State Historic Park	Las Vegas	Clark	History	Restored fort and visitor center with related exhibits
Pahrump Valley Museum	Pahrump	Nye	Multiple	website, includes Abraham Lincoln memorabilia collection, farm equipment, general store, school house, silo and buildings from the Bowman Ranch, Native American artifacts, prospecting, ranching and farming exhibits, war ephemera, fossils, rock and minerals, area wildlife
Pierre Fauchard Museum	Las Vegas	Clark	Medical	website, part of the College of Southern Nevada, history of dentistry, named after Pierre Fauchard, considered the "father of modern dentistry"
Pinball Hall of Fame	Las Vegas	Clark	Amusement	Working pinball machines from the 1950s to 1990s
Pyramid Lake Museum & Visitors Center	Nixon	Washoe	Native American	website, Pyramid Lake Paiute Tribe's history, culture, people and current events
Searchlight Historical Museum	Searchlight	Clark	Local history	information, exhibits include mining, costume designer Edith Head, pilot John A. Macready, Senator Harry Reid, composer Scott Joplin; housed inside the Searchlight Community Center
Shelby Museum	Las Vegas	Clark	Transportation	
Sheppard Contemporary Gallery	Reno	Washoe	Art	website, part of University of Nevada, Reno
Sierra Arts Gallery	Reno	Washoe	Art	website, operated by the Sierra Arts Foundation
Sparks Museum & Cultural Center	Sparks	Washoe	Multiple	website, area history, ranching, mining, space industry, art exhibits, replica depot with vintage steam locomotive, cupola caboose and Pullman executive car, restored one room schoolhouse
St. Mary's Art & Retreat Center	Virginia City	Storey	Art	website, located in the former St. Mary Louise Hospital for the Comstock miners
St. Mary's in the Mountains Catholic Church	Virginia City	Storey	Religious	Historic church with museum about its history
Terry Lee Wells Nevada Discovery Museum	Reno	Washoe	Children's	science, technology, engineering, art, math and the world
Thunderbird Lodge	Incline Village	Washoe	Historic house	Waterfront estate on Lake Tahoe
Thunderbirds Museum	Nellis Air Force Base	Clark	Aerospace	History of the United States Air Force Thunderbirds, includes a Thunderbirds aircraft static display
Tonopah Historic Mining Park	Tonopah	Nye	Mining	website, former silver mine
University of Nevada, Reno Fine Art Galleries	Reno	Washoe	Art	website, four galleries and art exhibited in locations around the campus
Virgin Valley Heritage Museum	Mesquite	Lincoln	Local history	Area pioneers and local history
W. M. Keck Earth Science and Mineral Engineering Museum	Reno	Washoe	Geology	Part of the Mackay School of Earth Sciences and Engineering, minerals, ores, fossil specimens, and mining relics and displays
Walker African American Museum	Las Vegas	Clark	African American	
Washoe Club	Virginia City	Storey	History	Tours of the historic social club building that is considered a haunted location
The Way It Was Museum	Virginia City	Storey	Mining	Features Comstock mining artifacts and photographs
Western Folklife Center	Elko	Elko	Art	website, exhibitions, performances and educational programs about the American West
White Pine Public Museum	Ely	White Pine	Local history	website, photos
White River Valley Museum	Lund	White Pine	Local history	Features relics of one of the last colonization efforts of the Mormons in the American West
Wilbur D. May Center	Reno	Washoe	Multiple	Includes eclectic ethnographic collection, arboretum and botanical garden, temporary/traveling exhibits and art shows

== Defunct museums ==
- American Heroes Veteran Museum, Laughlin in the Ramada Express Hotel
- Casino Legends Hall of Fame Museum, in the Tropicana Resort & Casino, Las Vegas
- Debbie Reynolds' Movie Museum, in the Convention Center Drive Hotel-Casino, Las Vegas
- Elvis-A-Rama Museum - Las Vegas - biography
- Guggenheim Hermitage Museum - Las Vegas - art
- Guinness World Records Museum, Las Vegas
- Hispanic Museum of Nevada, Las Vegas, closed in 2017
- Houdini's Museum, Las Vegas, closed in 2004
- King Tut Exhibit, formerly at the Luxor, Las Vegas
- Las Vegas Art Museum, Las Vegas, closed in 2009.
- Liberace Museum, Las Vegas, closed in 2010, collections on traveling display
- Liberty Belle Slot Collection, closed in 2006, located at the Liberty Belle Casino in Reno, now displayed at the Nevada State Museum, Carson City
- Lost Vegas Historical Gambling Museum, Las Vegas
- Magic and Movie Hall of Fame, located in O'Shea's Casino
- Midas Schoolhouse, destroyed by fire in 2005
- Silver State National Peace Officers Museum, Virginia City, now on online museum known as the American Peace Officer Virtual Museum
- Star Trek: The Experience - The History of the Future Museum, Las Vegas Hilton, closed 2008, may reopen in the Neonopolis Mall in Las Vegas
- Stewart Indian School Museum, closed in the late 1990s, campus still open for walking tours, website
- Sunbelt Auto Museum, Las Vegas, private collection of Jim Rogers, collection sold at auction in 2015
- Western Historic Radio Museum, Virginia City, closed in 2012
- World of Coca-Cola, Las Vegas

== See also ==
- Aquaria in Nevada (category)
- Botanical gardens in Nevada (category)
- Nature Centers in Nevada
