= Tonopah Historic Mining Park =

Museum and historic site in Tonopah, Nevada, United States

Coordinates: 38.069°N 117.229°W

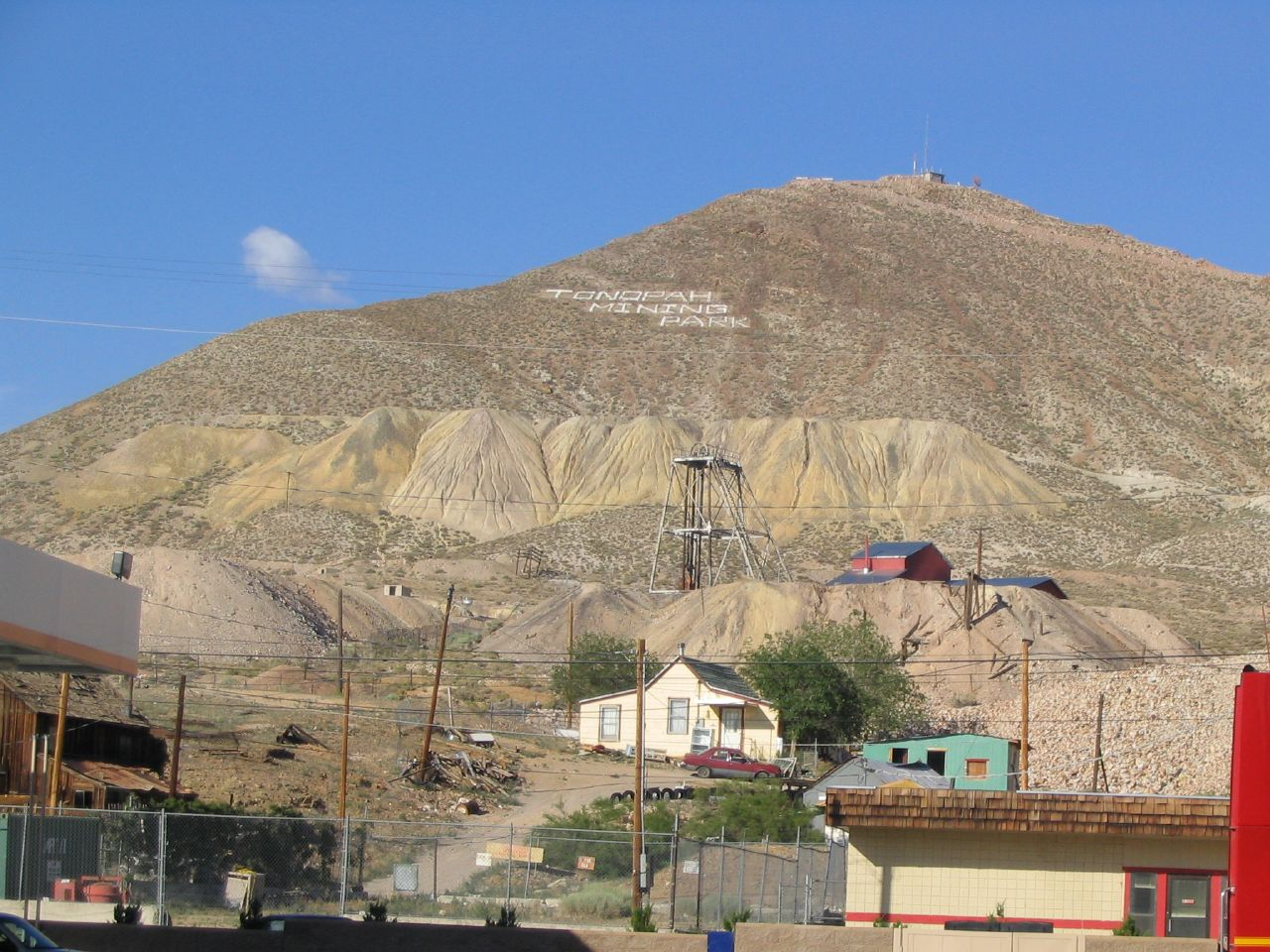

- 110 Burro Street, Tonopah, Nevada, United States
- Established: 1992
- Location: Tonopah, Nevada, United States
- Type: Historical site
- Website: www.tonopahminingpark.com

The Tonopah Historic Mining Park is a defunct mining area in Tonopah, Nevada, United States, that now serves as a museum and historical site. The site covers 113-acre of land. It is currently operated by the non-profit foundation named after the park.

== History ==
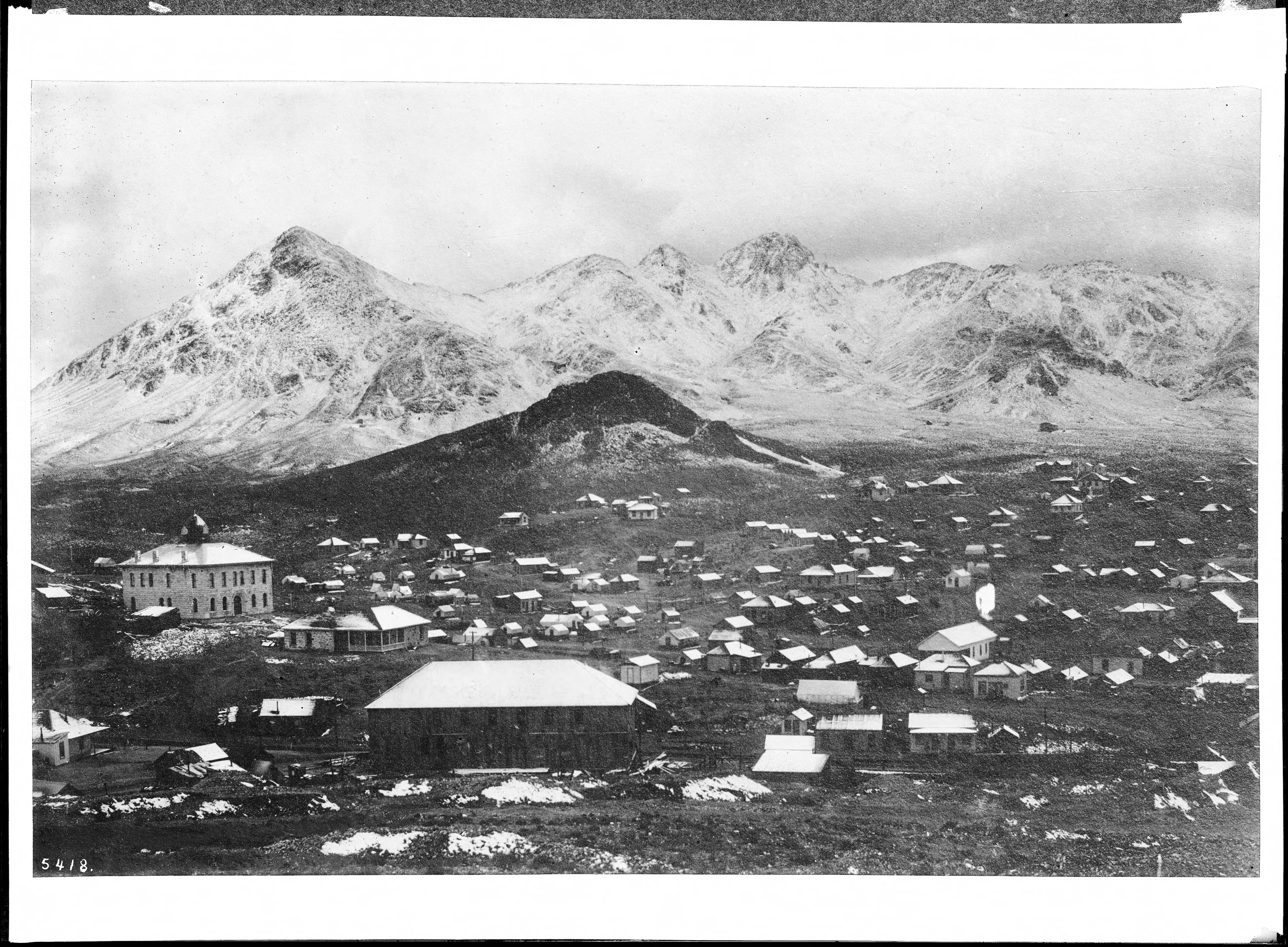
Tonopah Mining Park, ca. 1904

The area where the Tonopah Historic Mining Park is located was part of the mining operations done by several Tonopah mining companies, including Tonopah Mining Company, founded in 1901. A commonly repeated lore of how silver was discovered in these mines was through the story of Jim Butler, who accidentally stumbled upon it when he was going to throw a rock (which happened to be a silver ore) to his mule. Through the help of his friend Tasker Oddie, Jim and his wife, Belle, would later found out the value of the ore, and with several others, would offer mine leasing rights for the area. Eventually, the Butlers would sell their mine leasing claim to the Tonopah Mining Company, though the company itself would eventually cease to operate by 1956. The area where the mine used to be remains largely in place, and in 1992, the place was co-opted by the Tonopah Historic Mining Park Foundation as a preservation site for the Tonopah mining history.

== Collection ==
Tonopah Historic Mining Park contains four mining sites, with many of the original equipment showcased as part of their permanent exhibits. It also provides several historical records in the form of photographs and audiovisual presentations. Many of the architectural structures in the site were originally used by the miners during the era.

== See also ==
- Central Nevada Museum
- Beatty Museum
- List of museums in Nevada
