= Midas Schoolhouse =

- U.S. National Register of Historic Places
- Location within Nevada Location within the United States
- Location: Second St., two blocks east of Main St., Midas, Nevada
- Coordinates: 41°14′32″N 116°47′39″W
- Area: 0.5 acres (0.20 ha)
- Built: 1927-28
- Architectural style: Bungalow/craftsman
- NRHP reference No.: 04000727
- Added to NRHP: July 21, 2004

The Midas Schoolhouse, located on Second St., two blocks east of Main St., in Midas, Nevada, was a historic schoolhouse that was built in 1928. It is listed on the National Register of Historic Places (NRHP).

The building was destroyed by a fire in 2005.

Its NRHP nomination argued that the building is significant "for its association with the educational and social history of the remote, early-twentieth-century mining town." It includes Craftsman architecture. It has a cross-gabled roof that once had wood shakes, now is covered by regular composition shingles; its exterior is horizontal wooden shiplap. It is a small building, and has two original outhouses at the back; the school and both of those were deemed contributing buildings in the NRHP listing. In 2004, building was serving as a community meeting room and as a museum.

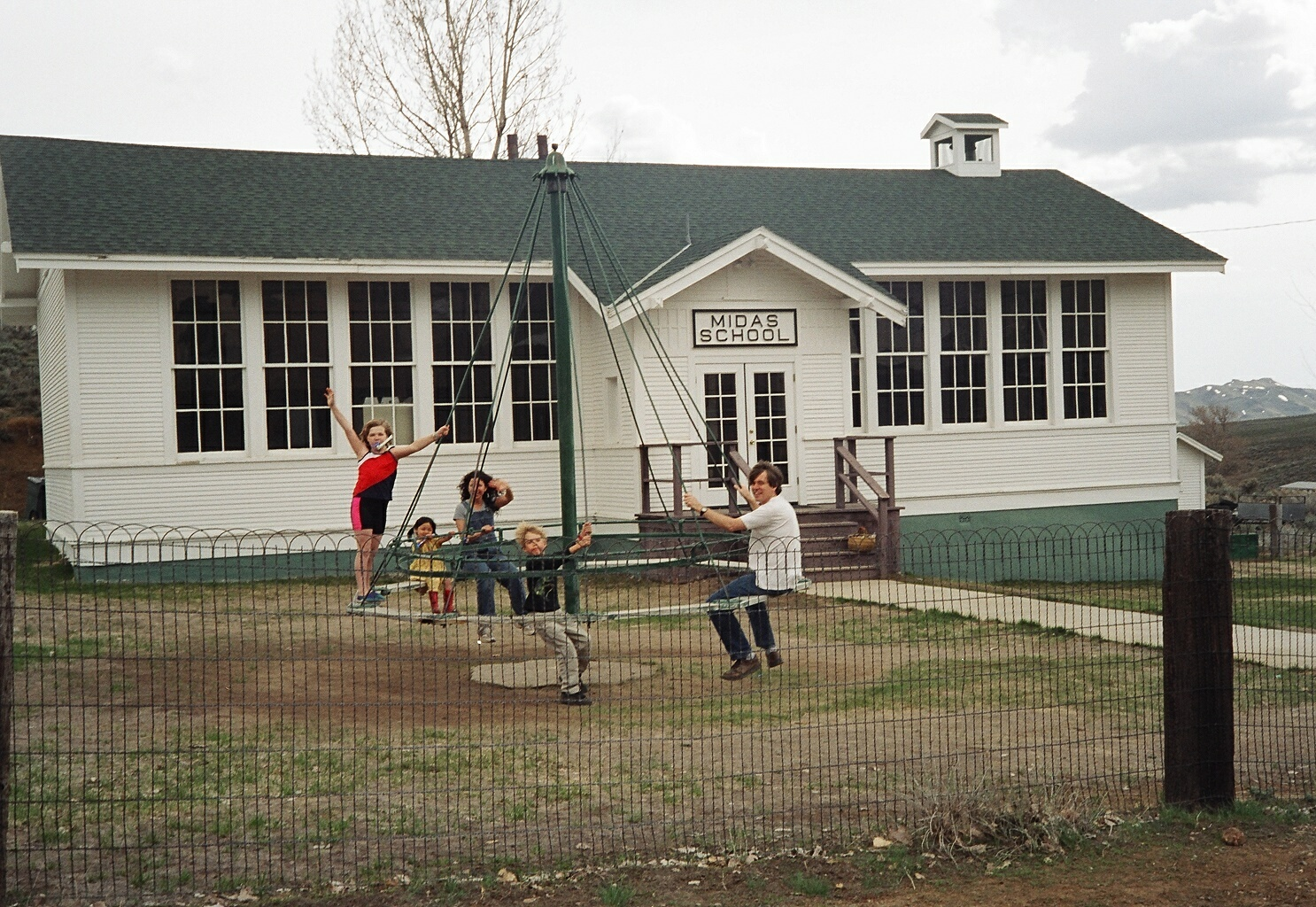
Midas Schoolhouse in 2004

It was listed on the National Register in 2004.
