= Sunken Gardens (Florida) =

- Sanitary Public Market
- U.S. National Register of Historic Places
- Location within Florida Location within the United States
- Location: St. Petersburg, Florida
- Coordinates: 27°47′24″N 82°38′18″W
- Architectural style: Mission/Spanish Revival
- Website: SunkenGardens.org
- NRHP reference No.: 02000680
- Added to NRHP: June 27, 2002

The Sunken Gardens are 4 acres (1.6 ha) of well-established botanical gardens, located in the Historic Old Northeast neighborhood of St. Petersburg, Florida, at 1825 4th Street North. The Gardens have existed for more than a century, and are one of the oldest roadside tourist attractions in the United States. The Gardens are now operated by the City of St. Petersburg, and maintained with the help of volunteers. Sunken Gardens are open to the public every day of the week. An admission fee is charged for entrance into the gardens and a yearly membership is also available.

Sunken Gardens retains their historical interest as an important example of a 1930s Florida roadside commercial attraction, and is probably the oldest commercial tourist attraction on Florida's west coast. The Gardens are open to the public for educational programs, tours, and special events, particularly weddings which have taken place for decades on the Wedding Lawn, and in the banquet facilities in the Garden Room overlooking the unique garden setting.

== History ==
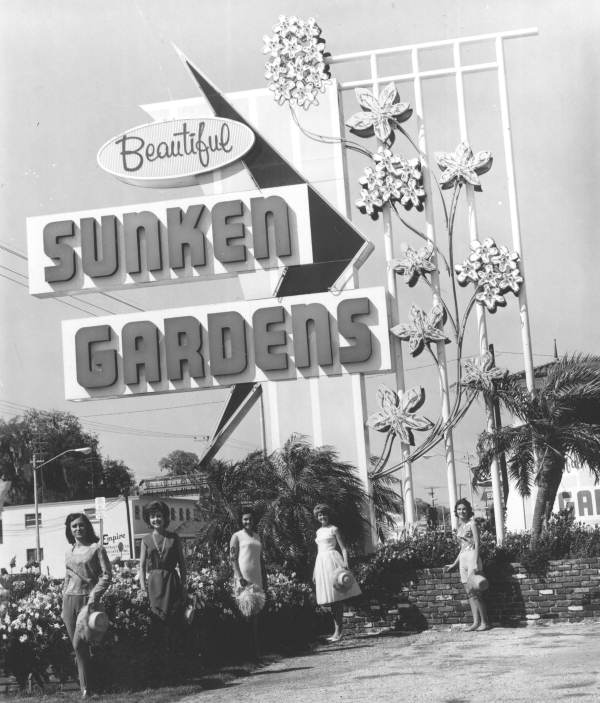

The Gardens began in 1903, when plumber and avid gardener George Turner Sr. (1881-1961) purchased six acres of land, including a shallow lake 10 feet (3.0 m) below sea level, which he drained to form his private "sunken" garden. Turner started planting papayas and citrus fruits along with other exotic plants on the rich soil surrounding his home.

By the 1920s, Turner had opened a nursery and began selling fruits, vegetables, and other plants, and visitors were paying a nickel each to stroll through the gardens. In the fall of 1935, he fenced his garden and started charging an admission fee of 24 cents. The Gardens eventually became widely popular, and from the 1950s through the 1970s were ranked among Florida's top ten commercial attractions. After Turner's death in 1961, his sons Ralph and George Jr. continued to run the gardens, which were eventually passed on to Ralph's three sons. They eventually sold it to the city in 1999 for more than $2.26 million.

== Historic building status ==
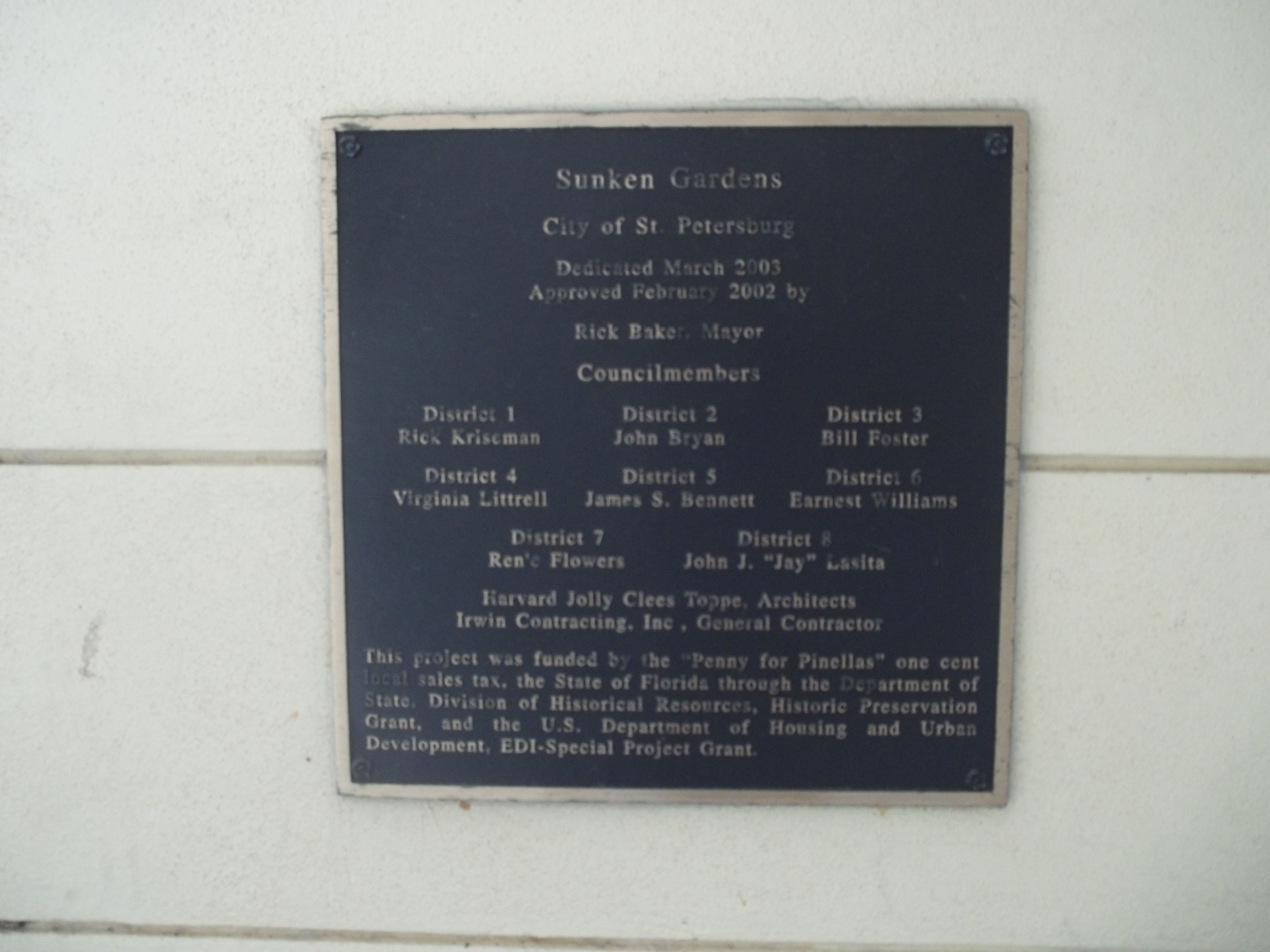

The Gardens include a large building originally known as the Sanitary Public Market, first constructed in 1926–27, and designed by architect Albert Lee Hawes. It was a Mediterranean Revival style arcade with twin Moorish towers, cast stone trim, and a tile roof. In 1940, it was converted for use as the Coca-Cola Bottling Company, and restyled in Art Moderne. The Turner family purchased the building in 1967 to create the World's Largest Gift Shop and the King of Kings Wax Museum, adding faux lava portions at that time.

In 1999, it was purchased by the City of St. Petersburg, along with the adjoining gardens, using a voter-approved tax. The Gardens were designated as a local historic landmark and treated to several years' efforts of restoration. On June 27, 2002, the former Sanitary Public Market building was added to the U.S. National Register of Historic Places, and is now the home of Great Explorations Children's Museum.

== Flora and fauna ==
The Gardens currently contain over 500 species of tropical and subtropical plants amidst pools and cascading waterfalls, lushly planted in a collection of more than 50,000 tropical plants and flowers. They include a Japanese garden, cactus garden, and butterfly garden, and Chilean flamingos. Plants include bougainvilleas, royal palms, water lilies, shrimp plants, and fruit trees. The garden atmosphere is peaceful and many of the plants are quite large (compared to typical specimens) due to their long history of protection and cultivation.

=== Chilean flamingos ===
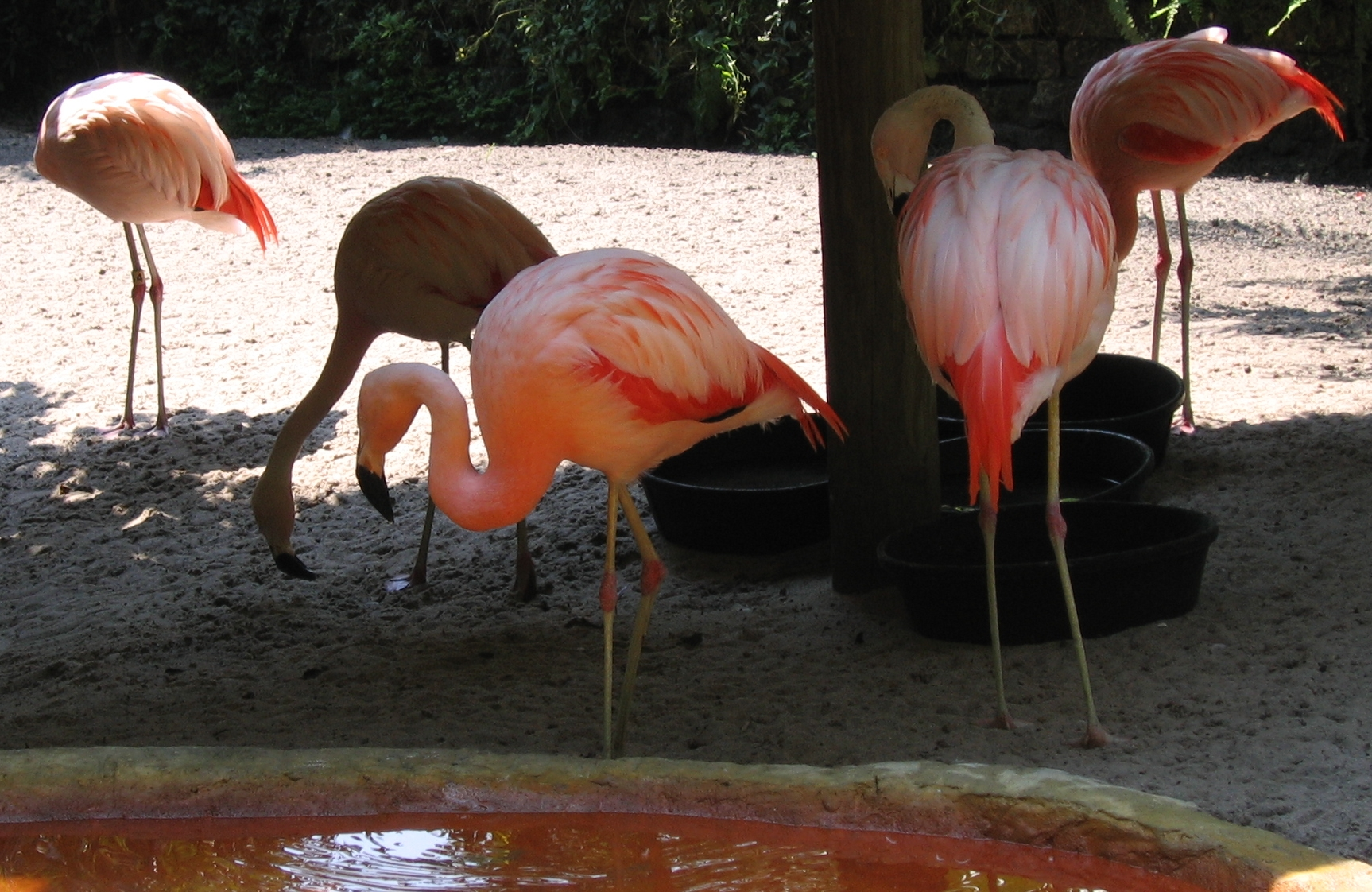
Chilean flamingos (Phoenicopterus chilensis)

In 2016, Sunken Gardens acquired a new young flock of 20 flamingos from the San Antonio Zoo. They joined elderly flamingo residents, George and Lucy, the two remaining Chilean flamingos from the original 17 bird flock that have been on exhibit since 1956. The new flamingos were purchased with funds raised by a nonprofit group, Flamingos Forever, composed of volunteers. Additionally, the city purchased a $30,000 nighttime enclosure for the new flock. Flamingos Forever changed their name to Sunken Gardens Forever, after the acquisition of the new flock, and St. Petersburg Mayor Rick Kriseman named May "Sunken Gardens Forever Appreciation Month" in honor of their fundraising efforts.

=== Parrots ===
Sunken Gardens also houses 11 parrots. Five macaws, four Amazons, and two cockatoos live in the garden. Additionally, a kookaburra also resides on the premises. All twelve of the birds are rescues and were acquired after their previous owners died or could no longer provide care for them. Bobbie Sue is a yellow-headed amazon who is over 30 years old. There is Mindy, who is a white umbrella cockatoo that's around 30. Coconut, a 20-year-old macaw, was one of the more recent birds acquired by the gardens. There is also Mitch, an 8-year-old Major Mitchell's cockatoo. In recent years, staff stated that Mitch has become agreeable and will occasionally play “peekaboo” with staff or visitors.

== Programs for lifelong learning ==
Sunken Gardens offers horticulture and other education programs for children and adults. Examples include "Cameras and Kids" where children learn nature photography skills with their own camera or smartphone, "Propagation Techniques," "Growing Microgreens," "Rain Gardens and Barrels," and "Think Outside the Pot: Mounting Orchids". Programs are often free with membership and are included with paid admission, though some include a fee in addition to standard admission.

== Community offerings ==
Sunken Gardens offers garden tours, horticultural programs, and special events to residents of the community and visitors. Groups visits are allowed as self-guided visits and docent-led tours. The gardens also allow for event rentals of weddings, private parties, seminars, luncheons, retreats, and receptions. Since 1935, Sunken Gardens has allowed weddings on the property.

== Sophie & Zack at Sunken Gardens ==
Sophie & Zack at Sunken Gardens is a children's book made by Sunken Gardens Forever Foundation, Pop Design Group, and a local illustrator. The book includes images and information about the history, plants, and animals at Sunken Gardens. The book was completed as part of an educational partnership with Pinellas County School System.

After the book was completed, Sophie & Zack at Sunken Gardens developed into a project to allow local students to learn about the gardens and visit them. An estimated 1,600 third graders attending 19 local Title-1 schools were initially expected to benefit from this project. Benefits include a story-time of the book by a Sunken Gardens Forever Foundation volunteer at school, each student receiving a copy of Sophie & Zack at Sunken Gardens to take home for free, and then a field trip for the students to visit the gardens. The Sunken Gardens Forever Foundation fully funds the entire project.

== Accessibility ==
The majority of historic paths within the garden are ADA accessible. These paths span three-fourths of a mile. Wheelchairs and walkers are allowed within the gardens but not provided. Some of the paths have a steep incline, but alternate routes are available to access all areas of the gardens. There is also limited seating available throughout the gardens. Only ADA service trained dogs are allowed within Sunken Gardens.

== Gallery ==
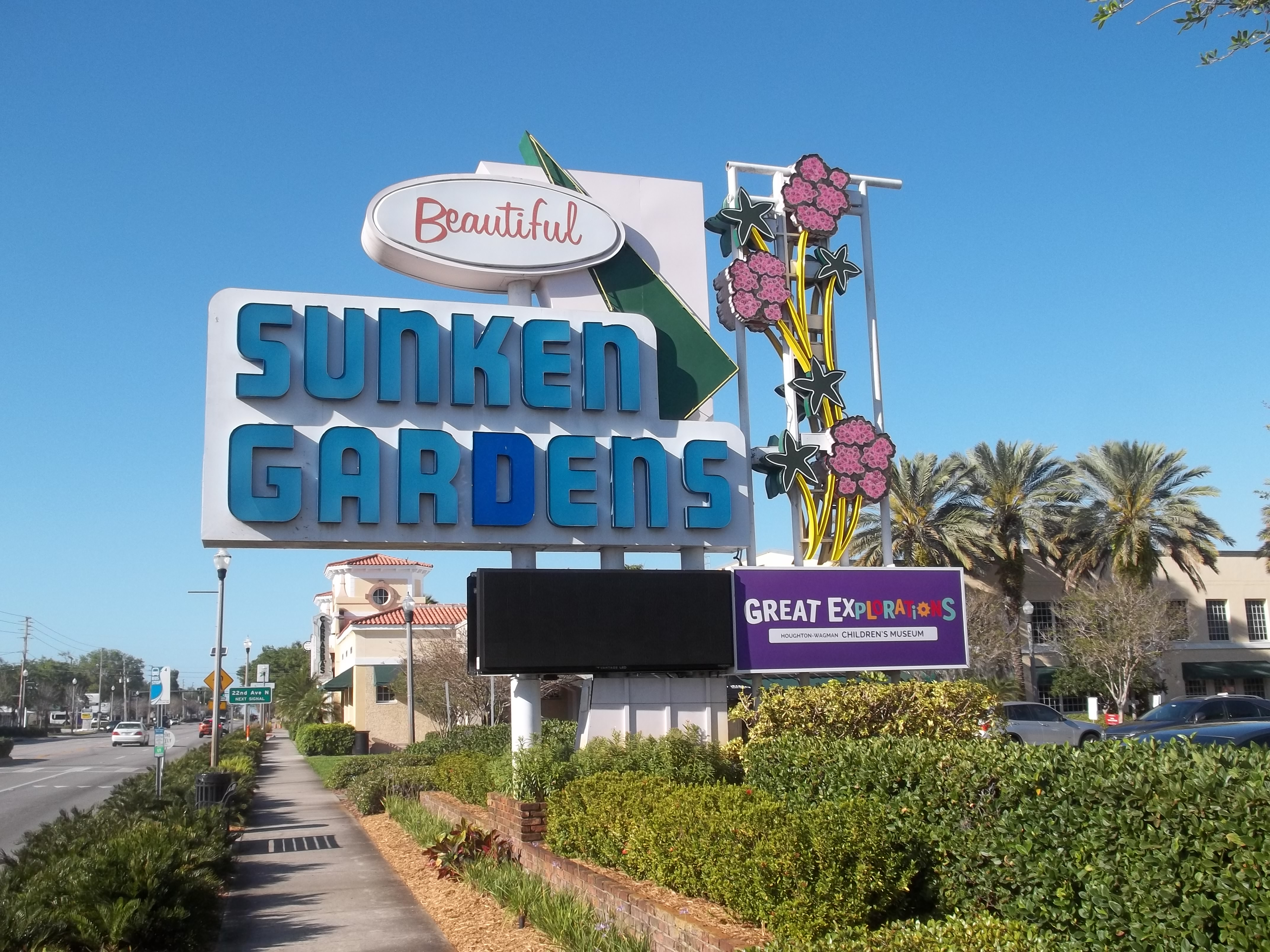
Sunken Gardens sign

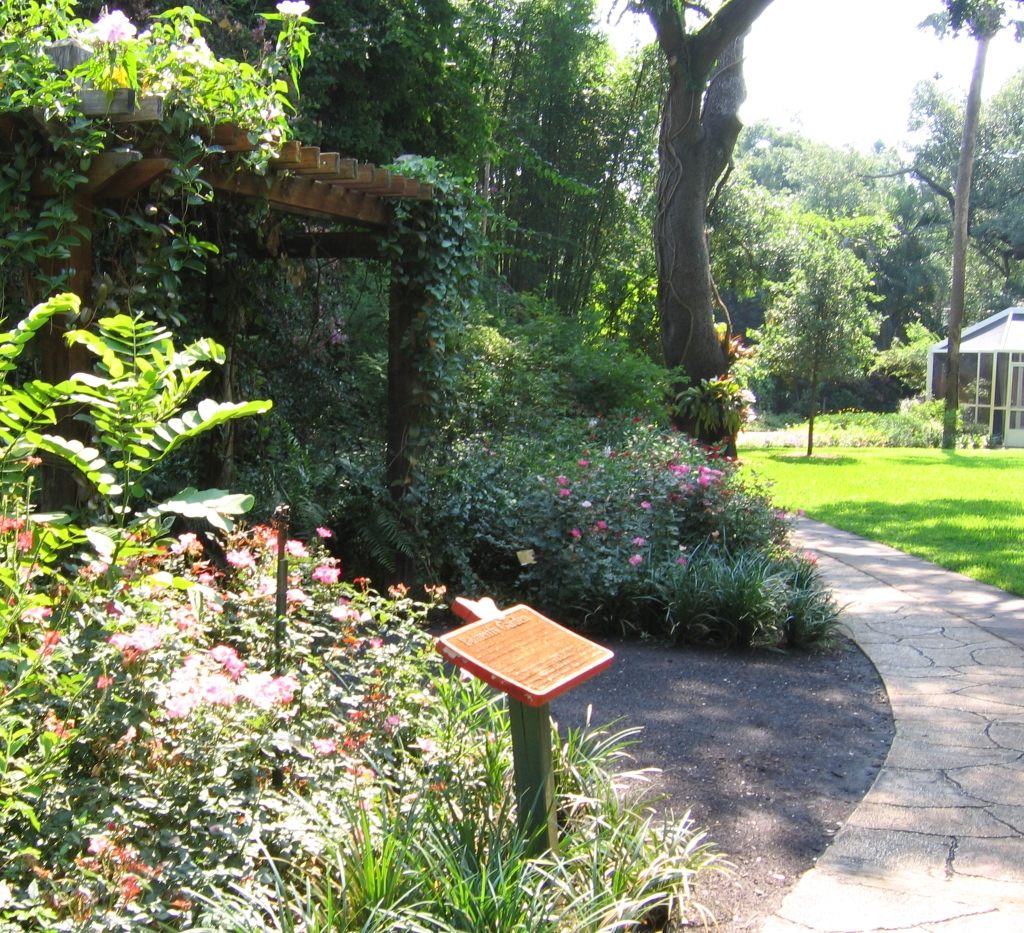
Butterfly Garden

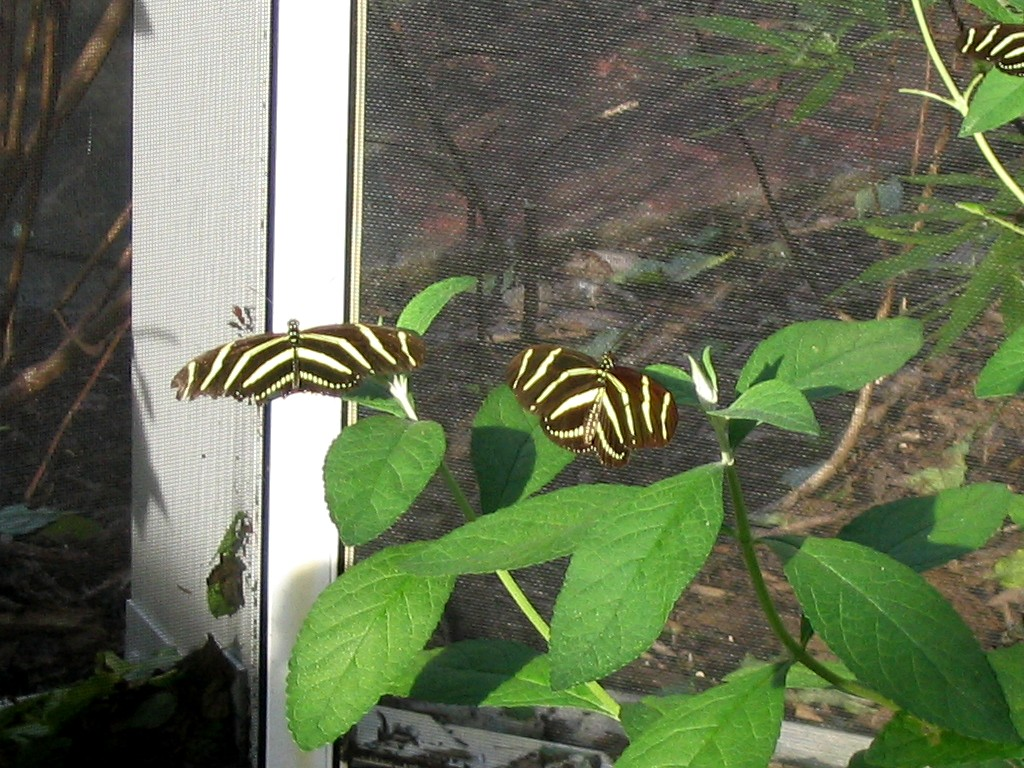
State butterfly, Zebra longwing

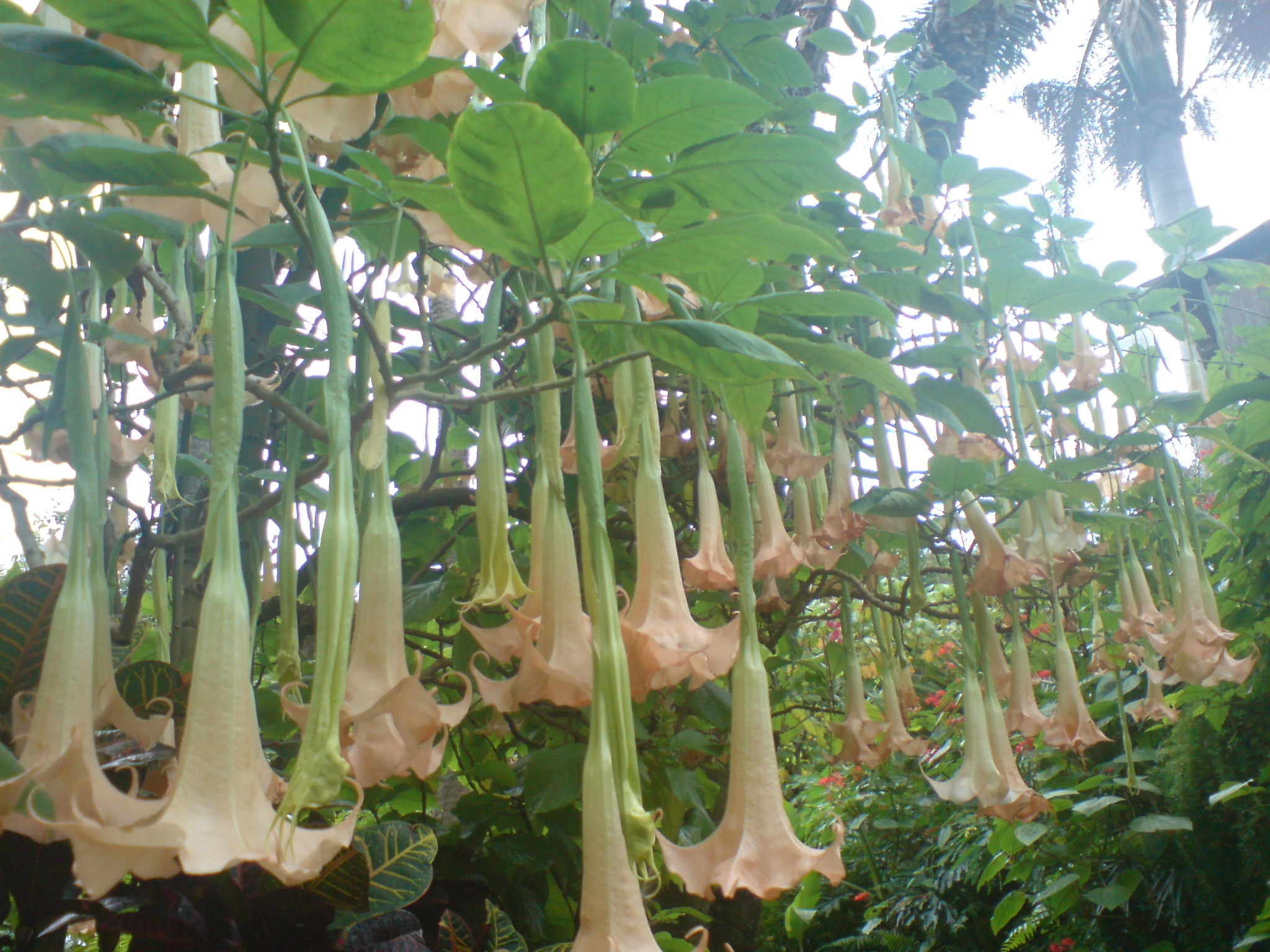

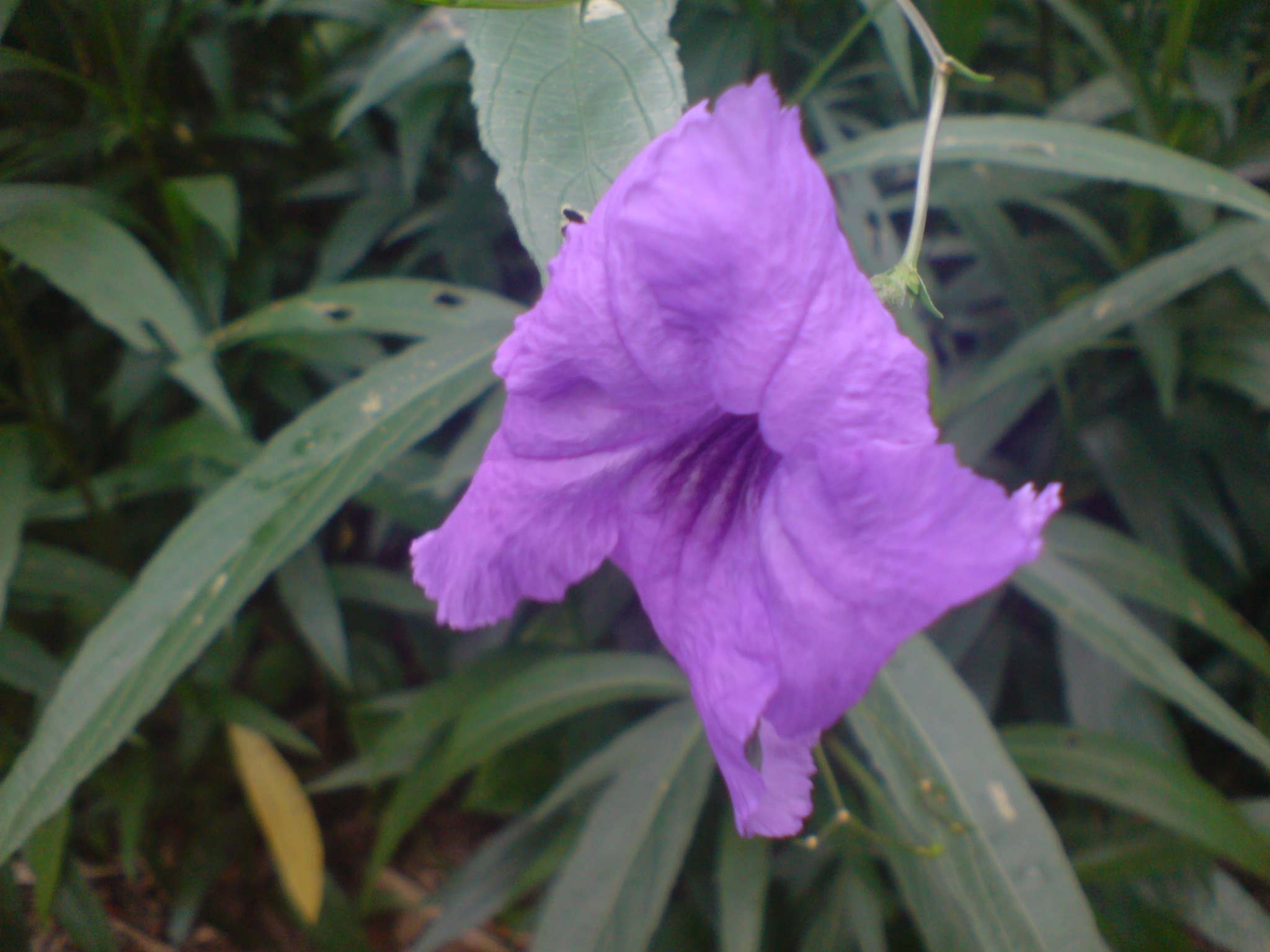

== See also ==
- List of botanical gardens and arboretums in Florida
- List of botanical gardens in the United States
