= McGill Historical Drug Store Museum =

- McGill Drug Store
- U.S. National Register of Historic Places
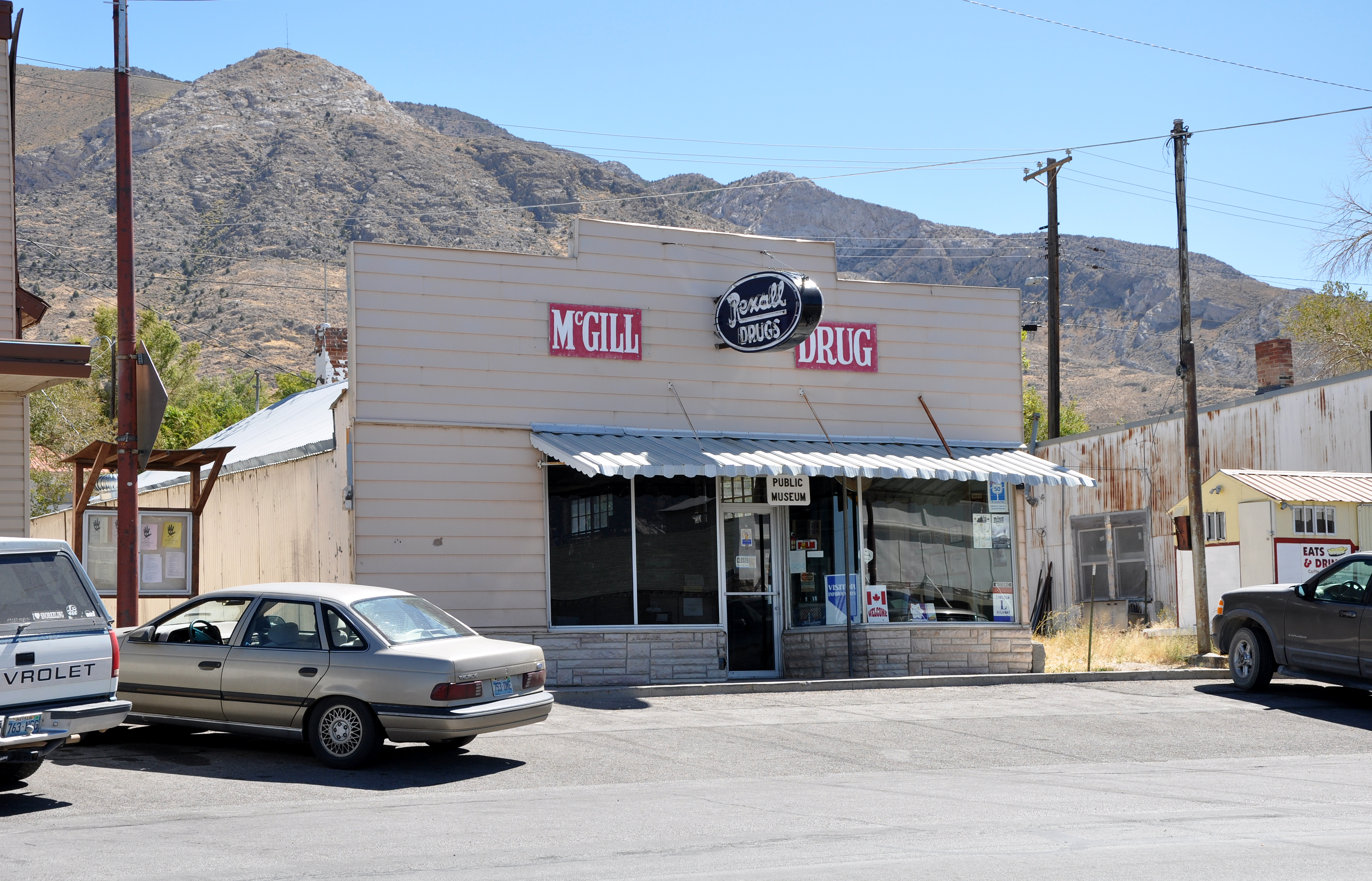
- McGill Drug Store in 2010

- Location within Nevada Location within the United States
- Location: 11 4th St., McGill, Nevada
- Coordinates: 39°24′17″N 114°46′40″W
- Built: 1909
- Architect: Nevada Consolidated Copper Company
- NRHP reference No.: 97001301
- Added to NRHP: August 17, 1998

The McGill Drug Store Museum is a former drug store in McGill, Nevada. It operated from 1915 to 1979. The store closed when the nearby Kennecott Copper mine closed down, with its entire inventory intact, including prescription medication. It has been re-opened as a museum with more than 30,000 items as well as prescription records extending back to 1915. The museum is a resource for investigators of retailing and historical pharmacy practices.

== History ==
The museum was originally a drug store owned by the McGill Drug Company, who may have acquired the structure from another business, Steptoe Drug Company. Although the place primarily serves as a drugstore and pharmacy, it is also notable for its soda fountain, which remains in existence until now.

The drug store became a museum in 1995, when the White Pine County bought the building from Elsa Culbert, who continued to operate the drug store and soda fountain with her husband, Gerald, and became the owners of the business starting from the 1940s. The drugstore stopped operating in 1979, when Gerald died, and many of the remaining items there were left as they were.

== Collection ==
The museum is a time-capsule filled with relics throughout the 1940s to 1970s, including pharmaceutical products and medical equipment. It also retains many interior and exterior qualities dated to certain eras, from steel-based structures common in use during the mining era boom, to 1930-style soda counters.

== See also ==
- List of museums in Nevada
