= Beatty Museum =

Coordinates: 36.915°N 116.759°W

Beatty Museum and Historical Society
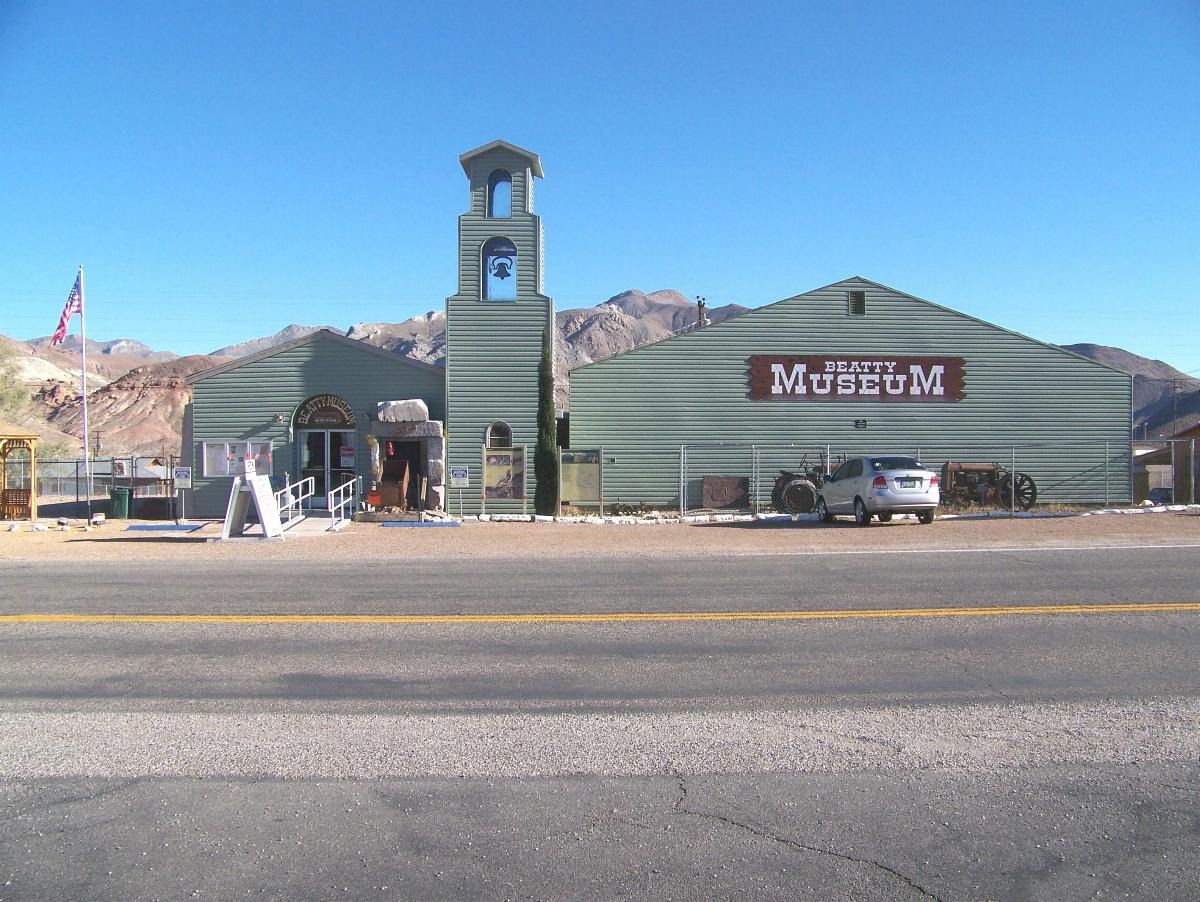

- 417 Main St, Beatty, NV 89003, United States
- Established: May 1995
- Location: Beatty, Nevada, United States
- Type: History museum
- Visitors: 35,000 per year
- Founders: Claudia Reidhead, Vonnie Gray, and Mary Revert
- Website: www.beattymuseum.org

Beatty Museum, also known as Beatty Museum and Historical Society, is a volunteer-run local history museum in Beatty, Nevada that showcases the history of the Bullfrog mining district (Rhyolite, Bullfrog, Gold Center, Transvaal, and Springdale), including its townspeople and their way of life. The museum was founded in 1995 and has experienced several changes in location since its founding.

== History ==
Beatty Museum was founded by three women, Claudia Reidhead, Vonnie Gray, and Mary Revert, who wanted to preserve Beatty’s history as an ex-mining district. At first, it operated from a cottage owned by Reidhead until the museum moved to a nearby building that was previously used by the local water department in 1996 due to the increasing number of collection it holds. However this building quickly no longer suffices as the museum collection expanded, and they moved again until finally settling in a building that used to be a church before the museum purchased it from the Roman Catholic Diocese of Las Vegas.

== Collection ==
The museum provides a number of exhibitions ranging from original items dated from the era, such as furniture, clothing, and household items, to equipment used by miners who worked in the Bullfrog district. It also keeps historical photographs, diaries, and letters of Beatty’s townspeople and area.

Aside from its focus on exhibiting items from the Bullfrog mining era, Beatty Museum also showcases Native American artifacts from the Shoshone, whose tribe members settled in Beatty.

== See also ==
- Beatty, Nevada
- List of museums in Nevada
- Mining community
