= Pensacola MESS Hall =

Science museum in Pensacola, Florida

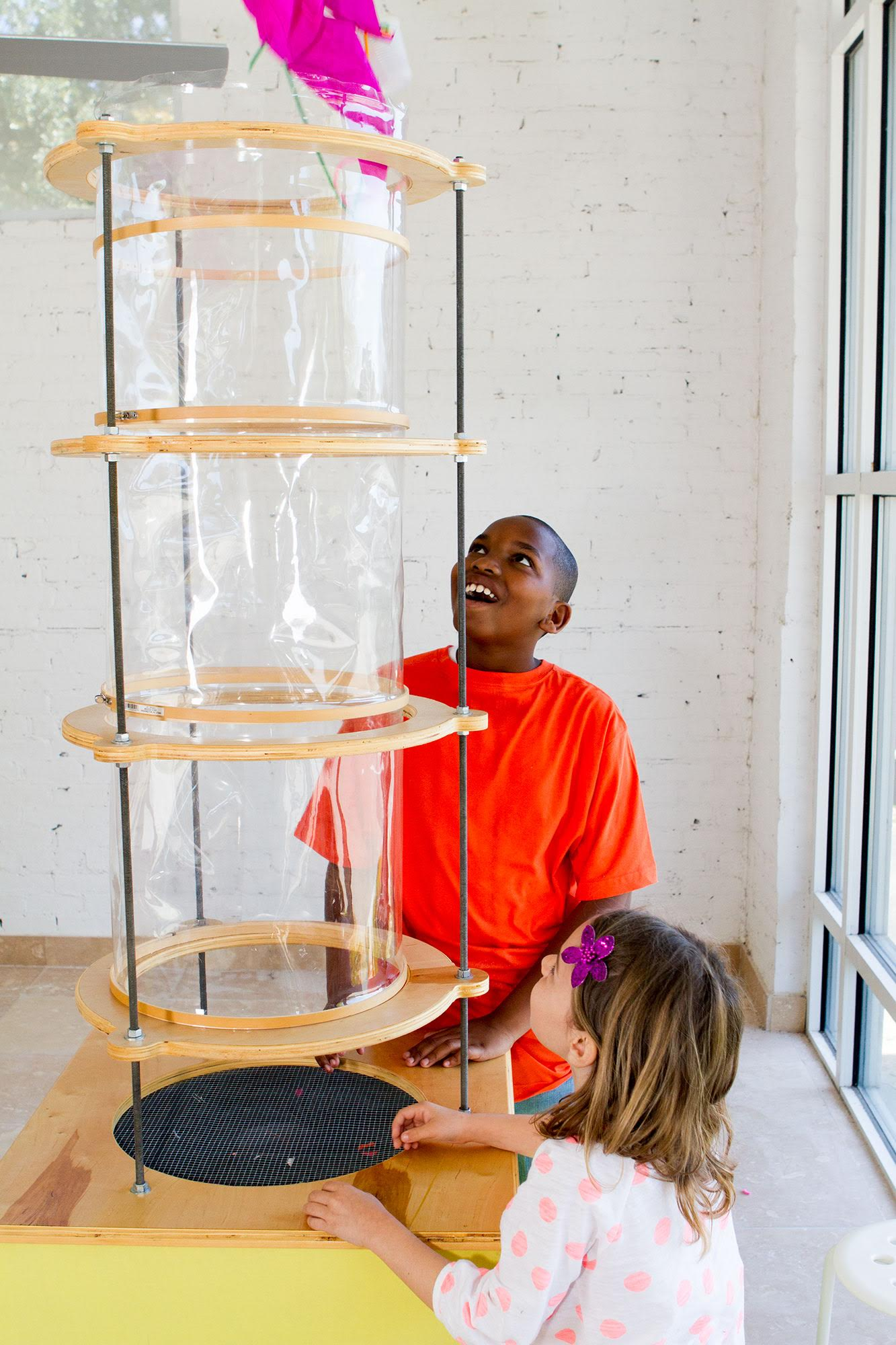

- Map of Florida
- Established: 2012
- Location: Pensacola, Florida
- Coordinates: 30.4154794°N 87.2125962°W
- Website: www.pensacolamesshall.org

The Pensacola MESS Hall is a hands on science museum located in downtown Pensacola, Florida founded in 2012 by Megan Pratt and Jerry Pratt.

The museum has mess kits and individual science activities with all of the materials needed to explore a concept.

In addition, the MESS Hall has classes and camps. The camps have been awarded the Pensacola News Journal's Best of the Bay award in 2016. Throughout the year, though primarily in the summer, the MESS Hall also holds a variety of workshops to delve deeper into science topics, from fossils to kitchen chemistry.

In 2014 the MESS Hall received an Impact 100 of Pensacola to fund the creation of an outreach program called MESS Hall Express. During 2016, these outreach programs were augmented by two grants. One, supported by Disney through a Creativity Garden grant, a nationwide project of the Association of Science-Technology Centers, brought the MESS Hall to a local school for Tinker-Explore-Create workshops five times during the school year. The other, funded through GlaxoSmithKline, brought Science in the Summer to local libraries and community centers

The MESS Hall is a 501(c)3 not-for-profit and relies on charitable contributions to cover some portion of its operating expenses. To increase support, the MESS Hall holds an annual MESS Hall Goes Gourmet gala fundraiser, supported in a large part by Gulf Power
