= Las Vegas Historical Society =

Photograph preservation organization created in 2013

Coordinates: 36.158083°N 115.153777°W

The Las Vegas Historical Society was created in 2013 to collect, archive, and display photographs of Las Vegas and the Las Vegas Valley in Nevada, which have not yet been publicly showcased.

== Online ==
The Society's website has an online photo archive organized by decade. The website also allows for local Las Vegans and the city's visitors to upload their historical photographs.

== Museum ==
The Society is located in the Las Vegas Arts District in Downtown Las Vegas. It is open daily for viewing of select photos, put in chronological order by decades to create a timeline for the history of Las Vegas and the Las Vegas Valley in Clark County.

== See also ==
- History of Las Vegas
