= Central Nevada Museum =

- 1900 Logan Field Road Tonopah, Nevada 89049
- Established: 1981
- Location: Tonopah, Nevada, United States
- Coordinates: 38.060°N 117.220°W
- Type: History museum
- Founder: Central Nevada Historical Society
- Website: www.centralnevadamuseum.com

Central Nevada Museum is a non-profit local history museum in Tonopah, Nevada. The museum focuses on the preservation of historical records and artifacts of several counties in Nevada, namely Nye and Esmeralda, as well as several mining towns such as Belmont, Gilbert, and Weepah. It was founded in 1981 by the Central Nevada Historical Society with the help of a grant from the Fleischmann Foundation.

== History ==
The idea for the museum came from several locals who ended up founding the Central Nevada Historical Society, who initially started the museum to focus on preserving the local history of mining towns in the area, including in Tonopah itself. Tonopah used to be well-known in the early 1900s for its silver, gold, and copper mines, though by the time World War II ended, many of the companies that operated in Tonopah, such as The Tonopah Mining Company, chose to leave the town.

Although the museum was initially started to focus on Tonopah’s mining history, it eventually expanded its exhibition to include several other historical objects, such as ones dating back to World War II, when Tonopah Army Airfield (now known as Tonopah Air Force Base) was in operation.

== Collection ==
Central Nevada Museum houses a number of exhibitions in addition to its historical research archives. Their outdoor exhibition, in the form of an old west town, contains replicas as well as original exteriors used during the era – and included a saloon and miners’ cabin. The museum also hosts a permanent indoor exhibit that also contains several Native American relics, in addition to displays from the mining boom era and Tonopah’s military base.

== See also ==
- Tonopah, Nevada
- List of museums in Nevada
- Tonopah Air Force Base
