= Elvis-A-Rama Museum =

Museum in Nevada, United states of America

Coordinates: 36.1280°N 115.1759°W

The Elvis-A-Rama Museum in Paradise, Nevada was a large private collection of Elvis memorabilia owned by Chris Davidson which featured an 85-foot-long (26 m) mural about Elvis' life and career. The museum opened on November 5, 1999, and showcased more than $5,000,000 worth of Elvis' vehicles, jumpsuits, guitars and other memorabilia. The museum was housed in an 8,200 sq ft (760 m^{2}) building that contained the museum, 100 person showroom and extensive gift shop. All the showcases of Elvis's belongings were enhanced with murals by renowned artist Robert Emerald Shappy. Over thirty paintings were created by Shappy for both the museums in Nevada. The artwork was valued by Davidson at $250,000. A break-in occurred at the museum on March 17, 2004, with almost $300,000 worth of memorabilia stolen including Elvis' jewelry and a .38 special handgun. The stolen items were recovered on November 3, 2005, with the assistance of Duke Adams, an Elvis impersonator who was approached by Eliab Aguilar, who was subsequently arrested by Las Vegas Metro for the robbery. The museum was located at 3401 Industrial Road.

Elvis Presley Enterprises, Inc acquired the assets and trademark to the museum and closed it on October 1, 2006, to make way for a world class Elvis attraction on the Las Vegas strip. CKX, Inc. granted Mr. Davidson the right to open a museum in Hawaii. Neither place has opened yet.

== See also ==
- List of music museums
