= McGill, Nevada =

- CDP
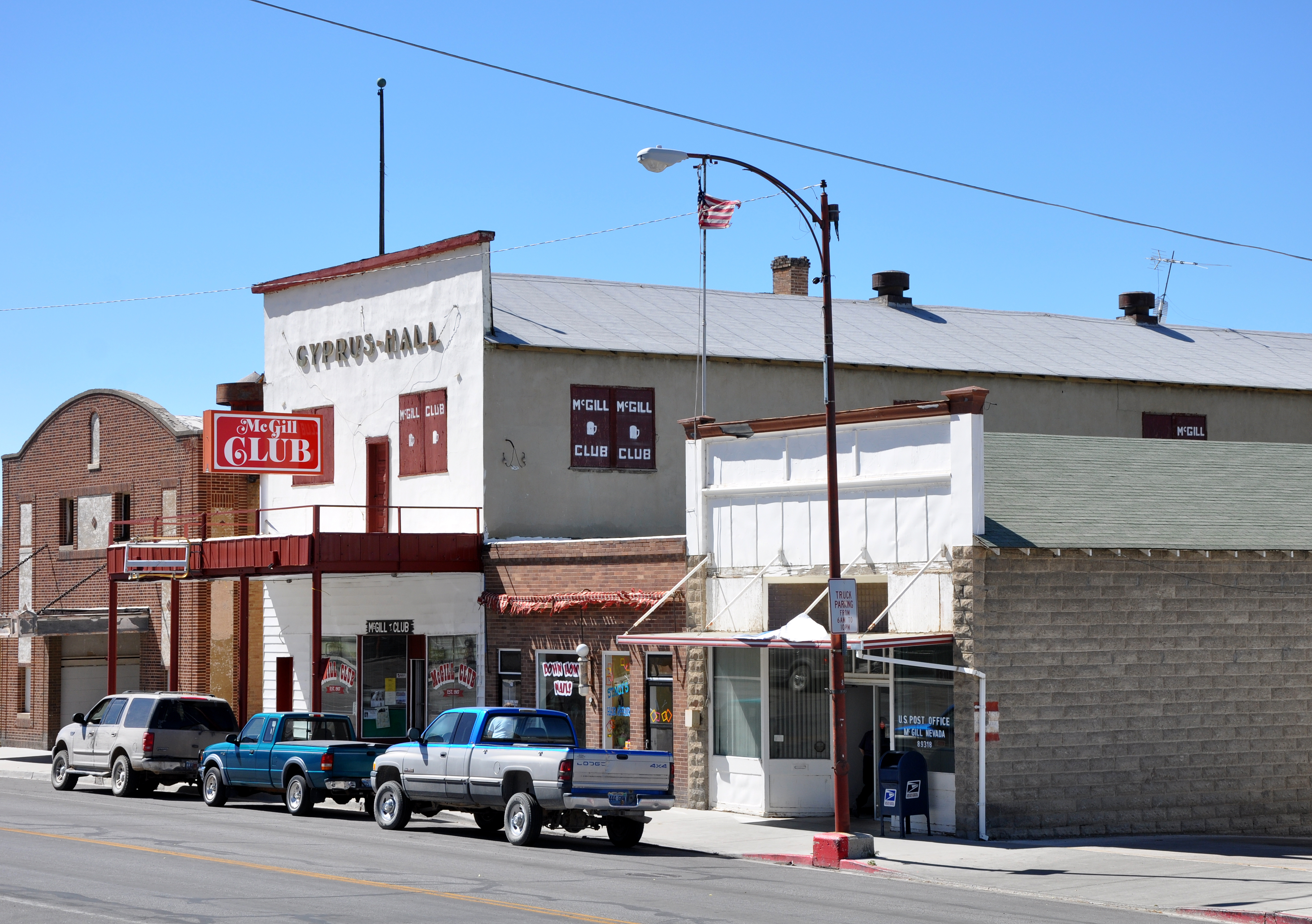
- Downtown McGill

- Location of McGill, Nevada
- Coordinates: 39°24′07″N 114°46′39″W
- Country: United States
- State: Nevada

Area
  - Total: 1.21 sq mi (3.13 km^{2})
  - Land: 1.21 sq mi (3.13 km^{2})
  - Water: 0 sq mi (0.00 km^{2})
- Elevation: 6,247 ft (1,904 m)

Population (2020)
  - Total: 1,010
  - Density: 835/sq mi (322.3/km^{2})
- Time zone: UTC-8 (Pacific (PST))
  - Summer (DST): UTC-7 (PDT)
- ZIP code: 89318
- Area code: 775
- FIPS code: 32-44200
- GNIS feature ID: 2408199

McGill is a census-designated place (CDP) in White Pine County, Nevada, United States. As of the 2020 census, McGill had a population of 1,010.

== History ==
In 1872, John Cowger established a ranch in the Steptoe Valley and acquired the water rights for the area. William Lyons and William McGill purchased the ranch in 1886. A post office was established at the ranch, now named McGill Ranch, in 1891.

The Nevada Consolidated Copper Company had numerous mines in the region and was seeking a partner to create a smelter in the area. The Cumberland and Ely Mining Corporation had acquired 8 square miles (21 km^{2}) of land near the ranch and thought it would be ideal for a smelter location due to access to a plentiful water source. The two companies formed a partnership, the Steptoe Valley Smelting and Mining Company.

In 1906, a 9-mile (14 km) pipeline was built to bring water from Duck Creek to reservoirs near the smelter site and construction began on the smelter. The smelter was completed and operations began on May 15, 1908. The first copper was shipped from the smelter on August 7 of the same year.

The town was briefly known as Smelter, before being renamed McGill, after the ranch. The population of the town grew from its inception to 1,904 in 1910 and 2,864 in 1920.

Kennecott Utah Copper acquired Nevada Consolidated Copper Company, which included Steptoe Valley Smelting and Mining Company and the smelter at McGill in 1932. Up until the 1950s, McGill was a company town, owned by Kennecott. In the 1950s Kennecott started selling McGill's homes and businesses to individuals. In 1983, the price of copper along with the low-grade ore being mined led to Kennecott closing the smelter and demolishing it. With the primary employer gone, the population of McGill decreased to its current levels.

== Geography ==
According to the United States Census Bureau, the CDP has a total area of 1.1 square miles (2.8 km^{2}), all of it land.

== Demographics ==
Historical population
Census	Pop.	Note	%±
1980	1,419		—
1990	1,258		−11.3%
2000	1,054		−16.2%
2010	1,148		8.9%
2020	1,010		−12.0%
U.S. Decennial Census

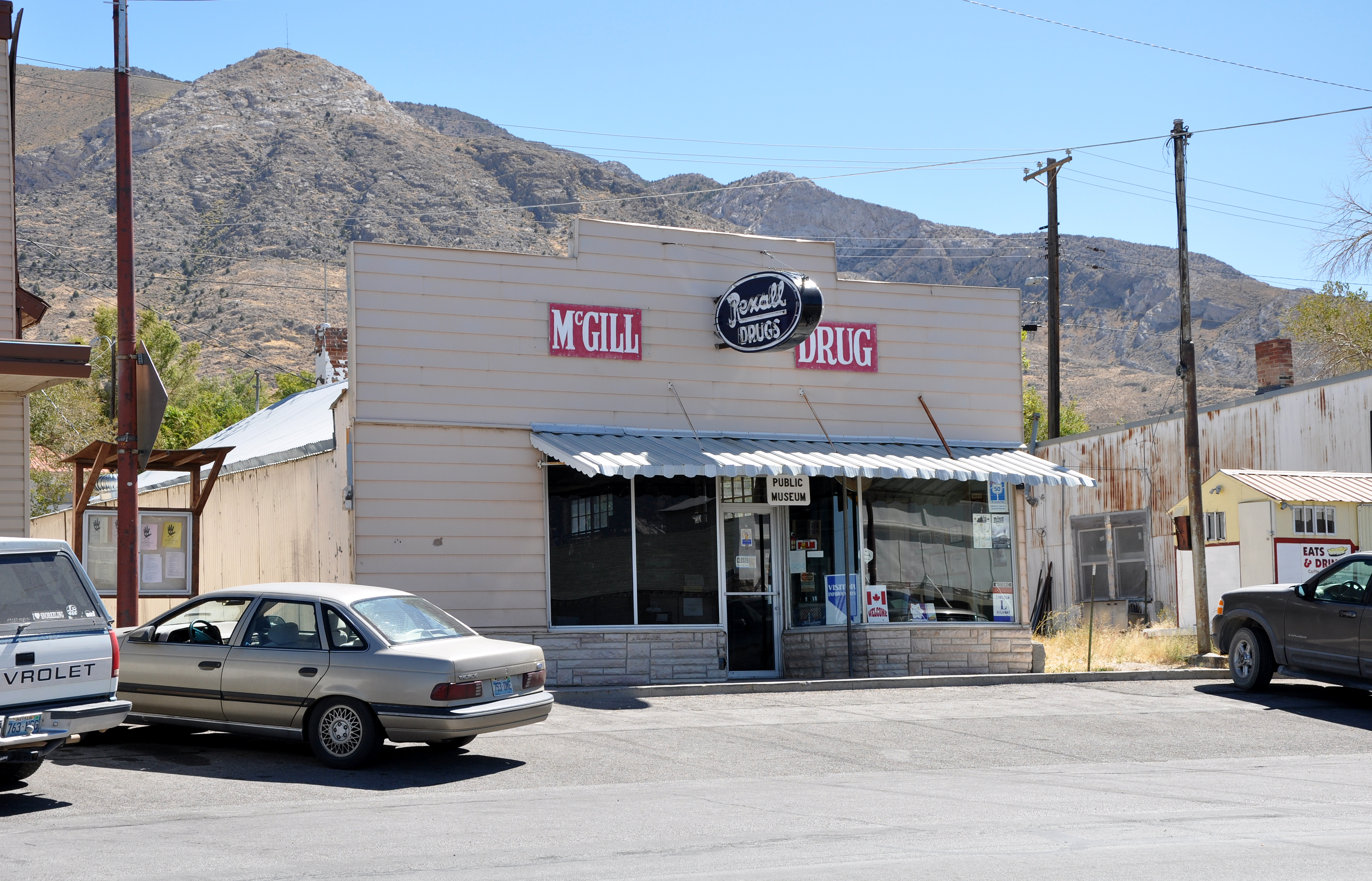
The McGill Drug Store Museum is listed on the National Register of Historic Places.

At the 2000 census, there were 1,054 people, 448 households, and 305 families residing in the CDP. The population density was 953.9 inhabitants per square mile (368.3/km^{2}). There were 599 housing units at an average density of 542.1 per square mile (209.3/km^{2}). The racial makeup of the CDP was 91.72% White, 2.75% Native American, 2.3% Croatian, 0.19% Asian, 0.09% Pacific Islander, 1.80% from other races, and 1.14% from two or more races. Hispanic or Latino of any race were 6.74% of the population.

There were 448 households, of which 26.6% had children under the age of 18 living with them, 54.9% were married couples living together, 8.5% had a female householder with no husband present, and 31.7% were non-families. 27.9% of all households were made up of individuals, and 14.1% had someone living alone who was 65 years of age or older. The average household size was 2.35 and the average family size was 2.89.

24.7% of the population were under the age of 18, 6.4% from 18 to 24, 22.8% from 25 to 44, 25.0% from 45 to 64, and 21.2% who were 65 years of age or older. The median age was 43 years. For every 100 females, there were 97.7 males. For every 100 females age 18 and over, there were 97.5 males.

The median household income was $32,039, and the median family income was $42,679. Males had a median income of $36,149 compared with $19,813 for females. The per capita income for the CDP was $15,643. About 11.0% of families and 10.5% of the population were below the poverty line, including 13.0% of those under age 18 and none of those age 65 or over.

== Climate ==
Climate data for McGill, Nevada (1991–2020 normals, extremes 1892–present)
Month	Jan	Feb	Mar	Apr	May	Jun	Jul	Aug	Sep	Oct	Nov	Dec	Year
Record high °F (°C)	66 (19)	70 (21)	84 (29)	89 (32)	96 (36)	100 (38)	104 (40)	100 (38)	97 (36)	92 (33)	78 (26)	68 (20)	104 (40)
Mean maximum °F (°C)	54.6 (12.6)	57.8 (14.3)	67.3 (19.6)	75.0 (23.9)	83.2 (28.4)	90.7 (32.6)	95.6 (35.3)	92.9 (33.8)	87.6 (30.9)	78.9 (26.1)	67.2 (19.6)	56.9 (13.8)	96.1 (35.6)
Mean daily maximum °F (°C)	41.2 (5.1)	44.2 (6.8)	52.8 (11.6)	59.1 (15.1)	68.5 (20.3)	80.3 (26.8)	88.3 (31.3)	86.9 (30.5)	77.8 (25.4)	65.0 (18.3)	51.1 (10.6)	41.3 (5.2)	63.0 (17.2)
Daily mean °F (°C)	28.0 (−2.2)	30.9 (−0.6)	38.6 (3.7)	44.6 (7.0)	53.0 (11.7)	63.0 (17.2)	71.0 (21.7)	69.8 (21.0)	60.2 (15.7)	48.1 (8.9)	36.7 (2.6)	27.7 (−2.4)	47.6 (8.7)
Mean daily minimum °F (°C)	14.9 (−9.5)	17.6 (−8.0)	24.4 (−4.2)	30.2 (−1.0)	37.5 (3.1)	45.8 (7.7)	53.6 (12.0)	52.7 (11.5)	42.7 (5.9)	31.2 (−0.4)	22.2 (−5.4)	14.1 (−9.9)	32.2 (0.1)
Mean minimum °F (°C)	−4.5 (−20.3)	−1.2 (−18.4)	9.4 (−12.6)	18.1 (−7.7)	25.1 (−3.8)	34.4 (1.3)	43.9 (6.6)	42.9 (6.1)	30.3 (−0.9)	18.5 (−7.5)	5.9 (−14.5)	−3.6 (−19.8)	−8.1 (−22.3)
Record low °F (°C)	−25 (−32)	−22 (−30)	−18 (−28)	6 (−14)	15 (−9)	20 (−7)	24 (−4)	27 (−3)	20 (−7)	4 (−16)	−17 (−27)	−24 (−31)	−25 (−32)
Average precipitation inches (mm)	0.65 (17)	0.74 (19)	0.90 (23)	1.06 (27)	1.04 (26)	0.60 (15)	0.49 (12)	0.54 (14)	0.75 (19)	0.75 (19)	0.66 (17)	0.67 (17)	8.85 (225)
Average snowfall inches (cm)	6.3 (16)	7.7 (20)	5.9 (15)	3.6 (9.1)	1.2 (3.0)	0.0 (0.0)	0.0 (0.0)	0.0 (0.0)	0.0 (0.0)	0.6 (1.5)	3.4 (8.6)	8.2 (21)	36.9 (94)
Average precipitation days (≥ 0.01 in)	5.3	5.6	5.3	5.7	5.9	3.1	3.2	3.8	3.6	4.1	3.9	4.6	54.1
Average snowy days (≥ 0.1 in)	2.1	3.1	2.8	1.4	0.3	0.0	0.0	0.0	0.1	0.3	1.4	2.6	14.1
Source: NOAA

== See also ==
- Becky Peak Wilderness
- Bristlecone Wilderness
