= Midas, Nevada =

Unincorporated community in Nevada, US

- Unincorporated community
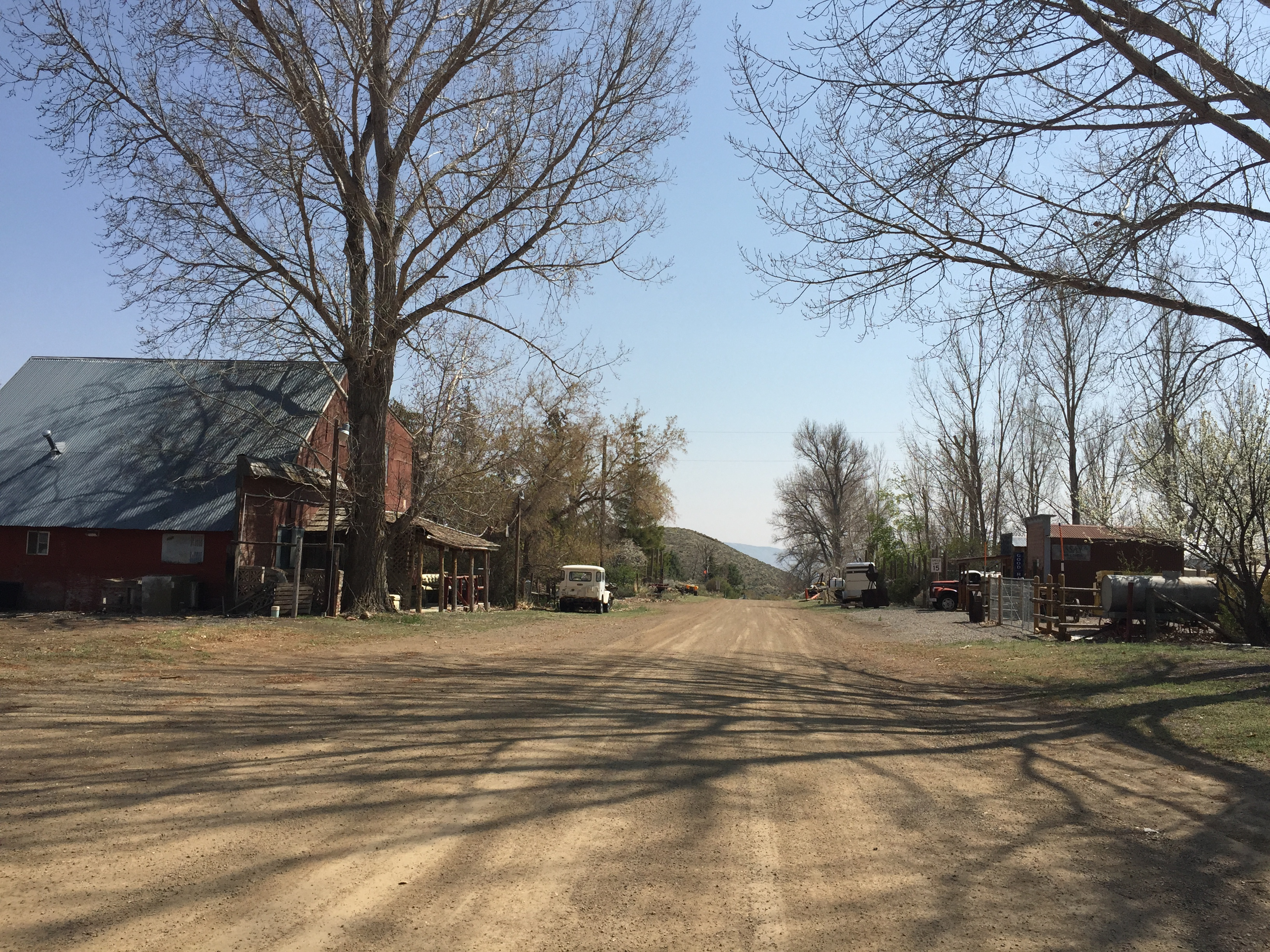
- Main Street in Midas

- Location within the state of Nevada
- Coordinates: 41°14′39″N 116°47′48″W
- Country: United States
- State: Nevada
- County: Elko
- Established: 1907
- Elevation: 5,742 ft (1,750 m)
- Time zone: UTC-8 (Pacific (PST))
  - Summer (DST): UTC-7 (PDT)
- GNIS feature ID: 845906

Midas is an unincorporated community in Elko County, Nevada. Although its population has fluctuated greatly over the years, it has never been completely abandoned. Alongside Jarbidge, the town was known as one of the biggest twentieth-century gold mining towns in Elko County.

== History ==
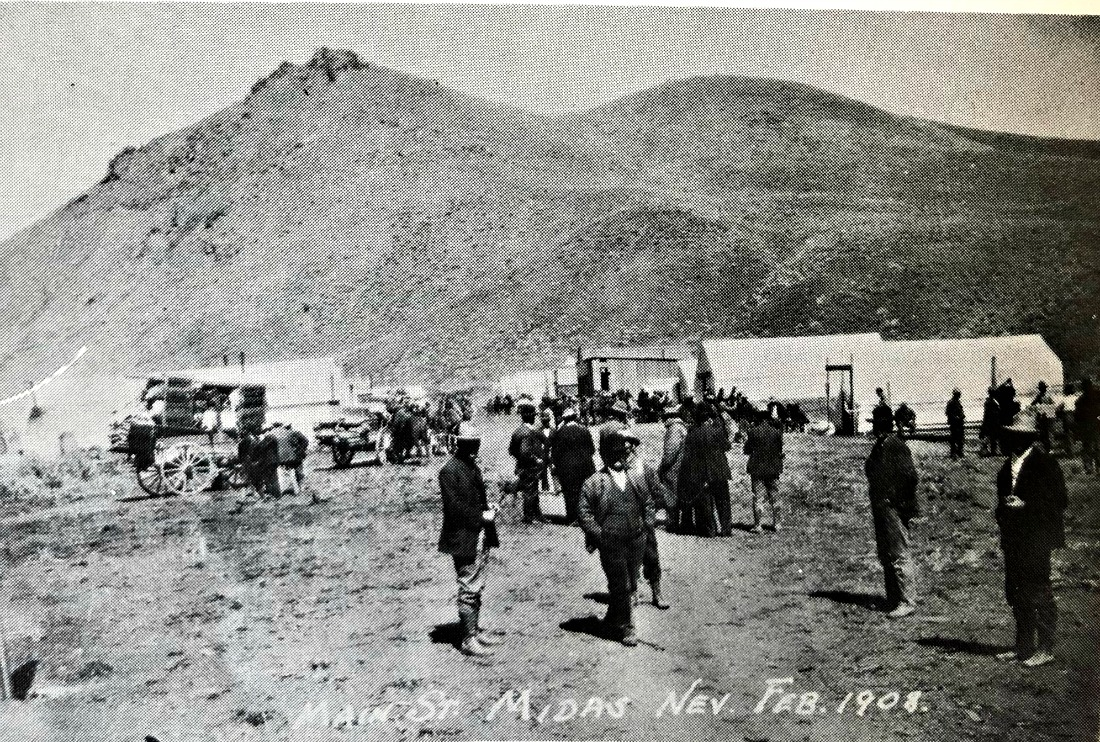
Midas, 1908

Midas' history began with the town being named Gold Circle. In June 1907, James McDuffy discovered gold at the base of Owyhee Bluffs in Elko County, Nevada. Two towns, Gold Circle and Summit were quickly created in proximity thereto. A post office was established at Gold Circle in 1907, and remained in operation until 1942. By 1908, many people moved to Gold Circle to establish mines, with the population exceeding 1,000 people by April that year. Then in 1909, with the dissolution of Summit, the federal government changed the name of Gold Circle to Midas, after King Midas.

Despite the number of available gold ores in the area, miners found themselves unable to fully reap benefits due to the lack of stamp mills, leading to only the highest quality gold ores being prioritized for shipping to mills located at a distance from Midas. Due to this limitation, the sudden influx of residents in Midas was soon followed by an equally drastic reduction: by the end of 1909, only 250 residents remained. To address the pressing need for stamp mills, several mining companies that had taken residence in the town ended up establishing six mills by the end of 1909, which, in total, could accommodate 119 tonnes of gold. With this expansion and others in the following years, Midas experienced a second mining boom that lasted from 1916 to 1921.
