= Iron Hill Museum =

Museum in Newark, Delaware

Iron Hill Museum (also known as Iron Hill Science Center) is a museum in Newark, Delaware, in the United States. Since 1968 it was located in a former African-American school, but moved to the new building in 2016.

The museum has year-round permanent displays of the local flora and fauna, local and international rock and mineral specimens, regional fossil specimens, local artifacts, and representation of the history of Iron Hill.

== Exhibits ==
- "Please Touch Wall". This exhibit allows people to see and feel the texture of different items such as turtle shell and petrified wood.
- "The Lenape People". This displays the materials used by the historical Lenape people who only made used of the items in their surroundings.
- "Rocks and Minerals". This collection shows the different rocks and minerals from Delaware and all over the world.
- "Fluorescent Rock Room". This display shows rocks that change color when exposed to ultraviolet light.
- "Taxidermy Collection". This collection displays different animals such as turtles, turkeys, deer, bears, hawks and foxes.
- "Under the Sea". This exhibit shows various shell types and shapes.
- "Delaware’s Prehistoric Sea Life". This collection depicted the different creatures (such as mosasaur) that crawled along the seafloor that eventually became Delaware.

== Other offerings ==
Iron Hill Museum also offers programs on Earth Science, Natural History, Archaeology, and Native Americans. It also has historical dioramas with miniatures created by Marnie King. History lovers can take a nature walk which is connected to connected to Mason-Dixon Trail and visit the place of the Battle of Iron Hill.

The museum's previous building can also be visited. It was built by Pierre S. duPont in 1923 and was a former African-American school. It is one of the last remaining schools of this kind in the region.
