= Terry Lee Wells Nevada Discovery Museum =

Science center, and museum in Nevada, U.S.

Coordinates: 39.522°N 119.809°W

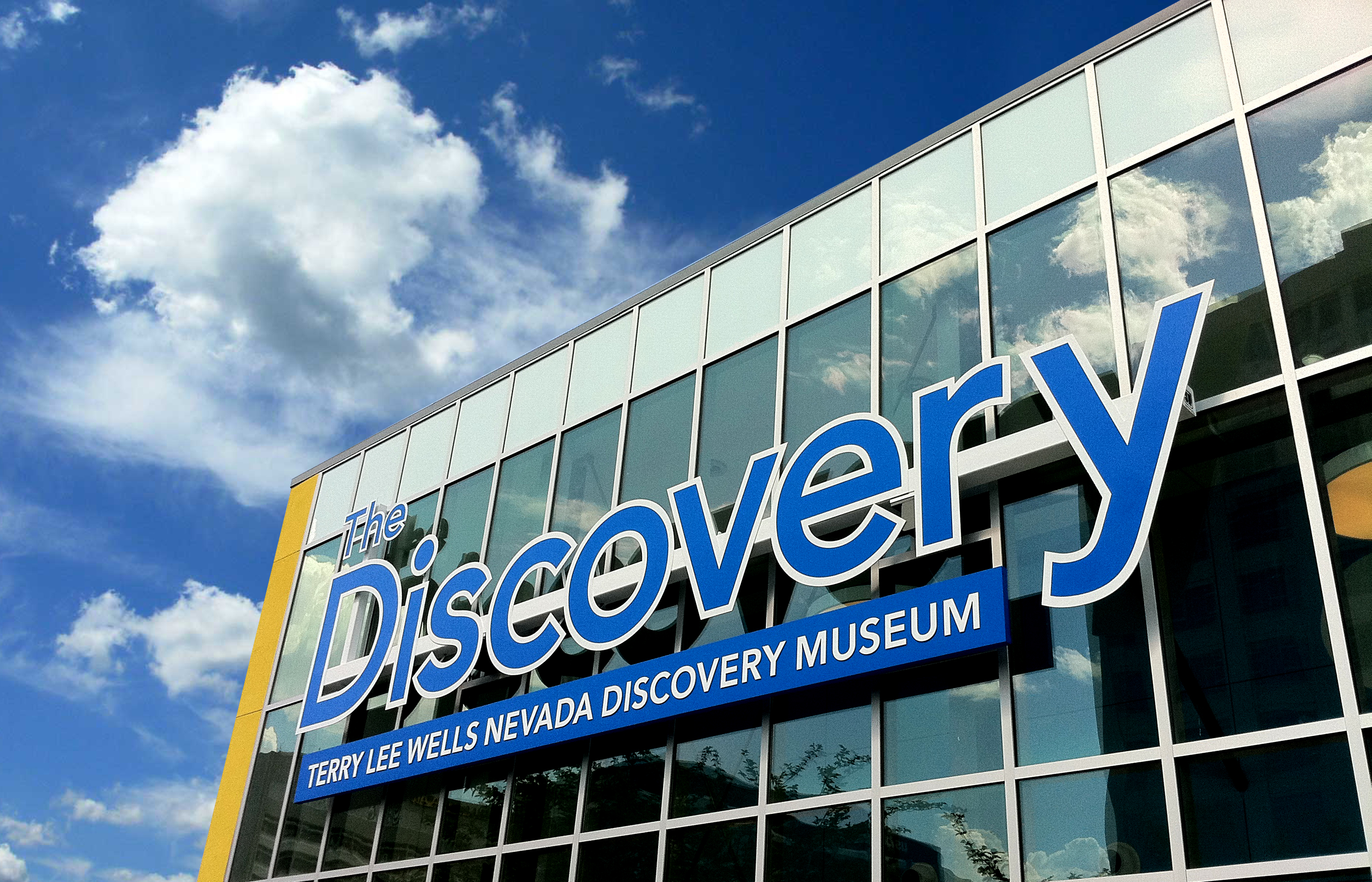

- 490 S. Center Street Reno, NV 89501
- Established: 2011
- Location: Reno, Nevada, United States
- Type: Science center, Science museum
- Visitors: 182,230 (2019)
- Website: nvdm.org

Terry Lee Wells Nevada Discovery Museum, often known as The Discovery, is a science center and museum located in Reno, Nevada. The museum, a private non-profit, was founded in 2011 and is geared towards both children and adults. It showcases science, technology, engineering, art, and math permanent and special exhibits in its 67,000 square foot space.

== History ==
The Terry Lee Wells Nevada Discovery Museum concept came from Chris Riche, an entrepreneur who conducted a feasibility study on the need for Reno to have a science center. He eventually raised funds to create the organization and Terry Lee Wells Foundation donated $4 million. In return, the museum was named after their foundation. It is housed in the former Reno City Hall, though the location has undergone numerous renovations since the museum’s opening year.

== Exhibits ==
The Terry Lee Wells Nevada Discovery Museum is primarily a science center and offers interactive exhibits that both children and adult visitors can engage with. The following are some permanent installments that still exist in the museum to date.

=== Mindbender Mansion ===
The exhibit is placed inside a Victorian mansion where both adult and child visitors can complete interactive problem-solving challenges intended for individuals and groups.

=== Inside Out: An Anatomy Experience ===
Visitors who engage with this exhibit can explore the human body’s anatomy throughout, including their own. Both adult and child visitors can engage with this exhibit.

=== Little Discoveries ===
The museum exhibits in this area are designed for children no older than five years old, ranging from hands-on car-building experience to geological displays.

== See also ==
- List of museums in Nevada
- List of science centers
- Science outreach
