= List of museums in Connecticut =

Indian and Colonial Research Center	Old Mystic	New London	History Museum	Indian & Colonial & Cultural artifacts, documents, maps, photos, genealogy, scrap/books, magazines & more in a historic brick bank building museum & exhibit gallery

This list of museums in Connecticut contains museums which are defined for this context as institutions (including nonprofit organizations, government entities, and private businesses) that collect and care for objects of cultural, artistic, scientific, or historical interest and make their collections or related exhibits available for public viewing. Non-profit and university art galleries are also included. Museums that exist only in cyberspace (i.e., virtual museums) are not included.

Inclusion in this list is generally for institutions with the name "museum" in the title. Some other institutions not included here are very like museums, and some "museums" here don't fit the typical definition of a place that shows exhibits. The Lockwood–Mathews Mansion Museum, for instance, is a historic mansion in which the "exhibit" is essentially the building itself. For Wikipedia links to institutions similar to museums in Connecticut, consult the "See also" section.

== Museums ==
Name	Town/city	County	Type	Summary
Academy Hall Museum	Rocky Hill	Hartford	Local	Operated by the Rocky Hill Historical Society; local history, culture, maritime heritage, agriculture
Academy Museum	Orange	New Haven	Local history	website, operated by the Orange Historical Society
Adam Stanton House	Clinton	Middlesex	Historic house	website, 1791 house and store with 19th-century clothing, furnishings, documents, and store inventory all belonging to the original Stanton family
Aldrich Contemporary Art Museum	Ridgefield	Fairfield	Art	Contemporary art
Allis-Bushnell House	Madison	New Haven	Historic house	Operated by the Madison Historical Society, 17th-century house with period furniture, textiles, toys, costumes, and medical, nautical, and agricultural implements
Amasa Day House Museum	Moodus	Middlesex	Historic house	Owned by Connecticut Landmarks; open by appointment; 19th-century house
American Clock & Watch Museum	Bristol	Hartford	Horology	Focus is American-made clocks and watches
American Museum of Tort Law	Winsted	Litchfield	Law	A museum developed by Ralph Nader, focusing on topics of civil justice and aspects of the legal system that handle wrongful actions that result in injury. Facilities include a theater and exhibitions on famous precedent-setting legal cases
Andrews Homestead	Meriden	New Haven	Historic house	website, operated by the Meriden Historical Society, 18th-century house
Artspace - Closed	New Haven	New Haven	Art	Contemporary art gallery
Ashbel Woodward Museum	Franklin	New London	Local	Local history exhibits and an art gallery
Avery-Copp House	Groton	New London	Historic house	website, 19th-century house with Victorian period rooms, local history exhibits
Ballard Institute and Museum of Puppetry	Storrs	Tolland	Puppetry	Part of University of Connecticut, includes hand puppets, marionettes, shadow puppets, memorabilia
Barker Character, Comic and Cartoon Museum	Cheshire	New Haven	Media	website, character toys & artifacts, comic strip, cartoon, western, T.V. and advertising memorabilia, celebrity rubber ducks
Barnes Museum	Southington	Hartford	Historic house	, 19th-century house with furnishings reflecting three generations of ownership
Barnum Museum	Bridgeport	Fairfield	Biographical	A collection related to P. T. Barnum, his circus and the history of Bridgeport, Connecticut housed in a historic building on the National Register of Historic Places
Bates-Scofield Homestead	Darien	Fairfield	Historic house	website, operated by the Darien Historical Society, 18th-century period house
Bellamy-Ferriday House and Garden	Bethlehem	Litchfield	Historic house	18th-century house, owned by Connecticut Landmarks
Bellarmine Museum of Art	Fairfield	Fairfield	Art	Part of Fairfield University, collections include Classical, Medieval, Renaissance, Baroque, Celtic and Asian art and artifacts
Blue Slope Country Museum	Franklin	New London	Farming	website, working dairy farm, museum with historic farm tools, equipment and rural life artifacts
Boothe Memorial Park and Museum	Stratford	Fairfield	Open-air	The museum's collection of buildings includes a carriage house, Americana Museum, miniature lighthouse and windmill, a clocktower museum, trolley station, chapel, and blacksmith shop. The park also has the last remaining highway toll booth in Connecticut from the Merritt Parkway.
Brayton Grist Mill	Pomfret	Windham	Mill	Late 19th-century mill and blacksmithing tools and equipment, located by Mashamoquet Brook State Park, open by appointment with the Pomfret Historical Society
Brick School House	Coventry	Tolland	Local	Local history museum run by the Coventry Historical Society; a small brick building that functioned as a one-room school from 1825 to 1953. The only one-room schoolhouse open to the public in Connecticut.
Bristol Historical Society Museum	Bristol	Hartford	Local	Local history, industry and locally made products, military collection of the Bristol Military Memorial Museum including uniforms, decorations, weapons, photographs and memorabilia
Brookfield Craft Center	Brookfield	Fairfield	Craft	School teaching skills of fine craftsmanship, associated exhibition gallery of crafts
Brookfield Museum	Brookfield	Fairfield	Local	website, local history, culture, operated by the Brookfield Historical Society
Brooklyn Historical Society Museum	Brooklyn	Windham	Local	website, local history, local American Revolutionary War hero General Israel Putnam, includes Daniel Putnam Tyler Law Office
Bruce Museum of Arts and Science	Greenwich	Fairfield	Multiple	Fine art, natural history, geology; town-run museum has art exhibits regularly reviewed in The New York Times, a section for children and a section set aside for natural history
Bryan-Andrew House	Orange	New Haven	Historic house	18th-century house, operated by the Orange Historical Society
Buell Tool Museum	Clinton	Middlesex	Technology	website, early tools and machines, open by appointment with the Clinton Historical Society
Bush–Holley House	Greenwich	Fairfield	Historic house	This former boarding house, now run by the Greenwich Historical Society, was once used by artists in the Cos Cob Art Colony, holds examples of their work and regularly offers exhibits on art and local history
Burnham–Hibbard House	Hampton	Windham	Historic house	website, 19th-century house with historic furnishings and artifacts, operated by the Hampton Antiquarian and Historical Society, open twice a year
Butler-McCook House & Garden	Hartford	Hartford	Historic house	Owned by Connecticut Landmarks, late 18th-century house with furnishings and artifacts reflecting four generations of ownership
Buttolph–Williams House	Wethersfield	Hartford	Historic house	Owned by Connecticut Landmarks, operated by the Webb-Dean-Stevens Museum, late 17th-century period house
Canton Historical Museum	Canton	Hartford	History	website, 19th-century clothing, furniture, household items, kitchen and decorative items, a Victorian parlor, toys, tools, reconstructed 19th-century general store, post office, barber shop, and blacksmith shop
Captain David Judson House	Stratford	Fairfield	Historic house	Operated by the Stratford Historical Society, 18th-century period house
Captain Palmer House	Stonington	New London	Historic house	Mid-19th-century period Victorian mansion, operated by the Stonington Historical Society
Captain's Cove Seaport	Bridgeport	Fairfield	Maritime	website, Dundon House features exhibits on local maritime history and artifacts, oyster industry, open by appointment
cARTie	Shelton	Fairfield	Children's	website, Mobile art museum gallery featuring emerging student-art in interactive, participatory ways for young audiences, open by appointment
Center for Contemporary Printmaking	Norwalk	Fairfield	Art	Changing exhibits of prints
Chaplin Museum	Chaplin	Windham	Local	18th- and 19th-century family life
Chatham Historical Society Museum	East Hampton	Middlesex	Local	Local history, culture, one-room schoolhouse
Cheney Homestead and Keeney Schoolhouse	Manchester	Hartford	Historic house	website, operated by the Manchester Historical Society, late 18th-century house and replica one-room schoolhouse
Chester Museum at the Mill	Chester	Middlesex	Local	website, operated by the Chester Historical Society, local history, culture
Children's Museum	West Hartford	Hartford	Children's	Formerly known as The Science Center of Connecticut, children's exhibits with a science and nature focus
Children's Museum of Southeastern Connecticut	Niantic	New London	Children's	
Clinton Historical Society Museum	Clinton	Middlesex	Local	website, located in Andrews Memorial Town Hall, local history, culture, Native American origins, English colonization, transportation, business, and education
Colchester Historical Society Museum	Colchester	New London	Local	website, local history
Connecticut Air and Space Center	Stratford	Fairfield	Aviation	Includes aircraft and helicopters
Connecticut Antique Machinery Association Museum	Kent	Litchfield	Technology	website, antique steam and diesel engines, farm equipment, tractors, locomotives, road construction and earth moving equipment, historic schoolhouse with natural history displays, blacksmith shop; also houses the Connecticut Museum of Mining and Mineral Science
Connecticut Audubon Society Birdcraft Museum and Sanctuary	Fairfield	Fairfield	Natural history	The oldest private songbird sanctuary in the United States. The 6-acre (24,000 m^{2}) site contains a natural history museum with mounted preserved animals displayed in dioramas and a collection of mounted African animals.
Connecticut Children's Museum	New Haven	New Haven	Children's	
Connecticut Eastern Railroad Museum	Willimantic	Windham	Railroad	website, locomotives, rolling stock, vintage railroad buildings and a six-stall roundhouse
Connecticut Fire Museum	East Windsor	Hartford	Firefighting	Part of the Connecticut Trolley Museum, firefighting vehicles and apparatus
Connecticut Museum of Culture and History	Hartford	Hartford	History	Exhibits on Connecticut history and culture
Connecticut Museum of Mining and Mineral Science	Kent	Litchfield	Industry	website, part of Connecticut Antique Machinery Association Museum, state's mining industry, geology, mining equipment
Connecticut River Museum	Essex	Middlesex	Maritime	Maritime heritage of the Connecticut River Valley, shipbuilding
Connecticut Science Center	Hartford	Hartford	Science	
Connecticut State Museum of Natural History	Storrs	Tolland	Natural	Natural history and cultural history of Connecticut, part of the University of Connecticut
Connecticut Trolley Museum	East Windsor	Hartford	Railroad	Electric trolley cars, includes the Connecticut Fire Museum
CRRA Trash Museum	Hartford	Hartford	Science	Recycling and the environment
Contemporary Art Galleries at UConn	Storrs	Tolland	Art	Contemporary trends and issues in visual arts
Cornwall Historical Society	Cornwall	Litchfield	History	website, summer exhibits of local history
Cummings Art Galleries	New London	New London	Art	Part of the Cummings Art Center at Connecticut College
Cushing Center	New Haven	New Haven	Library	Formally the Harvey Cushing/John Hay Whitney Medical Library, displays from its collections of rare books, medical history documents and artifacts
Custom House Maritime Museum	New London	New London	Maritime	Local maritime history, ship models, the ship La Amistad, customs, regional lighthouses, operated by the New London Maritime Society
Danbury Museum and Historical Society	Danbury	Fairfield	Multiple	Focusing on Danbury-area history, the museum has five buildings including the John Rider House, the Marian Anderson Studio and the Charles Ives birthplace.
Danbury Railway Museum	Danbury	Fairfield	Railroad	The museum has a railroad yard full of restored and unrestored railroad equipment, and the restored 1903 station house containing exhibits of photographs and railroad paraphernalia, model train layouts, an extensive reference library, and a gift shop. Visitors can take a 25-minute ride the "Rail Yard Local" on weekends in season.
Daniel Benton Homestead	Tolland	Tolland	Historic house	website, operated by the Tolland Historical Society, early 18th-century period house
Daniel Putnam Tyler Law Office	Brooklyn	Windham	Historic house	website, located at Brooklyn Historical Society Museum
Darling House Museum	Woodbridge	New Haven	Historic house	Run by the Amity and Woodbridge Historical Society, open by appointment and for special events, late 18th-century farmhouse and outbuildings
Davison Art Center	Middletown	Middlesex	Art	Part of Wesleyan University
D'Elia Antique Tool Museum	Scotland	Windham	Technology	website, located in the Scotland Public Library, collection of antique woodworking planes and tools
Deacon John Graves House	Madison	New Haven	Historic house	1685 house used by seven generations of one family
Denison Homestead	Mystic	New London	Historic house	Early 18th-century house with rooms furnished to reflect different eras
Denison Pequotsepos Nature Center	Mystic	New London	Natural history	website, dioramas of different habitats, live animals
Derrin House	Avon	Hartford	Historic house	website, one of three properties owned by the Avon Historical Society, 18th-century farmhouse
Dinosaur State Park and Arboretum	Rocky Hill	Hartford	Natural history	Dinosaur tracks, models, dioramas, arboretum
Discovery Museum and Planetarium	Bridgeport	Fairfield	Science	Interactive science exhibits, high-definition movies and daily planetarium shows, Challenger Learning Center
Dudley Farm	Guilford	New Haven	Farm	website, late 19th-century restored farmhouse, barns, and grounds, tools and farm equipment
Earthplace	Westport	Fairfield	Natural history	Wildlife dioramas of seasons and ecosystems in Connecticut, interactive exhibits, live animals, wildlife sanctuary with trails
East Haddam Historical Society Museum	East Haddam	Middlesex	Local	website, local history, industry, costumes
Ebenezer Avery House	Groton	New London	Historic house	Located in Fort Griswold State Park, 18th-century period house
Edward Waldo House	Scotland	Windham	Historic house	Operated by the Scotland Historical Society, 18th-century period house, open by appointment and for special events
Elisha White House	Clinton	Middlesex	Historic house	website, mid-18th-century house known as "Old Brick", open by appointment with the Clinton Historical Society
Eli Whitney Museum	Hamden	New Haven	Science	Inventions and inventor Eli Whitney, toy maker A.C. Gilbert
Enoch Kelsey House	Newington	Hartford	Historic house	Operated by the Newington Historical Society, late 18th-century house
Fairfield Museum and History Center	Fairfield	Fairfield	Local	Local history, changing exhibits, a library and reading room, a family education center, and an 80-seat theater, founded by the Fairfield Historical Society
Falls Village-Canaan Historical Society Museum	Falls Village	Litchfield	Local	website, local history, industry
Fire Museum	Manchester	Hartford	Firefighting	website, horse-drawn and motorized firefighting vehicles and apparatus, equipment, memorabilia
Florence Griswold Museum	Old Lyme	New London	Art	Noted for its collection of American Impressionist paintings, collections include fine art, sculpture, works on paper, artist's studio material, toys and dolls, ceramics, furniture, textiles, decorative arts and historic artifacts
Fort Griswold Battlefield State Park	Groton	New London	Military	Restored 18th-century earthwork battery, cannons, shot furnace and powder magazine, includes the Monument House Museum with exhibits about the American Revolutionary War, and the 18th-century Ebenezer Avery House
Fort Trumbull State Park	New London	New London	Military	Visitor center depicts over 225 years of military history and technological advances from the Revolutionary War to the Cold War
Gallery of Art at Sacred Heart University	Fairfield	Fairfield	Art	website
Gasoline Alley Automotive Museum	Stafford Springs	Tolland	Automotive	Collection of Ford memorabilia, open by appointment only
Gateway Museum at Nature's Art Village	Montville	New London	History	website, focuses on the past 200 years of America's progression in technology and tools, features period business and shop displays, agriculture equipment, steam engines, fire fighting equipment, print shop
Gay-Hoyt House	Sharon	Litchfield	Local	website, operated by the Sharon Historical Society, local history, American furniture and decorative arts, iron and iron-industry related artifacts
General David Humphreys House	Ansonia	New Haven	Historic house	Headquarters of the Derby Historical Society, home to America's first ambassador under George Washington, restored to mid-18th-century appearance
Gertrude Warner Boxcar Museum	Putnam	Windham	Biographical	website, artifacts and memorabilia of Gertrude Chandler Warner, author of The Boxcar Children series
Gillette Castle State Park	East Haddam	Middlesex	Historic house	Unusual early 20th-century "castle" home built by actor William Gillette, famous for his portrayals of Sherlock Holmes
Glass House	New Canaan	Fairfield	Historic house	Modern house designed and owned by architect Philip Johnson
Glebe House	Woodbury	Litchfield	Historic house	Mid-18th-century period farmhouse, and 20th-century English garden designed by Gertrude Jekyll
Governor Jonathan Trumbull House	Lebanon	New London	Historic house	Late 18th-century period house operated by the Connecticut Daughters of the American Revolution
Greater Middletown Military Museum	Middletown	Middlesex	Military	website, small display
Gridley-Parsons-Staples Homestead	Farmington	Hartford	Local	Operated by the Farmington Historical Society
Griswold Historical Society Museum	Jewett City	New London	History	Local history, located in the Slater Library, life in New England during the 18th and 19th centuries
Gunn Memorial Library and Museum	Washington	Litchfield	Local	website, local history
Gurleyville Grist Mill	Mansfield	Tolland	Mill	website, 19th-century grist mill, operated by Joshua's Trust, adjacent miller's house was the birthplace of Governor Wilbur L. Cross
Haddam Shad Museum	Higganum	Middlesex	Industry	website, museum about the heritage of shad fishing on the Connecticut River, CT State Kids review
Harriet Beecher Stowe Center	Hartford	Hartford	Historic house	Victorian home of author Harriet Beecher Stowe
Haul of Fame Trucking Museum	Canterbury	Windham	History	information, historic truck collection
Hempsted Houses	New London	New London	Historic house	Owned by Connecticut Landmarks, includes the 1678 Joshua Hempsted House and the 1759 Nathaniel Hempsted House
Henry Whitfield State Museum	Guilford	New Haven	Historic house	Originally a fortress for the community, this oldest house in Connecticut and oldest stone house in New England has three floors filled with 17th-, 18th-, and 19th-century furnishings, along with an introductory exhibit on the house's history; there are changing exhibits in two galleries.
Hezekiah Chaffee House	Windsor	Hartford	Historic house	Mid-18th-century Georgian colonial house and doctor's office
Hicks-Stearns Family Museum	Tolland	Tolland	Historic house	website, 19th-century house reflecting three generations of owners up to the Victorian era
Hill-Stead Museum	Farmington	Hartford	Art	Known for its French Impressionist masterpieces, architecture, and stately grounds
Hill's Academy	Essex	Middlesex	Local history	Operated by the Essex Historical Society
Historical Houses at Martin Park	East Hartford	Hartford	Historic house	Run by East Hartford Historical Society, includes the late 18th-century Makens Bemont House, mid-19th-century Goodwin Schoolhouse, and late 19th-century Burnham Blacksmith Shop
Hitchcock-Phillips House	Cheshire	New Haven	Historic house	website, run by Cheshire Historical Society
Hotchkiss-Fyler House Museum	Torrington	Litchfield	Historic house	Operated by the Torrington Historical Society, collections include glass, porcelain, early American paintings
Hotchkiss House Museum	Prospect	New Haven	Local history	website, operated by the Prospect Historical Society
Housatonic Museum of Art	Bridgeport	Fairfield	Art	Part of Housatonic Community College, includes works by Rodin, Picasso, Matisse, Miró and Chagall. Much of the collection is displayed throughout the college.
Hoyt-Barnum House	Stamford	Fairfield	Historic house	Open by appointment with the Stamford Historical Society, 1699 house with 17th- and 18th-century furnishings
Huntington Homestead	Scotland	Windham	Historic house	18th-century boyhood home of Governor Samuel Huntington
Husky Heritage Sports Museum	Storrs	Tolland	Sports	History and memorabilia of UConn Husky athletics
Hyland House	Guilford	New Haven	History	Living museum of colonial life and architecture
Ireland’s Great Hunger Museum	Hamden	New Haven	Art	Art related to the Irish Great Hunger of 1845–1852
Imagine Nation Museum	Bristol	Hartford	Children's	website, hands-on, interactive children's museum for ages 2 to 10
Institute For American Indian Studies	Washington	Litchfield	Native American	History and culture of Connecticut's Native American peoples
Isham-Terry House	Hartford	Hartford	Historic house	Owned by Connecticut Landmarks, late 19th-century house and doctor's office
Jabez Smith House	Groton	New London	Historic house	18th-century house with 18th- and 19th-century antiques
James Morris Museum	Morris	Litchfield	History	Located in Morris Town Hall, also Aline Brothier Morris Reading Room, contains James Morris III family archives and heirlooms, local history displays, reference library
Jillson House Museum	Windham	Windham	Historic house	Operated by the Windham Historical Society, 18th-century house with collections of household items, quilts, toys, dolls,
John Bishop House & Museum	Lisbon	New London	Historic house	Early 19th-century house, operated by the Lisbon Historical Society
Joseloff Gallery	West Hartford	Hartford	Art	website, contemporary art gallery of the Hartford Art School of the University of Hartford, located in the Harry Jack Gray Center
Joseph N. Goff House Museum and Cultural Center	East Hampton	Middlesex	Local	website, local history, houses artifacts and memorabilia of Connecticut's 84th Governor, William O'Neill
Keeler Tavern Museum	Ridgefield	Fairfield	History	18th-century tavern with furnishings, artifacts and costumed guides
Kellogg-Eddy House	Newington	Hartford	Historic house	Run by Newington Historical Society, early 19th-century Georgian-style house
Kidcity Children's Museum	Middletown	Middlesex	Children's	website, interactive exhibits for ages one to eight
King House Museum	Suffield	Hartford	Historic house	website, run by Suffield Historical Society, mid-18th-century house with collection of early Connecticut Valley furniture, local history artifacts
Killingly Historical Center	Danielson	Windham	Local	website, local history
Knights of Columbus Museum	New Haven	New Haven	Religious	website, art and historic artifacts about the heritage of Catholicism and the Knights of Columbus
Lebanon Historical Society Museum	Lebanon	New London	Local	website, local history, also operates Dr. William Beaumont House
Lee's Academy	Madison	New Haven	Education	website, operated by the Madison Historical Society, early 19th-century schoolhouse used for lectures and special exhibits
Leffingwell House Museum	Norwich	New London	Historic house	website, early 18th-century period home of Revolutionary patriot, merchant, and industrialist Christopher Leffingwell
Lewis Walpole Library	Farmington	Hartford	Art	Department of the Yale University Library, changing exhibits of art from its collections, also life of author Horace Walpole
Litchfield History Museum	Litchfield	Litchfield	Local	website, operated by the Litchfield Historical Society, local history, collections of furniture, paintings, textiles, toys, ceramics, trade signs, and other fine and decorative arts
Lock Museum of America	Terryville	Litchfield	History	Its eight display rooms hold the largest collection of colonial and antique locks in the United States, including rooms devoted to bank locks and Yale locks. See also Timex Museum in Waterbury
Lockwood-Mathews Mansion	Norwalk	Fairfield	Historic house	A 62-room Second Empire-style mansion on both the National Register of Historic Places and National Historic Landmark lists
Lost in New Haven	New Haven	New Haven	Local	Local history, artifacts and memorabilia
Luddy/Taylor Connecticut Valley Tobacco Museum	Windsor	Hartford	Agriculture	Tobacco curing barn with exhibits of early and modern equipment used to grow the crop, and a year-round facility with exhibits of photographs, writings, and other documents
Lutz Children's Museum	Manchester	Hartford	Children's	
Lyman Allyn Art Museum	New London	New London	Art	Permanent collection includes over 10,000 paintings, drawings, prints, sculptures, furniture and decorative arts; emphasis is on American art from the 18th to 20th centuries
Lyme Academy College of Fine Arts	Old Lyme	New London	Art	Features exhibitions of professional, alumni and student art
MacDonough Gallery of Albertus Magnus College	New Haven	New Haven	Art	
Manchester History Center	Manchester	Hartford	Local	website, local history, silk and textile industry, operated by the Manchester Historical Society
Mansfield Historical Society Museum	Mansfield	Tolland	Local	website, local history, culture
Mark Twain House and Museum	Hartford	Hartford	Historic house	Gilded Age home of author Mark Twain
Martha A. Parsons House Museum	Enfield	Hartford	Historic house	website, operated by the Enfield Historical Society, late 18th-century house with furnishings from over 180 years of ownership
Mashantucket Pequot Museum & Research Center	Mashantucket	New London	Native American	History and culture of the Mashantucket Pequot Tribe and the Pequot, area natural history
Matthew Curtiss House	Newtown	Fairfield	Historic house	website, operated by the Newtown Historical Society, 18th-century Colonial saltbox house
Mattatuck Museum	Waterbury	New Haven	Multiple	Regional history and Connecticut art. Artists in the collection include John Trumbull, Erastus Salisbury Field, Frederic Church, John Frederick Kensett, Arshile Gorky, Kay Sage, Yves Tanguy, Peter Poskas, Abe Ajay and Alexander Calder. Waterbury Button Museum is a collection of about 10,000 buttons from all over the world, including some from the 18th and 19th centuries.
Merritt Parkway Museum	Stratford	Fairfield	Transportation	website, history of the design and construction of the Merritt Parkway
Middlebury Historical Society Museum	Middlebury	New Haven	Local	website, local history
Middlesex County Historical Society Museum	Middletown	Middlesex	Local	website, located in General Mansfield House, local history and culture
Middletown Sports Hall of Fame and Museum	Middletown	Middlesex	Hall of fame - sports	website, town's sports figures
Milford Historical Museum	Milford	New Haven	Historic homes	website, operated by the Milford Historical Society, Colonial homes open for tour that date to 18th century. The Eells-Stow House is one of the oldest homes in Connecticut.
Mill Hill Historic Park	Norwalk	Fairfield	Open-air	Three buildings: 1835 Norwalk Town House, circa 1740 Governor Fitch law office and the Downtown District Schoolhouse, circa 1826, operated by the Norwalk Historical Society
Millstone Energy Education Center	Waterford	New London	Science	Located at the Millstone Nuclear Power Plant, exhibits about nuclear energy and Long Island Sound, now only scheduled tours by school groups, Millstone's Energy Education Programs
Monte Cristo Cottage	New London	New London	Historic house	Summer home of American playwright Eugene O'Neill
Museum of Andover History	Andover	Tolland	Local	website, local history, historic household items, located in the Old Town Hall
Museum of Connecticut Glass	Coventry	Tolland	Industry - glass	website, historical glass made in the numerous glassworks of Connecticut, open by request and for special events
Museum of Connecticut History	Hartford	Hartford	History	Located at Connecticut State Library, Connecticut's government, industrial and military history
Museum of Fife & Drum	Ivoryton	Middlesex	Music	website, operated by the Company of Fifers & Drummers, includes drums, fifes, military swords, music, uniforms, medals
Museum of Jewish Civilization	West Hartford	Hartford	Ethnic - Jewish	website, located inside the Mortensen Library in the Harry Jack Gray Center at the University of Hartford, exhibits of Jewish art, history and culture
Museum on the Green	Glastonbury	Hartford	Local	website, local history, operated by the Historical Society of Glastonbury
Mystic Museum of Art	Mystic	New London	Local	website, art museum, non-profit operated by Mystic Art Association. Galleries, exhibitions, studio courses, education outreach, wedding events
Mystic Seaport	Mystic	New London	Maritime	Living history museum focusing on 19th-century maritime industries, including whaling; with period ships and buildings
Nathan Hale Homestead	Coventry	Tolland	Historic house	Operated by Connecticut Landmarks, 18th home of the family of American Revolutionary War spy Nathan Hale
Nathan Lester House	Ledyard	New London	Historic house	18th-century farmhouse and outbuildings
Nathaniel Backus House	Norwich	New London	Historic house	Operated by the Faith Trumbull Chapter of the Daughters of the American Revolution, open for events along with adjacent Perkins-Rockwell House
National Helicopter Museum	Stratford	Fairfield	Aviation	Housed in the eastbound building of the Stratford railroad station, the museum exhibits images and objects related to the history of the aviation and helicopter industry in Stratford, the home of Sikorsky Aircraft.
Naugatuck Historical Society Museum	Naugatuck	New Haven	Local	website, local history, located in a former train station
Nellie E. McKnight Museum	Ellington	Tolland	Historic house	Built in 1812 in the Federalist style; home of the Ellington Historical Society
New Britain Industrial Museum	New Britain	Hartford	Industry	website, locally made tools and hardware from Stanley Works, Fafnir bearings, Landers, Frary & Clark, American Hardware Corporation, Acme Monaco Corporation and North & Judd
New Britain Museum of American Art	New Britain	Hartford	Art	American art
New Britain Youth Museums	New Britain	Hartford	Children's	website, two facilities in New Britain: 30 High Street and Hungerford Park.
New Canaan Historical Society Museums	New Canaan	Fairfield	Open-air	website, includes Town House, John Rogers Studio, Rock School, Tool Museum and Hanford-Silliman House
New England Air Museum	Windsor Locks	Hartford	Aviation	website, a large collection of aircraft with exhibits on the history of Sikorsky Aircraft, the Tuskegee Airmen, and the 58th Bomb Wing Memorial
New England Carousel Museum	Bristol	Hartford	Art	website, antique carousel animals
New England Civil War Museum	Rockville	Tolland	Military	Large collection of Civil War items; archives relating to the Grand Army of the Republic.
New Haven Museum and Historical Society	New Haven	New Haven	Local	Local history and culture, fine and decorative arts
New Milford Historical Society and Museum	New Milford	Litchfield	Local	website, local history, 18th-century cooking hearth, antique toys,
Noah Webster House	West Hartford	Hartford	Historic house	Operated by the West Hartford Historical Society, 18th-century home of American lexicographer Noah Webster
Noden-Reed Park Museum	Windsor Locks	Hartford	Local	info, operated by the Windsor Locks Historical Society, Victorian farmhouse with local history displays
Northeast States Civilian Conservation Corps Museum	Stafford Springs	Tolland	History	History and memorabilia of the Civilian Conservation Corps in the Northeast, located in Shenipsit State Forest
Northrop House Museum	Sherman	Fairfield	Historic house	website, early 19th-century house and barn, operated by the Sherman Historical Society, open by appointment
Northwest Park Nature Center	Windsor	Hartford	Natural history	Live animals, natural history displays, nature education programs
Norwalk Historical Society Museum	Norwalk	Fairfield	Local history	website
Ogden House and Gardens	Fairfield	Fairfield	Historic house	Owned by Fairfield Museum and History Center, 18th-century period farmhouse
Old Bethlehem Historical Society Museum	Bethlehem	Litchfield	History	website, local history, open by appointment
Old Lighthouse Museum	Stonington	New London	Local	Local history and maritime displays in a historic lighthouse, operated by the Stonington Historical Society
Old Manchester Museum	Manchester	Hartford	Local	website, operated by the Manchester Historical Society, local history, culture, industry, mid-1800s dresses and furniture, school display, pharmacy and medicine exhibit, Manchester Sports Hall of Fame, Spencer and Springfield Rifle exhibits, household items
Old New-Gate Prison & Copper Mine	East Granby	Hartford	Prison	18th-century prison
Old State House, Joseph Steward Museum of Oddities and Curiosities	Hartford	Hartford	Multiple	Original state capitol, exhibits of Connecticut and Hartford history, also houses a recreation of a museum of unusual natural history specimens
Old Stone Schoolhouse	Farmington	Hartford	Education	website, one-room schoolhouse, operated by the Farmington Historical Society
Old Store Museum	Sherman	Fairfield	Local	website, 19th-century period store display, exhibits of local history and art, operated by the Sherman Historical Society
Old Tolland County Courthouse	Tolland	Tolland	Jail museum	19th-century county courthouse, operated by the Tolland Historical Society
Old Tolland County Jail and Museum	Tolland	Tolland	Jail museum	19th-century county jail and jailer's house with local history displays, operated by the Tolland Historical Society
Old Town Hall Museum	Enfield	Hartford	Local	website, operated by the Enfield Historical Society, late 18th-century town hall with exhibits of local history
Oliver Ellsworth Homestead	Windsor	Hartford	Historic house	Operated by the CT DAR, 18th-century period house of Oliver Ellsworth
Osborne Homestead Museum	Derby	New Haven	Historic house	Estate house with collection of antiques and fine art
Paier College of Art	Hamden	New Haven	Art	Student art exhibits
Pardee Morris House	New Haven	New Haven	Historic house	18th-century period house, operated by the New Haven Museum and Historical Society
Peabody Museum of Natural History	New Haven	New Haven	Natural history	Part of Yale University, exhibits include dinosaurs, human and mammal evolution, wildlife dioramas, Egyptian artifacts, and the birds, minerals and Native Americans of Connecticut
Peoples State Forest Nature Museum	Barkhamsted	Litchfield	Natural history	Located in Peoples State Forest, area plants, animals, pioneers, Native American, forestry, quarrying
Phelps-Hatheway House	Suffield	Hartford	Historic house	website, owned by Connecticut Landmarks, 18th-century house with period Connecticut furniture, formal garden
Phelps Tavern Museum	Simsbury	Hartford	Historic tavern	Late 18th- to early 19th-century tavern, operated by the Simsbury Historical Society
Pine Grove Schoolhouse	Avon	Hartford	Education	website, one of three properties owned by the Avon Historical Society, early 20th-century period schoolhouse
Plainville Historic Center	Plainville	Hartford	History	website, operated by the Plainville Historical Society, local history, agriculture, Farmington Canal, toys, turn-of-the-century kitchen, Victorian parlor, tools, Native American artifacts, minerals
Pleasant Valley Schoolhouse Museum	South Windsor	Hartford	Education	Operated by South Windsor Historical Society, one-room schoolhouse
Portersville Academy	Mystic	New London	Education	website, owned by Mystic River Historical Society, 1840s period schoolroom
Pratt House	Essex	Middlesex	Historic house	Operated by the Essex Historical Society, 18th-century house
Prudence Crandall Museum	Canterbury	Windham	History	Exhibits on Prudence Crandall, women's history and local history; located in Crandall's home on the Canterbury Green
Putnam Cottage	Greenwich	Fairfield	Historic house	Revolutionary War period tavern
Putnam Elms	Brooklyn	Windham	Historic house	website, 18th-century home
Putnam Memorial State Park Museum	Redding	Fairfield	History	Exhibits depict Colonial life, artifacts from the camp site and reconstructed buildings
Railroad Museum of New England	Thomaston	Litchfield	Railroad	Heritage railroad and museum
Real Art Ways	Hartford	Hartford	Art	Non-profit contemporary arts organization, several art galleries, programs in visual arts, live arts, film and video
Regina A. Quick Center for the Arts	Fairfield	Fairfield	Art	Part of Fairfield University, includes the Thomas J. Walsh, Jr. Art Gallery
Rogers Studio and Museum	New Canaan	Fairfield	Historic artist's studio	Built in 1878 by John Rogers, called "the people's sculptor" in the latter 19th century, the studio houses a collection of Rogers' groups of plaster statuary; the display area has been reconfigured to reflect the feeling of the artist's studio; operated by the New Canaan Historical Society.
Roseland Cottage	Woodstock	Windham	Historic house	Operated by Historic New England, mid-19th-century Gothic Revival cottage visited by three U.S. presidents
The Ruby and Calvin Fletcher African American History Museum	Stratford	Fairfield	History	website, operated by the Ruby and Calvin Fletcher African American History Museum
Ruth Callander House Museum of Portland History	Portland	Middlesex	History	website, operated by the Portland Historical Society
Salem Historical Society and Museum	Salem	New London	History	information, local history, open seasonally
Savin Rock Museum	West Haven	New Haven	History	website, local history
Sawmill Park Mill Museum	Ledyard	New London	Historic site	Reconstructed 19th-century water-powered up and down sawmill, owned by the town and administered by the Ledyard Historic District Commission
Scantic Academy Museum	East Windsor	Hartford	Education	Historic schoolhouse
Schelfhaudt Gallery at the University of Bridgeport	Bridgeport	Fairfield	Art	Part of the Arnold Bernhard Center
Schoolhouse #3	Avon	Hartford	Local	website, one of three properties owned by the Avon Historical Society, former schoolhouse with local history displays, open by appointment
Seth-Thomas Bradstreet House	Thomaston	Litchfield	Historic house	information, owned by Seth Thomas (clockmaker)
Seton Gallery of the University of New Haven	New Haven	New Haven	Art	
Seven Hearths	Kent	Litchfield	History	website, operated by the Kent Historical Society
Shaw Mansion Museum	New London	New London	Historic house	Operated by the New London Historical Society
Sheffield Island Lighthouse	Norwalk	Fairfield	Lighthouse	Operated by the Norwalk Seaport Association, accessible by boat
Shelton History Center	Shelton	Fairfield	History	website, operated by the Shelton Historical Society
Shore Line Trolley Museum	East Haven	New Haven	Railroad	
Silpe Gallery	West Hartford	Hartford	Art	website, showcase for student work of the Hartford Art School of the University of Hartford
Solomon Goffe House	Meriden	New Haven	Historic house	18th-century period house
Stony Creek Museum	Branford	New Haven	History	website, history, culture and community of Stony Creek, the Stony Creek Quarry and the Thimble Islands
Slater Memorial Museum and Converse Art Gallery at Norwich Free Academy	Norwich	New London	Art	The museum's collection includes "contemporary Connecticut crafts, 17th- to 19th-century European paintings and decorative arts, African and Oceanic sculpture, Native American objects, and a plaster cast collection of Egyptian, Archaic, Greek, Roman and Renaissance sculpture, and the adjacent Converse Art Gallery.
Sloane-Stanley Museum	Kent	Litchfield	History	Studio and antique collections of Eric Sloane
Smith–Harris House	East Lyme	New London	Historic house	19th-century period house, listed on the National Register of Historic Places as the Thomas Avery House, c. 1845
Solomon Rockwell House	Winchester	Litchfield	Multiple	Home to the Winchester Historical Society
Somers Historical Society Museum	Somers	Tolland	History	website
Sono Switchtower Museum	Norwalk	Fairfield	Railroad	The tiny museum exhibits the railroad switch tower in South Norwalk, where tracks were physically switched at the intersection of the Danbury Branch and the New Haven Line. Original equipment is supplemented by some photographs and demonstrations by docents website
Southington Historical Society	Southington	Hartford	Local history	Includes photos, area sports and school mementos, industry and business items, military artifacts
Stafford Historical Society Museum	Stafford Springs	Tolland	History	website
Stamford Museum and Nature Center	Stamford	Fairfield	Multiple	Includes farm with animals, nature center, museum with natural history, art and Native American displays, an observatory and planetarium
Stanley-Whitman House	Farmington	Hartford	Historic house	17th-century house with furnishings and artifacts from the 17th to 19th century
Stanton-Davis Homestead Museum	Pawcatuck	New London	Historic house	Planned museum of a restored 17th-century homestead
Stepping Stones Museum for Children	Norwalk	Fairfield	Children's	
Stevens-Frisbie House	Cromwell	Middlesex	Local history	website, home to Cromwell Historical Society
Stone House	Deep River	Middlesex	Historic house	website, operated by the Deep River Historical Society
Swain-Harrison House	Branford	New Haven	Historic house	Operated by the Branford Historical Society, 18th-century period house
Stone-Otis House	Orange	New Haven	Historic house	website, operated by the Orange Historical Society, mid 19th-century house
Strong-Porter Museum	Coventry	Tolland	Local history	Operated by the Coventry Historical Society
Strong-Howard House	Windsor	Hartford	Historic house	website, known for many years as the Lt. Walter Fyler House, operated by the Windsor Historical Society
Tapping Reeve House and Law School	Litchfield	Litchfield	Education	Also known as Litchfield Law School, 19th-century school
Thankful Arnold House Museum	Haddam	Middlesex	Historic house	website, owned by Haddam Historical Society
The Dinosaur Place at Nature's Art Village	Montville	New London	Natural History	60 acre outdoor Dinosaur park with over 40 life-sized dinosaurs.
Thomas Griswold House Museum	Guilford	New Haven	Historic house	Operated by the Guilford Keeping Society, includes the late 18th-century period New England saltbox house, a blacksmith shop, barn with farm tools and implements, two corn cribs and a Victorian era three seat outhouse
Thomas Lee House and Museum	East Lyme	New London	Historic house	17th-century period house, operated by the East Lyme Historical Society
Thomaston Historical Society Museum	Thomaston	Litchfield	History	information, open by appointment only
Thompson Historical Society Museum	Thompson	Windham	History	website, also known as the Ellen Larned Memorial Building and Museum
Tool Museum	New Canaan	Fairfield	History / Commodity - tools	Tiny museum displays tools use by cabinetmakers, wheelwrights, tanners, shoemakers, coopers, builders and others. A separate room re-creates a 19th-century printing office. website
Torrington History Museum	Torrington	Litchfield	Local	website, operated by the Torrington Historical Society
Tourtelotte Memorial Room	Thompson	Windham	History	info, located in Tourtelotte Memorial High School
Trumbull Historical Society Museum	Trumbull	Fairfield	Historic house	website, 19th-century historical building with displays and programs dedicated to Trumbull history
Trumbull War Office	Lebanon	New London	Historic house	Owned by the Sons of the American Revolution, 18th-century building used by Jonathan Trumbull for convening the Council of Safety during the American Revolution
Unionville Museum	Unionville	Hartford	Local	website, local history
University of Saint Joseph Art Gallery	West Hartford	Hartford	Art	Features a collection of over 2000 pieces including 20th-century American paintings, and European and American prints from the 15th century to the present
U.S. Coast Guard Museum	New London	New London	Maritime	History of the U.S. Coast Guard
U.S Military Museum	Danbury	Fairfield	Military	website, houses over 10,000 artifacts covering all of the armed services of the United States. Outdoor exhibits include tanks, cars, trucks and guns. Formerly the Military Museum of Southern New England.
U.S. Navy Submarine Force Museum and Library	Groton	New London	Maritime	Includes the USS Nautilus (SSN-571) submarine, a museum ship
Vernon Historical Society Museum	Vernon	Tolland	History	website, located in the former Vernon Grange building
Vintage Radio and Communications Museum of Connecticut	Windsor	Hartford	Technology	Collection of technology related to vintage communications: radio, television, tubes, video, telephones; website
Wadsworth Atheneum	Hartford	Hartford	Art	
Wadsworth Mansion at Long Hill	Middletown	Middlesex	Historic house	Early 20th-century mansion and estate
Wallop School Museum	Enfield	Hartford	Education	website, operated by Enfield Historical Society, late 18th-century one-room schoolhouse restored to appear as for it last use in 1947
Ward-Heitman House	West Haven	New Haven	Historic house	website, period rooms show the lives of the families at various times in the history of the house, from colonial through post-Civil War
Warren's Occult Museum	Monroe	Fairfield	History	website, open for tours and special events; features historic, obscure and "haunted" objects related to the occult
Waterford Historical Society Museums	Waterford	New London	Open-air	Historic buildings on the green including 1740 Jordan Schoolhouse, Margaret W. Stacey Memorial Barn/Museum, 1838 Beebe-Phillips House, Jordan Park House, corn crib, blacksmith shop, operated by the Waterford Historical Society
Webb-Deane-Stevens Museum	Wethersfield	Hartford	Historic house	Operated by the National Society of the Colonial Dames of America, sites include the Joseph Webb House, Silas Deane House, Isaac Stevens House and the Buttolph-Williams House
Weir Farm National Historic Site	Wilton	Fairfield	Art	Historic house and studio of artist J. Alden Weir, also changing art and history exhibits
Welles-Shipman-Ward House	Glastonbury	Hartford	Historic house	Operated by the Historical Society of Glastonbury, 18th-century mansion house
Wethersfield Museum	Wethersfield	Hartford	History	website, operated by the Wethersfield Historical Society at the Keeney Memorial Cultural Center, also weekend tours of the Hurlbut-Dunham House and Cove Warehouse, a maritime museum on Wethersfield Cove, and Captain James Francis House, open by appointment
Wheeler House	Westport	Fairfield	Local history	Operated by the Westport Historical Society, Victorian period house with changing exhibits of local history and art, also Museum of Westport History
White Memorial Conservation Center	Litchfield	Litchfield	Natural history	Natural history museum, trails
Widener Gallery at the Austin Arts Center	Hartford	Hartford	Art	Part of Trinity College
William Benton Museum of Art	Storrs	Tolland	Art	Part of the University of Connecticut
Wilton Heritage Museum	Wilton	Fairfield	History	website, operated by the Wilton Historical Society, includes the 18th-century Sloan-Raymond-Fitch House and Betts-Sturges-Blackmar House with period rooms that reflect home life, the economy, furniture and decorations from 1740 to 1910
Windham Textile and History Museum	Willimantic	Windham	History	Its main focus is the American Thread Company's now-closed Willimantic mill
Windsor Historical Society Museum	Windsor	Hartford	History	website
Witch's Dungeon Classic Movie Museum	Bristol	Hartford	History	
Wolcott Historical Society Museum	Wolcott	New Haven	History	website
Wood Memorial Library	South Windsor	Hartford	Multiple	website, collections of Native American artifacts, mounted birds, 18th-century furniture, paintings, quilts
Woodstock Historical Society Museum	Woodstock	Windham	History	website
Yale Center for British Art	New Haven	New Haven	Art	
Yale University Art Gallery	New Haven	New Haven	Art	
Yale University Collection of Musical Instruments	New Haven	New Haven	Music	Musical instruments
Palestine Museum	Woodbridge	New Haven	History & Culture	website
Pequot Library	Southport	Fairfield	Special Collections	

== Defunct museums ==
- Bristol Military Memorial Museum, Bristol - collections now at the Bristol Historical Society
- Burndy Library - formerly in Norwalk, collection is now in The Huntington Library in San Marino, California and in the Smithsonian Institution in Washington, D.C.
- Children's Garbage Museum, Stratford - closed in 2011
- Connecticut Cellar Savers Fire Museum, Portland
- Connecticut Sports Museum & Hall of Fame - formerly located in the Hartford Civic Center, 2nd floor
- Day-Lewis Museum of Indian Artifacts, Farmington - owned by Yale University, formerly operated by the Farmington Historical Society, collection of Tunxis artifacts found on the grounds of the Lewis Walpole Library, closed in 2005
- Dequaine Museums, Meriden - included National Shaving & Barbershop Museum, Frank Chiarenza Museum of Glass, Rosa Ponselle Museum,
- Edward E. King Museum, East Hartford, information, collection of aviation and tobacco memorabilia, now spread throughout the East Hartford Public Library but not as a separate museum
- Farm Implement Museum, Bloomfield - was dedicated to the history of farming in New England and displayed farm tools dating from the 1790s
- Golden Age of Trucking Museum, Middlebury- antique trucks, carriages and collectibles, closed July, 2010; website
- Hartford Police Museum, Hartford - formerly located at 101 Pearl Street, confirmed closed by phone 2/12/08
- Hitchcock Museum, Riverton - collection of furnishings from the Hitchcock Chair Company, closed in 2003
- Holley-Williams House Museum, Lakeville - previously operated by the Salisbury Association, sold to private owner
- Horse Guard Cavalry Museum, Avon - museum is now just a case with uniforms
- Huntington House Museum, Windsor, closed in 2005, now private
- Kerosene Lamp Museum, Winchester
- Menczer Museum of Medicine and Dentistry, Hartford - operated by the Hartford Medical Society, closed in 2008, collections now at area hospitals and Tunxis Community College
- Museum of American Political Life, West Hartford - collection of political campaign memorabilia, formerly in the Harry Jack Gray Center at University of Hartford, closed in 2003
- National Purple Heart Museum, Enfield - proposed museum, never completed
- Nehemiah Royce House, Wallingford - now private
- Neil's American Dream Museum, West Hartford New York Times, "WEST HARTFORD JOURNAL; A Museum Enshrines a Simpler Era's Dreams", January 21, 1993
- New England Center for the Contemporary Arts, Brooklyn
- New England Muscle Bicycle Museum, Bloomfield
- Norwalk Museum, Norwalk - closed in 2012
- Nut Museum, Old Lyme
- Photomobile Model Museum, Woodstock - solar electric small-scale car, boat, plane, train and maglev vehicles
- Salisbury Cannon Museum, Lakeville - currently closed; Salisbury Cannon Museum website
- Skitch Henderson Museum, New Milford, formerly part of Hunt Hill Farm
- Somers Mountain Museum, Somers - collection of Native American and early settler tools
- Submarine Library and Museum, Middletown - closed in 2003, collection now in St. Marys Submarine Museum, St. Marys, Georgia
- Timexpo Museum, Waterbury, closed in 2015

== See also ==
- Aquaria: Category:Aquaria in Connecticut
- Botanical gardens: Category:Botanical gardens in Connecticut
- Historical societies: List of historical societies in Connecticut
- Libraries: Category:Libraries in Connecticut
- Nature centers: List of nature centers in Connecticut
- Observatories: Category:Astronomical observatories in Connecticut

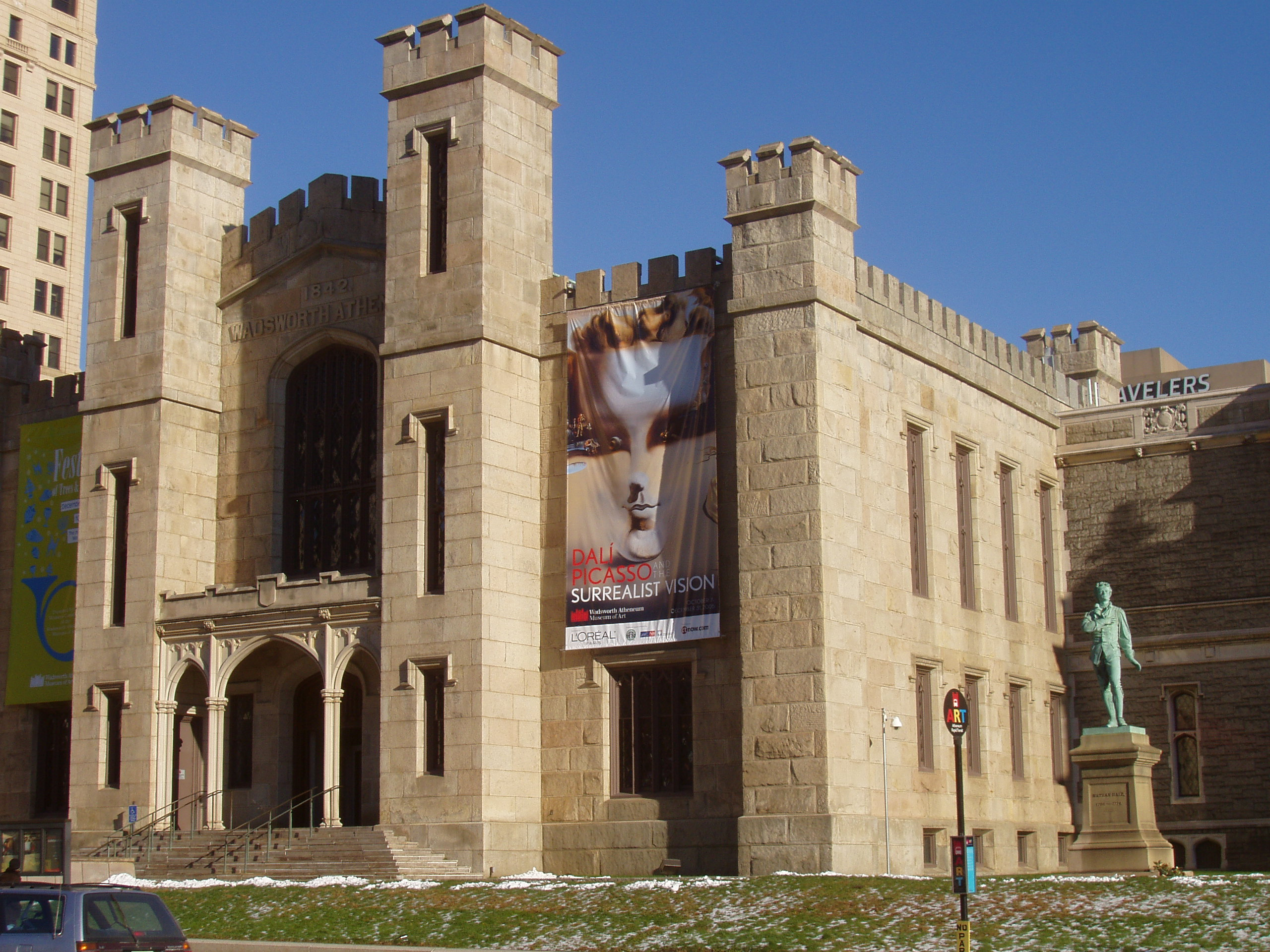
Wadsworth Atheneum in Hartford
