= Majdal Nateel =

Palestinian visual artist (born 1987)

- Nateel in 2026
- Born: 1987 (age 38–39); Saudi Arabia
- Education: Al-Aqsa University
- Known for: Installation art, painting
- Website: majdalnateel.com

Majdal Nateel (Arabic: مجدل نتيل; born 1987) is a Palestinian visual artist and painter. Her installations and paintings explore themes of war, siege, memory, and amputation, drawing on her experience of life in the Gaza Strip. She left Gaza in 2022 and lives in Sweden.

== Early life and education ==
Nateel was born in 1987 in Saudi Arabia to a Palestinian refugee family and grew up in Gaza. She received a Bachelor of Arts in fine art from Al-Aqsa University in Gaza in 2009.

== Career ==
Nateel had her first exhibition at the Shababeek for Contemporary Art space in Gaza. In her early works, Memory's Salt (2011) and The Impact of Light and Glass (2013), Nateel examined individual experience and its social reverberations. After the 2014 Gaza war her practice turned toward the human cost of recurring wars and the blockade of the Gaza Strip. Her 2014 installation If I Was Not There addressed children killed in Israeli bombardments, and her installation Without Coffins was shortlisted for the A. M. Qattan Foundation's "Young Artist of the Year Award" (YOYA), in 2014. Nateel's work, "Without coffins", was denied entry into the West Bank by the Israeli authorities, so a duplicate was made in Ramallah. She was shortlisted again in 2016 with The Dream Is Possible, a work on the concept of return, exhibited at Dar al Sa'a in Ramallah.

Between 2017 and 2019 she developed the Lane project, an imaginary corridor responding to the experience of being unable to travel beyond closed borders. In Studying the Voids of Amputation (2020–2021), based on research and interviews with survivors of the Great March of Return, she drew parallels between the loss of limbs and the loss of land and home. The artist Nadia Kaabi-Linke described these paintings as "a profound visual translation of loss and trauma".

Nateel participated in the Goethe-Institut programme After the Turn: Decolonial and Noncanonical Learning in Gaza, and in August 2021 began a 16-month residency at the Summer Academy of the Zentrum Paul Klee in Bern, hosted by the Bern Academy of the Arts.

In 2021 Nateel co-founded Dahaleez, a research art collective of Gaza-based artists and researchers. Works from Studying the Voids of Amputation were shown at the Clandestino festival in Gothenburg in 2024, and one of her paintings appears on the cover of Johannes Anyuru's book Faktan; her family home in northern Gaza, where several of her works were stored, was destroyed during the Gaza war.

== Exhibitions ==
In 2015, her work was part of an exhibition in the P21 Gallery, London, after the journalist Jon Snow helped her smuggled 399 of her paintings out of Gaza. Her work was shown in On Borrowed Time in Gaza: Art in Confinement at the Monica Reyes Gallery in Vancouver (2021), in the Amos Trust project On Location (2021), and in Freedom is One at the Museum of the Palestinian People in Washington, D.C. In 2026 she exhibited together with Salman Nawati in Sweden. In April 2026 she took part in Spotlight Gaza at the Medelhavsmuseet in Stockholm, organised with the International Cities of Refuge Network (ICORN) and Swedish PEN.
