= Museum of Connecticut Glass =

Coordinates: 41.79952°N 72.349109°W

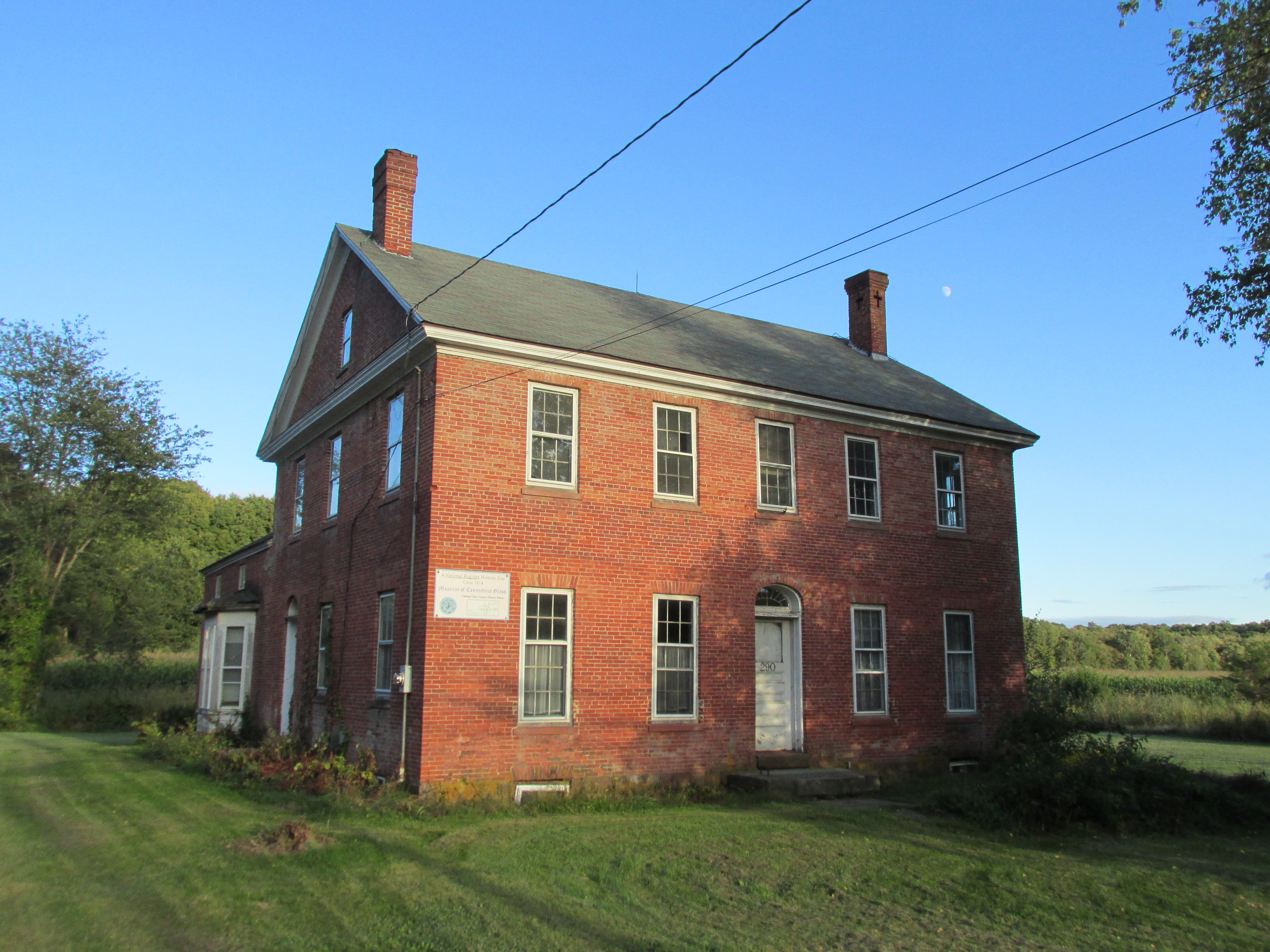
Museum of Connecticut Glass

The Museum of Connecticut Glass is a museum about 19th Century glass Coventry, Connecticut, founded on February 12, 1994. It is located in the Captain John Turner House (1813)

== Description ==
With its location in Coventry, one of its main focuses is the glassmaking industry in the town, which was prevalent and in business from approximately 1814–1848. The museum itself, and its location in the Capt. John Turner House is significant as its namesake was one of the first owners of the factory, the site of which still exists in the form of a foundation just up the road. The house itself is one of the last remaining sites on the National Historic Glass Factory District. There is currently an ongoing archeological excavation of shards from the original glasshouse being run by the museum in the cornfield directly next to the house, where deposited by one of the early owner's, Rufus Chamberlain in order to "sweeten, and aerate the soil".

There are many other glass factories as well that the museum studies, and preserves the history of. These include those such as the Pitkin Glassworks in modern-day Manchester, previously part of East Hartford, which was in business from 1783 to approximately 1830, the Mather Glassworks, also in what was once part of East Hartford which ran from 1806 until 1821, the West Willington Glass Co., in West Willington, which was in business from 1814 to 1872, the Glastonbury Glassworks, in Glastonbury which was running from 1816 until about 1827/1833, the New London Glassworks, in New London, which was in business from 1856 until after 1868, the Westford Glass Co., in Westford, which was running from 1857 to 1873, and the Meriden Flint Glass Co., in Meriden which was in business from 1876 to 1888.

The Museum is currently restoring the Turner House, and is also working on creating a solar-based glassmaking operation called “Sun-Fired Glass”, the first of its kind in the world.

== See also ==
- List of museums in Connecticut
