= Ezekiel Kelsey House =

Historic house in Connecticut, United States

- U.S. National Register of Historic Places
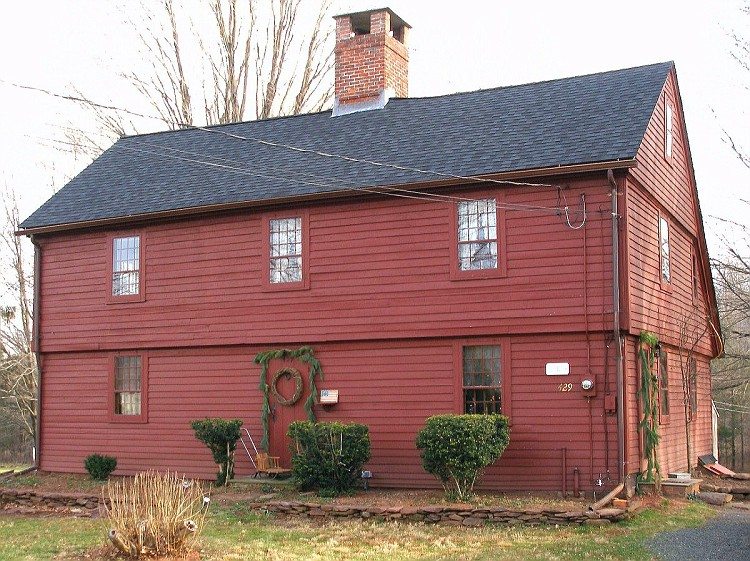

- Location within Connecticut Location within the United States
- Location: 429 Beckley Road; Berlin, Connecticut
- Coordinates: 41°37′38″N 72°43′25″W
- Area: 15 acres (6.1 ha)
- Built: 1750
- Architect: Ezekiel Kelsey
- Architectural style: Georgian
- NRHP reference No.: 77001410
- Added to NRHP: September 16, 1977

The Ezekiel Kelsey House is a historic house at 429 Beckley Road in Berlin, Connecticut. Built about 1760, it is a well-preserved example of a saltbox colonial residence. It was listed on the National Register of Historic Places in 1977.

== Description and history ==
The Ezekiel Kelsey House is located in a rural suburban setting in eastern Berlin, on the east side of Beckley Road north of Connecticut Route 9. It is a 2 1/2-story wood-frame structure, three large bays wide, with a large central chimney and a centered entry. It is one room deep, with a leanto section added to the rear, giving the house a saltbox appearance. The second story overhangs the first by several inches on three sides. The interior follows a typical center chimney plan, with parlor spaces on either side of the chimney, and the kitchen behind it. The left parlor is the finest room, with period wood paneling, cased timber framing, and carved trim elements. Paneling also appears in the other parlor and the kitchen; the latter room also has period cabinetry. A great deal of the house hardware is original, but some is old (period) replacement hardware salvaged from other buildings for restoration.

The house was probably built c. 1760 by Ezekiel Kelsey, who was the sixth of eleven children born to John Kelsey and Mary Buck. Ezekiel was born in Wethersfield in 1713 and died in 1795. The house may have been built by Ezekiel for his son Asahel, to whom he gave it in 1768. The house is more stylistically similar to houses built earlier in the 18th century in Connecticut than it is to many of its contemporaries.

The home of Ezekiel Kelsey's nephew Enoch also survives in Newington.

== See also ==
- National Register of Historic Places listings in Hartford County, Connecticut
