= Herbert Waide Hemphill Jr. =

American art collector

Herbert Waide "Bert" Hemphill Jr. (January 21, 1929 – May 8, 1998) was an American collector of folk art.

Hemphill was born in Atlantic City, New Jersey. His father, Herbert W. Hemphill, Sr., was a businessman who had made his fortune with a fleet of wicker rolling chairs on the Atlantic City boardwalk; his mother, Emma Bryant Bradley Hemphill, was the niece of William Clark Bradley. She died when her son was ten. She collected Dresden china, which fired in him his own interest in collecting. As a youth he accumulated marbles, stamps, duck decoys, puzzle jugs, and glass bottles. For a time he lived in Columbus, Georgia, where he attended the Wynnton School. Later he attended the Lawrenceville School and the Solebury School, where he evinced an interest in art and theater. In 1948 he spent time at Bard College working with Stefan Hirsch.

Hemphill moved to New York City in 1949 to begin a career as an artist, but he quickly found himself more at home with collecting. He began by acquiring African sculpture, moving to the field of modern European and American art, and ultimately came to focus on folk art, inspired by the example of such collectors as Abby Aldrich Rockefeller and Jean Lipman. In the early 1950s he focused on early American weathervanes, portraits, watercolors, and furniture, and in 1956 he purchased a pair of non-traditional cigar store Indians from an auction of the collection amassed by Rudolph Haffenreffer. His interest in Americana was heightened by reading the work of Jean Lipman. He was one of six founders, collectors and dealers, of the Museum of Early American Folk Art in 1961; the others were Adele Earnest, Cordelia Hamilton, Marian Willard, Burt Martinson, and Arthur Bullowa. The following year he co-organized its inaugural exhibition; he also donated a Flag Gate of c. 1876 as the first object in the permanent collection, and in 1964 he became the institution's first full-time curator, spending the following decade developing a slate of widely respected exhibitions and other programs.

In 1968 artists and collectors Michael and Julie Hall introduced Hemphill to Edgar Tolson, a meeting which he would later describe as an epiphany. Its result was that he began to consider purchasing the work of living folk artists for his own collection, which grew in its ethnic and national diversity. This culminated in the 1970 exhibition, "Twentieth-Century Folk Art", and the book Twentieth-Century Folk Art and Artists, co-authored with Julia Weissman, in 1974. Both would go on to influence several generations of collectors, dealers, curators, and critics in their attitudes towards folk art. Indeed, so influential was Hemphill that in 1982 he was named "Mr. American Folk Art" by Connoisseur magazine. Hemphill was noted to be unable to pass a display of unusual or noteworthy items without stopping to browse. Other collectors came to refer to the sort of work he championed as "Hemphill things", and it was sometimes said that he had a "360-degree eye". Artists represented in his collection of nearly 3,000 items included Martín Ramírez, Howard Finster, Jon Serl, Bessie Harvey, Sister Gertrude Morgan, and Joseph Yoakum.

Between 1973 and 1990 twenty-five American museums featured portions of Hemphill's collection on exhibit, and in 1976 some pieces were shown in Japan under the auspices of the American Bicentennial Commission. Starting in 1967 he began curating shows with Mary Black, and two years later he mounted his first independent show. An active trustee emeritus and member of the Collections Committee at the American Folk Art Museum, he was a regular donor to collections around the United States; most notably, between 1986 and 1998 more than six hundred works from his collection entered the holdings of the Smithsonian American Art Museum, which celebrated the acquisition with a 1990 exhibition and catalogue, Made with Passion: The Hemphill Folk Art Collection. In 1976 Hemphill organized the exhibition "Folk Sculpture USA" at the Brooklyn Museum; he consulted on a wide variety of exhibitions during his career, being named a guest curator at the Abby Aldrich Rockefeller Folk Art Museum in 1980. 1989 saw him become one of the founding members of the national advisory board of the Folk Art Society of America, a position he occupied until his death. In 1990 he received the Society's first annual Award of Distinction. In 1987 he received the James Smithson Society Founder medal from the Smithsonian Institution. He lectured widely, at such venues as the Smithsonian Institution and the Library of Congress as well as various universities.

Hemphill died of heart failure in New York City. Two of his own artworks reside in the collection of the Smithsonian American Art Museum, a Portrait of Hermine Katz, Atlantic City, of 1949 and a Chandelier of unknown date. Also in the collection is a 1978 portrait of Hemphill by Howard Finster, THE HERBERT WADE HEMPHILL J.R. COLLECTION FOUNDER OF AMERICAN FOLK ART THE MAN WHO PRESERVES THE LONE AND FORGOTTEN. THE UNKNOWN COLLECTION, whose title is taken in part from the Folk Art Society's statement upon awarding him the Award of Distinction, in which he was described as "the man who preserves the lone and forgotten". Another portrait of Hemphill, by Malcah Zeldis and dated 1990, is in the collection of the Abby Aldrich Rockefeller Folk Art Museum.
