= Connecticut Trolley Museum =

Coordinates: 41°55′53″N 72°35′41″W

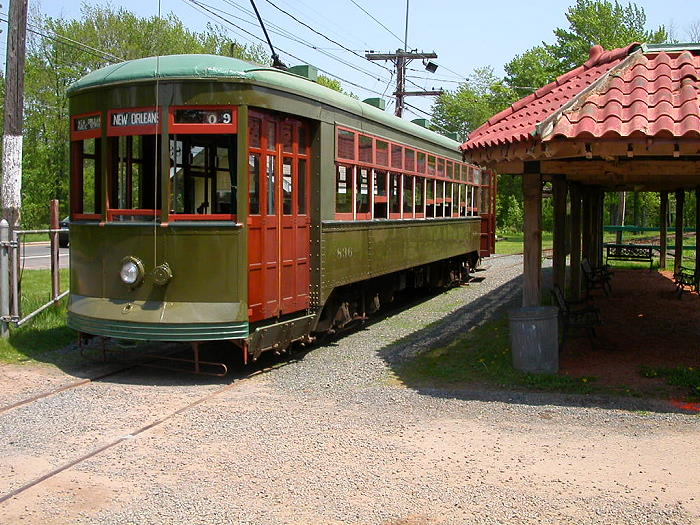
- A New Orleans streetcar stops at the Isle of Safety (originally at State Street, Hartford).
- Established: 1940
- Location: 58 North Road; East Windsor, Connecticut
- Type: Railroad museum
- Website: ct-trolley.org

The Connecticut Trolley Museum, also known as the Warehouse Point Trolley Museum, is the oldest incorporated museum dedicated to electric railroading in the United States. Founded in October 1940, the museum is located in East Windsor, Connecticut and is open to the public February through December. The museum features static and moving displays, and self-guided tours of the state's trolley history.

Also located on the same property is the Connecticut Fire Museum which exhibits antique fire apparatus and motor coaches.

== Heritage Railroad ==
The museum operates a 1.5 mile (2.4 km) heritage railroad over the original right-of-way of the Hartford and Springfield Street Railway Company's Rockville Branch. The Rockville Branch started at the Main Fish Market, and ran 17.5 miles (28.2 km) to Rockville, Connecticut. The branch line saw factory workers, tourists, and high school students. The interurban cars were more direct, and could hold more people than the few buses of the time. The line also serviced Piney Ridge, an amusement park located just between Broad Brook and East Windsor. Most trolley companies built parks—like Piney Ridge—to create revenue on the one day no one went to work, Sunday. Piney Ridge featured a large pipe organ, a dance floor on trolley springs, and a baseball field. The dance floor with trolley springs allowed people to ease their knees as they danced the night away. The baseball field hosted games to two major players, Babe Ruth, and Lou Gehrig. When the Hartford and Springfield faced financial debts, the company went out of business. Their streetcars were brought to Piney Ridge and scrapped. By 1926, the track was gone, and the Rockville Branch with it.

It would be 14 years until the Connecticut Electric Railway Association was formed and began restoring service on the line. Unlimited rides on cars are included in the admission for the day. A minimum of two different cars are run each day. Many times up to three or four cars will be rotated through during the day, giving visitors an opportunity to experience many different types of streetcars and interurbans.

== Collection ==
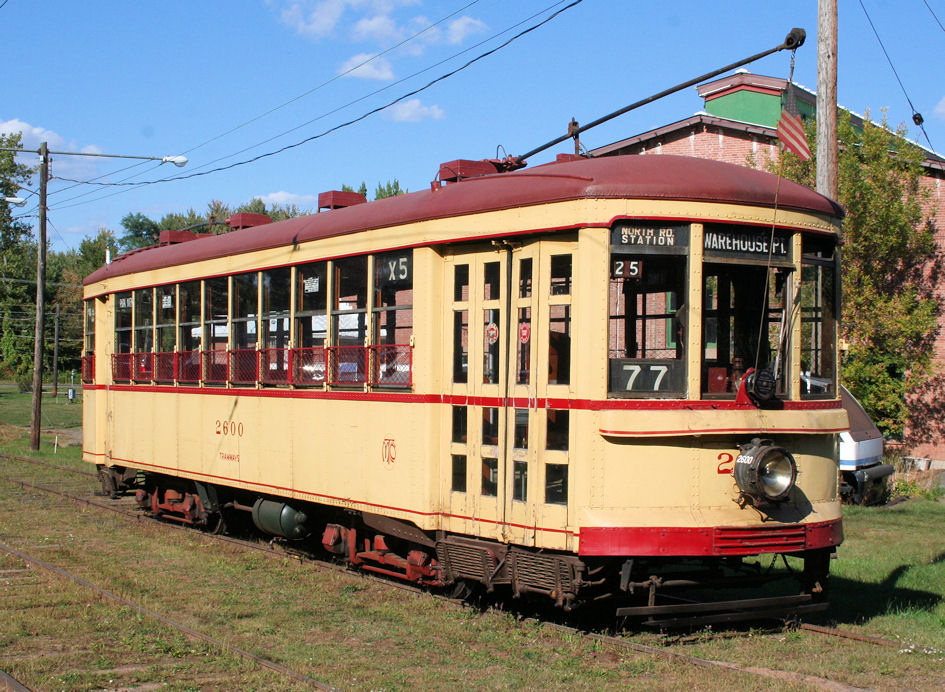
A 1929 Canadian Car & Foundry double truck (Montreal Tramways 2600)

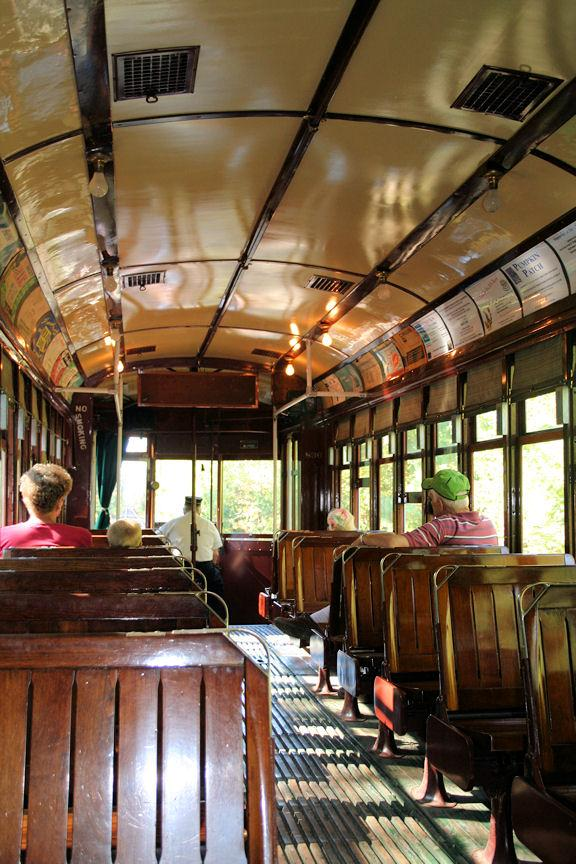
A trolley's interior

The museum has a diverse collection of equipment to help tell the story of the trolley era and its impact on society. Most of the equipment is stored in one of four car barns, the Visitor Center, or the car shop. Although, there exists an outdoor storage track that is next to the car shop, it goes quite far into the woods.

The Connecticut Trolley Museum has one or more of the following cars operating for the public when the museum is open:

- Montreal Tramways sightseeing car 4
- Springfield Terminal combine car 16
- New Orleans Public Service closed car 836
- Fair Haven and Westville Railroad open air car 355
- Boston Elevated Railway Type 5 car 5645
- Connecticut Company closed car 1326

In addition, the museum is currently working on the following cars in the restoration shop:

- Connecticut Company Birney Safety car (double truck) 3001
- Nassau (New York) Electric Railway car 169
- Oshawa Railway steeplecab 18
- Iowa Southern Utilities Co. line car 1
- Northern Ohio Traction & Light Co executive car 1500
- Boston Elevated Railway PCC 3100
- New Jersey Transit PCC 15 (Cosmetic restoration)

The Main Hall of the Visitor Center is set up with an exhibit detailing the progression of the era and its impact on society. The following cars are on display in the Visitor Center:

- Northern Ohio Traction and Light parlor car 1500
- Springfield Electric Railway combine car 10
- Five Mile Beach Electric Railway car 36
- Ponemah Mills Locomotive 1386
- Shaker Heights Rapid Transit car 1201

The museum took delivery of a Canadian National Class Z-1-a electric locomotive in 1996, funded by an anonymous donation. The locomotive was transferred to the Halton County Radial Railway in 2023.

== See also ==
- Shore Line Trolley Museum in East Haven, Connecticut
- List of museums in Connecticut
