= Mary Allis =

American dealer of art and antiques (1899–1987)

Mary Allis (March 2, 1899 – May 8, 1987) was an American dealer of art and antiques.

Allis was born into a Cleveland family of modest means, and moved to New York in 1929 to begin a career in the field of interior design. In the mid-1940s she opened an antiques store in central Southport, Connecticut. At around the same time she began the restoration of the David Ogden House in Fairfield, ultimately turning it into a showcase for eighteenth- and early nineteenth-century American folk paintings and furniture. She became an influential guide to many important collectors, such as Stewart Gregory. Allis gained recognition in 1958 when she purchased the collection of folk art assembled by William J. and Marion Raymond Gunn of Newtonville, Massachusetts. Of the 630 pieces, many of them folk portraits, in the collection, around 150 were purchased by Stephen Clark for the New York State Historical Association; the remainder went to other institutions and private collectors. The Colonial Williamsburg Foundation is among the institutions which purchased work from Allis.

Once described as the "doyenne of folk-art dealers" and the "first lady of folk art", Allis was highly regarded among other dealers during her career. She died in Fairfield.
