= Sari Ibrahim Khoury =

Palestinian artist (1941–1997)

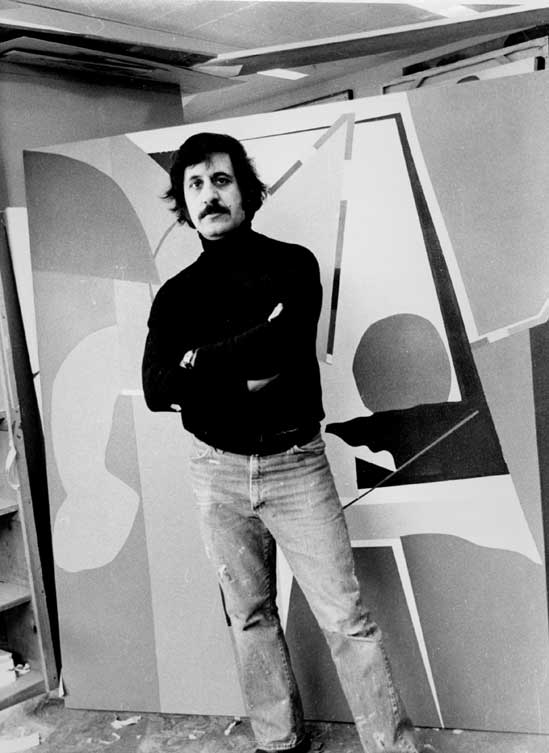
- Khoury in 1975
- Born: March 13, 1941; Jerusalem, Mandate Palestine
- Died: June 18, 1997 (aged 56); Detroit, Michigan, US
- Education: Cranbrook Academy of Art
- Known for: Painting, Drawing
- Movement: Abstract expressionism

Sari Ibrahim Khoury (March 13, 1941 – June 18, 1997, Arabic: سري خوري) was a Palestinian-American visual artist. He primarily worked in abstract modes in acrylic, oil and charcoal.

== Early life ==
Sari Ibrahim Khoury was born in Jerusalem, Mandate Palestine in 1941. Years after becoming a refugee in 1948 and his family's eviction from Jerusalem, he emigrated to the United States to attend school.

== Emigration to the United States ==
After spending the remainder of his time in Palestine in Bir Zeit, Khoury came to the United States at age 17 on a fine arts scholarship to Ohio Wesleyan University. There, he earned a Bachelor of Arts and completed his Master of Fine Arts at Cranbrook Academy of Art in Detroit. He married his wife, Suheila Ghannam, in 1967. Together, they had three sons.

== Career and exhibitions ==
Khoury began his academic career as professor of fine art at Berea College, KY and subsequently at Central Michigan University in Mt. Pleasant, MI. He taught painting and drawing for 31 years.

Khoury began teaching at Central Michigan University in the Art Department in 1967. He served as chairperson of the department from 1992 to 1993. On July 21, 2001, the board of trustees of Central Michigan University recognized posthumously that Khoury be promoted to professor emeritus rank.

His works have been exhibited in the United States, Europe, Japan, and in Palestine.

His exhibition roster includes fifteen solo exhibits, some posthumous, and over forty group exhibits.

A major commissioned mural sits at the Arab Community Center for Economic and Social Services in Dearborn, MI highlighting the accomplishments and contributions of Arab Americans.

In 2008, the Arab American National Museum opened a major retrospective of his work.

Shortly after, Birzeit University Virtual Gallery also created an online retrospective.

In 2019, the newly opened Museum of the Palestinian People in Washington DC houses a painting and drawing in its collection.

In 2024, two paintings traveled to Venice Italy as part of an exhibit of Palestinian artists titled Foreigners in their own land, organized by the Palestine Museum US.

== Museums and Collections ==
Khoury's work can be found today at the Arab American National Museum in Dearborn, Michigan and the Museum of the Palestinian People in Washington, DC.

Birzeit University's Museum holds two pieces of his work in their collection.

As of 2025, Eli and Edythe Broad Art Museum on the campus of Michigan State University in East Lansing, MI has two of Khoury's works on display.

== Public involvement ==
Khoury was an active participant in Arab-American life in Michigan. He frequently spoke and wrote articulately against war and on Palestinian justice. Many of his writings, photos and other archival material are held at the Bentley Historical Library at the University of Michigan. They form part of a historical collection on Arab, Muslim, and Assyrian Americans in Michigan. In 1987, Khoury was commissioned by the Arab Community Center for Economic and Social Services (ACCESS) to paint a mural depicting Arab-American life, social, professional and cultural contributions to Michigan. It is housed and displayed in the renovated ACCESS office in Dearborn, Michigan.

== Style ==
The Palestinian artist and historian, Samia Halaby referred to the moment when she first discovered Khoury's works, through personal correspondence:

I was excited to see the flavors of Arabic calligraphy in his work co-existing with the radical formal qualities of twentieth century abstraction.

Khoury references the works of modern artists Paul Klee, Ben Nicholson, Arshile Gorky, and Wassily Kandinsky as sources of inspiration.
