= David Ogden House =

Historic house in Connecticut, United States

- U.S. National Register of Historic Places
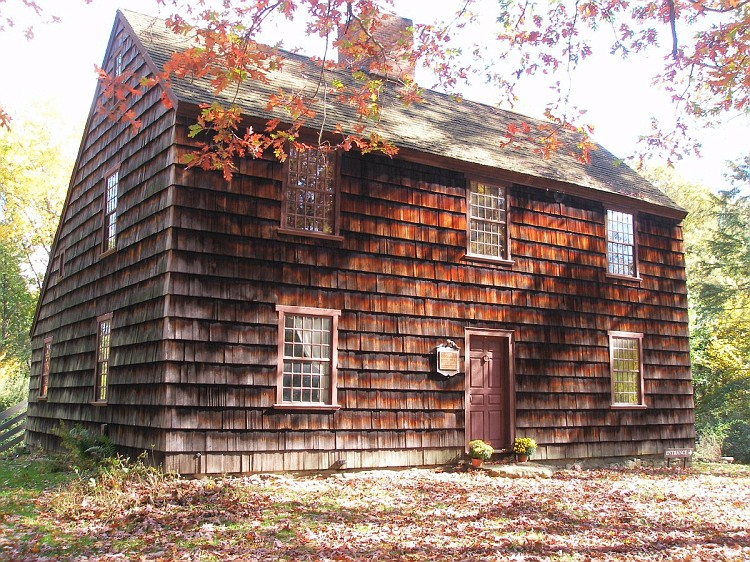
- David Ogden House 1938

- Location within Connecticut Location within the United States
- Location: 1520 Bronson Road, Fairfield, Connecticut
- Coordinates: 41°9′33″N 73°16′37″W
- Built: 1750
- Architectural style: Saltbox
- NRHP reference No.: 79002651
- Added to NRHP: August 17, 1979

The David Ogden House is a historic house at 1520 Bronson Road in Fairfield, Connecticut. It was built in 1750 as an integral saltbox. The house is an exceptional survivor of a typical mid-18th century Connecticut farmhouse. There is a large central field stone chimney topped with brick. The house, which escaped the burning of Fairfield by the British forces that invaded during the American Revolution, provides a glimpse into the life of a typical family. The house was called the new house in a 1750 deed. It is believed that the house was built for David Ogden at the time of his marriage to Jane Sturges. For the next 125 years it was home for the Ogden family in this farming and coastal shipping town. The house fell into disrepair and was donated to the Fairfield Historical Society. Presently, the house serves as a museum for the Fairfield Historical Society, which also operates the Fairfield Museum and History Center.

At one time the Ogden House was owned by art and antiques dealer Mary Allis, who turned it into a showcase for eighteenth- and early nineteenth-century American folk paintings and furniture.

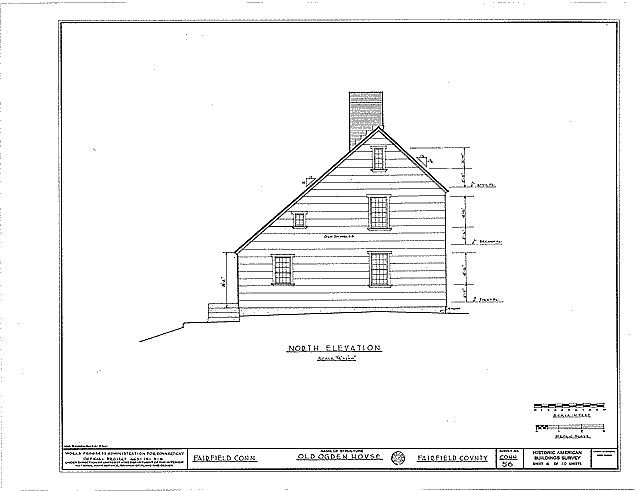
Side elevation

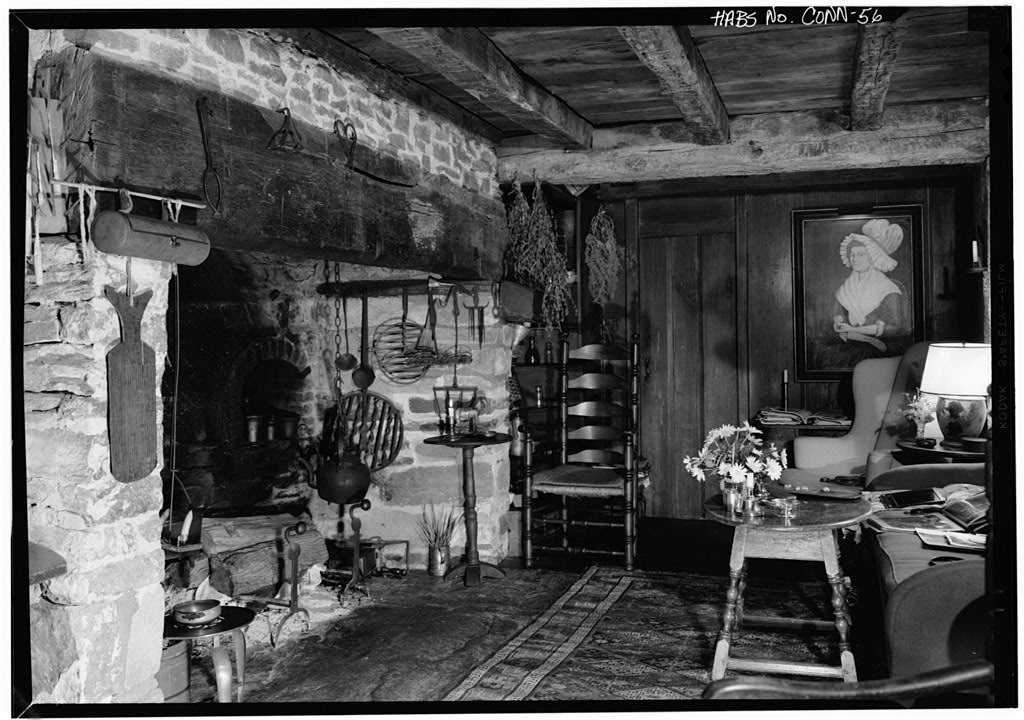
East Room first floor

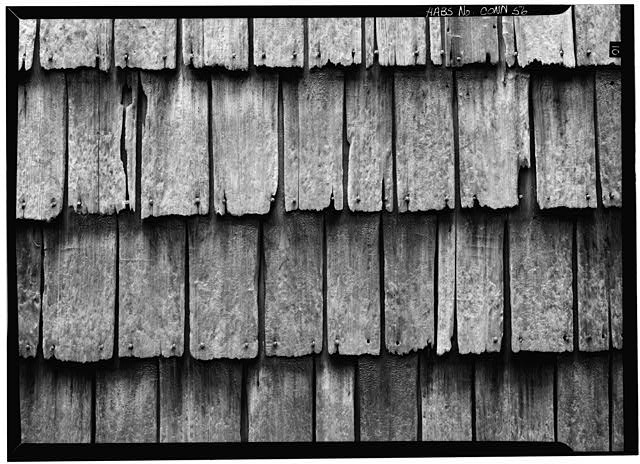
Original shingles north wall

== See also ==
- National Register of Historic Places listings in Fairfield County, Connecticut
