= Malcah Zeldis =

American folk painter (born 1931)

- Born: Mildred Brightman; September 22, 1931 (age 94); Bronx, New York
- Known for: Painting
- Movement: Folk Art

Malcah Zeldis (born Mildred Brightman; September 22, 1931) is an American folk painter. She is known for work that draws from a mix of biblical, historical, and autobiographical themes.

== Life and career ==
=== Early life ===
Malcah Zeldis was born in the Bronx, New York, and raised in a Jewish neighborhood in Detroit, Michigan. Her father faced work discrimination for his religion and the family was poor, but eventually moved to a middle-class neighborhood. However, Zeldis looks back on her years in Detroit fondly, stating that what she remembers best is the nature. She also remembers weekend visits to the Detroit Institute of Arts where she recalls being taken by brightly colored Flemish paintings full of small figures. These paintings would later inspire her colorful works with many small figures.

=== Israel ===
As a non-devout Jew, Zeldis felt disconnected from her people and wanted to explore her heritage. She moved to Israel in 1949 at the age of eighteen, becoming a Zionist and working on a kibbutz. It was here that Zeldis met her future husband, Hiram Zeldis. The two went back to the US to marry, and then returned to the kibbutz. Zeldis began painting, yet had little confidence in the quality of her work. However, Aaron Giladi, a well known Israeli artist visited the kibbutz and praised Zeldis’s paintings. Zeldis was overwhelmed by his regard and his request for two paintings, saying, "I lost my voice from excitement—I couldn’t go to his lecture I was so emotionally upset. I heard afterwards that he said I was a great artist". Giladi’s compliments came with constructive criticism; his suggestion to paint larger intimidated Zeldis. After trying and failing to use larger canvases she stopped painting for a period of time, which was extended by childbirth and a permanent move to Brooklyn, New York.

=== Brooklyn ===
Zeldis finally resumed painting twenty-three years later, as her children grew older and her marriage ended. She enrolled in Brooklyn College as an Early Childhood Studies major in 1970. The college had a "life experience" policy, which prompted Zeldis to submit her paintings despite continued apprehension over whether they were good enough. Much to her surprise, Zeldis's paintings were well received and her teacher introduced her work to an art critic, who further suggested showing her work to dealers. This period was a turning point for Zeldis, as she realized that her lack of training was not a barrier to the art world. It was around this time that she observed Haitian folk art in a gallery. She found Haitian folk art very stylistically similar to her own, and finally believed that she was an artist. Zeldis began painting seriously and had a number of gallery shows. Her work also appeared in books such as the International Dictionary of Naive Art and Moments in Jewish Life: The Folk Art of Malcah Zeldis. Zeldis later illustrated a number of children's books in collaboration with her daughter, Yona Zeldis.

== Painting style ==
Zeldis's paintings are generally flat, lacking proportion, and brightly colored with busy compositions featuring crisply defined figures. Critics describe her colors as being explosive. Zeldis's works include everyday objects that ground the viewers in reality, yet include surprising subjects such as presidents, leading ladies, and biblical characters. Her whimsical images contain a number of storytelling devices and attempt to convey a narrative. After recovering from cancer in 1986, Zeldis was too weak to lift the masonite boards she regularly used, and instead painted on corrugated cardboard found in the street.

== Children's book illustration ==
Malcah Zeldis collaborated with her daughter, Yona Zeldis, to write and illustrate a number of children's books. Yona says, "The collaboration I really owe to her. She really wanted to do a children's book with me, and I said, 'No no no no no, I can't do that,' and she said, 'Yes you can.' She persisted and in effect brought me a contract." Zeldis and her daughter have written and illustrated Eve and Her Sisters: Women of the Old Testament, God Sent a Rainbow and Other Bible Stories, Anne Frank, Sisters in Strength: American Women Who Made a Difference, and Hammerin' Hank. Malcah Zeldis has also illustrated Honest Abe and Martin Luther King.

== Selected works ==
- Miss Liberty Celebration, 1987, oil on corrugated cardboard, 54 1/2 x 36 1/2 in. (138.4 x 92.7 cm), Smithsonian American Art Museum, Gift of Herbert Waide Hemphill, Jr.
- Nude on a Couch, 1973, oil on masonite, 39.5 by 57.5 inches (100 cm × 146 cm), American Folk Art Museum, gift of Marilyn Grais.
- Pieta, 1973, oil on fiberboard, 26 x 22 in. (66.0 x 55.9 cm.), Smithsonian American Art Museum, Gift of Herbert Waide Hemphill, Jr. and museum purchase made possible by Ralph Cross Johnson
- Wake, 1974, oil on panel, 23 1/2 x 31 7/8 in. (59.7 x 81.0 cm.), Smithsonian American Art Museum, Gift of David L. Davies
- Miss America Beauty Pageant, 1973, oil on masonite, 48 x 40 in. (121.9 x 101.6 cm.), Smithsonian American Art Museum, Gift of Herbert Waide Hemphill, Jr.
- In Shul, 1986, Oil on Masonite, 30.5 by 25.25 inches (77.5 cm × 64.1 cm), American Folk Art Museum, gift of the artist, dedicated to the memory of her father, Morris Brightman.
