= Adele Earnest =

American art collector and historian (1901–1993)

- Born: 1901
- Died: 1993 (aged 91–92)
- Education: Wellesley College
- Occupation: Art collector
- Spouse: Joel Earnest
- Children: 1

Adele Earnest (1901–1993) was an American folk art collector and historian, noted as an authority on wildfowl decoys.

== Early life ==
Earnest was born in Waltham, Massachusetts, and attended Wellesley College. As a young woman, newly married, she lived for a time in Pennsylvania German country, an experience to which she ascribed her interest in folk art.

== Art collection ==
She worked for a time as Eva LaGalliene's stage manager before moving to Stony Point, New York, where with Cordelia Hamilton, she opened the Stony Point Folk Art Gallery in 1948. The gallery soon became known for its displays of folk sculpture, of which decoys were a particular highlight. Growing from this interest, Earnest in 1965 published The Art of the Decoy: American Bird Carving, among the first books to discuss decoys in a scholarly context.

Alongside Hamilton, Marian Willard, Burt Martinson, Albert Bullowa, and Herbert Waide Hemphill, Jr., she was a founding trustee of the American Folk Art Museum. Instrumental in supporting many of its early programs, she donated numerous works to the collection, including a pair of decoys by Lothrop T. Holmes; also among her gifts was a weathervane depicting the Archangel Gabriel which went on to become a symbol of the institution.

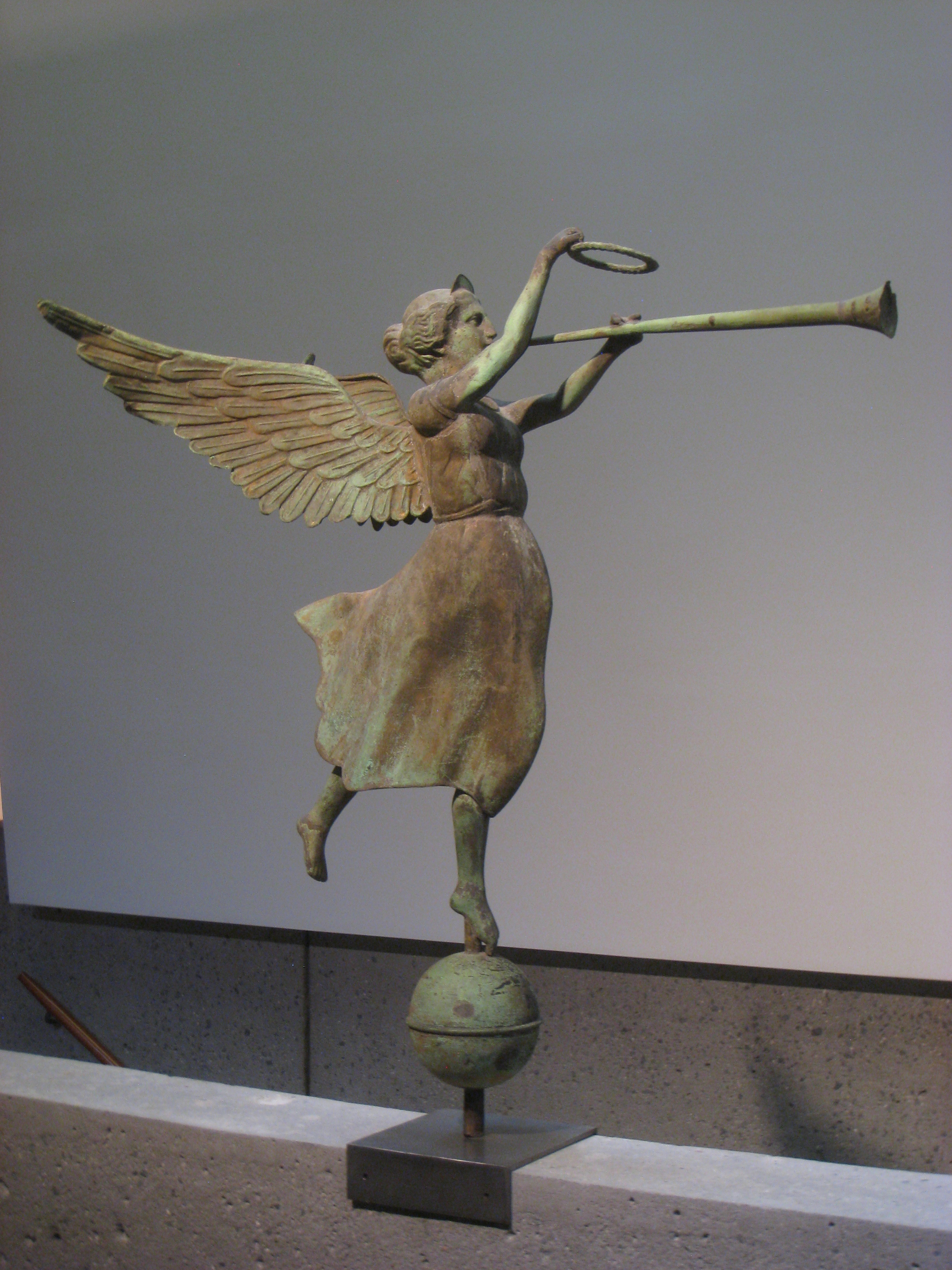
Weathervane - American Folk Art Museum, NYC - IMG 5873

In 1984 she published a combination memoir-history of the field of folk art collecting, Folk Art in America: A Personal View. Earnest traced her interest in the art of decoys to a set of three carvings of dovetailed geese which she purchased in 1954; two of these she sold to Stewart Gregory, and one has since been dubbed the Earnest-Gregory dovetailed goose.

== Death ==
She died in a nursing home in Mount Vernon, Washington. She was survived by her son, Eugene, and two grandchildren, her husband Joel having died many years before. Earnest's papers are held in the archives of the American Folk Art Museum.
