= Stewart Gregory =

American collector of folk art

Stewart E. Gregory (1913–1976) was an American collector of folk art.

Gregory was descended from a family which had lived in Wilton, Connecticut, for many generations. His interest in collecting antiques was sparked by his 1944 purchase of a Guarneri cello. He received a bachelor's degree from Princeton University in 1936, graduating from Harvard Law School in 1939. By trade he worked in the field of pharmaceuticals, retiring at the age of fifty. In building his collection, Gregory worked closely with Mary Allis, from whom he purchased numerous pieces; he also purchase work from Adele Earnest; the Earnest-Gregory Dovetailed Goose, a decoy which both collectors owned, now bears their name. Eventually his collection came to contain, in addition to decoys, weathervanes, hooked rugs, tinware, watercolors, and other items, among them portraits by John Brewster Jr., Erastus Salisbury Field, and Ammi Phillips. Chairman of the Wilton Historical Society, Gregory converted an eighteenth-century barn into a home where he could show off his pieces. He also collected memorabilia related to the American Civil War. A vice president and trustee of the American Folk Art Museum from 1964, in 1972 the museum exhibited his collection in the exhibit "An Eye on America: Folk Art from the Stewart E. Gregory Collection". After his death, in 1979, Gregory's collection was dispersed at auction, a moment that has been called a watershed in the field of American folk art collecting because of the prices realized and the interest engendered. Many of his pieces are currently in major American museum collections.
