= Garbage Museum =

Waste management themed museum in Stratford, Connecticut

The Garbage Museum
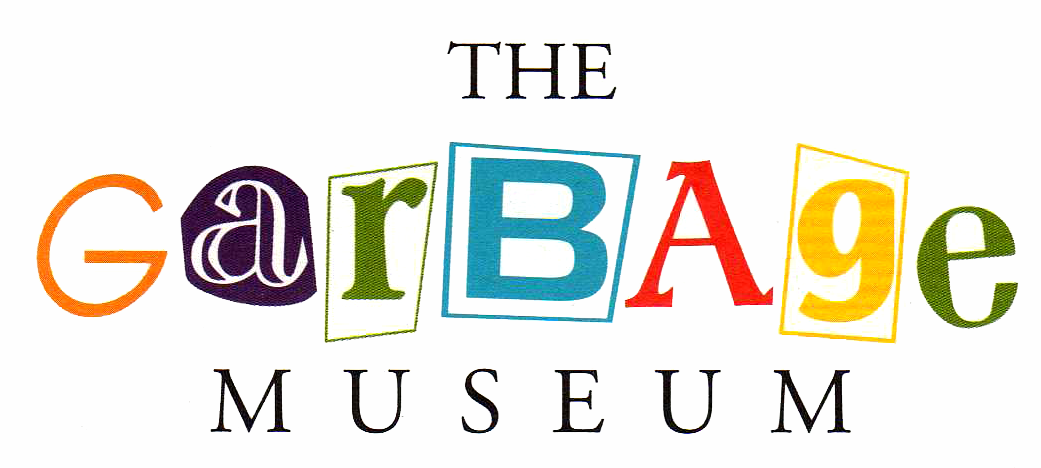
- Logo for the Garbage Museum
- Established: 1993
- Dissolved: Closed August 25, 2011
- Location: 1410 Honeyspot Road Extension, Stratford, Connecticut
- Visitors: 32,200 in 2008

The Garbage Museum was a waste management themed museum in Stratford, Connecticut, United States. Constructed and opened in 1994, the recycling facility and museum was constructed for a cost of US$5 million and funded through a group of 19 local municipalities, collectively known as the Southwest Connecticut Recycling Committee. The museum was operated by the Connecticut Resources Recovery Authority which focused on empowering visitors with knowledge about waste management and allowed visitors to watch the sorting process of recyclables. The most iconic exhibit was Trash-o-saurus, a dinosaur sculpture made of garbage. Funding for the museum dropped in 2009 due to expiring contracts; the museum was closed in 2011 following a failed fundraising campaign. In 2014, the Connecticut General Assembly approved a measure to fund the museum by allowing the Connecticut Department of Energy and Environmental Protection to award a grant of up to $100,000 to the Connecticut Resource Recovery Authority.

== Operation ==
The recycling facility and museum was constructed for a cost of $5 million and opened in 1993. Funding for the museum was provided through a group of 19 local municipalities, known as the Southwest Connecticut Recycling Committee, which transported recyclables to the facility for processing. The museum was part of an active recycling operation that allows visitors to follow the recyclable materials through the sorting processes to the crushing and baling process before they are shipped to processors to be recycled into new products. The museum was overseen and operated by the Connecticut Resources Recovery Authority.

== Exhibits ==
The museum's goal was to empower its visitors to make good choices and be knowledgeable about waste management in the midst of a "waste crisis". The center director of the museum, Valerie Knight-Di-Gangi said, "We've created exhibits that encourage children to explore serious environmental issues, and do so in a fun way to have lasting impact and empower them to take responsibility for the environment." The museum was operated by the Southwest Connecticut Regional Recycling Operating Committee which staffed the museum with "educational specialists who design[ed] and conduct[ed] the educational programs".

The Garbage Museum was an operating recycling facility and featured a viewing area for the operation which processes around 60,000 tons of recyclables from 20 local towns. Educational exhibits focused on the benefits of recycling drink cans and mining bauxite, the main source of aluminum, and reducing air pollution and water pollution. Another exhibit features a walk-through tunnel depicting a compost pile. Interactive exhibits included a general store and a "Trash Bash" activity in which "imprison[ed] helmet-wearing contestants ... answer questions. If the answer is wrong, others are given the green light to dump trash on them from an overhead opening." There were also art exhibits made from recyclable material including a "life-size mannequin made from crushed and colored milk containers strung together with pipe cleaners". In 2004, a new exhibit showcasing the trash-to-energy process was created by Mike Blasavage as part of a project funded by the Connecticut Resources Recovery Authority. The exhibit follows trash, represented as marbles, being transferred from bins to toy trucks, the trucks transfers the trash to the energy plant that generates energy to open and close a drawbridge.

A popular and unique exhibit was Trash-o-saurus, a 12 feet (3.7 m) tall and 24 feet (7.3 m) long dinosaur made out of junk that was prominently on display in the Garbage Museum. The one-ton sculpture was created by Leo Sewell of Pennsylvania and made of "no parking" signs, cell phones, license plates, and other materials. The sculpture represents the average amount of garbage and recyclables that a person in Connecticut discards each year. The exhibit was focused on the importance of recycling and had an interactive checklist of items to find the comprise the sculpture. In April 2011, the museum celebrated the 16th birthday of the Trash-o-saurus with a birthday party.

== Closure ==
The museum began fundraising efforts and started collecting $2 for entrance fees in September 2008. The United States Internal Revenue Service ruled that museum donations could be tax-deductible, increasing opportunities for fundraising. The Connecticut Resources Recovery Authority also applied for federal funding as a "shovel ready" project to upgrade and automate the recycling center's operations. In 2009, the fate of the Garbage Museum became uncertain due to financial problems when the recycling plant's contracts expired on June 30, and commodity prices dropped due to the 2008 financial crisis; Nonnenmacher stated that the museum's operating costs were between $200,000 and $250,000 per year. Interest in the museum also came from a group of East Haven High School students who produced a short documentary video about the Garbage Museum which won a state award and attracted some international interest.

Prior to its close in 2011, the operating budget was $341,000, which funded staffing, educational programs, and the museum's heating and lighting. In July 2011, Milford's Board of Aldermen approved allocating $26,000 via a $0.75 tax per ton of municipal solid waste, the latest addition to a $100,000 fundraising drive. On August 25, 2011, the Connecticut Resources Recovery Authority Board of Directors voted to close the Garbage immediately. In 2013, Connecticut State Senator Kevin C. Kelly introduced legislation to reopen the museum, but the amendment failed to garner support. In 2014, the Connecticut General Assembly approved a measure to fund the museum by allowing the Connecticut Department of Energy and Environmental Protection to award a grant of up to $100,000 to the Connecticut Resource Recovery Authority via funding of the Municipal Tipping Fee Fund.
