= Palestine Museum US =

Museum in Woodbridge, Connecticut

- Established: 22 April 2018
- Location: 1764 Litchfield Turnpike; Woodbridge, CT 06525
- Coordinates: 41.3465°N 72.9820°W
- Founder: Faisal Saleh
- Website: www.palestinemuseum.us

The Palestine Museum US is a museum in Woodbridge, Connecticut, featuring the history, art, and culture of Palestinians. It is the first Palestinian-themed museum in the United States and the first in the Americas. The museum was founded in 2018 by Palestinian American businessman Faisal Saleh, who owns the property. It includes a library of Palestinian literature.

All museum visits are by appointment only.

== Scotland branch ==
In May 2025, a second branch of The Palestine Museum was opened in Edinburgh, Scotland.

== See also ==
- Museum of the Palestinian People
- The Palestinian Museum
