= Enoch Kelsey House =

Historic house in Connecticut, United States

- U.S. National Register of Historic Places
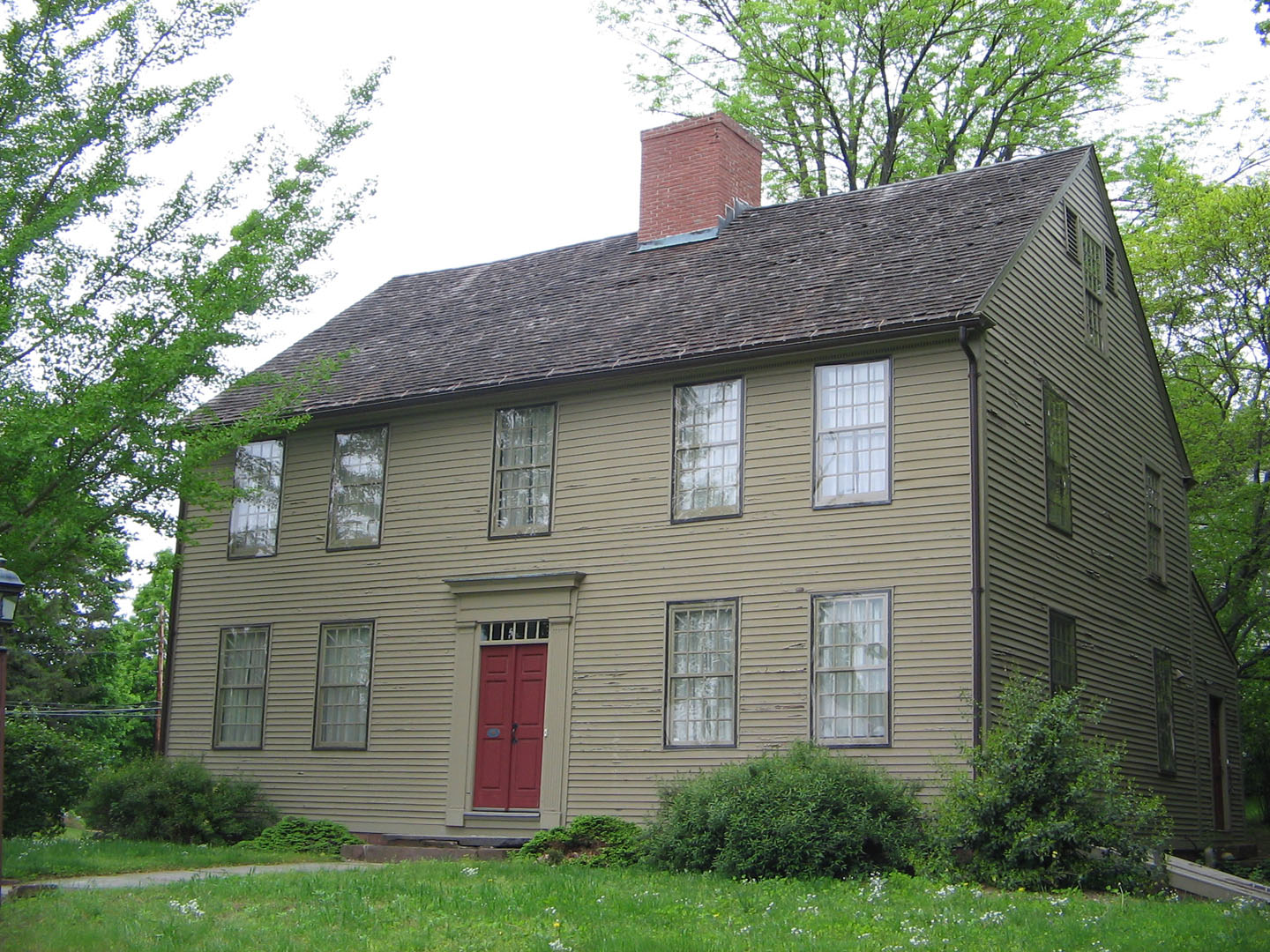

- Location within Connecticut Location within the United States
- Location: 1702 Main Street; Newington, Connecticut
- Coordinates: 41°41′7″N 72°43′17″W
- Area: less than one acre
- Built: 1799
- NRHP reference No.: 82004437
- Added to NRHP: June 28, 1982

The Enoch Kelsey House is a historic house museum at 1702 Main Street in Newington, Connecticut. Built about 1799, it is a well-preserved example Federal period residential architecture. Originally located near the New Britain line, it was moved to its present site in 1979 to save it from demolition. It was listed on the National Register of Historic Places in 1982.

== Description and history ==
The Enoch Kelsey House stands about 0.5 miles (0.80 km) south of Newington center, facing south onto Copper Beech Lane at its junction with Main Street. It is a 2 1/2-story wood-frame structure, with a gabled roof, central chimney, and clapboarded exterior. Its main facade is five bays wide, with a center entrance flanked by pilasters and topped by a transom window and a corniced entablature.

The house was built by Enoch Kelsey and his son, David Kelsey, probably c. 1799. Enoch was a farmer and tinsmith. Enoch was born August 12, 1717, in Wethersfield, Connecticut. He married Mary Bidwell, and together they had twelve children. David was his second, born in 1760. The house was originally located on the western end of Kelsey Street, across from Christian Lane. The home features rare, freehand painted wall decorations, basement to attic paneling, a beehive oven and fireplaces.

In 1979 the house was scheduled for demolition, and the Newington Historical Society gained permission to first go inside and inspect some of the artwork that was rumored to be inside. When the volunteers entered the house and found the artwork, they began fundraising in order to perform the renovations needed to make the building into a museum. The house was moved to its current location at the intersection of Main Street and Copper Beech Road. It is now a historic house museum run by the Newington Historical Society. It is open to the public May–September on the first Sunday of every month.

The home of Enoch's brother Ezekiel Kelsey is also a historic home in Berlin, Connecticut.

== See also ==
- National Register of Historic Places listings in Hartford County, Connecticut
