= Institute For American Indian Studies =

Archive organization in Connecticut, U.S.

Coordinates: 41.6097°N 73.32467°W

Institute For American Indian Studies (IAIS) is a museum and research center in Washington, Connecticut. It is dedicated to preserving and sharing the culture and history of Native American peoples, particularly those from the Northeastern Woodlands. Exhibits include a replica Algonkian village, and nature trails and a garden with plants used by native peoples. The museum opened on July 1, 1975, as the American Indian Archaeological Institute and changed to the present name in 1991.
