= J. Robert Donnelly Husky Heritage Sports Museum =

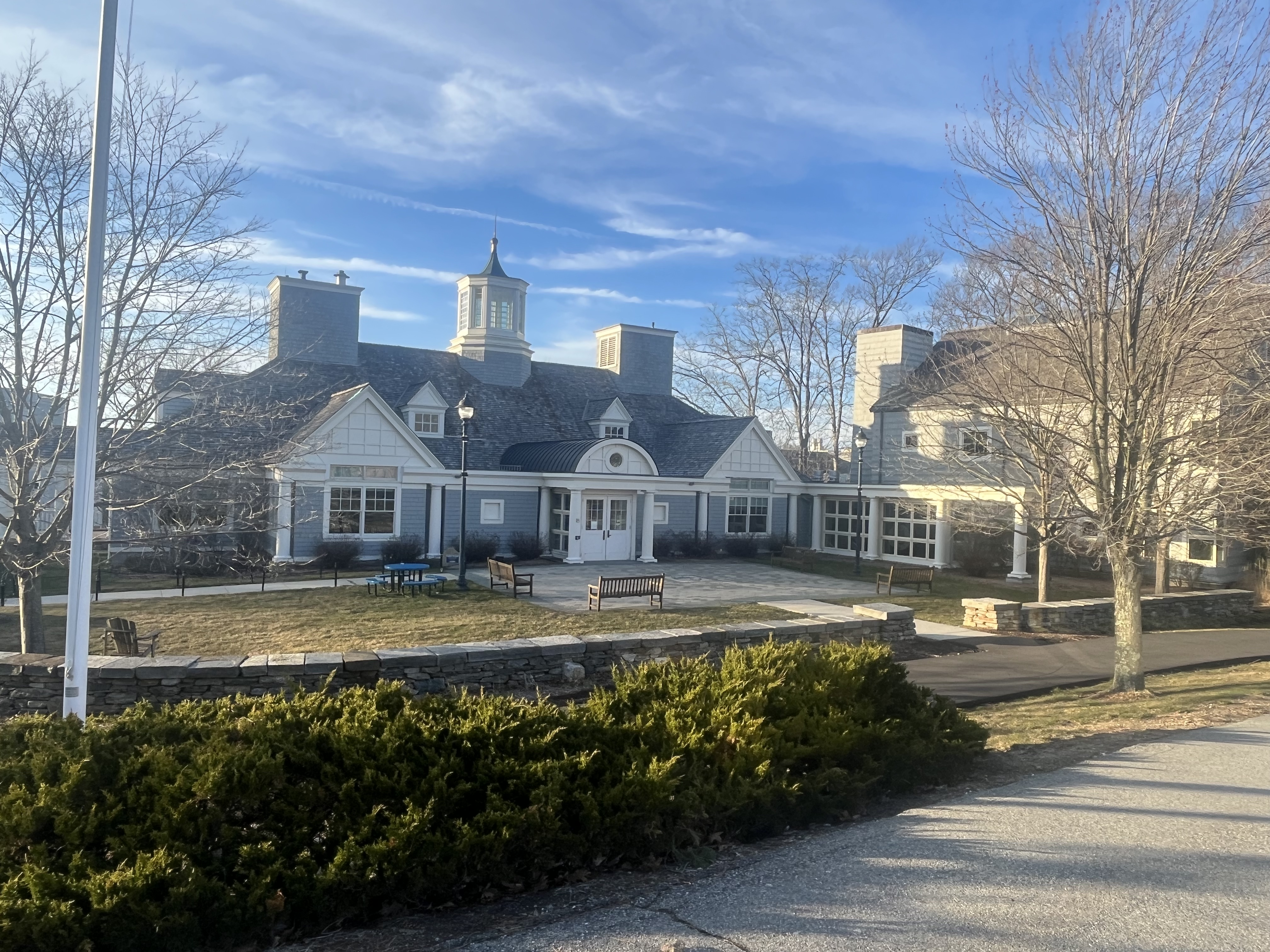
- Established: 2002
- Location: 2384 Alumni Drive; Storrs, Connecticut, United States
- Coordinates: 41.807205°N 72.257822°W
- Type: Sports museum
- Director: Mike Enright
- Owner: University of Connecticut
- Website: https://huskysports.museum.uconn.edu/

The J. Robert Donnelly Husky Heritage Sports Museum is a public museum located on the University of Connecticut's main campus in Storrs, Connecticut. The museum documents and celebrates UConn's intercollegiate athletics. Opening its doors on January 19, 2002, the 2,700-square-foot museum was named in honor of benefactor and 1940 Connecticut basketball and football captain J. Robert (Bob) Donnelly (1971-2005). Exhibits include national and regional championship trophies, trading cards, photographs, and various sports memorabilia, as well as a six-screen video wall replaying moments of triumph for the UConn Huskies. A life-size fiberglass sculpture of Jonathan the Husky, UConn's mascot, greets visitors at the museum entrance. The Connecticut Basketball Rotunda, featuring NCAA championship trophies and life-size cutouts of Ray Allen and Rebecca Lobo, is among the museum's permanent exhibits.
