= Museum of the Palestinian People =

Museum in Washington, D.C.

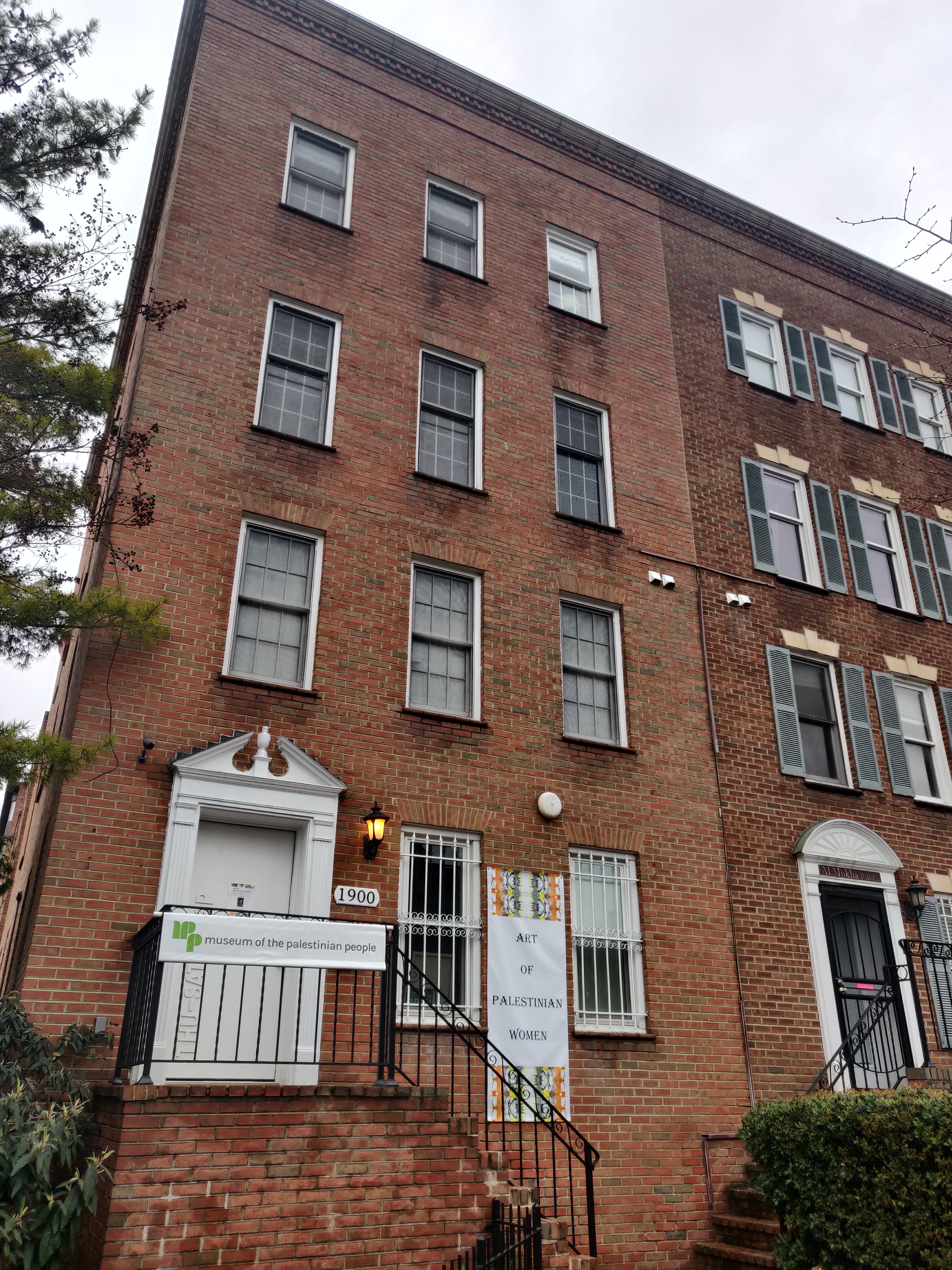
- Established: 15 June 2019
- Location: 1900 18th St NW; Washington, DC 20009
- Coordinates: 38.9159°N 77.0400°W
- Founder: Bshara Nassar
- Website: mpp-dc.org

The Museum of the Palestinian People (MPP) is a museum featuring the history, art, and culture of Palestinians. It is located in the Dupont Circle neighborhood of Washington, D.C. The museum was founded in 2019. It is the second Palestinian-themed museum in the United States (after Palestine Museum US) and the first in Washington, D.C.

Bshara Nassar is the museum's founder and director.

The museum is open Friday, Saturday, and Sunday.

It includes work by Sari Ibrahim Khoury.

== See also ==
- The Palestinian Museum
