= Northwest Park (Windsor) =

Park in Connecticut, United States

Coordinates: 41.905°N 72.703°W

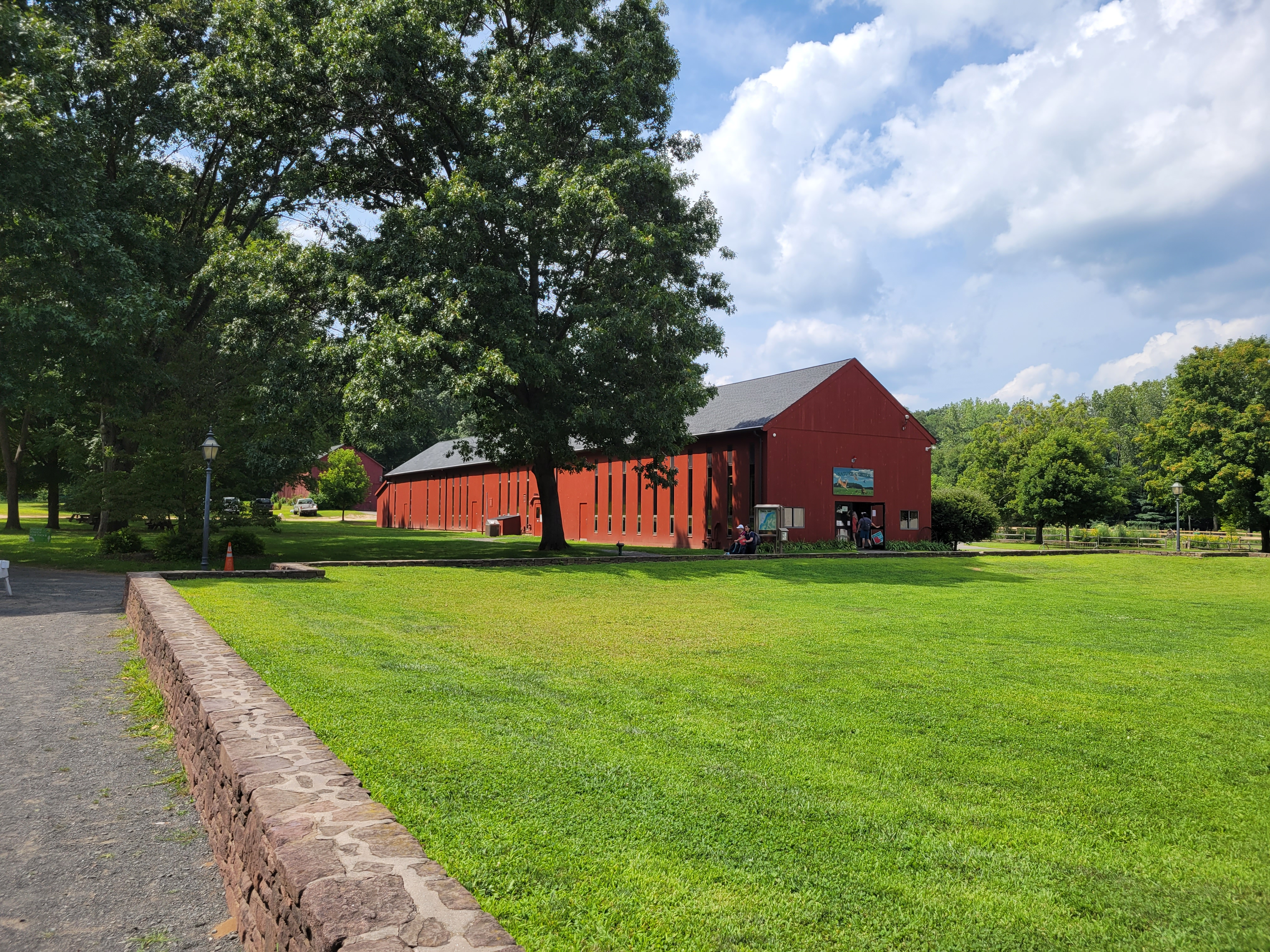
Nature Center

Northwest Park is a municipally owned park in the town of Windsor, Connecticut, which includes walking trails, soccer fields and a nature center. Located in the Poquonock section of Windsor along the Farmington River, the park covers 473 acres (1.91 km^{2}) of forests, fields and recreational areas.

The Luddy/Taylor Connecticut Valley Tobacco Museum, dedicated to preserving the history of the tobacco industry in the lower Connecticut River valley, is located near the entrance of the park.

The Northwest Park Nature Center features natural history, geology and meteorology exhibits, and offers nature and environmental education programs including a summer camp. There is an adjacent barn with farmyard animals.

The park hosts an annual Coffeehouse Concert Series, bringing in a variety of regional and national acts to perform in an intimate setting. Additionally, a country fair annually takes place in the fall at the park.

Other park amenities are trails for hiking, cross-country and skiing, a maple sugar house, a playground, picnic facilities, and a gift shop in the nature center.
