= Lost in New Haven =

Local history museum in New Haven, CT, U.S.

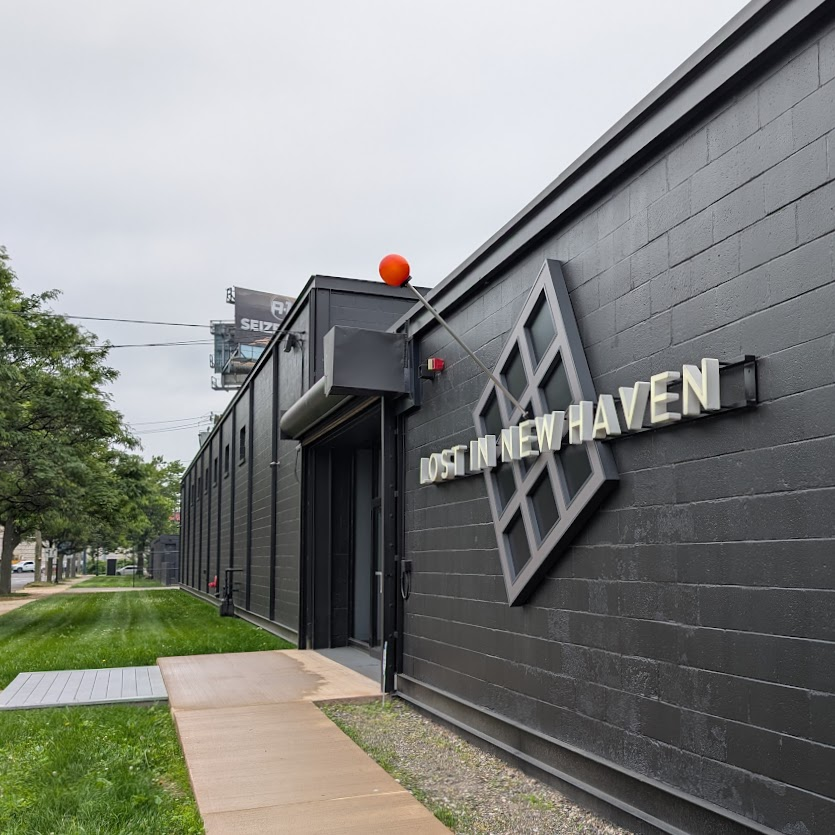
- Interactive fullscreen map
- Established: 2016
- Location: 80 Hamilton Street, New Haven, Connecticut, U.S.
- Coordinates: 41.30475316°N 72.91325785°W
- Type: Local history museum
- Director: Robert Greenberg
- Website: www.lostinnewhaven.org

Lost in New Haven is a museum in New Haven, Connecticut. It was established in 2016 by Robert Greenberg based on his vast collection of New Haven artifacts. Previously housed in temporary spaces, in 2020 it moved to its permanent home in a former painting company warehouse in the Wooster Square neighborhood of New Haven.

The museum holds items from throughout New Haven's history including salt-glazed pottery, a section of the Yale Fence, the statue of Christopher Columbus that once stood in Wooster Square park, and signs from iconic local institutions (New Haven Arena, Cutler's Records, Anchor Bar, Rubber Match). The museum is currently open and offering guided tours with our Founder and Executive Director Robert Greenberg on SATURDAY afternoons, as well as to school and private groups by appointment.
