= Fairfield Museum and History Center =

Coordinates: 41.1411°N 73.2481°W

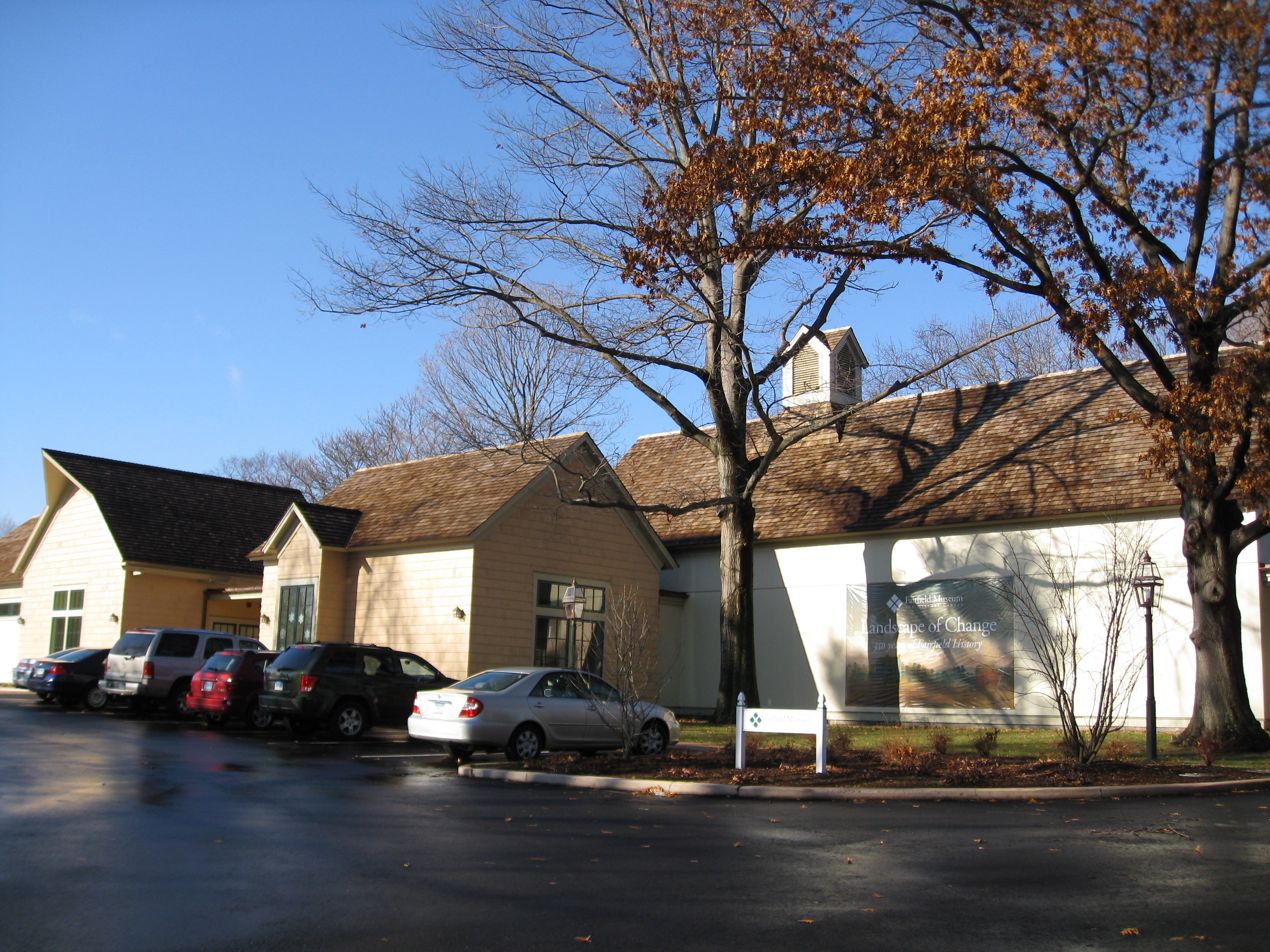
- The museum in 2008
- Established: 2007
- Location: 370 Beach Road; Fairfield, Connecticut, United States
- Type: History museum
- Website: www.fairfieldhistory.org

The Fairfield Museum and History Center is a museum and research library located at 370 Beach Road in Fairfield, Connecticut.

Established in 2007 by the 103 year old Fairfield Historical Society, the Fairfield Museum. The Fairfield Museum's goal is to promote civic engagement by celebrating the diverse history of its region and its people.

The 13,000-square-foot Museum features exhibition galleries, a special collection research library and reading room, an education classroom, an 80 seat meeting hall overlooking Fairfield's Town Green, and a shop.

The Fairfield Museum's art and history exhibitions have included the annual IMAGES juried photography exhibition, The Road to Busytown: Richard Scarry's Life in Fairfield County, Topping the Charts: The Rise of Bridgeport's Columbia Records, Culper Ring: The Spies of George Washington, Rising Tides – Fairfield's Coast: Past to Present in 2016, An American Story: Finding Home in Fairfield County in 2018. The Promise of Freedom: The Emancipation Proclamation, and the newly renovated Creating Community: 400 Years of Fairfield Stories. Programs and activities for youth, families, and the local community include the annual Holiday Express Train Show, Memorial Day Open House, Open Play at the Victorian Cottage, Summer Saturdays on the Museum Commons, the Jazz Fridays Summer Concert Series, Halloween on the Green, Legends & Hauntings Tours in the Old Burying Ground, historical walking tours exploring the Town Green, summer camps, and more.

The Fairfield Museum works closely with regional schools in order to assist with the K-12 education programs support national, state, and local learning goals. Each year, the Museum serves more than 4,000 students and teachers from 65 schools from across southwestern CT through high-quality educational programs.

The Jacky Durrell Meeting Hall overlooking the Town Green hosts lectures, panels, and shared discussions led by scholars, university professors, and historians that illuminate history through dialogue and debate with the larger community.

The Fairfield Museum's Research Library serves as a study center of Connecticut's history, serving more than 1,000 researchers each year, including students seeking primary resources for school projects, adults researching genealogy and community history, and academic researchers utilizing collections, publications, and manuscripts for advanced study. The Research Library includes historical monographs, manuscripts, family histories, newspapers, church and land records, and much more. The Library is home to the Collier Collection, an extensive library compiled by former State Historian Dr. Christopher Collier, making the Fairfield Museum's library one of the most complete resources for Connecticut history.

The Museum Shop features a selection of items for both adults and children. Many of the items are made in CT and support local artists and vendors.

== Historic properties ==
The town of Fairfield owns several historic properties that are managed by the Museum and open to the public for various purposes.

- The 1750 Ogden House (1520 Bronson Road) – An 18th-century saltbox house with period furnishings.
- Sun Tavern (Town Hall Green) – A 1780 tavern that was the site of a visit from President George Washington.
- Victorian Cottage (Town Hall Green)
- Victorian Barn (Town Hall Green) – The Victorian Barn (1888) exhibit explores Fairfield's agricultural roots and promotes conversations about contemporary food issues.
