= Materials Innovation and Recycling Authority =

- Formation: 1973
- Dissolved: July 1, 2026 (anticipated)
- Legal status: Reorganized 2014, Dissolution Authority 2023
- Headquarters: 200 Corporate Place, Suite 202, Rocky Hill, CT 06067
- Region served: Connecticut, USA
- President: Mark T. Daley
- Budget: $5,711,200 (FY 2011)
- Website: ctmira.org

The Materials Innovation and Recycling Authority or MIRA (2014-2023), and formerly known as the Connecticut Resources Recovery Authority or CRRA (1973-2014), is a defunct quasi-public agency that provided single-stream recycling and trash disposal for Connecticut cities and towns. It owned a trash-to-energy plant in Hartford, oversaw another in Preston, and financed the development of others in Bridgeport and Wallingford. Following the decommissioning of the Hartford waste-to-energy plant in 2022, MIRA was dissolved by the state legislature (Public Act No. 23-170), and succeed by the MIRA Dissolution Authority or MDA, which will continue former MIRA operations until new waste disposal contracts can be arranged by client municipalities. Dissolution authority operations are expected to wind down by July 1, 2026.

== Recycled resources ==
The MIRA/CRRA recovery facilities formerly recycled post-consumer waste in a mixed solid waste stream, sorting by manual and mechanical methods to prepare the resources for the end user.

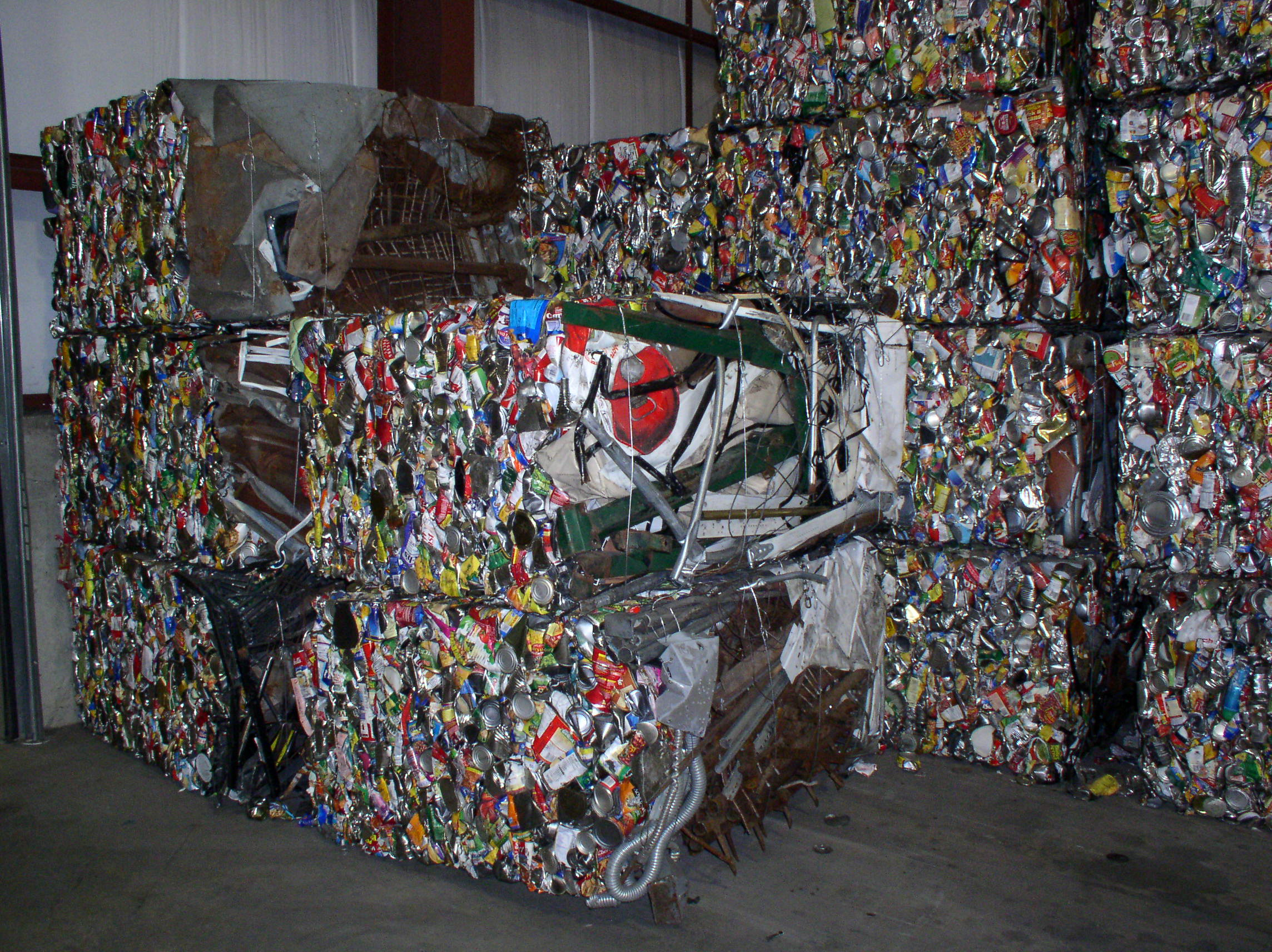
Can recycling at a similar facility

Recycled resources generate revenues, but they also save energy. How much depends on the material: some materials such as aluminum, carpet, and copper consume so much energy in production, that recycling these energy-intensive products results in large energy savings. For example, a 2005 report by the Environmental Protection Agency estimates that one ton of aluminum can recycling saves 209 million BTUs, which is equivalent to 36 barrels (5.7 m^{3}) of oil. The same report provides statistics for other materials: carpeting—106 million Btu (18 barrels (2.9 m^{3}) of crude oil); copper wire—83.1 million Btu (14 barrels); high-density polyethylene milk jugs—51.4 million Btu (8.9 barrels); steel cans—20.5 million Btu (3.5 barrels); newspaper—16.9 million Btu (2.9 barrels); and glass—2.7 million Btu (0.47 barrels)

Recycling also preserves natural resources. About 20 trees are needed to produce one ton of virgin paper and on average Americans use about 730 pounds of paper (approximately a third of a ton) per year.

Recycling everything is not possible. When it comes to disposal of the remaining waste, environmentalists favor sending it to trash-to-energy plant rather than a landfill where it can pollute the soil, water, and air through contamination and excess methane production.

== Trash-to-energy ==
In the United States, 64% of refuse is placed in landfills, 29% is recycled, and only about 7% generated energy. This is in contrast to some European countries where recycling and trash-to-energy processing is around 40-50%. Waste is converted to energy when the heat generated by burning trash is directed to boil water for steam to spin turbines. The electricity created by the spinning turbines is harnessed and sold to the region's electrical grid.

In the early 1990s, the Clean Air Act increased regulations on trash-burning facilities causing the number of plants to shrink from more than 1,100 in 1990 to fewer than 90 today. Connecticut is host to six of those facilities, in part due to a conscious commitment to reduce the number of landfill developments and find environmentally responsible means to manage the state's waste.

Under the leadership of Governor Thomas J. Meskill, the General Assembly created the Connecticut Resources Recovery Authority in 1973 with the passage of Public Act 73-549. Bridgeport was selected for the site of the CRRA's first regional trash-to-energy (TTE) project. Connecticut will be the first state in the United States without an active municipal solid waste landfill when a 171-acre (0.69 km^{2}) landfill in Windsor closes, which is slated to happen in 2015.

== Educational outreach ==
The CRRA provided educational programs for children and adults through the CRRA Trash Museum in Hartford, which closed in 2016. The outreach program coordinated in-school programs, scout tours, displays at public events, and offered curriculum-on-the-go educational kits for teachers and group leaders. In 2002, CRRA was awarded the Beth Brown Boettner Award by the National Recycling Coalition for outstanding public education. In 2012, CRRA received a CQIA Innovation Prize from the Connecticut Quality Improvement Partnership for its combination of single-stream technology and education that increased recycling rates in the towns it serves.

=== The Trash Museum ===

Opened in 1995, the Mid-Connecticut Project Trash Museum is a 6,500 sq ft (600 m^{2}) museum in Hartford, Connecticut with educational exhibits about recycling, trash to energy and landfills. The museum features a sculpture of reclaimed garbage called the "temple of trash." Real-time recycling operations are displayed on close-circuit television in the mezzanine of the museum. The Trash Museum permanently closed in 2016.

=== The Garbage Museum ===
Opened in 1993, the Garbage Museum featured a "Trash-O-Saurus" displayed in the middle of the building. It was a dinosaur made entirely from discarded items salvaged from landfills and trash bins, and it represents the amount of trash one person generates in a year. The museum featured a sky-walk observation hallway above the recycling center with a self-guided tour that stepped the museum visitor through the tipping and sorting process. From the walkway, visitors could watch recycling collection trucks dump their loads and see how glass, plastic bottles, metal, paper and cardboard are sorted, crushed or baled. The museum featured mostly hands-on activities, such as the "trash-o-saurus" scavenger hunt to find specified items on the dinosaur and a game-show trivia exhibit, where a wrong answer would shower you in recyclables.

Until 2009, funding for the CRRA Garbage Museum came from revenues generated from the sale of recyclables processed at the CRRA facility. With the downturn in economy, and the cancellation of a six town contracts and the lower prices for commodities sold, the CRRA was no longer able to generate enough revenue to fund the museum's costs and it closed in August 2011.

The Garbage Museum was located at 1410 Honeyspot Road Extension in Stratford, Connecticut.

== Controversies ==
=== Enron Debacle and Mid-Connecticut Project Legal Action ===
In 2003, the towns of Barkhamsted and New Hartford filed suit against CRRA, claiming that they were the ultimate losers in a $220 million failed agreement between CRRA and Enron through the former's imposition of increased tipping fees and emergency borrowing from the taxpayers. CRRA extended an illegal, unsecured loan to Enron, which stopped paying the money back soon thereafter when it infamously filed for bankruptcy in 2001. In 2006, the suit was expanded to a class-action on behalf all 70 towns within the Mid-Connecticut Project. In June 2007, the Waterbury Superior Court ruled in favor of the plaintiffs, awarding the 70 towns a $36 million judgement and $8.9 million in legal fees to the towns' legal team, which included David Golub and Joseph Meaney, prominent Connecticut attorneys in the Stamford and Hartford areas, respectively.

=== Michael C. Harrington v. Freedom of Information Commission et al. ===
Communications between the CRRA and lawyer/lobbyist Thomas D. Ritter were at the center of a freedom of information (FOI) battle in a Connecticut Supreme Court case, where the decision narrowed the circumstances in which the political and business advice of an attorney is protected under attorney client privilege. Ritter, who headed the government relations practice at the law firm Brown Rudnick, found his firm in the situation of receiving payments from CRRA for legal work, but then arguing he was not a lobbyist because his firm was not receiving money for lobbying public officials.
