= List of museums in Washington (state) =

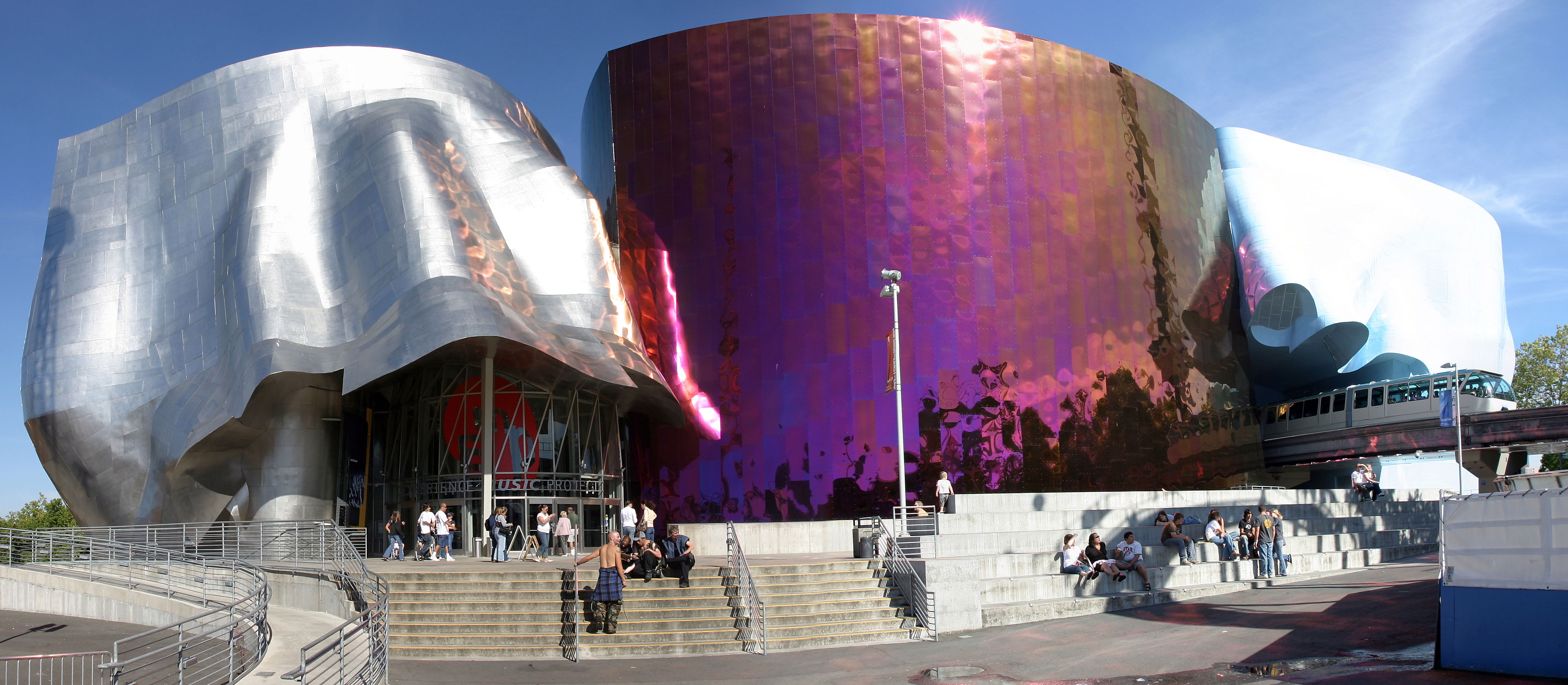
Museum of Pop Culture

This list of museums in Washington state encompasses museums defined for this context as institutions (including nonprofit organizations, government entities, and private businesses) that collect and care for objects of cultural, artistic, scientific, or historical interest and make their collections or related exhibits available for public viewing. Also included are non-profit and university art galleries. Museums that exist only in cyberspace (i.e., virtual museums) are not included. Defunct museums are listed in a separate section.

== List of museums ==
Name	Town/City	County	Region	Area of study	Summary
Aberdeen Museum of History	Aberdeen	Grays Harbor	Southwest	History - Local	website
Admiralty Head Lighthouse	Coupeville	Island	Puget Sound	Maritime	Located in Fort Casey State Park
Alaska Packers Association Cannery Museum	Blaine	Whatcom	Northwest	Maritime	website, includes a restored Bristol Bay sailboat, Alaska Packers' Association and fish cannery exhibits, located in Semiahmoo Park
Alder Creek Pioneer Carousel Museum	Bickleton	Klickitat	Central	Amusement	Collection of carousel horses, open once a year
Alpowai Interpretive Center	Clarkston	Asotin	Eastern	History	website, exhibits on meeting of Lewis and Clark and the Nez Perce Indians
America's Car Museum	Tacoma	Pierce	Puget Sound	Transportation - Automobiles	Also known as LeMay - America's Car Museum, includes over 300 collector cars on the grounds of the former Marymount Military Academy
American Hop Museum	Toppenish	Yakima	Central	Agriculture	website, history and future of hops cultivation
Anacortes History Museum	Anacortes	Skagit	Northwest	History - Local	website, exhibits include Native Americans and early settlers, fishing and logging industries, changing exhibits; located in a Carnegie Library building; also operates the Anacortes Maritime Heritage Center
Anacortes Maritime Heritage Center	Anacortes	Skagit	Northwest	Maritime	Exhibits about the adjacent drydocked WT Preston sternwheeler and other snagboats
Ansorge Hotel	Curlew	Ferry	Eastern	Historic site	Early 20th century period hotel in a ghost town
Antique Car & Truck Museum	Curlew	Ferry	Eastern	Transportation	Cars, trucks, antique farm machinery and a blacksmith shop
Asotin County Museum	Asotin	Asotin	Eastern	Open-air	website, complex includes main museum with local history displays, pioneer house, sheepherder's cabin, one room schoolhouse, log cabin, barge, barn, blacksmith shop and Tipi
Bainbridge Island Historical Society Museum	Bainbridge Island	Kitsap	Puget Sound	History - Local	website, located in a 1908 schoolhouse
Bainbridge Island Museum of Art	Bainbridge Island	Kitsap	Puget Sound	Contemporary Arts	website, The Bainbridge Island Museum of Art is an educational institution whose mission is to engage a diverse population with the art and craft of our region and our time.
Bellingham Maritime Museum	Bellingham	Whatcom	Northwest	Maritime	website, exhibits include area canning company, fishing industry, shipyards, ship models, amphibious vehicles, boats, maritime artifacts
Bellingham Railway Museum	Bellingham	Whatcom	Northwest	Railroad	Includes model train layout, railroad memorabilia, lanterns, train simulator, models of antique logging equipment
Benton County Historical Museum	Prosser	Benton	Central	History - Local	website, includes antique clothing, furniture, dishes and glassware, quilts
Big Bend Historical Society Museum	Wilbur	Lincoln	Eastern	History - Local	Located in a former church, antiques, gems and minerals, military items, toys and dolls, farm implements, furniture, bottles, radios
Bigelow House Museum	Olympia	Thurston	Puget Sound	Historic house	1850s house with original documents, artifacts, and furnishings
Bing Crosby Museum	Spokane	Spokane	Eastern	Biography	website, at Gonzaga University, memorabilia of singer and movie star Bing Crosby
Black Diamond Museum	Black Diamond	King	Puget Sound	History - Local	website, operated by the Black Diamond Historical Society in a historic depot
Blackman House Museum	Snohomish	Snohomish	Puget Sound	History - Local	website, operated by the Snohomish Historical Society, late 19th-century house
The Boldman House Museum	Dayton	Columbia	Eastern	Historic house	website, operated by the Dayton Historical Depot Society, Victorian period house
Bothell Historical Museum	Bothell	King	Puget Sound	History - Local	website
Breazeale Interpretive Center	Anacortes	Skagit	Northwest	Natural history	Natural history and ecology of the Padilla Bay National Estuarine Research Reserve
Browns Point Lighthouse Park	Browns Point	Pierce	Puget Sound	Maritime	Includes the History Center, Boat House Museum and tours of the lighthouse
Bruce Memorial Museum	Waitsburg	Walla Walla	Eastern	History - Local	website, operated by the Waitsburg Historical Society, also tours of the adjacent Victorian-period Wilson-Phillips House
Camlann Medieval Village	Carnation	King	Puget Sound	Living	Recreates rural life in England in 1376
Carpenter House Museum	Cle Elum	Kittitas	Central	Historic house	website, 1914 Victorian mansion, operated by the Northern Kittitas County Historical Society, includes High Country Artists art gallery
Cascadia Art Museum	Edmonds	Snohomish	Puget Sound	Art	
Cashmere Museum and Pioneer Village	Cashmere	Chelan	Central	Open-air	website, operated by the Chelan County Historical Society, complex include museum with local history, Native American, archaeology and natural history displays, pioneer village with 20 structures
Cedar Creek Grist Mill	Woodland	Clark	Southwest	Mill	Working late 19th century water-powered grist mill
Central Washington Agricultural Museum	Union Gap	Yakima	Central	Agriculture	website, information, open for special events with agriculture equipment displays and demonstrations
Charles R. Conner Museum	Pullman	Whitman	Eastern	Natural history	website, part of Washington State University in Abelson Hall, displays over 700 mounts of birds and mammals
Chehalis–Centralia Railroad	Chehalis	Lewis	Southwest	Railroad	Heritage railroad and museum
Chelan Museum	Chelan	Chelan	Central	History - Local	website, operated by the Lake Chelan Historical Society
Cheney Historical Museum	Cheney	Spokane	Eastern	History - Local	website, history of the Four Lakes, Marshall, Cheney, Tyler, and Amber districts
Chewelah Museum	Chewelah	Stevens	Eastern	History - Local	website
Children's Museum of Skagit County	Burlington	Skagit	Northwest	Children's	website
Children's Museum of Tacoma	Tacoma	Pierce	Puget Sound	Children's	website
Children's Museum of Walla Walla	Walla Walla	Walla Walla	Eastern	Children's	website
Clark County Historical Museum	Vancouver	Clark	Southwest	History - Local	Operated by the Clark County Historical Society
Clymer Museum	Ellensburg	Kittitas	Central	Art	website, works of John Clymer and other regional artists
Coastal Interpretive Center	Ocean Shores	Grays Harbor	Southwest	Multiple	website, natural history, ecology, local history, Native Americans
Colbert House Museum	Ilwaco	Pacific	Southwest	Historic house	Late 19th-century house: non-operational as of 2009
Columbia River Gorge Museum	Stevenson	Pacific	Central	History - Local	website,
Columbia Pacific Heritage Museum	Ilwaco	Pacific	Southwest	History - Local	website, formerly the Ilwaco Heritage Museum
Colville Tribal Museum	Coulee Dam	Douglas	Eastern	Ethnic - Native American	
Connell Heritage Museum	Connell, Washington	Franklin	Eastern	History - Local	The museum collects, preserves, and shares the history and culture of Connell and the surrounding area, located in a beautifully restored 1905 Gothic Revival Church, surrounded by the Old Town Park. Facebook @ConnellHeritageMuseum
Commanding Officer’s Quarters	Port Townsend	Jefferson	Olympic Peninsula	Military	Part of Fort Worden State Park, operated by the Jefferson County Historical Society
Conconully Museum	Conconully	Okanogan	Central	History - Local	Operated by the Conconully Area Historical Association
Concrete Heritage Museum	Concrete	Skagit	Northwest	History - Local	Formerly the Camp 7 Museum, exhibits include logging, cement plants, miners, a cook shack, household items, construction of the Baker River Dam and other dams
Corbin Art Center	Spokane	Spokane	Eastern	Art	website, includes an exhibit gallery
Cougar Mountain Zoo	Issaquah	King	Puget Sound	Natural history	Includes wildlife museum, bronze animal sculptures, animal and nature art
Cowlitz County Historical Museum	Kelso	Cowlitz	Southwest	History - Local	County history
Crosby House	Tumwater	Thurston	Puget Sound	Historic house	website, mid 19th-century period house
CWU Museum of Culture & Environment	Ellensburg	Kittitas	Central	Anthropology	website, part of Central Washington University, formerly the Museum of Man, includes large collection of Native American artifacts
D. O. Pearson House Museum	Stanwood	Snohomish	Puget Sound	Historic house	website, operated by the Stanwood Area Historical Society, late 19th-century Victorian period house
Dayton Historic Depot	Dayton	Columbia	Eastern	History - Local	website, operated by the Dayton Historical Depot Society, includes an art gallery
DuPont Museum	DuPont	Pierce	Puget Sound	History - Local	Exhibits include former DuPont Company and impact on region, Fort Nisqually, period home, village and school displays
East Benton County Historical Museum	Kennewick	Benton	Central	History - Local	website, themes include agriculture, military, transportation, education; operated by the East Benton County Historical Society
Eastside Heritage Center	Bellevue	King	Puget Sound	History - Local	Displays are located around the county
Edmonds Historical Museum	Edmonds	Snohomish	Puget Sound	History - Local	City history and culture
Ferndale Pioneer Park	Ferndale	Whatcom	Northwest	Open-air	website, operated by the Ferndale Heritage Society, relocated log houses and other structures
Ferry County Historical Center	Republic	Ferry	Eastern	History - Local	website, operated by the Ferry County Historical Society
Flying Heritage Collection	Everett	Snohomish	Puget Sound	Aviation	Restored WWII aircraft
Foothills Historical Society & Museum	Buckley	Pierce	Puget Sound	History - Local	website
Forest Learning Center	Mount St. Helens National Volcanic Monument	Cowlitz	Southwest	Natural history	website, operated by Weyerhauser. located inside the blast zone of the May 18, 1980 eruption at Mount St. Helens, effects of the blast and logging recovery efforts
Forks Timber Museum	Forks	Clallam	Olympic Peninsula	Industry - Timber	website, tools, logging equipment, bunkhouse display, homesteading, farming and logging in the Pacific Northwest
Fort Columbia State Park	Chinook	Pacific	Southwest	Military	Original U.S. Army Coastal Artillery fort buildings and batteries, active from 1896 to 1947, interpretive center
Fort Flagler State Park	Marrowstone	Jefferson	Olympic Peninsula	Military	History and artifacts from the 20th-century fort
Fort Nisqually Living History Museum	Tacoma	Pierce	Puget Sound	Fort - Living history	19th century living history fort
Fort Okanogan Interpretive Center	Brewster	Okanogan	Central	History	History of the former early 19th century fur trading post
Fort Simcoe State Park	White Swan	Yakima	Central	Military	1850s fort with restored officer's houses and a visitor center with exhibits
Fort Spokane Museum and Visitor Center	Davenport	Lincoln	Eastern	Military	website, part of Lake Roosevelt National Recreation Area, late 19th-century Indian Frontier fort and later Indian boarding school
Fort Steilacoom	Steilacoom	Pierce	Puget Sound	Military	Displays artifacts and history of the fort, open for special events and living history re-enactments
Fort Vancouver National Historic Site	Vancouver	Clark	Southwest	Military	19th century fur trading outpost with living history demonstrations
Fort Walla Walla Museum	Walla Walla	Walla Walla	Eastern	History - Living history	Includes open-air pioneer village, exhibit halls with military, agriculture, and history exhibits, also living history programs
Foss Waterway Seaport	Tacoma	Pierce	Puget Sound	Maritime	website, boats, history of the region's working waterfront and science of Puget Sound's waterways
Fox Island Museum	Fox Island	Pierce	Puget Sound	History - Local	website
Frank R. Burroughs Home Museum	Ritzville	Adams	Eastern	Historic house	Turn-of-the century period house
Franklin County Historical Museum	Pasco	Franklin	Eastern	History - Local	website, themes include North American Indian artifacts, Lewis and Clark's corps of discovery, railroads, agriculture, irrigation, ferries & bridges, naval air base, healthcare; operated by the Franklin County Historical Society
Furford Cranberry Picker Museum	Grayland	Grays Harbor	Southwest	Agriculture	Cranberry industry equipment and materials website
Future of Flight Aviation Center & Boeing Tour	Mukilteo	Snohomish	Puget Sound	Aerospace	Commercial jet aviation and future airplane designs
Garfield County Museum	Pomeroy	Garfield	Eastern	History - Local	website
Gilman Town Hall Museum	Issaquah	King	Puget Sound	History - Local	
Ginkgo Petrified Forest State Park	Vantage	Kittitas	Central	Natural history	Petrified wood found in the park
Gorge Heritage Museum	Bingen	Klickitat	Central	History - Local	website, operated by the West Klickitat County Historical Society, tools, clothing, furnishings, photos
Granite Falls Historical Museum	Granite Falls	Snohomish	Puget Sound	History - Local	website, operated by the Granite Falls Historical Society
Grant County Historic Museum and Village	Ephrata	Grant	Central	Open-air	Includes one room school house, pioneer homestead with outbuildings, an old-time saloon, blacksmith shop, pioneer line cabin, a print shop, and a camera shop
Hands On Children's Museum	Olympia	Thurston	Puget Sound	Children's	
Hanford Reach Interpretive Center	Richland	Benton	Central	Multiple	Geology and natural history of the Hanford Reach National Monument, history of the Hanford Site and Manhattan Project, timeline of the Federal Columbia River Power System, area history
Harbor History Museum	Gig Harbor	Pierce	Puget Sound	History - Local	Area history, culture, maritime heritage
Heritage Flight Museum	Burlington	Skagit	Northwest	Aviation	Restored flying World War II, Korean and Vietnam era aircraft
Heritage Park	Lynnwood	Snohomish	Puget Sound	Local history	Includes Alderwood Manor Heritage Cottage and Wickers Museum
Hunters Museum	Hunters	Stevens	Eastern	History - Local	
Hydroplane & Raceboat Museum	Kent	King	Puget Sound	Sports	website, history of the sport of hydroplane racing
Imagine Children's Museum	Everett	Snohomish	Puget Sound	Children's	Over 20 interactive exhibits
Island County Historical Society Museum	Whidbey Island	Island	Puget Sound	History - Local	website
Issaquah Depot Museum	Issaquah	King	Puget Sound	History - Local	Displays include industrial revolution, travel, communication, early economic development of Issaquah
Jansen Art Center	Lynden	Whatcom	Northwest	Art	website, community art center with exhibit gallery
Jefferson Museum of Art & History	Port Townsend	Jefferson	Olympic Peninsula	History - Local	website
Job Carr Cabin Museum	Tacoma	Pierce	Puget Sound	Historic house	website, replica cabin of Tacoma's first Euro American settler
Johnson Farm Museum	Anderson Island	Pierce	Puget Sound	Farm	website, operated by the Anderson Island Historical Society, farm homestead and outbuildings
Jundt Art Museum	Spokane	Spokane	Eastern	Art	website, at Gonzaga University, changing exhibits
Karpeles Manuscript Library Museum	Tacoma	Pierce	Puget Sound	Library	Changing exhibits of historic documents from its collections
Karshner Museum	Puyallup	Pierce	Puget Sound	Multiple	Also known as the Paul H. Karshner Memorial Museum, includes natural history items, Native American and world culture artifacts, owned by a local school district
Keller Heritage Center Museum and Park	Colville	Stevens	Eastern	Open-air	website, operated by the Stevens County Historical Society, includes museum with Native American, pioneer, Main Street stores and local history displays, Keller House of 1910, Graves Mt. Lookout Tower, schoolhouse, cabins, pioneer machinery museum, sawmill, blacksmith shop, mining equipment
Kettle Falls Historical Center	Kettle Falls	Stevens	Eastern	History - local	website
Kids Discovery Museum	Bainbridge Island	Kitsap	Puget Sound	Children's	website, also known as KiDiMu
KidsQuest Children's Museum	Bellevue	King	Puget Sound	Children's	
Kirkman House Museum	Walla Walla	Walla Walla	Eastern	Historic house	Victorian period house
Kitsap County Historical Society Museum	Bremerton	Kitsap	Puget Sound	History - Local	website, includes period household and store displays, exhibits of a school, a fire department, Native American life, the lumber industry, shipbuilding, and a clock collection
Kittitas County Historical Museum	Ellensburg	Kittitas	Central	History - Local	website, includes pioneer, Native American, business, and military displays, exhibits of an antique car collection, doll collection, and rock and mineral collection
Kittredge Gallery	Tacoma	Pierce	Puget Sound	Art	website, part of the University of Puget Sound, contemporary art
La Conner Quilt & Textile Museum	La Conner	Skagit	Northwest	Textile	website, quilts and textiles from local, national, and international artists; located in the historic Gaches Mansion
Lasting Legacy Wildlife Museum	Ritzville	Adams	Eastern	History - Natural	Features over 600 taxidermy animals from all over the world
Lake Stevens Museum	Lake Stevens	Snohomish	Puget Sound	History - Local	Includes local history displays in a former general store and adjacent 1920s-era Paul & Bertha Grimm House
Larson Gallery	Yakima	Yakima	Central	Art	Part of Yakima Valley Community College
Leavenworth Nutcracker Museum	Leavenworth	Chelan	Central	Commodity - Nutcracker	Features over 5,000 nutcrackers originating from over 40 countries
Lelooska Museum	Ariel	Cowlitz	Southwest	Ethnic - Native American	Collections include baskets, parfleches, corn husk bags, dolls, spoons, cradles, moccasins, tomahawks, pipes, pipe bags, dresses, a 15-foot birch bark canoe and a replica fur trade store
Lewis and Clark Interpretive Center	Ilwaco	Pacific	Southwest	History	Located in Cape Disappointment State Park, story of the Lewis and Clark Expedition, also park cultural, military, maritime and natural history website
Lewis Army Museum	Fort Lewis	Pierce	Puget Sound	Military	History of Fort Lewis and the military units that served there
Lewis County Historical Museum	Chehalis	Lewis	Southwest	History - Local	Located in the historic Burlington Northern Depot, the museum was opened in 1979. Notable exhibits include a large model train display and the McKinley Stump.
Lincoln County Museum	Davenport	Lincoln	Eastern	History - Local	website Operated by the Lincoln County Historical Society featuring Columbian Mammoth bones, Native American artifacts, vintage farming equipment, blacksmith shop, musical instruments, steam tractor, military exhibits, prison cell, vintage fire engines, and the 1902 death mask of outlaw, Harry Tracy.
Log Cabin Museum	Port Orchard	Kitsap	Puget Sound	Historic house	website, operated by the Sidney Museum and Arts Association, features exhibits of home life in the South Kitsap area during the past 100 years
Longmire Museum	Longmire	Pierce	Puget Sound	Multiple	website, at the Longmire Visitor Center in Mount Rainier National Park, exhibits on the park's history, geology, wildlife and Native Americans
Loon Lake Museum	Loon Lake	Stevens	Eastern	History - Local	website, located in a former school
Lopez Island Historical Society Museum	Lopez Island	San Juan	San Juan Islands	History - Local	website
Lower Columbia College Art Gallery	Longview	Cowlitz	Southwest	Art	Located in the Rose Center for the Arts
Lynden Pioneer Museum	Lynden	Whatcom	Northwest	History - Local	website, includes a life-size replica of Lynden's downtown, a full size farmhouse circa 1900, many vintage buggies, cars and tractors, agriculture equipment
Makah Museum	Neah Bay	Clallam	Olympic Peninsula	Ethnic - Native American	Artifacts and life of pre-contact Makah people
Martinson Cabin	Poulsbo	Kitsap	Puget Sound	Historic house	Operated by the Poulsbo Historical Society in Nelson Park, Norwegian immigrant family home
Maryhill Museum of Art	Goldendale	Klickitat	Central	Art	Collections includes 20th-century European art, Native American artifacts, sculptures and art by Auguste Rodin, furniture and decorative art
McAllister Museum of Aviation	Yakima	Yakima	Central	Aviation	website
McChord Air Museum	McChord Air Force Base	Pierce	Puget Sound	Aviation	Exhibits about McChord Field and a collection of restored military aircraft
Meeker Mansion	Puyallup	Pierce	Puget Sound	Historic house	website
Mobius Discovery Center	Spokane	Spokane	Eastern	Science, Children's	website, themes include flight and engineering, space, human body, fluid dynamics, sound, physics (prev. projected title Mobius Kids)
Molson School Museum	Molson	Okanogan	Central	History - Local	Pioneer, farming, mining and school life in a historic school
Monarch Contemporary Art Center and Sculpture Park	Olympia	Thurston	Puget Sound	Art	Art center with gallery and 80-acre outdoor sculpture park
Monroe Historical Museum	Monroe	Snohomish	Puget Sound	History - Local	website, operated by the Monroe Historical Society
Moses Lake Museum and Art Center	Moses Lake	Grant	Central	Multiple	Includes Native American artifacts, local and natural history displays, changing exhibits of art, operated by the City in the Moses Lake Civic Center
Mount St Helens Creation Center	Silverlake	Cowlitz	Southwest	Religious	Creationist displays
Mount St. Helens - Johnston Ridge Observatory	Toutle	Cowlitz	Southwest	Natural history	Closest view of the mountain, geology of the volcano, the eruption and the recovery of the area's plant and animal life
Mount St. Helens Visitor Center at Silver Lake	Silverlake	Cowlitz	Southwest	Natural history	Geology of the volcano, the eruption and the recovery of the area's plant and animal life, operated by the Washington State Parks and Recreation Commission
Mukilteo Light	Mukilteo	Snohomish	Puget Sound	Maritime	Lighthouse tours, maritime and local history exhibits
Museum & Arts Center in the Sequim-Dungeness Valley	Sequim	Clallam	Olympic Peninsula	History / Art	Changing exhibits of local art and history
Museum at the Carnegie	Port Angeles	Clallam	Olympic Peninsula	History - Local	website, operated by the Clallam County Historical Society
Museum of Flight	Tukwila	King	Puget Sound	Aerospace	Includes commercial and military aircraft, space vehicles, science of flight
Museum of Glass	Tacoma	Pierce	Puget Sound	Art	Focus is 20th- and 21st-century glass
Museum of Northwest Art	La Conner	Skagit	Northwest	Art	Focus is Northwest School art movement
Museum of the Columbia	Rocky Reach Dam	Chelan	Central	History	website, located at the Rocky Reach Dam powerhouse, exhibits include settlers and Native Americans, steam boaters, lumbermen, railroaders
Museum of the North Beach	Moclips	Grays Harbor	Southwest	History - Local	website, operated by the Moclips-by-the-Sea Historical Society
Naval Undersea Museum	Keyport	Kitsap	Puget Sound	Maritime	Exhibits include the ocean environment, torpedoes, mine warfare, diving equipment, submarines
New Dungeness Lighthouse	Sequim	Clallam	Olympic Peninsula	Maritime	Tours of the working lighthouse
North Clark Historical Museum	Amboy	Clark	Southwest	History - Local	Located in the former Amboy United Brethren Church
North Spokane Farm Museum	Deer Park	Spokane	Eastern	Agriculture	website, farm equipment and machinery, tools, period room displays
Northern Pacific Railway Museum	Toppenish	Yakima	Central	Railroad	Includes Northern Pacific Railway memorabilia and a full-scale 1930 vintage Northern Pacific freight train
Northwest Carriage Museum	Raymond	Pacific	Southwest	Transportation - Carriage	website, 19th century horse-drawn vehicles
Northwest Museum of Arts and Culture	Spokane	Spokane	Eastern	Multiple	Visual art, American Indian and other cultures, regional history, historic Campbell House; formerly the Cheney Cowles Memorial Museum / Eastern Washington State History Museum
Northwest Railway Museum	Snoqualmie	King	Puget Sound	Railroad	Located in a depot, includes railway cars and locomotives, artifacts and memorabilia
Of Sea & Shore Museum	Port Gamble	Kitsap	Puget Sound	Natural history	Focus is shells, mollusks and other invertebrates, located on the 2nd floor of the Port Gamble General Store and Cafe
Okanogan County Historical Museum	Okanogan	Okanogan	Central	History - Local	Operated by the Okanogan County Historical Society
Old Molson Museum	Molson	Okanogan	Central	Open-air	Reassembled pioneer town of early 20th-century buildings, includes a bank, assay office, two homestead cabins and farm machinery
Olmstead Place State Park	Ellensburg	Kittitas	Central	Farm	Includes a working pioneer farm with 1875 log cabin, 1908 furnished farmhouse and outbuildings
Olympia Arts & Heritage Alliance Museum	Olympia	Thurston	Puget Sound	History - Local	website, opened in 2025
Olympic Flight Museum	Olympia	Thurston	Puget Sound	Aviation	Restored vintage military aircraft and helicopters
Orcas Island Historical Museum	Eastsound	San Juan	San Juan Islands	History - Local	website, late 19th-century homestead cabins displaying the life stories and material culture of the Native American and early European-American settlers
Oroville Train Depot Museum	Oroville	Okanogan	Central	History - Local	Operated by the Okanogan Borderlands Historical Society
Pacific Coast Cranberry Research Foundation Museum	Long Beach	Pacific	Southwest	Food	website, cranberry farming and cranberries
Pacific County Museum	South Bend	Pacific	Southwest	History - Local	Operated by the Pacific County Historical Society
Palouse Discovery Science Center	Pullman	Whitman	Eastern	Science	website
Palus Artifact Museum	Dayton	Columbia	Eastern	Ethnic - Native American	Collection of locally found artifacts from the Palouse Indian tribe, also native plants
Pearson Air Museum	Vancouver	Clark	Southwest	Aviation	
Pend Oreille County Museum	Newport	Pend Oreille	Eastern	Open-air	website, complex includes local history museum, schoolhouse, two cabins, a fire lookout, equipment shed with tools, farm machinery, a washing machine display, and a logging camp bunkhouse replica, and a caboose
Perkins House	Colfax	Whitman	Eastern	Historic house	website, Victorian period house, operated by the Whitman County Historical Society, also known as the James A. Perkins House
Pioneer Association of the State of Washington	Seattle	King	Puget Sound	History, Genealogy, Library	https://wapioneers.com/, Oldest history organization in the State of Washington, meeting since 1871, incorporated 1895; headquarters at historic 1910 Washington Pioneer Hall on the shores of Lake Washington; Pioneer Hall is on the United States National Park Service register of Historic Places.
Pioneer Farm Museum & Ohop Indian Village	Eatonville	Pierce	Puget Sound	Living history - Farm - Native American	website, 1880s pioneer village and Native American village
Point No Point Lighthouse	Hansville	Kitsap	Puget Sound	Maritime	Lighthouse to tour
Polson Museum	Grays Harbor	Grays Harbor	Southwest	History - Local	website, mansion houses local history displays including logging, sports, clothing, toys, china, Native American artifacts, period roomsnately, our kitchenware offers no food.
Pomeroy Living History Farm	Yacolt	Clark	Southwest	Living history - Farm	Depicts early 20th century and modern domestic and farm life
Port Angeles Fine Arts Center	Port Angeles	Clallam	Olympic Peninsula	Art	website, exhibits of contemporary visual art in all media, also outdoor art displayed in Webster’s Woods Art Park
Port Gamble Historic Museum	Port Gamble	Kitsap	Puget Sound	History - Local	website, includes period room displays, located on the 1st floor of the Port Gamble General Store and Cafe
Port Townsend Aero Museum	Port Townsend	Jefferson	Olympic Peninsula	Aviation	Antique and classic aircraft, located at Jefferson County International Airport
Port Townsend Marine Science Center	Port Townsend	Jefferson	Olympic Peninsula	Natural history / Aquarium	website, coastal environment and natural history
Poulsbo Historical Society Museum	Poulsbo	Kitsap	Puget Sound	History - Local	website
Poulsbo Marine Science Center	Poulsbo	Kitsap	Puget Sound	Natural history	website, marine life and ecosystems
Puget Sound Coast Artillery Museum	Port Townsend	Jefferson	Olympic Peninsula	Military	History of Fort Worden, coast artillery history and the harbor defenses of Puget Sound
Puget Sound Navy Museum	Bremerton	Kitsap	Puget Sound	Maritime	Naval heritage of the Pacific Northwest including the Puget Sound Naval Shipyard, USS John C. Stennis and more
Quilcene Historical Museum	Quilcene	Jefferson	Olympic Peninsula	History - Local	
Redmond Historical Society	Redmond	King	Puget Sound	History - Local	website, archives and displays
Renton History Museum	Renton	King	Puget Sound	History - Local	City history and culture
Ritzville Railroad Depot Museum	Ritzville	Adams	Eastern	Railroad	website, Northern Pacific Railroad depot with railroad and turn-of-the-century historic displays
Robert P Worthman Anatomy Museum	Pullman	Whitman	Eastern	Natural history	website, anatomy specimens of the College of Veterinary Medicine at Washington State University
Roslyn Museum	Roslyn	Kittitas	Central	History - Local	website, history of the former coal mining town
Rothschild House	Port Townsend	Jefferson	Olympic Peninsula	Historic house	Operated by the Jefferson County Historical Society, 19th century period house
Roy M. Chatters Newspaper and Printing Museum	Palouse	Whitman	Eastern	Media	website, operated by the Whitman County Historical Society, open by appointment, historic printing equipment
Ryan House Museum	Sumner	Pierce	Puget Sound	Historic house	Operated by the Sumner Historical Society, 1890s-period house with displays of local history
Sacajawea Interpretive Center	Pasco	Franklin	Eastern	History	Located in Sacajawea State Park, history of the Lewis and Clark Expedition, Sacajawea, and prehistoric Native American artifacts
San Juan Historical Museum	Friday Harbor	San Juan	San Juan Islands	History - Local	website, operated by the San Juan Historical Society
San Juan Island National Historical Park	Friday Harbor	San Juan	San Juan Islands	Military	Sites of the British and U.S. Armies' camps during the mid 19th-century Pig War
San Juan Islands Museum of Art	Friday Harbor	San Juan	San Juan Islands	Art	website, visual art with an emphasis on art from northwestern United States and southwestern Canada
Sand Man Tugboat	Olympia	Thurston	Puget Sound	Maritime	website, restored early 20th-century tugboat museum ship
Sarah Spurgeon Gallery	Ellensburg	Kittitas	Central	Art	website, part of Central Washington University
Scandinavian Cultural Center	Tacoma	Pierce	Puget Sound	Ethnic	website, part of Pacific Lutheran University, heritage, history, and culture of Scandinavia
Sedro-Woolley Museum	Sedro-Woolley	Skagit	Northwest	History - Local	website, exhibits include model train layout, blacksmith, bank, town hall, dentist, stable, coal mine, hospital, saloon, general store, garage, and telephone operator displays
Shafer Museum	Winthrop	Okanogan	Central	Open-air	website, pioneer complex includes a log house with pioneer household items, 1890s general store, ladies shop with dolls and clothing, mining machinery, a print shop and a school house
Shanaman Sports Museum	Tacoma	Pierce	Puget Sound	Sports	website, Washington state professional, college, high school and amateur sports teams and people
Shoreline Historical Museum	Shoreline	King	Puget Sound	History - Local	website
Sidney Museum	Port Orchard	Kitsap	Puget Sound	History - Local	website, operated by Sidney Museum and Arts Association, original Masonic Hall in Port Orchard and on the National Historic Register, features period displays of a general store, school, doctor's office and hardware store
Skagit County Historical Museum	La Conner	Skagit	Northwest	History - Local	website
Skagit-Squatch Museum	Burlington	Skagit	Northwest	Sasquatch and local history	
Slater Museum of Natural History	Tacoma	Pierce	Puget Sound	Natural history	website, part of the University of Puget Sound, research museum with public displays
Skykomish Historical Society Museum	Skykomish	King	Upper Skykomish Valley	History- Local	SkyHistory.org
Snoqualmie Valley Historical Museum	North Bend	King	Puget Sound	History - Local	website, includes pioneer and logging artifacts
South Cle Elum Depot	Cle Elum	Kittitas	Central	Railroad	Located in Iron Horse State Park
SPARK Museum of Electrical Invention	Bellingham	Whatcom	Northwest	Technology	Development and use of electricity, radio and the related inventions
Spokane House Interpretive Center	Nine Mile Falls	Spokane	Eastern	History	Located in Riverside State Park, open on weekends in summer, history of the fur trading post, military, Spokane Indians, pioneers
Spokane Valley Heritage Museum	Spokane Valley	Spokane	Eastern	History - Local	
Squaxin Island Tribe Museum Library and Research Center	Squaxin Island	Mason	Southwest	Ethnic - Native American	website, history and culture of the Squaxin Island Tribe
Stanwood Area History Museum	Stanwood	Snohomish	Puget Sound	History - Local	website, operated by the Standwood Area Historical Society
State Capital Museum	Olympia	Thurston	Puget Sound	History	website, state history and culture, Native Americans, operated by the Washington State Historical Society
Steilacoom Tribal Cultural Center & Museum	Steilacoom	Pierce	Puget Sound	Ethnic - Native American	Located in a building erected in 1902 to house the Oberlin Congregational Church.
Stillaguamish Valley Pioneer Museum	Arlington	Snohomish	Puget Sound	History - Local	website, homestead artifacts including photos, household items, logging, dairy, military, railroad, sports, medical, education, transportation music
Stonerose Interpretive Center and Fossil Site	Republic	Ferry	Eastern	Natural history	Eocene Epoch fossil site of insects, fish, leaves and twigs, bird feathers
Sunnyside Historical Museum	Sunnyside	Yakima	Central	History - Local	website, info
Suquamish Museum	Suquamish	Kitsap	Puget Sound	Ethnic - Native American	History and culture of the Puget Sound Salish Tribes
Tacoma Art Museum	Tacoma	Pierce	Puget Sound	Art	Collection includes American, European, and Asian art, highlighting Northwest artists, and traveling national and international exhibitions
Tacoma History Museum	Tacoma	Pierce	Puget Sound	History - Local	website, operated by the Tacoma Historical Society
Tacoma Pioneer Telephone Museum	Tacoma	Pierce	Puget Sound	Technology	website
Telephone Museum	Cle Elum	Kittitas	Central	Technology	website, history of telephone technology from 1901 to 1970, coal mining artifacts, operated by the Northern Kittitas County Historical Society
Tenino Depot Museum	Tenino	Thurston	Puget Sound	History - Local	Located in a depot, open on weekend afternoons
Thorp Mill	Thorp	Kittitas	Central	Mill	Restored Grist Mill https://www.thorp.org/
Two Rivers Heritage Museum	Washougal	Clark	Southwest	History - Local	website, operated by the Camas-Washougal Historical Society
USS Turner Joy Museum Ship	Bremerton	Kitsap	Puget Sound	Maritime	Navy destroyer from the Vietnam War
Verlot Ranger Station-Public Service Center	Granite Falls	Snohomish	Puget Sound	Natural history	Visitor center and museum about Mount Baker-Snoqualmie National Forest
Veterans Memorial Museum	Chehalis	Lewis	Southwest	Military	website, originally located in Centralia in 1997, the museum moved to Chehalis in 2005. Along with military equipment, contains a 9,000-square-foot (840 m^{2}) history and memorabilia gallery focusing on local veterans, as well as soldiers killed in action, who served in wars or military engagements.
Vintage Motorcycle Museum	Chehalis	Lewis	Southwest	Transportation	Collection includes pre-1916 motorcycles, photographs, and memorabilia. Manufacturers include Emblem, Indian Motorcycle, Pierce and Thomas. The oldest motorcycle cataloged is a 1900 Thomas; collection includes a rare 1914 IMP Cyclecar. The museum contains non-motorized bicycles as well as motorcycles post-1916.
Wahkiakum County Historical Society Museum	Cathlamet	Wahkiakum	Southwest	History - Local	information
Wanapum Heritage Center	Wanapum Dam	Grant	Central	Ethnic - Native American	website, history and culture of the Wanapum, area history
Washington National Guard Museum	Camp Murray	Pierce	Puget Sound	Military	History of the Washington National Guard
Washington State History Museum	Tacoma	Pierce	Puget Sound	History	Washington's history and culture
Washington State University Geology Museums	Pullman	Whitman	Eastern	Geology	website, part of Washington State University, displays in three buildings
Washington State University Museum of Anthropology	Pullman	Whitman	Eastern	Anthropology	website, part of Washington State University, archaeological and ethnographic artifacts
Washington State University Museum of Art	Pullman	Whitman	Eastern	Art	website, part of Washington State University, modern and contemporary art
West Coast Clock & Watch Museum	Bellingham	Whatcom	Northwest	Horology	website, located on the third floor of the Whatcom Museum, pocket watches, clocks and horological tools
Westport Maritime Museum	Westport	Grays Harbor	Southwest	Maritime	website, located in a former U.S. Coast Guard lifeboat station, exhibits include the Coast Guard, Grays Harbor Light, whales and whaling, marine life and ecosystems, fishing industry, cranberry growing
Wenatchee Valley Museum & Cultural Center	Wenatchee	Chelan	Central	Multiple	Local history, art, culture and natural history
Western Gallery	Bellingham	Whatcom	Northwest	Art	website, part of Western Washington University, contemporary art gallery and outdoor sculpture collection
Whale Museum	Friday Harbor	San Juan	San Juan Islands	Natural history	Natural history of marine mammals with a special focus on orcas
Whatcom Museum	Bellingham	Whatcom	Northwest	Multiple	Contemporary art, Northwest history and culture, natural history, West Coast Clock and Watch Museum
White Bluffs Quilt Museum	Richland	Benton	Central	Textile	website, regional textile arts center
White River Valley Museum	Auburn	King	Puget Sound	History - Local	Exhibits include 1920s period depot, Japanese American farmhouse, Main Street and hotel displays, Native American and pioneer artifacts,
White Pass Country Historical Museum	Packwood	Lewis	Southwest	History	White Pass Country Museum website located in a 1938 elementary school house. Local artifacts to bring back memories of yesteryear.
Whitman Mission National Historic Site	Walla Walla	Walla Walla	Eastern	History	Park and visitor museum about the 1847 massacre of Methodist missionaries
Whoop-n-Holler Museum	Bickleton	Klickitat	Central	History	Collection of antique cars and vehicles, household items, tools, and agricultural exhibits
Willapa Bay Oyster House Interpretive Center	Nahcotta	Pacific	Southwest	Maritime	website, features replica of the residence of oystermen and their families, exhibits about the oyster industry
Willapa Seaport Museum	Raymond	Pacific	Southwest	Maritime	Includes photographs, paintings, drawings, ship models, and artifacts used in working, sailing and navigating ships website
World Kite Museum	Long Beach	Pacific	Southwest	Sports	website, history of kites, kitemakers and famous kite fliers
Yakama Nation Museum	Toppenish	Yakima	Central	Ethnic - Native American	website, history and culture of the Yakama
Yakima Electric Railway Museum	Yakima	Yakima	Central	Railroad	Electric trolleys
Yakima Valley Museum	Yakima	Yakima	Central	History / Natural history	Includes area natural history, American Indian culture, pioneer life, early city life, fruit industry
Ye Olde Curiosity Shop	Seattle	King	Puget Sound	History - Local & Global	Locally owned since its opening in 1899 Includes museum items from around the world including real mummies and shrunken heads and various local artifacts too. website

== Defunct museums ==
- Aurora Valentinetti Puppet Museum, website, closed November 12, 2023
- Bellevue Arts Museum, closed September 4, 2024
- Camp 6 Logging Museum, Tacoma, closed in 2011
- Castle Rock Exhibit Hall, Castle Rock, closed in 2014
- Children's Activity Museum, Ellensburg, closed in 2014
- Columbia River Exhibition of History, Science, and Technology, Richland, closed in 2014
- Consolidated Works - Seattle
- Fairchild Heritage Museum & Air Park, closed in 2002
- Rosalie Whyel Museum of Doll Art, Bellevue, closed in 2012
- Three Rivers Children's Museum, Richland
- Washington State Railroads Historical Society Museum, Pasco
- Western Bridge, Seattle

== See also ==
- List of museums in Seattle, Washington
- Aquaria in Washington (category)
- Nature Centers in Washington
- List of historical societies in Washington (state)
