= NHF =

NHF is a three-letter acronym that may refer to the following organisations:

- National Hairdressers' Federation
- National Health Federation
- National Heritage Foundation
- National Housing Federation
- Nazia Hassan Foundation
- Norwegian Association of the Disabled (Norges Handikapforbund)
