= Kingsbrook, Bedford =

Area of Bedford, England

Coordinates: 52.12261°N 0.44239°W

Kingsbrook
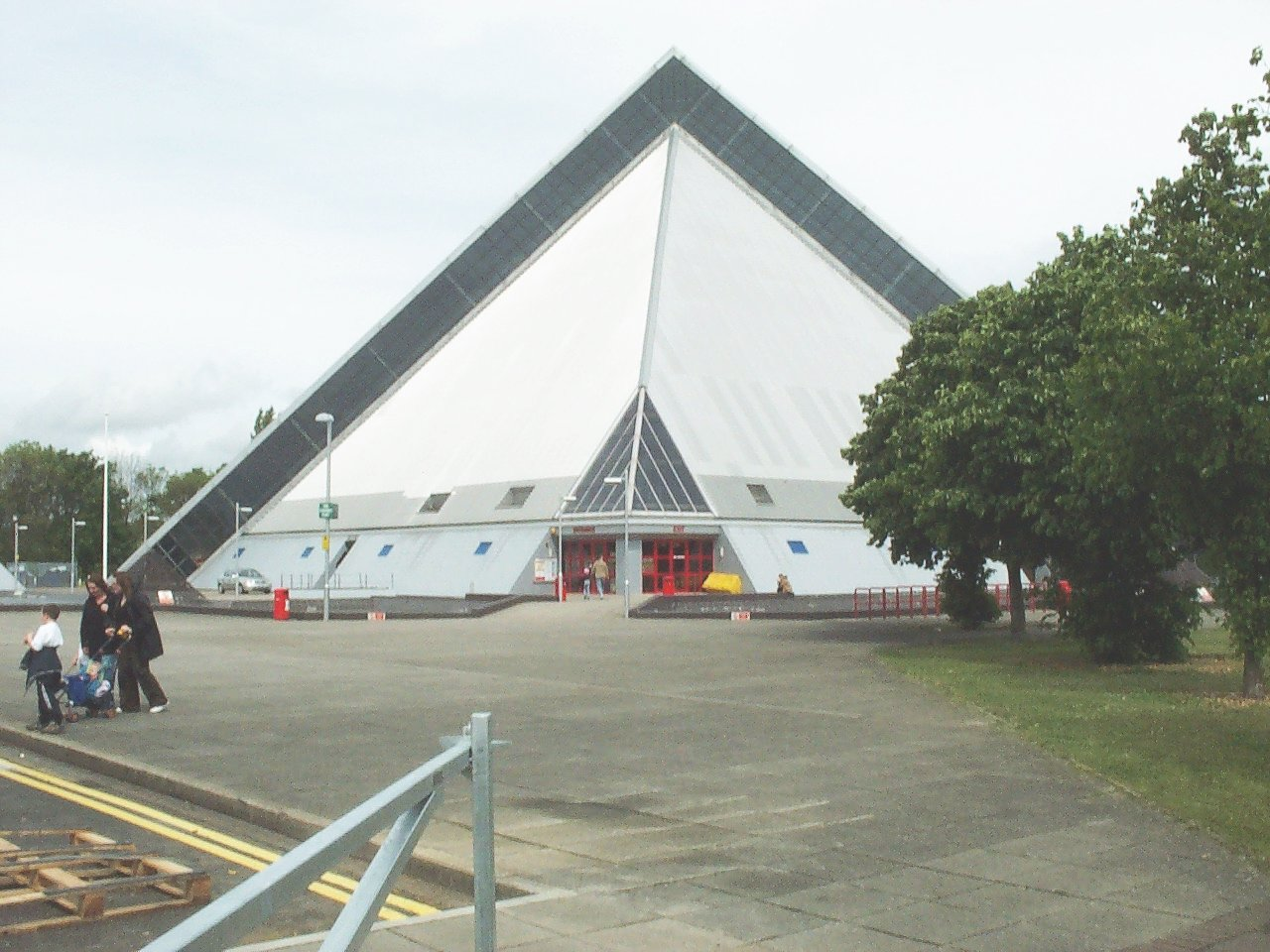
- Oasis Beach Pool that permanently closed in 2024 is located in Kingsbrook.

- Location within Bedfordshire
- Population: 9,134; 9,035 (2011 Census. Ward)
- OS grid reference: TL067482
- Unitary authority: Bedford
- Ceremonial county: Bedfordshire
- Region: East
- Country: England
- Sovereign state: United Kingdom
- Post town: BEDFORD
- Postcode district: MK42, MK44
- Dialling code: 01234
- Police: Bedfordshire
- Fire: Bedfordshire
- Ambulance: East of England
- UK Parliament: Bedford

Kingsbrook is an electoral ward and area within the town of Bedford, England.

The boundaries of Kingsbrook are approximately the River Great Ouse and Priory Country Park to the north, Cambridge Road and the A421 to the south and east, with Redwood Grove and Willow Road to the west.

The Fenlake and Silver Jubilee neighbourhoods are both part of the Kingsbrook ward, as is the Priory Business Park and the Cambridge Road Industrial Estate. Kingsbrook is the largest ward (in terms of population) in Bedford.

== History ==
There is evidence of a late Neolithic or early Bronze Age settlement and ritual site, located next to the Bunyan Centre in Kingsbrook. Excavations in 1995 uncovered three skeletons and a complete Beaker pot.

There was some settlement in the northern part of Kingsbrook (by the river) in the 19th century. However the area was not properly developed until the 20th century, with the construction of the Silver Jubilee neighbourhood in the 1930s, which was named after the Silver Jubilee of King George V in 1935. The final part of southern Kingsbrook was settled by the 1970s, and named Fenlake.

== Governance ==
Kingsbrook is an unparished area of Bedford, with all community services under the direct control of Bedford Borough Council. Kingsbrook elects two councillors to Bedford Borough Council, currently, after the 2015 election, one is Labour and the other Liberal Democrat.

== Economy ==
There are many local shops and services located on London Road, including a supermarket, petrol station, post office and a bakery. There is a large Tesco superstore sited on Cardington Road, as well as the Barns Hotel.

There are two large business parks in Kingsbrook. The first is the Cambridge Road Industrial Estate which houses many companies including Fujifilm. The second is Priory Business Park on Cardington Road, which houses many other firms including the head offices of Autoglass and the National Hairdressers' Federation.

== Education ==
There is one primary school in Kingsbrook - King's Oak Primary School located on Canvin Way and Oak Road. King's Oak Primary School was formed in September 2014 from an amalgamation of Stephenson Lower School (Canvin Way) and Harrowden Middle School (Oak Road).

The main secondary school in Kingsbrook is Bedford Academy sited on Mile Road.

== Religious sites ==
- Christ the King Roman Catholic Church, located on Harrowden Road
- St Michael's and All Angels Church (Church of England), located on Barford Avenue
- The Bedford Nirankari Satsung Bhawan Sikh Temple, located on Cardington Road
- There is a Kingdom Hall for Jehovah's Witnesses on Goodmayes Close
- Christ United Pentecostal Church holds meetings at the Jubilation Centre situated on Moulton Avenue
- The Redeemed Christian Church of God also holds meetings at the Jubilation Centre situated on Moulton Avenue

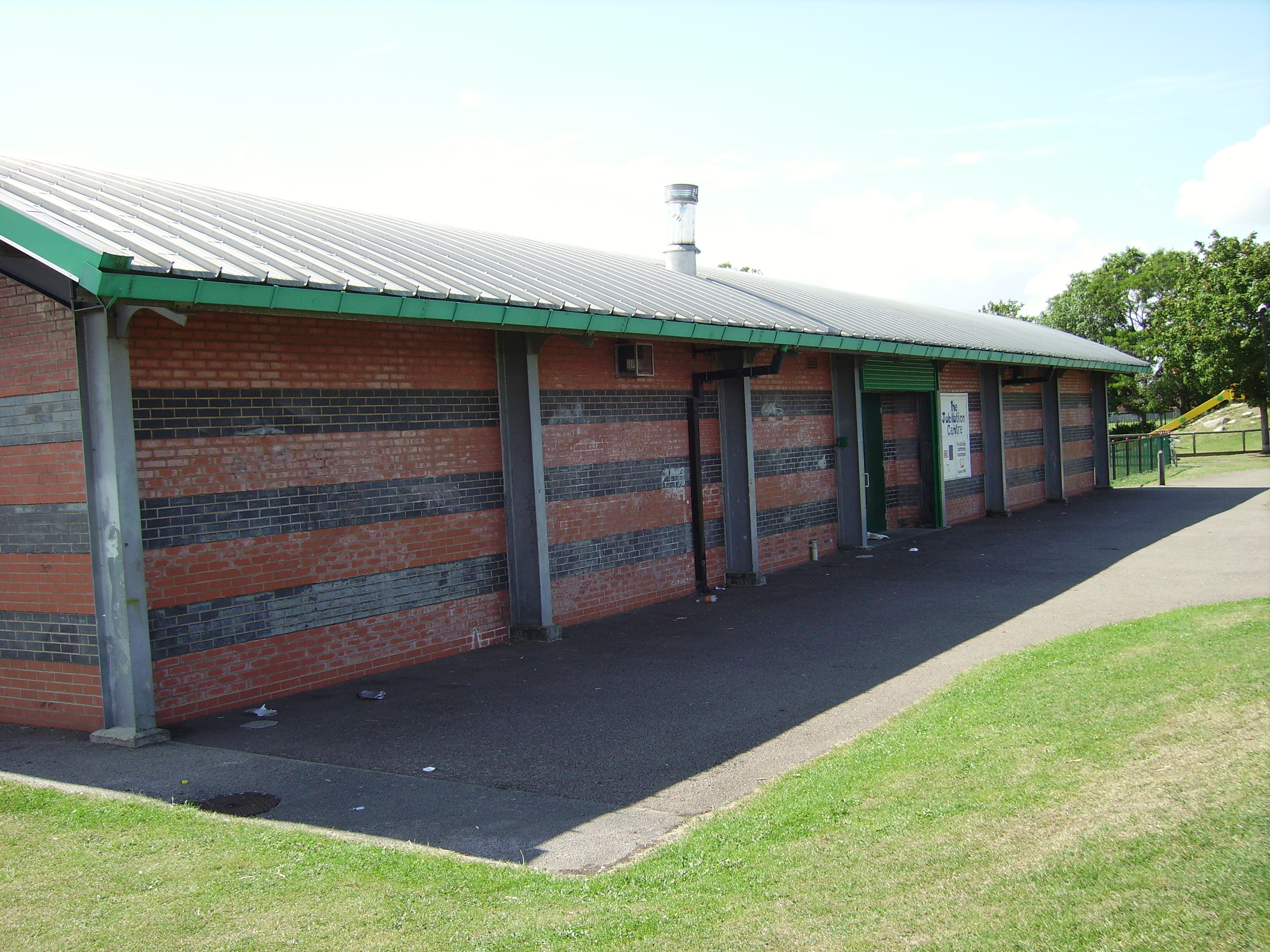
Jubilation Centre

== Community facilities ==
Kingsbrook's open spaces include Jubilee Park on Canvin Way, and Fenlake Meadows on Cardington Road. There are two community centres in the area - The first is Scott Hall Community Centre located on Barford Avenue, and the second is the Jubilation Centre situated on Moulton Avenue.

The Oasis Beach Pool ( public swimming pool) closed in late 2024 is situated on Cardington Road. The Bunyan Centre is a leisure centre situated on Mile Road. The centre acts as a main sports venue for the whole of south Bedford.
