= Nutcracker doll =

Toy of German origin

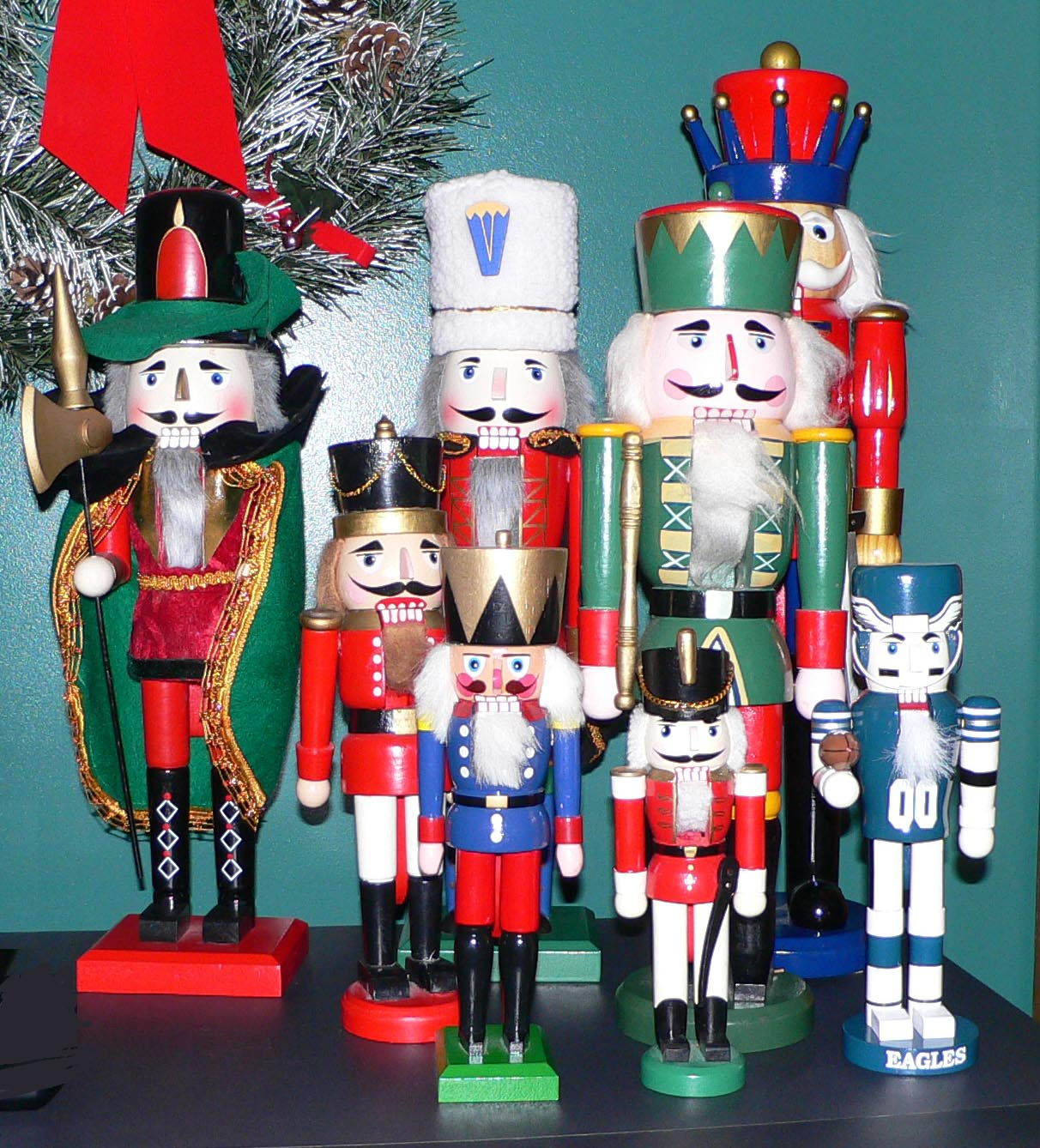
Display of nutcracker dolls

Nutcracker dolls, also known as Christmas nutcrackers, are decorative nutcracker figurines most commonly made to resemble a toy soldier. In German tradition, the dolls were created as representatives of the reigning class (e.g.: kings, soldiers). Portraying them as cracking nuts with their teeth was political critique and satire. While nearly all nutcrackers from before the first half of the 20th century are functional, a significant proportion of modern nutcrackers are primarily decorative, and not able to crack nuts.

== History ==
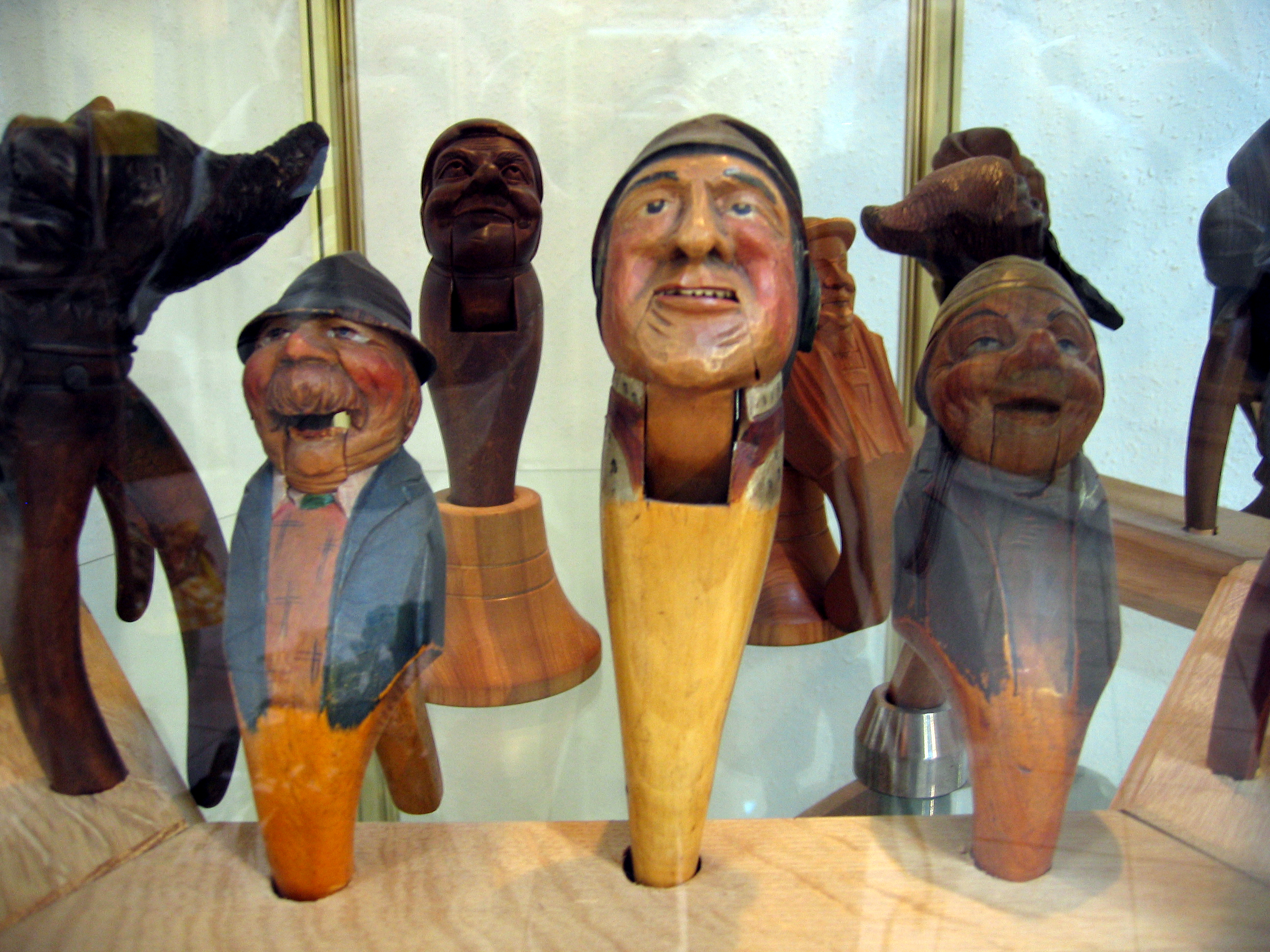
Original nutcracker dolls from Nussknacker Museum in Neuhausen, Saxony

Nutcracker dolls originate from late-17th-century Germany, particularly the Ore Mountains (German: Erzgebirge) region. One origin story attributes the creation of the first nutcracker doll to a craftsman from Seiffen. They were often given as gifts, and at some point they became associated with Christmas season. They grew in popularity around the 19th century and spread to nearby European countries. As the demand grew, nutcracker doll production also began on a mass scale in factories. Friedrich Wilhelm Füchtner (1844–1923), commonly known in Germany as "father of the nutcracker", began the first mass production of the design (using a lathe) at his workshop in Seiffen in Saxony during 1872.

Decorative nutcracker dolls began being popularized outside of Europe after the Second World War, when numerous American soldiers stationed in Germany came home to the United States with German nutcrackers as souvenirs. Further popularization came from Pyotr Ilyich Tchaikovsky's The Nutcracker, an 1892 ballet adaptation of E. T. A. Hoffmann's 1816 story "The Nutcracker and the Mouse King", which features a toy soldier nutcracker. The ballet, introduced to America during the mid-20th century, became a favorite holiday tradition across the United States and helped make nutcracker dolls a Christmas decoration and a seasonal icon across Western culture.

== Design ==
An average handcrafted nutcracker doll is made out of about 60 separate pieces. Nutcracker dolls traditionally resemble toy soldiers, and are often painted in bright colors. Different designs proliferated early; by the early 19th century there were ones dressed as miners, policemen, kings, royalty or soldiers from different armies. More recent variations have been made to resemble various pop-culture or historical figurines, from Benjamin Franklin to Operation Desert Storm-uniformed American soldiers.

== See also ==
- Leavenworth Nutcracker Museum
