= List of museums in Washington =

List of museums in Washington may refer to:

- List of museums in Washington (state)
- List of museums in Washington, D.C.
