= Leavenworth Nutcracker Museum =

Museum in the state of Washington

Coordinates: 47°35′41″N 120°39′45″W

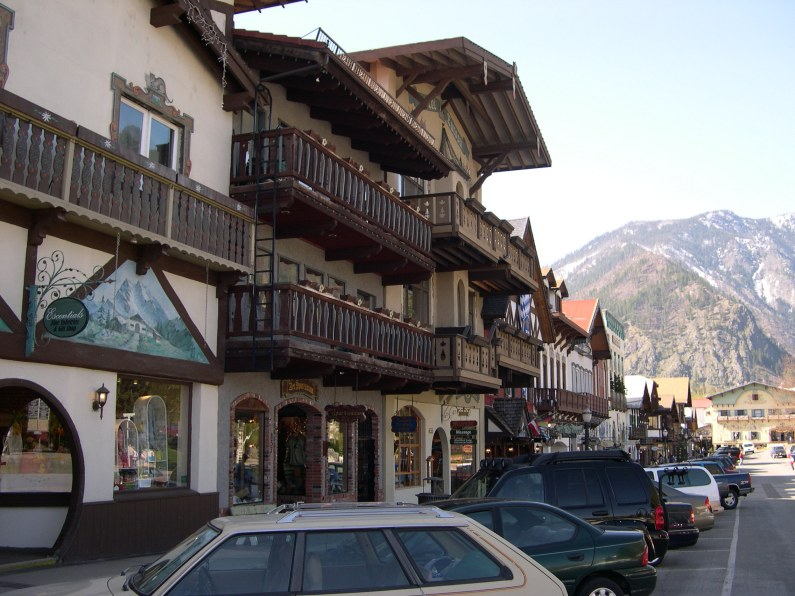
- The Leavenworth Nutcracker Museum, Leavenworth Washington
- Established: 1995
- Location: 735 Front Street; Leavenworth, Washington; United States
- Type: Non-profit
- Collection size: 9103 nutcrackers
- Curator: Arlene Wagner
- Website: www.nutcrackermuseum.com

Leavenworth Nutcracker Museum is a museum dedicated to nutcrackers and nutcracking devices, located in Leavenworth, Washington. Founded by Arlene Wagner and her husband George in 1995, the museum housed over 7,000 nutcrackers in 2020, and over 9,000 in 2023. Wagner taught multiple productions of The Nutcracker and became enamored with nutcrackers. She began collecting them during the 1960s. The 5,000-square-foot museum is of a Bavarian style with two floors open to the public.

Wagner came to be known as "the Nutcracker Lady". The museum was featured on the NBC program Today in 2000. In 2001, the museum became a part of the National Heritage Foundation. David Evangelista favorably reviewed the museum in a piece for an A&E Network special in 2003. Wagner wrote a book, The Art and Character of Nutcrackers, which discusses 1,000 pieces from the museum. In December 2009, the museum was featured on the "Sunday Morning" program of CBS News. On November 8, 2010, Wagner became the first guest featured on Conan O'Brien's late-night television program on TBS, Conan.

The Leavenworth Nutcracker Museum received favorable reception in the book You Know You're in Washington When..., in which the authors recommended it as the best location to learn about the art and engineering of nutcrackers. Wagner's book The Art and Character of Nutcrackers was also given positive mention in the book. Wagner was consulted as a resource for the book Nutcracker Nation. Authors Ken and Dahlynn McKowen recommended the museum in their book Best of Oregon & Washington's Mansions Museums & More.

== History ==
The curator of the museum is Arlene Wagner. Wagner (born 1925) founded the Leavenworth Nutcracker Museum with her husband George in 1995, as a non-profit organization. Wagner had previously worked as a ballet instructor, and supervised productions of The Nutcracker. The museum's website notes, "just as Clara in the ballet became entranced with the wooden figure with the big teeth, so did Arlene." She started her collection of the toy soldiers as a child. During the 1960s, Wagner began to purchase various kinds of nutcrackers. The museum's building is of a Bavarian style and is of an area of 5,000 square feet;

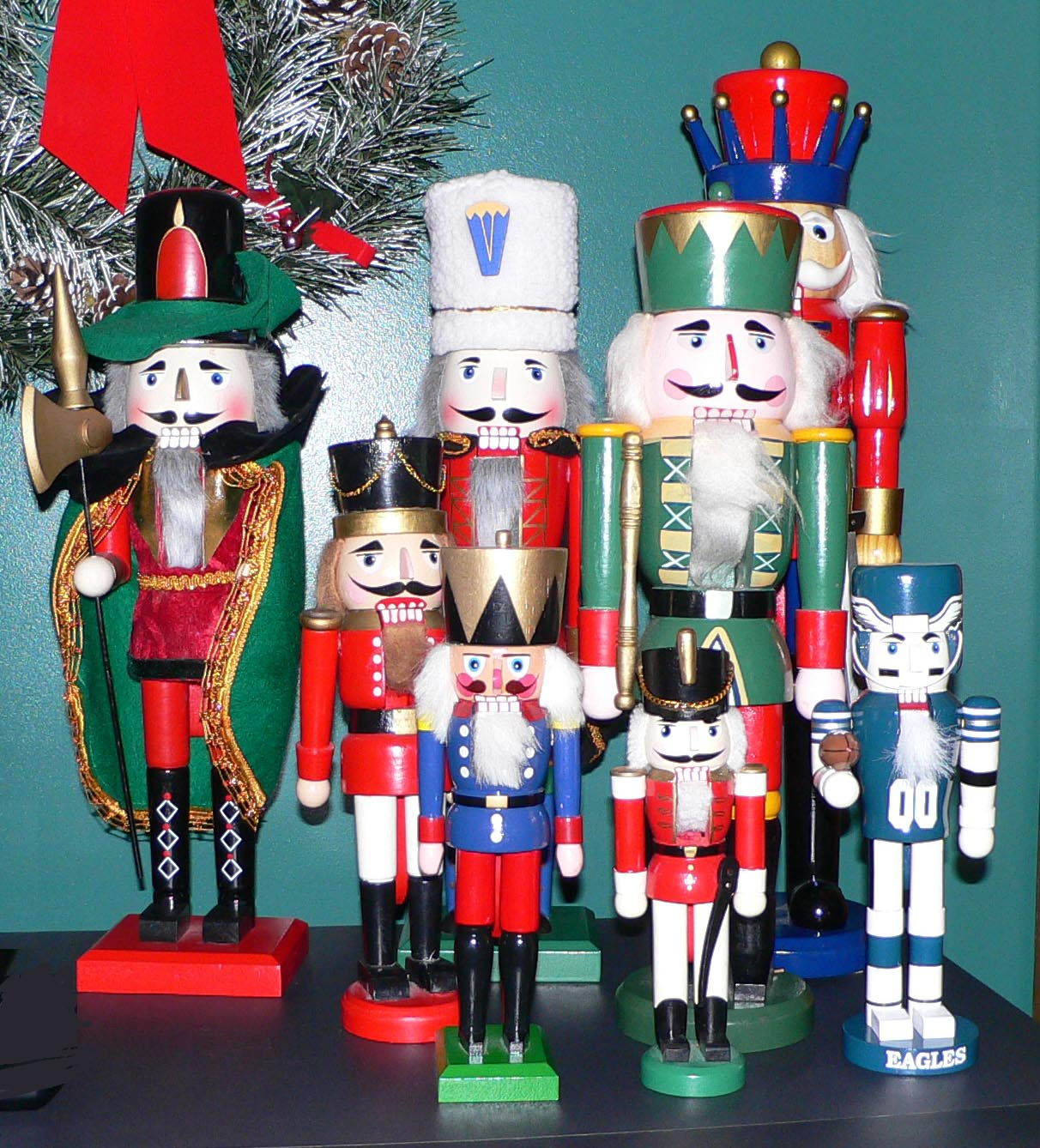
Assorted nutcrackers. In 2010, the Leavenworth Nutcracker Museum contained over 6,000 nutcrackers, with some dating to the 16th century.

Wagner came to be known as "the Nutcracker Lady". The museum was featured on the NBC program Today in 2000. Arlene and George Wagner ceded their collection in 2001 to the National Heritage Foundation so that the museum would be maintained in the event of their deaths; however Arlene Wagner retained her position within the museum. David Evangelista favorably reviewed the museum in a piece for an A&E Network special in 2003. In 2003, the museum had a collection of 3,028 artifacts. By 2007 the collection had grown to over 5,000 pieces. In 2010, it contained over 6,000 nutcrackers, including pieces from the 16th century, and by September, 2021, the museum was featured in Guinness World Records with an astounding amount of nutcracking devices, exceeding 9,000 nutcrackers. Nutcrackers are represented in the museum from 38 different countries. The museum contains the greatest amount of collected nutcrackers in the United States, including a nutcracker named Karl made in Germany that stands six feet tall. Karl the nutcracker was manufactured for Wagner by Karl Roppl from Oberammergau, Germany, and made from a solid piece of linden wood.

A bronze Roman piece c. 200 BC to 200 AD, discovered in 1960, is one of the oldest in the museum. Wagner bought the item from Rik Gijsen, a Netherlands-based antiquities dealer. The piece was acquired by the museum in April 2006. Approximately 1,000 of the nutcrackers from the museum are highlighted in a book by Wagner, The Art and Character of Nutcrackers. The museum is open to visitors everyday of the year even holidays. Arlene and George Wagner traveled the globe in search of nutcrackers for the museum: "That's all we do! My husband and I have never been on a cruise. We just got back from Europe yesterday, hunting for nutcrackers. We went to the Netherlands. We attended a couple of very big European antique shows. We also had nutcrackers waiting for us to pick up – very valuable 16th and 17th century ones."

In December 2009, Wagner and her museum were featured on the "Sunday Morning" program of CBS News. Judith Hole, a CBS News producer, discovered the museum through an online search, and got in touch with the curator for further research on the news piece. Journalist Rita Braver of CBS interviewed Wagner about the museum. A CBS camera crew filmed inside the museum and documented its collection. Wagner observed, "they took pictures and asked questions – everything from the nutting stones that are supposedly from 4,000 to 8000 years old, clear up to the modern ones." She noted of the CBS crew, "They were very interested in the old ones, and how the 'Nutcracker' ballet influenced the collecting of nutcrackers in America."

Wagner appeared as the first guest on the premiere of Conan O'Brien's TBS program Conan, on November 8, 2010. On his website, O'Brien had arranged an online survey of potential first guests with Wagner being listed on the website among candidates including Jack Nicholson, Pope Benedict XVI, Justin Bieber, Lady Gaga, Vladimir Putin, and the Sultan of Brunei. During the poll, O'Brien posted to his Twitter account, "If the Nutcracker lady wins, I'm in trouble." In an interview with KING-TV, Wagner replied, "Why would he be in trouble? I think I should do just fine on his show." She noted the production staff of Conan had contacted her, "They just called us out of the blue." She explained, "Many people think nutcrackers are just for Christmas, but they're not." Wagner stated she intended to present O'Brien with a gift of an Irish nutcracker from her collection.

== Reception ==
Writing in You Know You're in Washington When..., Sharon Wootton and Maggie Savage characterize the Leavenworth Nutcracker Museum as, "The best place in America to admire nutcracker mechanics, art, and creativity". The authors write of Wagner's book The Art and Character of Nutcrackers, "It shows the breadth of construction styles and materials, often capturing the cultural milieu behind each nutcracker's form." Wagner's work is used as a reference in the book Nutcracker Nation by Jennifer Fisher. The museum is recommended in the book Best of Oregon & Washington's Mansions Museums & More. Authors Ken and Dahlynn McKowen note, "This is a fun museum in a fun town." Arlene Wagner is regarded as a "national authority" on the subject of nutcrackers.

== See also ==
- Leavenworth, Washington
- List of museums in Washington
