= Calvin S. Barlow =

Pioneer in Tacoma, Washington (1856–1920)

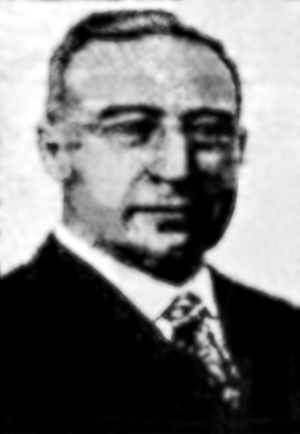

Member of the Washington House of Representatives from the 35th district
- In office 1897–1899

Member of the Washington House of Representatives from the 37th district
- In office 1915–1917

Personal details
- Born: May 13, 1856 (Note: The date is given based on Edmond Meany's account and Barlow's Find a Grave page; however another source, apparently erroneously, lists May 13, 1856 as Barlow's date of birth.) Cowlitz County, Washington
- Died: April 5, 1920 (aged 63) Tacoma, Washington
- Party: Republican
- Spouse: Hertilla M. Burr (married 1881–1920)
- Children: George C.; Harry L.; Byron T.; Allan; Russell C.; Douglas L.; Hertilla; Mildred M.
- Education: Portland Business college
- Occupation: Tacoma Trading Company (secretary, treasurer, president); member of the Tacoma City Council; member of the Washington State Legislature; Washington State Historical Society (curator); Pierce County Pioneers' Association (president); Ferry Museum (curator)
- Known for: Developed the butcher and merchandise businesses in Tacoma, Washington. Founded the Tacoma Trading Company (later C. S. Barlow & Sons). Was a member of the Tacoma City Council and a member of the Washington State Legislature during two separate terms. Participated in the political and social life of the city and in its industrial development.

Calvin Sam Barlow (May 13, 1856 – April 5, 1920) was a pioneer and politician of Tacoma, Washington. He was considered one of the most successful merchants of the city. In 1877, he came to Tacoma–a small village at the time–and opened its first butcher shop. Barlow successfully conducted the business for three years in partnership with his brother. Later, they founded the Tacoma Trading Company (later, C. S. Barlow & Sons) and started dealing in various building materials as well as manufacturing their own. In 1903, their company was one of the largest in the city, and one of the leading merchants. It was stated that the company supplied near three-fourths of the lime for all of the Tacoma buildings of that time. Over the years, Barlow became a highly esteemed Tacoma merchant.

As a politician, Barlow was an active and member of the Republican party. He was a member of the City Council and was twice elected to the Washington State Legislature. He was first elected in 1897 during the mainly Populist victories. Barlow was one of the founders of the tax system, one of the charter members and trustees of the Tacoma Chamber of Commerce, a member of the Washington Supreme Court bench, and a member of the Washington State Board of Visitation for prisons.

Barlow was considered one of the best-known Tacoma citizens. He was a member and founder of the first Tacoma military organization and a member of the board of trustees for Puget Sound University. He invested in real estate, mining, and other establishments, erected a building on Jefferson Avenue, and was a member and a leader of a number of organizations, including the Washington State Historical Society, the Pierce County Pioneers' Association, the Tacoma Commercial Club, and others.

== Early life and family ==
Calvin Barlow was born in Cowlitz County, a few miles west of Kelso, Washington, on May 13, 1856. His parents were George Barlow and Mary Ann Barlow (Purdy).

Barlow's ancestors were Englishmen who emigrated to America in the 1630s. Barlow's father worked on the Erie Canal as the captain of a commercial boat, and in 1830 became a Michigan pioneer. Later with his wife, he crossed the plains to Portland, Oregon. From there, they eventually moved to Cowlitz County in Washington State.

Barlow spent his childhood in a family home in Cowlitz County, helping his father farm. He was one of nine children in the family. Among his siblings were Byron Barlow, a pioneer of Tacoma who took an active part in that city's development, and George W. Barlow a well-known steamboat captain on Puget Sound and the Columbia River.

== Education and first job ==
Barlow studied in Forest Grove, Oregon, schools. He attended Pacific University, one of the first universities of Oregon, for one year. Later, he entered the Portland Business College. In order to pay for his education, Barlow spent five years working as a salmon fisherman on the Columbia River. He graduated in 1877 at the age of 21, and moved to Tacoma.

== Career ==
=== Butcher business ===
In 1877, (Note: 1877 is the year that was published during Barlow's life by a number of sources. However, in his obituary, and in another, later source, the year of his arrival in Tacoma is 1879.) Barlow became a pioneer of Tacoma, then a small village. There, in partnership with his brother Byron, Barlow started the city's first butcher shop. They worked in the business successfully for three years. Later, they decided to establish the Tacoma Trading Company.

=== Tacoma Trading Company ===
The Tacoma Trading Company was founded in 1882 and incorporated on August 21, 1883(one book gives 1893 as the year of the incorporation, possibly as a typo). Barlow worked as company's secretary and treasurer; later, he became president. In later years, three of Barlow brothers became partners, and the company name was changed to the C. S. Barlow & Sons. Three of Barlow's sons (George, Allan, and Russell) also joined the business.

By 1903, the company had become one of the largest in the city, and its building was considered "the oldest and largest house of its kind." The company sold a vast array of building materials, including sewer pipes, coal, lime, plaster, cement, sand, gravel, and more. Prosser, founder of the Washington State Historical Society, stated that by 1903, the company supplied about "three-fourths of all the lime used in the buildings" that were built in Tacoma. The company was thought to be one of the leading firms of the city in the business.

In 1904, Barlow loaned money for the development of a brickyard on Fox Island, from which he purchased bricks. Two years later, he bought the yard, paying $2,900 ($4,400 in 2020 dollars (Note: The approximate value converted to 2020 dollars, based on a standard adjustment of the 1913 dollar value using the Consumer Price Index as calculated by United States Department of Labor.)). The brickyard was originally founded in 1884, and over the years changed names, owners, and managers several times. The brickyard's land had a variety of quality clay deposits, and manufactured products used by towns and cities in Washington and Oregon. The brickyard was closed during the U.S. economic Depression of 1893, and re-opened in 1897.

Barlow invested $30,000 ($46,000) in a brick dryer to be able to manufacture bricks all year long, instead of only during the summer months, when the bricks dried in the open air. But concrete was becoming more popular in the building business, and in 1910 or 1911, Barlow closed the brick business.

Barlow remained president of the Tacoma Trading Company until his death in 1920. During his years in business, he was known as a "prominent Tacoma merchant" and "one of the most successful dealers in his field."

=== Other activity and positions ===
Barlow took part in the development of a number of Tacoma industries. In 1881, he co-founded the Tacoma's first military organization. He invested heavily in real estate and mining, as well as other enterprises. In 1888, Barlow built a cottage with a companion on Jefferson Avenue, called Queen Ann. From 1888 to 1903, Barlow was a member of the board of trustees for the Puget Sound University.

Barlow served as a curator for the Washington State Historical Society and for the Ferry Museum. He was a member and president of the Pierce County Pioneers' Association. His civic activities made him one of "the best-known Tacoma citizens."

== Political activity ==
Barlow actively supported and promoted the Republican party, and his opinion was taken into account by party councils.

One of Barlow's first steps in the development of the city's law structure was to work on the first accurate tax system framework. He worked on it in 1883 with a colleague, Levi Shelton. In 1884, Barlow became a member of the Tacoma City Council, and in 1897, a charter member and trustee of the Tacoma Chamber of Commerce. He was also a member of the Washington State Board of Visitation for prisons.

Barlow served two terms in the Washington State Legislature. He first became a member of the House of Representatives in 1897, one of the few successful Republican candidates elected during the pinnacle of the Populist party (a left-wing agrarian populist late-19th-century political party in the United States). In 1909, he became a member of the supreme bench of the Washington State.

In 1915, Barlow was elected to the legislature for the second time. He was one of nine newly elected legislators who were born in Washington State. By this time, the state had existed for twenty five years, and the number of native members elected was "regarded as unusually strong."

== Memberships ==
Barlow was one of the first members of the Knights of Pythias lodge of Tacoma, and was identified with the Maccabees, Odd Fellows and United Artisans. He was also a member of the Pierce County Pioneers' Association and a member of the Seattle Commercial Club.

Barlow and his wife were members of the First Methodist Episcopal Church. He was a church trustee and a delegate to its General Conference at Cleveland.

== Personal life ==
On April 28, 1881, Barlow married Hertilla M. Burr, a daughter of state pioneers who were the Barlows' neighbors in Cowlitz County. Barlow and Hertilla had eight children. George C., born in 1882, was later a secretary under his father's management in the Tacoma Trading Company. Harry L. was born on April 21, 1885, and died in August 1887; Byron T. was born February 1, 1888, and died April 1889; Allan was born on August 15, 1890; Russell C., born on November 10, 1893; Douglas L., born on December 23, 1895; Hertilla, born on June 7, 1898; and Mildred M., born on December 29, 1901.

Calvin Barlow died on April 5, 1920, at his home in Tacoma, after suffering from an illness for two days.

== See also ==
- Cowlitz County, Washington
- Washington House of Representatives
- Washington State Historical Society
- Pacific University

== Literature cited ==
- "CPI Inflation Calculator", Bureau of Labor Statistics, Washington: United States Department of Labor
- "Pioneers tell of severe winters in early days", Seattle Post-Intelligencer, Seattle: Leigh S. J. Hunt, p. 10, January 14, 1909, ISSN 2379-7304, LCCN sn83045604, OCLC 9563195
- "Tacoma", The Spokesman-Review, Spokane: Cowles Company, p. 2, January 19, 1909, ISSN 1064-7317, LCCN sn84024754, OCLC 11102610
- Scripps, Edward, ed. (May 1, 1914), "Well known Tacoma people on jury in damage case", The Tacoma Times, Tacoma: E. W. Scripps Company, p. 1, ISSN 2158-4729, LCCN sn88085187, OCLC 17347623
- "C. S. Barlow succumbs", Seattle Daily Times, Seattle: The Seattle Times Company, p. 13, April 6, 1920, ISSN 2639-4898, LCCN sn86072007, OCLC 1765328
- "C. S. Barlow, prominent Tacoma merchant, dies", Spokane Chronicle, Spokane: Cowles Company, p. 15, April 6, 1920, LCCN sn86072020, OCLC 14374699
- Jackson, Sam, ed. (April 11, 1920), "Kelso Taylor Mill company installing derrick at plant", The Oregon Daily Journal, Portland: Journal Print Co., p. 12, LCCN sn85042444, OCLC 12429002
- "Fox Island Brickyard", Harbor History Museum Blog, Gig Harbor: Harbor History Museum, April 24, 2014
- Farrar, Victor J. (January 1, 1920), Bagley, Clarence B.; Meany, Edmond S.; Elliott, T. C.; Golder, Frank A.; Lewis, William S.; Howay, Frederic William; Lyman, William Denison; McElroy, H. B.; McMahon, Edward; Sperlin, O. B. (eds.), "Pioneer and Historical Societies of the State of Washington", The Washington Historical Quarterly, XI (1), Seattle: Washington University State Historical Society: 37–43, ISSN 0361-6223, JSTOR 40473891, LCCN 2001206631, OCLC 2104676
- Hunt, Herbert (1916), Tacoma its history and its builders; a half century of activity, vol. 1, Chicago: S. J. Clarke Publishing Company, LCCN 18005073, OCLC 656923949
- Hunt, Herbert; Kaylor, Floyd C. (1917), Washington, west of the Cascades; historical and descriptive; the explorers, the Indians, the pioneers, the modern, Chicago: S. J. Clarke Publishing Company, LCCN 18015511, OCLC 10086413
- Mattison, M. M. (January 8, 1915), Blethen, Alden J. (ed.), "Nine native sons have places in legislature", Seattle Daily Times, Seattle: The Seattle Times Company, p. 10, ISSN 2639-4898, LCCN sn86072007, OCLC 1765328
- Meany, Edmond S. (November 3, 1919), "Living pioneers of Washington", Seattle Post-Intelligencer, Seattle: Leigh S. J. Hunt, p. 6, ISSN 0746-6307, LCCN sn83045736, OCLC 9699548
- Prosser, William Farrand (1903), Lewis, Edward Gardner (ed.), A history of the Puget Sound country, its resources, its commerce and its people, New York City: Edward Gardner Lewis, LCCN 05013767
