= List of nature centers in Washington =

This is a list of nature centers and environmental education centers in the state of Washington.

Name	Location	County	Region	Summary
Adriana Hess Audubon Center	University Place	Pierce	Puget Sound	located in Adriana Hess Wetland Park, operated by the Tahoma Audubon Society
Camp Long (Seattle, Washington)	Seattle	King	Puget Sound	operated by the City of Seattle, 68 acres, park and nature center, environmental education and rock climbing classes
Carkeek Park	Seattle	King	Puget Sound	216 acres, operated by the City, center open for programs or rentals only
Cedar River Watershed Education Center	North Bend	King	Puget Sound	regional education facility about the Cedar River watershed, located on Rattlesnake Lake, operated by Seattle Public Utilities
Coastal Interpretive Center	Ocean Shores	Grays Harbor	Southwest	hands-on natural history museum, also exhibits about culture of coastal living, geology
Dash Point State Park	Federal Way	King	Puget Sound	398 acres, nature center opened in 2012
Discovery Park	Seattle	King	Puget Sound	534 acres, operated by the City, features the Discovery Park Environmental Learning Center
Dungeness River Audubon Center	Sequim	Clallam	Olympic Peninsula	located in Railroad Bridge Park
Feiro Marine Life Center	Port Angeles	Clallam	Olympic Peninsula	aquarium and marine environmental education and conservation
Forest Learning Center	Mount St. Helens	Skamania		operated by Weyerhaeuser, exhibits on the eruption of Mount St. Helens, forest recovery, reforestation and conservation of forest resources
Fox Island Nature Center	Fox Island	Pierce	Puget Sound	5 acres, operated by the community
IslandWood	Bainbridge Island	Kitsap	Puget Sound	255 acres, outdoor learning center
Lake Hills Greenbelt Ranger Station	Bellevue	King	Puget Sound	An educational visitor center that provides information, environmental programs, p-patch garden plots, master gardener demonstration gardens, and interpretive displays.
Lewis Creek Park Visitor Center	Bellevue	King	Puget Sound	Multipurpose interpretive center provides visitors with Bellevue Parks and regional system information, family programs and recreational opportunities.
Marine Life Center	Bellingham	Whatcom	Puget Sound	operated by the Northwest Discovery Project, aquarium and marine environmental education, owned by the City
MaST - Marine Science and Technology Center	Des Moines	King	Puget Sound	Marine laboratory and education center for Highline Community College, open to the public on Saturdays
Mercer Slough Environmental Education Center	Bellevue	King	Puget Sound	A collaboration between the City of Bellevue and the Pacific Science Center. Family ranger programs and curriculum based school and group programming focusing on freshwater wetland ecosystems and their importance to the region. Visitor's center has interactive, interpretive exhibits about Mercer Slough's 320 acre wetland habitats.
Nisqually National Wildlife Refuge	Olympia	Thurston	Puget Sound	3,914 acres, visitor center exhibits, environmental education programs
Nisqually Reach Nature Center	Olympia	Thurston	Puget Sound	education and research about the environment of the Nisqually Estuary of the Nisqually River
North Cascades Environmental Learning Center		Whatcom	Puget Sound	field campus in North Cascades National Park, operated by the North Cascades Institute on Diablo Lake
Northwest Trek Wildlife Park	Eatonville	Pierce	Puget Sound	723-acre wildlife park with tram and walking tours, nature discovery center, zip line course, 5 miles of nature trails
Orkila Outdoor Environmental Education Center	Orcas Island	San Juan	San Juan Islands	Run by the YMCA of Greater Seattle. Campus covers 283 acres. Outdoor Education classes focusing on marine and terrestrial ecology for regional schools. Includes Marine Salmon Center containing touch tank, small aquarium tanks, and 18,000 gallon saltwater display tank.
Padilla Bay National Estuarine Research Reserve	Mount Vernon	Skagit	Puget Sound	Features the Breazeale Interpretive Center with natural history exhibits
Port Townsend Marine Science Center	Port Townsend	Jefferson	Olympic Peninsula	located in Fort Worden State Park, marine ecology, local marine and shoreline habitat, history, flora and fauna
SEA Discovery Center	Poulsbo	Kitsap	Puget Sound	aquarium and environmental education center
Seward Park	Seattle	King	Puget Sound	300 acres, operated by the City, features the Seward Park Environmental & Audubon Center
Skagit River Bald Eagle Interpretive Center	Rockport	Skagit	Puget Sound	located in 103-acre Howard Miller Steelhead Park, focus is the Skagit River ecosystem with an emphasis on the winter migration of bald eagles and salmon
Stillwaters Environmental Center	Kingston	Kitsap	Puget Sound	8 acres
Tacoma Nature Center	Tacoma	Pierce	Puget Sound	71 acres, operated by Metro Parks Tacoma
Water Resources Education Center	Vancouver	Clark	Southwest	operated by the City, management of drinking water
West Valley Outdoor Learning Center	Spokane	Spokane	Eastern	teaching and learning facility for students and their teachers about fish, wildlife and natural resources, monthly open house days
Northwest Stream Center	Everett	Snohomish	Puget Sound	operated by the Adopt A Stream Foundation, founded in 1985 with the goal of teaching people to be stewards of their watersheds; 25 acres with an outdoor trout stream exhibit and an ADA-accessible elevated boardwalk over a wetland

== See also ==
- List of nature centers in the United States

== Resources ==
- Environmental Education Association of Washington
