= Olympia Arts & Heritage Alliance Museum =

History museum in downtown Olympia, Washington, USA

- Established: June 28, 2025
- Location: 203 Columbia Street NW; Olympia, Washington
- Coordinates: 47°2′45″N 122°54′12″W
- Type: History museum
- President: Cheryl Selby
- Owner: Olympia Arts & Heritage Alliance
- Website: www.olyaha.org

Olympia Arts & Heritage Alliance Museum is a history museum in downtown Olympia, Washington. It is located at 203 Columbia St. NW and opened to the public on June 28, 2025. The museum is operated by a non-profit of the same name, established in 2018 presided by former city mayor Cheryl Selby.

The museum is 1,200 square feet (110 m^{2}) and changes exhibits every three months; it is open every Thursday through Sunday between 10 a.m. and 5 p.m.

== See also ==
- History of Olympia, Washington
