= Fenlake Meadows =

Nature reserve in Bedford, England

Coordinates: 52.127678°N 0.443458°W

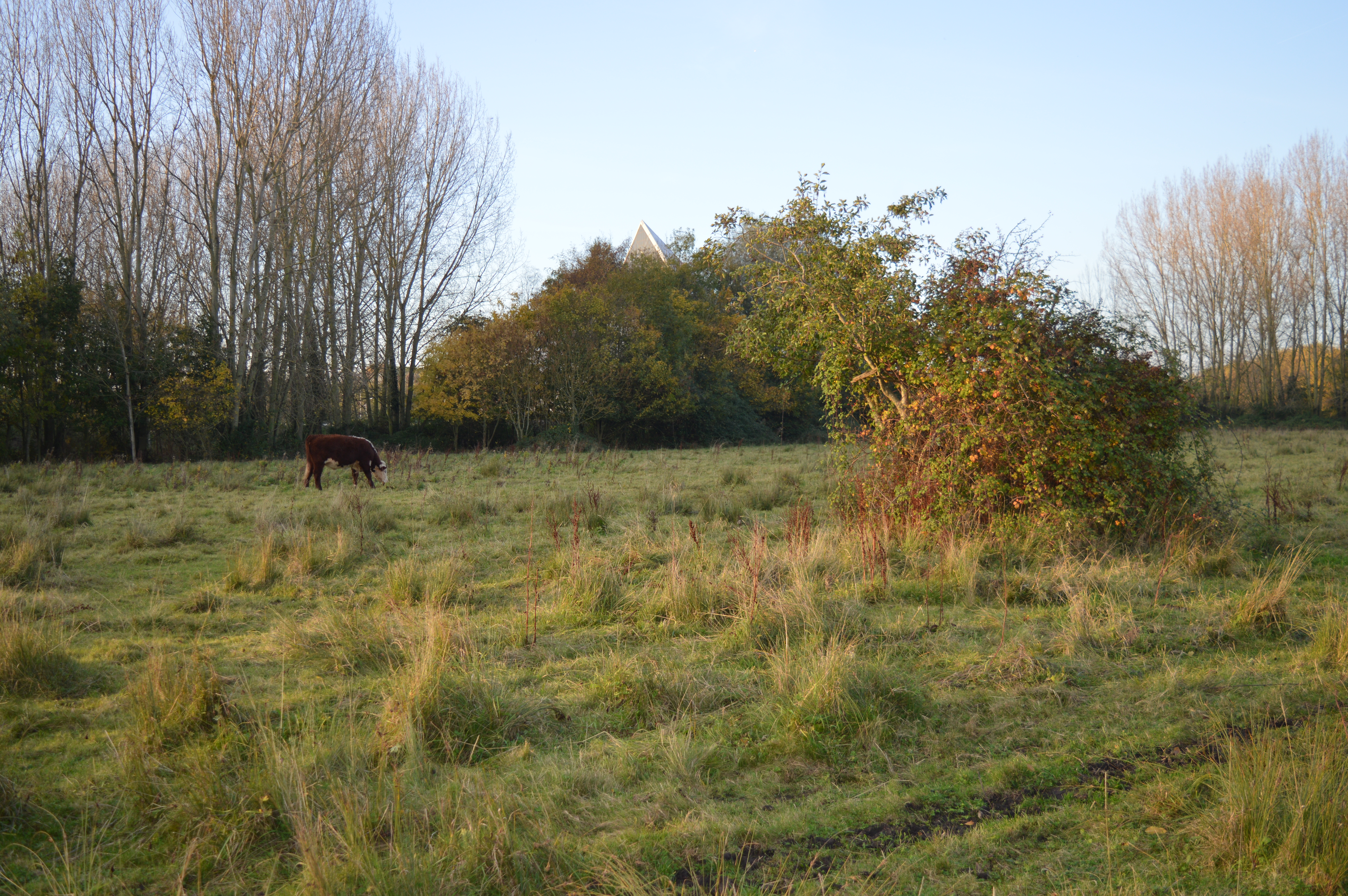

Fenlake Meadows is a 19.2 hectare Local Nature Reserve located in the Kingsbrook area of Bedford. It is owned and managed by Bedford Borough Council.

This site is in a river valley on the bank of the River Great Ouse, and it is often wet and waterlogged. The meadows are grazed by cattle, and there are wetland plants of ecological interest. The site is in decline, as it is being invaded by trees and shrubs and becoming wetter. However, the Marston Vale Trust is working with Bedford Council and the Environment Agency to restore it.

There is no access to most of the site, but there is access to footpaths through the site from Cardington Road.
