= Elwood Evans =

American attorney (1828–1898)

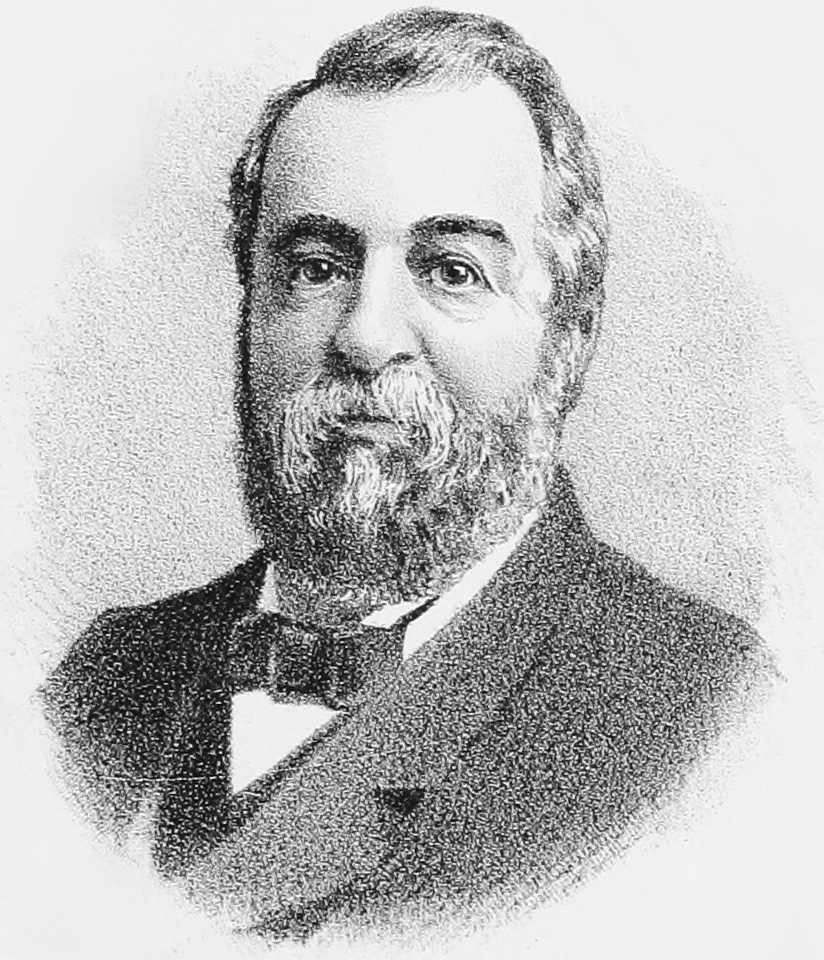

Elwood Evans (December 29, 1828 – January 28, 1898) was an American attorney, politician, and historian from Washington Territory. He was the mayor of Olympia and served briefly as acting governor of the territory. He is known as the pioneer historian of the U.S. state of Washington.

== See also ==
- List of mayors of Olympia, Washington
