= List of mayors of Olympia, Washington =

The following is a list of mayors of the city of Olympia, Washington, United States.

== Town board presidents ==
- Elwood Evans, 1859-1861
- George A. Barnes, 1862, 1866-1869
- Joseph Cushman, 1863
- Edward Giddings, 1864
- Benjamin F. Yantis, 1865
- Francis Henry, 1870-1871
- William Winlock Miller, 1872-1873

== Mayors ==
1. Isaac C. Ellis, 1874
2. Thornton F. McElroy, 1875
3. James C. Horr, 1876, 1891
4. Jno. P. Hudson, 1877
5. Esdras N. Ouimette, 1878-1879
6. George A. Barnes, 1880
7. Edward T. Young, 1881
8. Nathaniel Ostrander, 1882-1883
9. John S. Dobbins, 1884
10. Albert A. Phillips, 1885
11. Andsworth H. Chambers, 1886-1888
12. John F. Gowey, 1889-1890
13. Rossell Galbraith O'Brien, 1892
14. J.W. Robinson, 1893
15. Champion Bromwell Mann, 1894-1895
16. Charles Henry Ayer, 1896
17. John Byrne, 1897
18. George B. Lane, 1898
19. Caleb Springer Reinhart, 1899-1901
20. Clarence J. Lord, 1902-1903
21. Harvey G. Richardson, 1904
22. Philip H. Carlyon, 1905-1906
23. Thos. McLarty, 1907
24. W.A. Hagemeyer, 1908
25. Mitchell Mitchel Harris, 1909-1911
26. Wayne L. Bridgford, 1912
27. George A. Mottman, 1913-1916
28. Jesse T. Mills, 1917-1920
29. C.H. Bowen, 1921-1922
30. Geo. W. Draham, 1923-1924
31. James C. Johnson, 1925-1928
32. George N. Mills, 1929-1931
33. Earl N. Steele, 1932-1934
34. Francis B. Longaker, 1935-1940
35. J.T. Trullinger, 1941-1946
36. Ernest Mallory, 1947-1949
37. Ralph A. Swanson, 1950-1953
38. Amanda Benek Smith, 1954-1960
39. Neil R, McKay, 1961-1969
40. Thomas Allen, 1970-1977
41. Lyle Watson, 1978-1982
42. David Skramstad, 1982-1985, 1992-1993
43. William Daley, 1986-1987
44. Holly Gadbaw, 1988-1989
45. Rex Derr, 1990-1991
46. Bob Jacobs, 1993-1999
47. Stan Biles, 2000-2003
48. Mark Foutch, 2004-2007
49. Doug Mah, 2008-2011
50. Stephen Buxbaum, 2012-2015
51. Cheryl Selby, c. 2016 – c. 2019
52. Dontae Payne, 2023-present

== See also ==
- Olympia history
- City government in Washington (state)
