= Skagit-Squatch Museum =

Coordinates: 48.4776°N 122.3286°W

The Skagit-Squatch Museum is a museum dedicated to Sasquatch and other cryptids in Burlington, Washington. It was started c. 2010 by Mike Vail as something to fill his time during retirement and is operated out of Vail's garage. The collection includes Sasquatch related paraphernalia that Vail has collected overtime as well as wood carvings and other artworks featuring Sasquatch made my Vail personally, and a journal where Vail has recorded his own reported encounters with Sasquatch as well as those reported by members of his family. Cascadia Daily reported that it has over 700 items in its collection as of 2023.

== See also ==
- Bigfoot Museum (Willow Creek, California)
- Bigfoot Discovery Museum
- Expedition Bigfoot: The Sasquatch Museum
