= Molson, Washington =

Community in Okanogan County, Washington, United States

Molson
- Ghost town
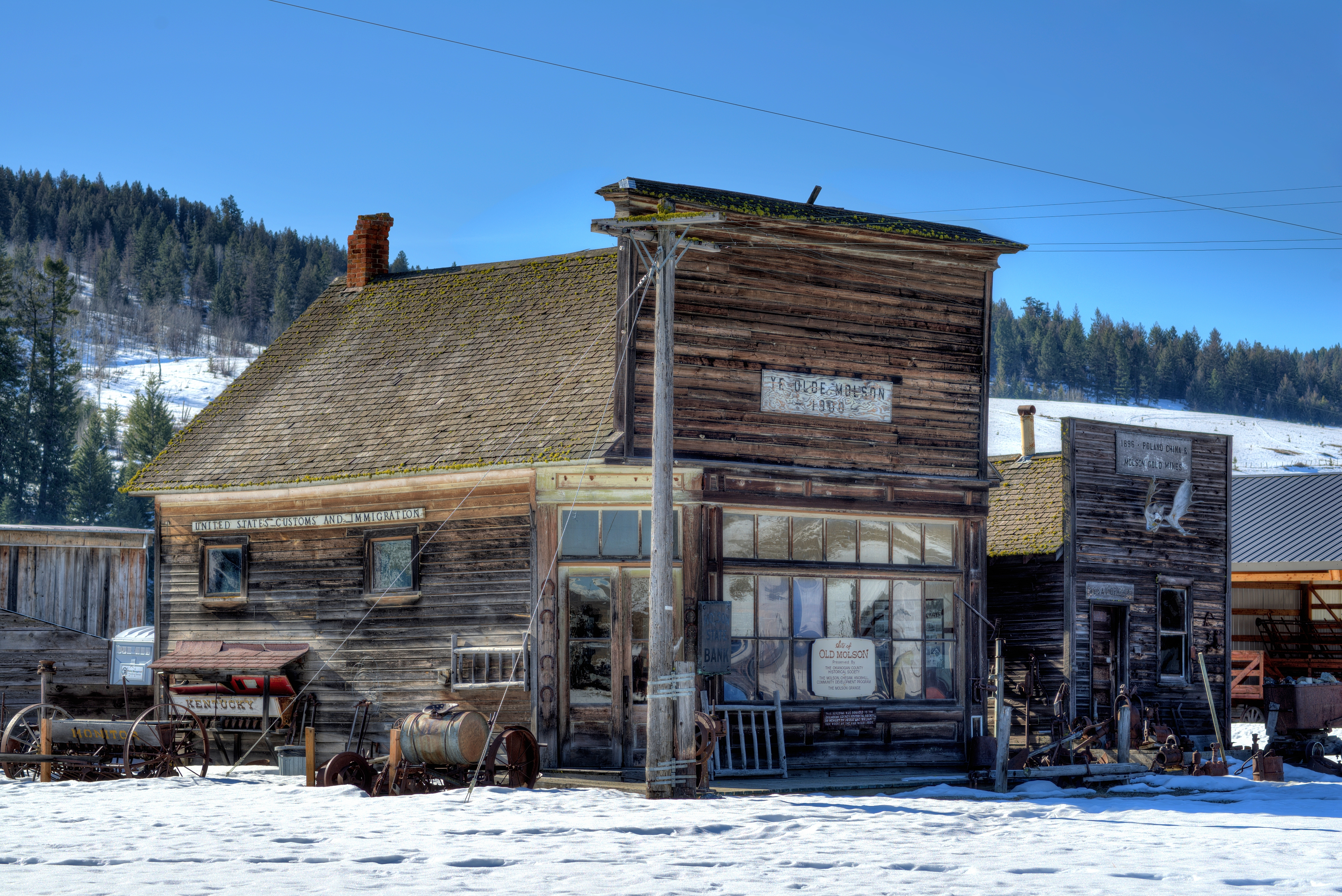

- Location within Washington (state) Location within the United States
- Coordinates: 48°58′52″N 119°12′02″W
- Country: United States
- State: Washington
- County: Okanogan
- Founded: 1900

Population (2000)
  - Total: 23

Molson is in Okanogan County, Washington, United States. By road, the community is 15.1 miles east of Oroville. The ghost town of Old Molson is 1.7 miles south of the Canada–United States border.

== Name origin ==
Molson was founded in 1900 by promoter George B. Meacham, and investor John W. Molson, a member of the Molson family, and officer of the Molson Bank.

== Mining boom & bust ==
The Molson post office was established July 14, 1900, with Walter F. Schuyler as first postmaster. That year, the population peaked at about 300. Erected were three general stores, a drugstore, three saloons, dance hall, livery, blacksmith, assay office, and hotel. A newspaper, attorney, and doctor, served the community. Having invested $170,000, the Molson company withdrew backing. In June 1901, only 12 residents remained. The Hotel Tonasket, named after Chief Tonasket of the Okanogan people, comprised three stories and 34 rooms, burned to the ground in 1924. Limited mining continued intermittently in the area until 1938.

== Railroad expansion ==
In anticipation of the railroad arrival, the town revived. In October 1905, the westward advance of the Great Northern Railway (GN) reached Bridesville, BC, and crossed the border to Molson, with passenger service commencing the next month. The train station was the highest in the state. To the west, Molson Hill was one of the steepest sections of track, on the descent to Oroville, from where passenger service commenced in February 1907. Molson station was 5.0 miles southwest of Bridesville, and 7.1 miles east of Nine Mile.

== New Molson ==
Contention with townsite owner J.H. McDonald prompted residents and commerce to relocate a half mile north across the railroad track to establish New Molson in 1909. Replacing the Molson Hotel, which burned down in 1910, the 23-room New Imperial Hotel was erected in 1911. Renamed the New Wallace Hotel in 1916, the building burned down in 1923. The town mushroomed, but collapsed during the Great Depression. Railroad track abandoned was Molson–Oroville in 1931, and Curlew–Molson in 1935. The location settled into becoming a quiet agricultural community. The post office was discontinued in August 1967, with mail services directed to Oroville.

== Central Molson & Old Molson ==
In the 1950s, the school (in Central Molson) had 110–120 pupils. The historic building now houses the Molson Schoolhouse Museum. Displays include hand tools, household artifacts and photographs. In 1960, two blocks south, Harry Sherling established the Old Ghost Town Museum at the original townsite. The mainly open-air setting comprises pioneer buildings, farm machinery, mining equipment and other historic artifacts. Admission to both locations is by donation.

== See also ==
Vancouver, Victoria and Eastern Railway
