= David Evangelista =

American fashion journalist

- Occupations: Stylist, Host
- Years active: 1996–present
- Relatives: Roberto Lombardi (cousin)

David Evangelista is a fashion/beauty contributor to The Early Show, as well as a guest judge on Iron Chef America. He was nominated for five Emmy Awards for the hairstyling he did on The Rosie O'Donnell Show.

== Career ==
He is well known for his contributions to The Early Show, including his makeover segments, his take on red-carpet fashion, as well as just regular tips on fashion and beauty. Since 2002, he has been a regular contributor, appearing on the show at least once a month.

He also served as a judge on the CBS reality competition show Wickedly Perfect in 2005 and as host on The Fashion Team from 2006 to 2007.

In 2006, he was invited to serve as an Iron Chef America guest judge at the request of both Alton Brown and Rachael Ray. Evangelista has guest judged six times on Iron Chef: America.

In addition to his celebrity status, David owned and operated his own salon as a component of Cornelia Fifth Avenue Spa on 51st Street and 5th Avenue in New York, NY. He also has his own brand of hair and beauty products which are sold online as well as on QVC and the Home Shopping Network.

== Personal life ==
Evangelista is a close friend of both Phoebe Cates and Ricki Lake and was a friend of Joan Rivers. He has been seen with the likes of Steven Cojocaru, critiquing celebrities as they walk the red carpet. He is also a friend of Rachael Ray and Alton Brown of Food Network fame. He is openly gay.

He is the cousin of actors Roberto Lombardi and Gina Lombardi and stylist Kevin Gatto, as well as the nephew of actress Dolores M. Lombardi. He is also cousin to the carpenter Scott McGregor.

== Emmy Awards ==
Year	Nominated work	Category	Result
1997	The Rosie O'Donnell Show	Outstanding Hairstyling	Nominated
1998	The Rosie O'Donnell Show	Outstanding Achievement in Hairstyling	Nominated
1999	The Rosie O'Donnell Show	Outstanding Hairstyling	Nominated
2001	The Rosie O'Donnell Show	Outstanding Achievement in Hairstyling	Nominated
2002	The Rosie O'Donnell Show	Outstanding Achievement in Hairstyling	Nominated
