= Bellingham Railway Museum =

Coordinates: 48°45′03″N 122°28′45″W

The Bellingham Railway Museum was a nonprofit museum located in downtown Bellingham, Washington, USA, that displayed a pictorial and text history of railroad traffic in Whatcom and Skagit Counties, as well as a large electric model railroad, an exhibit of railroad lanterns, and a train simulator based on Microsoft Train Simulator software. A research library was also hosted. It opened in 2003 and was volunteer-operated until its permanent closure in June 2020 during the COVID-19 pandemic. The items of the museum were subsequently transferred to the Northwest Railway Museum located in Snoqualmie.
