= Steilacoom Community Church =

Coordinates: 47°10′19″N 122°35′55″W

- Steilacoom Community Church
- Steilacoom Community Church
- Location: 1603 Rainier Street, Steilacoom, Washington 98388
- Country: United States
- Denomination: Protestant
- Website: http://www.steilacoom.church/

History
- Founded: 1883
- Founder: Arthur Burnell

Clergy
- Pastor: Jeffrey Owen

Steilacoom Community Church is a Protestant church in Steilacoom, Washington.

== History ==
The original church was established in 1883 as Oberlin Congregational Church with eight charter members, including its first minister, Arthur Burnell. The vacant Presbyterian Mission was purchased with the help of the American Home Mission board to house the new church. The name "Oberlin" was chosen in honour of Oberlin College, where Burnell and his wife had attended.

In 1902 the members of the church voted to build a new church building. Their new two-story wood-frame building, with a steeple, incorporated lumber from the old church, which had been dismantled. Timbers from the 1854 Methodist Episcopal Church building may also have been used. Members of the First Congregational Church in Tacoma are reported to have travelled by electric streetcar from Tacoma to participate in its dedication. The 1902 church building houses the Steilacoom Cultural Center and Tribal Museum.

The church had about 28 ministers over its first 125 years, from 1883 to 2008. For many years one minister served the church as well as congregations in the nearby communities of Lakeview and Lake City. In 1915 the church asked the Home Missionary Society for a loan of $144 to buy Reverend Charles Gaffney a motorcycle for traveling between Steilacoom and the other churches he served. The first full-time minister was Herbert West, who served from 1926 to 1951.

For many years, the church Ladies Aid Society kept the church open by conducting fund-raising events to pay its operating expenses. As the community and the church continued to grow during the 1950s, the decision was made in 1960 to build a new church. The first phase was completed in 1961, the second in 1978 with the additions of a Fellowship Hall, Sunday school rooms, offices and kitchen.

In April 1983, the church celebrated its centennial. In 2002, the church participated in the Washington State sesquicentennial celebration as Steilacoom's oldest "pioneer" corporation. The 125th-anniversary celebration of the founding of the church was observed in April 2008, with a prayer service and potluck dinner.

The congregation changed its name to Steilacoom Community Church on December 13, 2015.
