= Eastside Heritage Center =

U.S. nonprofit organization

Eastside Heritage Center is a 501(c)(3) organization created for historical preservation and education on the Eastside of King County in Washington state. It is based in Bellevue, Washington. The organization was founded in 2001 through a merger of the Bellevue Historical Society and the Marymoor Museum (formerly in the Clise Mansion at Marymoor Park in Redmond).

Offices are in downtown Bellevue and the historic Frederick W. Winters House, also in Bellevue, which houses a small exhibit space. Larger exhibits are held at various locations in the area, such as Crossroads Mall. A "mini museum" opened at the Key Center tower in downtown Bellevue in 2007, and is no longer open.

The Eastside Heritage Center presents the annual Bellevue Strawberry Festival, with support from the city of Bellevue.

== Bibliography ==
- Eastside Heritage Center (2006). Lake Washington The Eastside (Images of America). Arcadia Publishing. ISBN 0-7385-3106-5.
