= KidsQuest Children's Museum =

Coordinates: 47°37′14″N 122°11′45″W

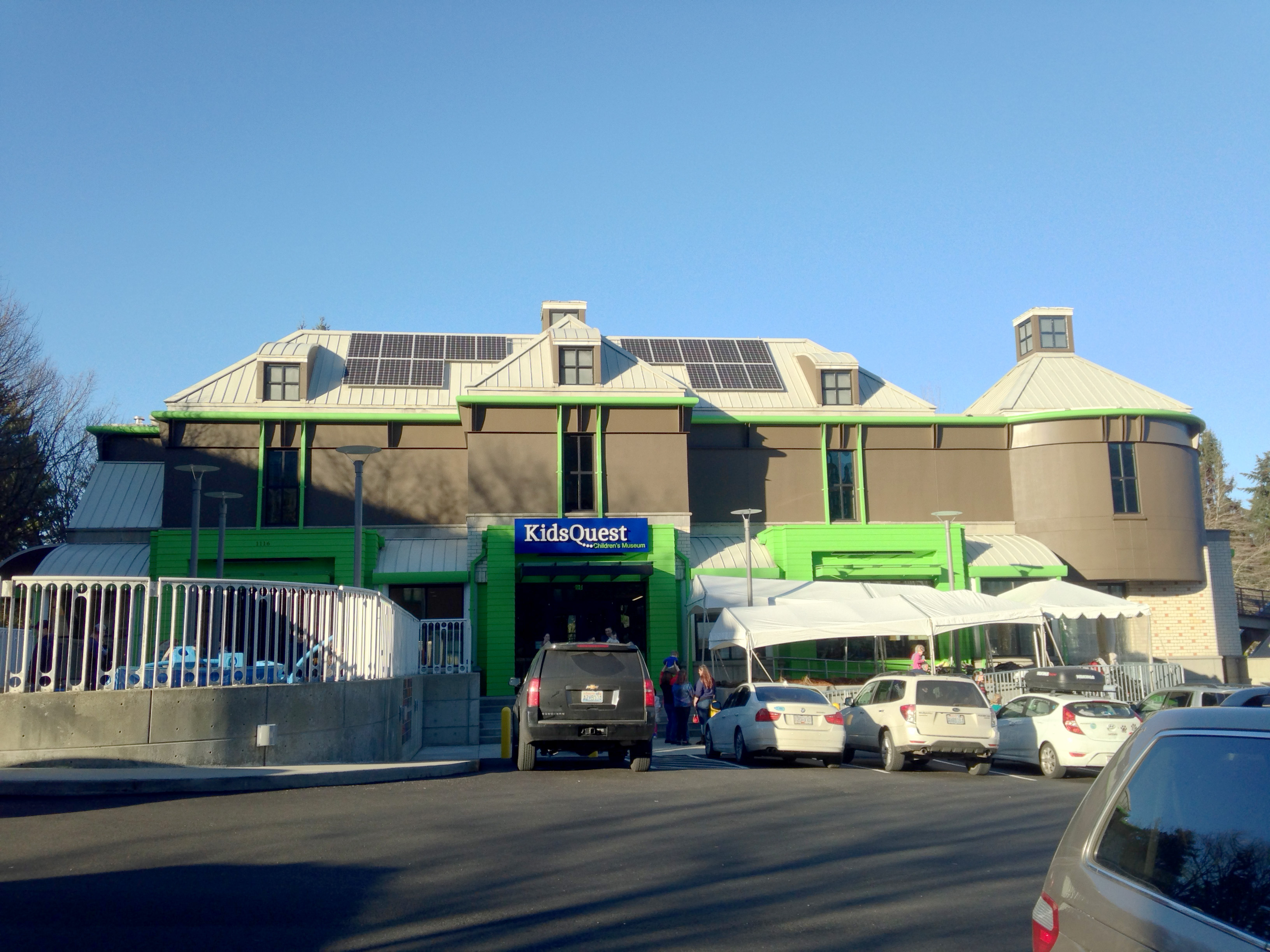
- Front of building
- Established: 2005
- Website: kidsquestmuseum.org

KidsQuest Children's Museum is a hands-on, interactive children's museum that encourages learning through play with an emphasis on science, technology, engineering, art and math (STEAM). Exhibits and programs are geared towards children 0-10 and their families. KidsQuest offers over 650 programs throughout the year including early learning classes, summer camps, drop-off and whole-family science workshops, free art programs and many special events including concerts and holiday programs.

KidsQuest is a non-profit organization located in Bellevue, Washington. Exhibits and classes are intended to encourage cognitive, physical and emotional development through play.

== History ==
KidsQuest Children's Museum was conceived in 1997 in response to a survey in Eastside Parents magazine identifying a children's museum as the "most needed facility or service" for the communities east of Lake Washington.

The museum opened on December 11, 2005, in the Marketplace at Factoria in Bellevue and was designed to accommodate 60,000 visitors per year. As of 2014, the museum averages over 155,000 visitors per year, and has had over a million visitors since opening.

In January 2017, KidsQuest moved to a new location in Downtown Bellevue, at the former site of the Rosalie Whyel Museum of Doll Art. KidsQuest announced in October 2025 that it plans to acquire the Bellevue Arts Museum building in downtown for $5 million; the building would be renovated and reopen in 2029.
