= IslandWood =

Coordinates: 47°36′19″N 122°31′58″W

IslandWood is a non-profit environmental education organization and event venue on Bainbridge Island, WA. The organization runs programs for students, schools, graduate students, educators, and community members on Bainbridge Island, and in Seattle, Renton, Woodinville, Tacoma, and online. IslandWood hosts weddings, meetings, retreats, and conferences on their 250-acre Bainbridge Island campus & event revenue helps keep their outdoor learning programs financially possible for under-resourced schools in the region. IslandWood's mission is to provide exceptional learning experiences that inspire lifelong environmental and community stewardship.

== History ==
In 1997, over 1,000 acres (4 km^{2}) of land were being sold on the south end of Bainbridge Island. Local residents Debbi and Paul Brainerd proposed the idea of building a children's outdoor education center; a subsequent feasibility study showed that half of Puget Sound area students did not receive overnight outdoor education programs. The Brainerds purchased 255 acres (1.03 km^{2}) of land for the program, which was founded in 2000. In 2011, IslandWood was selected to lead the education programs at the Brightwater sewage treatment plant.

== Programs ==
- School Overnight Program: 4th- 6th grade students from around the region spend 4 nights on IslandWood's Bainbridge Island campus, bringing classroom learning to life, participating in field investigations, practice collaborative problem solving, and engaging with peers from other classrooms and schools. Students spend an average of 30 hours outdoors exploring during their time at IslandWood!
- Graduate Program in Education for Environment and Community (EEC): Offered in partnership with the University of Washington College of Education, the program is a 10-month immersive residency in justice-oriented environmental education; experiential, student-centered learning; and culturally-responsive teaching and curriculum development. The IslandWood Graduate Program completes the first year of a UW Master’s in Education and fulfills the prerequisites for application to the Master’s in Teaching in Elementary Education.
- Day Programs in Seattle, Woodinville, and Renton: IslandWood offers programs at the Brightwater Center in Woodinville, the South Plant in Renton, on the Duwamish River, and in parks throughout Seattle that are designed to broaden the idea of "environment" to include urban systems and emphasize human impacts on ecosystems.
- Teacher Professional Learning Courses & Workshops: Professional learning courses are offered to teachers at no cost and designed to help teachers make science meaningful, approachable, and connected to students' lives.
- Community Events & Programs: IslandWood offers a number of events for the public, many of which are free or low-cost.
