= Puget Sound Museum of Natural History =

Coordinates: 47.26365359829974°N 122.48279435102425°W

The Puget Sound Museum of Natural History is closely associated with the Department of Biology at the University of Puget Sound in Tacoma, Washington, United States. Founded in 1946, it was one of the primary natural history museums in the state of Washington in its early years and has continued to the present to remain active in building up its collections.

Goals and Objectives

The museum's primary goal is to provide a well-curated collection of specimens to be used for research and education by the communities to which it belongs: the University of Puget Sound, the Puget Sound region, and, in a broad sense, the world.

An additional goal of the museum is to advocate for the value of natural history museums.

History

First called the Puget Sound Museum of Natural History at its founding in 1946, the University of Puget Sound trustees changed the name of the museum to the Slater Museum in 1979 to honor its founder, James R. Slater. In 2023 returned to its original name.

The museum has a long history at the University of Puget Sound. Biology faculty member James Slater began his research on Pacific Northwest reptiles and amphibians in 1926 and began to accumulate a collection of those animals. In 1930, Gordon Alcorn joined the faculty and began to contribute bird specimens to the fledgling museum. Soon thereafter, other local ornithologists contributed bird collections to the museum. In 1946, standardized wooden museum cases were constructed to hold the developing collections. At the same time, a newly refurbished room in Thompson Hall was given to the museum as its own space.

Murray Johnson, a Tacoma surgeon, had begun to study Pacific Northwest mammals and in 1948 became active in the museum; his mammal collections contributed to the museum’s holdings in terrestrial vertebrates. By then, a herbarium collection, also started by Slater, had been added to the mix, and the museum took on an increasingly important role in the curriculum of the Biology Department. In 1955, the very extensive bird and mammal collections of Stanley Jewett were donated to the museum. The museum's stature as an important collection of Pacific Northwest vertebrates continued to increase during these years.

In 1968, the museum was moved to new quarters in Thompson Hall, with offices and expanded spaces for specimen preparation and storage. By that time, it was one of the pre-eminent natural history museums in the Pacific Northwest, under the directorships of Gordon Alcorn and then Terrence Mace. In the 1990s, under the directorship of Dennis Paulson, specimen acquisition was again very active, and the museum received orphaned bird collections from Walla Walla College and Western Washington University. Active collecting of vertebrates has diminished in recent years, but salvaged specimens are still being received and prepared.

A representative insect collection was started during the 1930s, when entomology was taught at the university, and the collection grew substantially in 1993 with the donation of an important collection by Gordon Orians of the University of Washington. More recently, Mark Genich, retired from a medical career, renewed interest in the insect collection by actively collecting from 2011 to 2018.

Subsequently, two major insect collections were received from Eric Vollrath and Richard Brown, both of them with specimens purchased from dealers over a period of years and featuring a wide variety of spectacular and showy insects of many orders but especially beetles, butterflies, and moths. Finally, a large collection of butterflies was donated in 2022 by their collector, Robert Kirk.

In 2004, the museum was moved to new quarters in a central location in Thompson Hall, and the incoming director, Peter Wimberger, obtained a National Science Foundation collections improvement grant to replace wooden with metal cases. Furthermore, Dr. Wimberger moved the museum in a new outreach direction to enhance the engagement of the local community with the museum, and that has been continued by the present director, Kena Fox-Dobbs.

With the directorship of Dr. Fox-Dobbs, the museum's collections were further expanded by adding under its umbrella the Geology Department's extensive collections of fossils, rocks and minerals.

Collections

The museum has continued to grow since its early days. Its collections now contain over 115,000 specimens of animals, plants, and geological specimens, with emphasis on the Pacific Northwest.

As of December 2024, the museum's research collections totaled 31,363 mammals, 28,165 birds, 3,293 reptiles, 4,792 amphibians, 16,010 insects, 1,345 mollusks, 13,843 plants, 10,795 paleontology specimens, and about 4,000 rocks and minerals.

The collections provide specimens for a wide variety of research projects and are used in numerous University of Puget Sound classes. PSM specimens are used as sources of DNA and measurements of stable isotopes in the inert tissues of feathers and hair.

The museum was one of the first institutions to save a separate extended wing of every bird specimen prepared and now has one of the largest wing collections, with 7,500 specimens, images of many of which are available on the museum's website.

The museum's egg collection contains 4,500 egg sets, including almost all North American bird species. In addition, about 1,000 bird nests have been preserved. Datasets from this collection have been used to illustrate breeding phenology in Pacific Northwest birds.

Substantial teaching collections of about 1,000 bird and mammal specimens have been built up to be used to enhance outreach programs as well as classroom teaching.

Georeferencing and Databasing

Georeferencing and databasing of all of the bird specimens by collection manager Gary Shugart in the early 1990s improved the museum's value to biology and was among the early efforts at this activity. At present, all of the vertebrate and plant collections are represented in the online databases of the Global Biodiversity Information Facility, Integrated Digitized Biocollections, Symbiota, and the Consortium of Pacific Northwest Herbaria.

Natural History Exhibits

With a grant from the Institute of Museum and Library Services, the design firm Chase & Co. was contracted to install a series of exhibits focusing on the biodiversity of the Puget Sound region, and the exhibits were installed in 2014.

The exhibits, some of which include touch screens for further learning, deal with subjects such as biodiversity, the value of museums, familiar flora and fauna, salmon biodiversity and ecology, urban wildlife, and forest ecology. Several display cases have been used to show short-term educational exhibits on a revolving basis.

Education

The museum’s education programs have grown greatly in recent years with the initiation of the position of Director of Outreach as well as a Docents Program. Furthermore, the museum has had AmeriCorps workers in some years to handle aspects of outreach.

Museum collections are open to the public by appointment, and in addition the museum is generally open during a two-hour period two days each week during school terms, when docents are present to give tours and answer questions.

Docent Program

The museum started a Docent Program in 2009, and University of Puget Sound students who have taken the program give guided tours to school groups and the public, help at museum functions, and prepare and work with specimens.

Nature in the Classroom

The museum’s Nature in the Classroom program has developed educational kits that are circulated to fourth- and fifth-grade classes in the Tacoma area.

Puget Sound Museum of Natural History Official Site

https://www.pugetsound.edu/puget-sound-museum-natural-history
