= Cheryl Selby =

American politician

Mayor of Olympia
- In office December 31, 2015 – December 29, 2023
- Preceded by: Stephen Buxbaum
- Succeeded by: Dontae Payne

Personal details
- Born: December 4, 1960 (age 65) Seattle, Washington, U.S.
- Party: Democratic
- Education: Seattle Pacific University (BS)

Cheryl Lynne Selby (born December 4, 1960) is an American politician. She served as the mayor of Olympia, Washington from 2015 until 2023.

== Early life and career ==
Selby was born and raised in Seattle. She spent weekends and summer days at her grandparents' cabin at Lake Cushman growing up. Selby studied textiles at Seattle Pacific University and worked at Brittania Jeans during the 1980s. She moved to Olympia in 1994 to take advantage of the school district. Selby worked in the parks and recreation department for two years. Selby served as a volunteer in the Olympia School District as an Art Partner, Parent-Teacher Association President, Campaign volunteer, and worked on the successful 2003 Bond Campaign. In 2003, she worked in the Probation Services Department in charge of the Safe and Sober Driving Program. Selby owned a small clothing business in Olympia called Vivala, which opened in 2006. She moved it to a location near the Farmer's Market in 2009 and remarried and purchased a new home the same year.

== Political career ==
Selby was elected to the Olympia City Council at position 4. In November 2015, Selby was elected mayor of Olympia, succeeding Stephen Buxbaum who did not run for re-election. She received 70.8 percent of the vote over Marco Rosaire Rossi. Selby, who ran on a platform of redirecting state revenue back to the city, became the third female mayor in the city's history. In May 2018, she was the subject of a protest outside her home, which she blamed on an anarchist group. During her first term in office, homelessness became a major issue in Olympia. Selby authorized construction of a "tiny house village" with room for about 40 people and a sanctioned camp to house 120 people in tents. In November 2019, Selby was re-elected as mayor, receiving 8,614 votes to 7,612 from Nathaniel Jones.

Selby was the focus of national media attention in June 2020, after a group affiliated with Black Lives Matter spray-painted her front porch and door. At some point, a man holding a paddle told the group to leave and threatened them if they would not comply. Selby, who was not home at the time, originally compared the incident to domestic terrorism but later said "I know that what happened to me was not domestic terrorism.” She apologised and said “Once I stepped back and calmed down, I realized that those words were an overreaction to what I'd seen in the video.” While she said she agreed with many of the protesters' demands for police reform, Selby stated the Olympia Police Department had a good reputation and called for patience.

== See also ==
- List of mayors of Olympia, Washington

Political offices
| Preceded by Stephen Buxbaum | Mayor of Olympia; 2015–2023 | Succeeded by Dontae Payne |
