= Rosalie Whyel Museum of Doll Art =

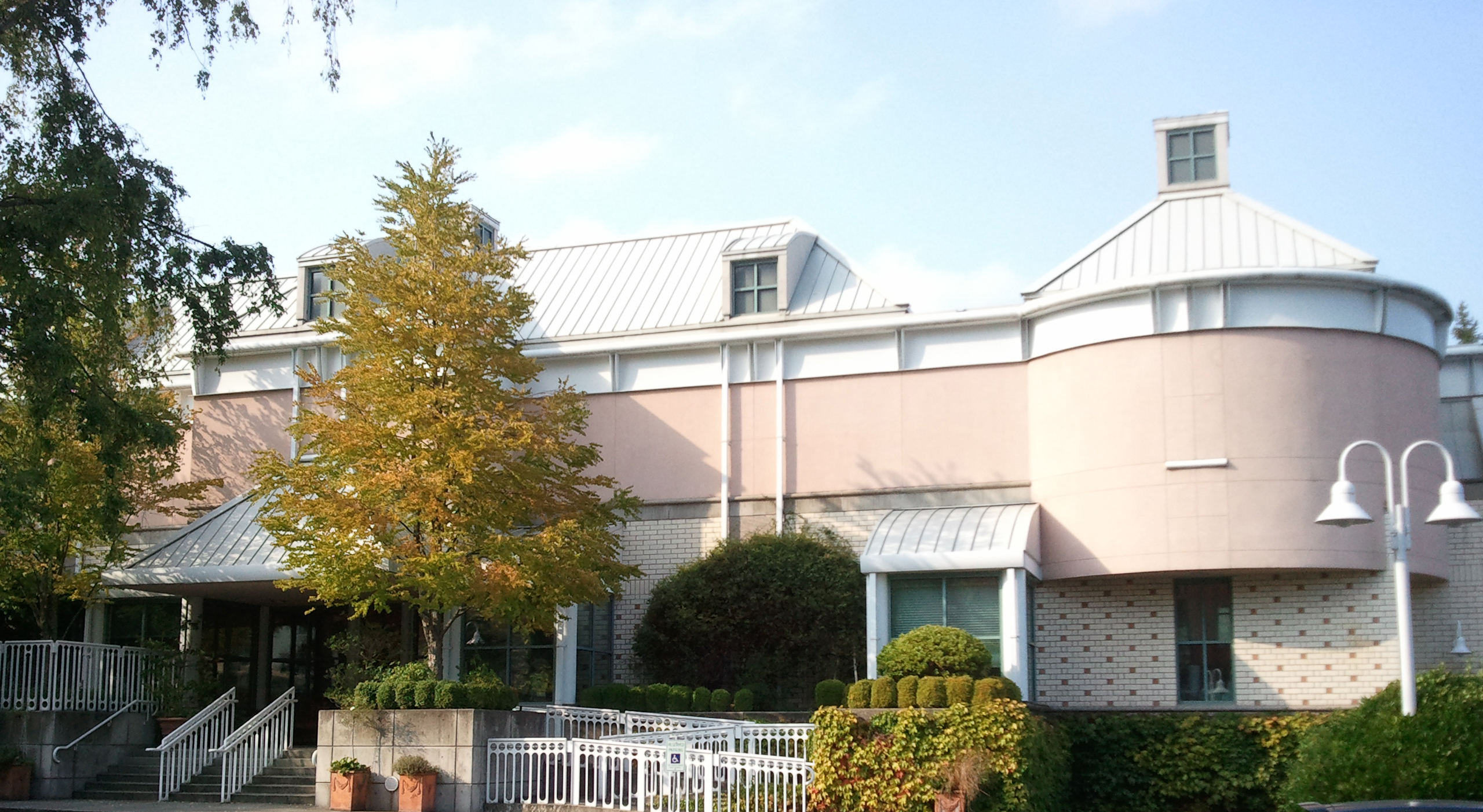
- Established: 1992
- Dissolved: 2012
- Location: Bellevue, Washington, USA
- Coordinates: 47.621°N 122.196°W
- Collection size: Doll art
- Visitors: 10,000 (2010 estimate)
- Website: dollart.com

The Rosalie Whyel Museum of Doll Art was an art museum in Bellevue, Washington, USA. It featured a permanent collection of over 1,200 dolls. The museum was founded in 1992 and won a number of awards for its collection, including the Jumeau Trophy for best private doll museum in the world.

In August 2011, the museum's owner and namesake announced that the museum would close on March 1, 2012. Five years later, the building became the new location of KidsQuest Children's Museum.
