= Pomeroy Living History Farm =

- Pomeroy Farm
- U.S. National Register of Historic Places
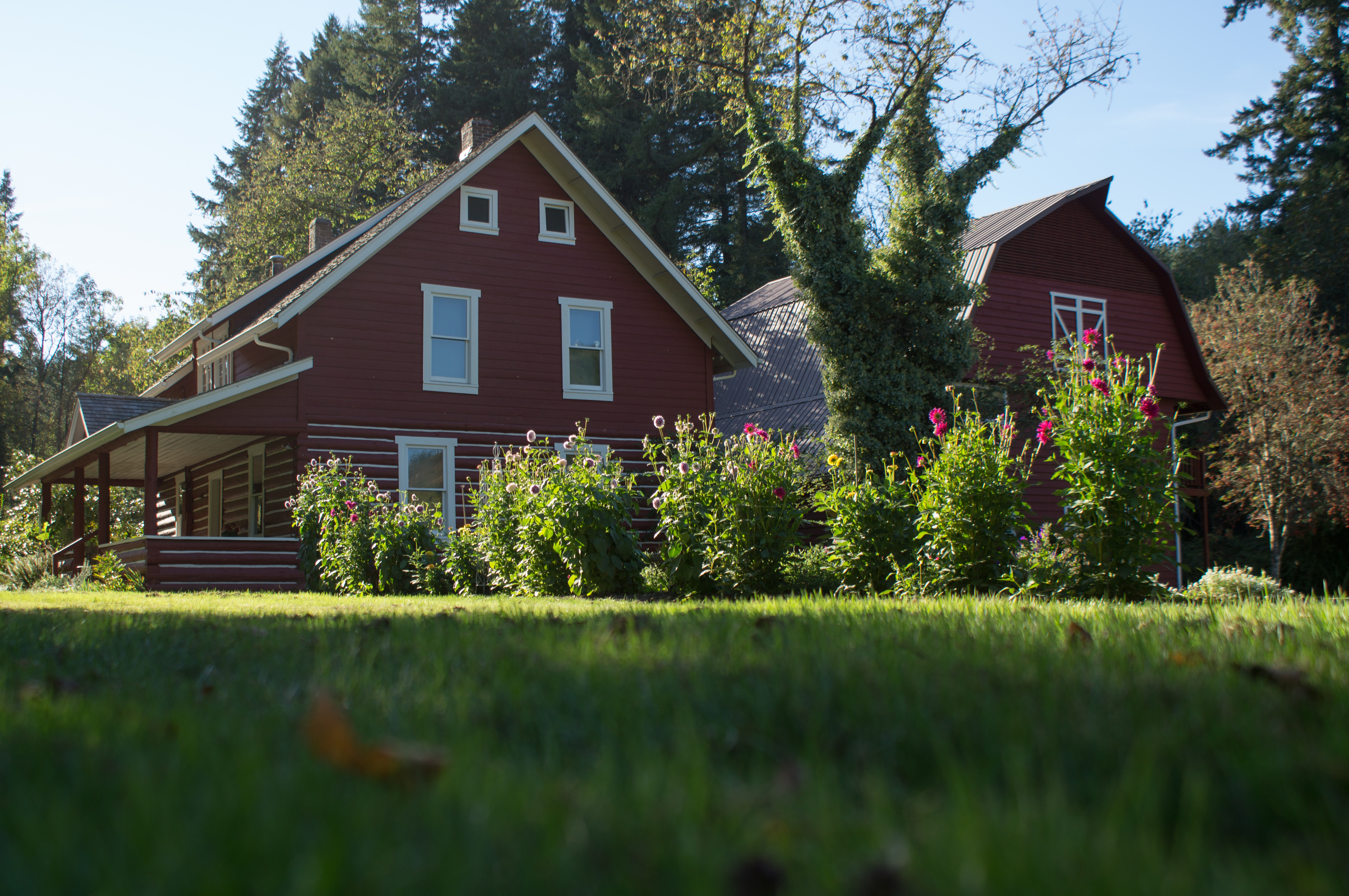

- Location within Washington (state)
- Nearest city: Yacolt, Washington
- Coordinates: 45.84033°N 122.45897°W
- Area: 677 acres (274 ha)
- Built: 1910
- Built by: Pomeroy, Erwin Charles; Pomeroy, Thomas
- NRHP reference No.: 87000413
- Added to NRHP: March 13, 1987

The Pomeroy Living History Farm is a 501(c)(3) non-profit farm museum on the National Register of Historic Places. Located in Yacolt, Washington, the site is an interactive recreation of a 1920s working farm, based on the original Pomeroy family's 1910 home and outlying structures and occupying 60 of the property's full 677 acres (2.74 km^{2}).
