= National Hairdressers' Federation =

UK trade association

- Abbreviation: NHF
- Formation: 1942
- Legal status: Non-profit company
- Purpose: UK hairdressing salons
- Location: One Abbey Court, Fraser Road, Priory Business Park, Bedford, MK44 3WH
- Region served: United Kingdom
- Members: 7,000 hairdressing salon owners
- Website: www.nhf.info

The National Hairdressers' Federation is a trade industry group representing hairdressing salon owners in the United Kingdom.

== Structure ==
It has 12 regions, with up to six branches within each region:

- London & Home Counties
- Eastern Counties
- North East
- South West
- Southern
- Central England
- East Midlands
- North West
- Yorkshire
- East of Scotland
- West of Scotland
- Wales

== See also ==
- First Choice Haircutters
