= Harbor History Museum =

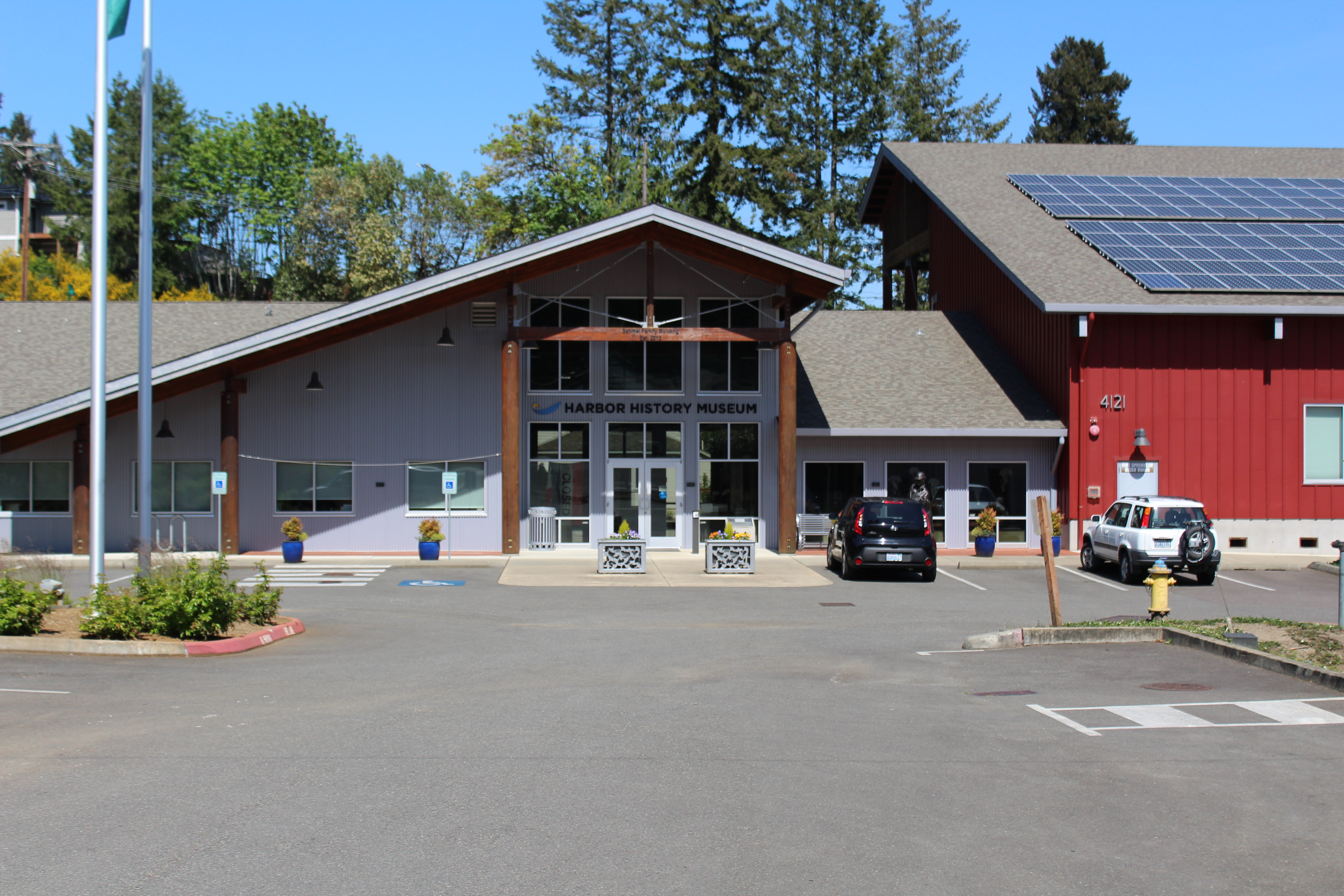
- Established: 2010
- Location: 4121 Harborview Drive; Gig Harbor, Washington
- Coordinates: 47.3375°N 122.5931°W
- Type: History and maritime
- Director: Stephanie Lile
- Owner: Gig Harbor Peninsula Historical Society
- Website: harborhistorymuseum.org

The Harbor History Museum is a regional maritime and history museum in Gig Harbor, Washington. It hosts exhibits on regional culture and history, and Midway Schoolhouse, a one-room schoolhouse built in 1893 and moved to the museum's grounds in 2009. The museum won the Washington Museum Association annual Award of Project Excellence for an ongoing living history program called Midway Pioneer School Experience that leads grade-school students through a day in an early 20th century classroom.

The museum acquired its current 14,500-square-foot (1,350 m^{2}) location on downtown Gig Harbor's Harborview Drive with a $1.5 million gift from a Gig Harbor family. The museum opened there in 2010.

In late 2014, the museum board announced it would host more local cultural events including monthly music concerts in 2015.

== The Shenandoah Restoration Project ==
The museum is restoring a wooden fishing boat, the Shenandoah, that worked the San Juan Islands from 1925 until it was donated to the museum in 2000 by the vessel's owner, Tony Janovich.
