= National Heritage Foundation =

American foundation

The National Heritage Foundation (NHF), based in Falls Church, Virginia (EIN 58–2085326), was established in 1994. It shares an address, web site and many of its executive staff with Congressional District Programs.

The NHF attracted accusations that it helped donors get inappropriate tax breaks. The organization said it complied with the law. In 2006, the Pension Protection Act outlawed a practice of the organization of allowing employees to donate, get a tax reduction for it, then draw a salary from the same pool of money. It was also one of the largest operations using a practice called charitable-split dollar, which was prohibited in a new law in 1999. Members would make tax-deductible donations, that the organization would use to pay for life insurance policies. Most of these were taken out for the benefit of the donors' heirs, and only a small portion went to charity.

In January 2009, the NHF filed for chapter 11 bankruptcy protection, after the court ordered it to pay millions of dollar to donors it said were misled. In October a reorganization plan was approved by the Federal Bankruptcy Court for the Eastern District of Virginia.
