= List of museums in New York (state) =

This list of museums in New York is a list of museums, defined for this context as institutions (including nonprofit organizations, government entities, and private businesses) that collect and care for objects of cultural, artistic, scientific, or historical interest and make their collections or related exhibits available for public viewing. Museums that exist only in cyberspace (i.e., virtual museums) are not included. Also included are non-profit art centers and galleries.

The following museums are in New York, but their lists are maintained separately:

- List of museums in New York City
- List of museums on Long Island for museums in Nassau and Suffolk counties
- List of university art museums and galleries in New York State

Also, a list of museum ships in New York includes some ships that are museums, plus individual ships within larger museums.

== The list ==
Museums in New York State besides those in New York City, Long Island, or universities are the following:

Name	Image	Location	County	Region	Type	Summary
1805 Frisbie House		Salisbury Center	Herkimer	Adirondack Region	Local history	Operated by the Salisbury Historical Society
1812 Homestead Farm and Museum		Willsboro	Essex	Adirondack Region	Agriculture	Recreates daily farm life in the early 19th century
1863 Schoolhouse		Deerpark	Orange	Mid-Hudson	Local history	
1890 House Museum		Cortland	Cortland	Finger Lakes	Historic house	website, focuses on Victorian life
Adirondack History Center Museum		Elizabethtown	Essex	Adirondack Region	Local history	website, operated by the Essex County Historical Society
Adirondack Lakes Center for the Arts		Blue Mountain Lake	Hamilton	Adirondack Region	Art	website
Adirondack Mennonite Heritage Farm		Croghan	Lewis	Adirondack Region	Historic house	Operated by the Adirondack Mennonite Heritage Association & Historical Society, 19th-century house and farm buildings with exhibits about early Amish-Mennonite settlers in the area
Adirondack Experience		Blue Mountain Lake	Hamilton	Adirondack Region	Local history	Outdoor recreation, boats and boating, transportation, fine art, work and industry, tourism, and community life
Adsit Log Cabin		Willsboro	Essex	Adirondack Region	Historic house	18th-century log cabin
Afton Historical Museum		Afton	Chenango	Central Leatherstocking	Local history	website, operated by the Afton Historical Society
Agricultural Memories Museum		Penn Yan	Yates	Finger Lakes	Agriculture	Antique farm tractors, farm equipment, carriages, toy tractors, open by appointment
Akin Free Library		Pawling	Dutchess	Mid-Hudson	Multiple	Library with museum of local history operated by the Pawling Historical Society and the Olive Gunnison Natural History Museum
Akwesasne Cultural Center		Hogansburg	Franklin	Adirondack Region	Native American	
Albany Center Gallery		Albany	Albany	Capital District	Art	Contemporary art
Albany Institute of History & Art		Albany	Albany	Capital District	Multiple	Art, local history, founded in 1791
Albany Pine Bush Discovery Center		Albany	Albany	Capital District	Natural history	Natural history of the Albany Pine Bush Preserve
Alfred Ceramic Art Museum		Alfred	Allegany	Buffalo Niagara Region	Art	Part of Alfred University, historic and contemporary ceramic and glass objects
Alice T. Miner Museum		Chazy	Clinton	Adirondack Region	Historic house	1824 Colonial Revival house with period furnishings
Alling Coverlet Museum		Palmyra	Wayne	Finger Lakes	Textile	website, coverlets date from the 1830s to the 1880s and quilts, operated by Historic Palmyra
American Italian Museum & Cultural Center		Albany	Albany	Capital District	Ethnic	website
American Maple Museum		Croghan	Lewis	Adirondack Region	Food and drink	website
American Museum of Cutlery		Cattaraugus	Cattaraugus	Buffalo Niagara Region	Industry	Examples of knives, swords, edged tools and weapons
Ames Museum		Ames	Montgomery	Mohawk Valley	Local history	
Anderson Falls Heritage Museum		Keeseville	Essex	Adirondack Region	Local history	Operated by the Anderson Falls Heritage Society
Antique Boat Museum		Clayton	Jefferson	Thousand Islands	Maritime	
Arcade Historical Society Museum		Arcade	Wyoming	Buffalo Niagara Region	Local history	website, also known as the Gibby House
Arkell Museum		Canajoharie	Montgomery	Mohawk Valley	Multiple	American art and history
Arnot Art Museum		Elmira	Chemung	Finger Lakes	Art	Includes 17th to 19th-century European paintings, and 19th and 20th-century American art, 21st-century contemporary representational art
Art Museum at SUNY Potsdam		Potsdam	St. Lawrence	Thousand Islands	Art	Also known as Gibson Gallery, part of State University of New York at Potsdam
Arts Center of Yates County		Penn Yan	Yates	Finger Lakes	Art	website, arts center with exhibit gallery
Ashford Historical Society Museum		West Valley	Cattaraugus	Buffalo Niagara Region	Local history	Open by appointment
AWA Wireless Museum		Bloomfield	Ontario	Finger Lakes	Technology	website, vintage radio equipment, operated by the Antique Wireless Association
Avon Preservation and Historical Society Museum		Avon	Livingston	Finger Lakes	Local history	website
Babbie Rural & Farm Learning Museum		Peru	Clinton	Adirondack Region	Agriculture	website, rural farm buildings, equipment and tools
Bainbridge Museum		Bainbridge	Chenango	Central Leatherstocking	Local history	photos, operated by the Bainbridge Historical Society
Bannerman Castle		Pollepel Island	Dutchess	Mid-Hudson	Historic house	Tours of the early 20th-century castle house, part in ruins, accessible by boat
Barker Historical Museum		Fredonia	Chautauqua	Buffalo Niagara Region	Local history	
Bedford Museum		Bedford	Westchester	Lower Hudson	Local history	website, operated by the Bedford Historical Society, includes the restored 1787 Court House and local history exhibits, also operates the 1829 School House
Bement-Billings Farmstead		Newark Valley	Tioga	Finger Lakes	Historic house	Operated by the Newark Valley Historical Society, early 19th-century period house and farmstead, costumed docents with craft demonstrations
Bemus Point Historical Museum		Bemus Point	Chautauqua	Buffalo Niagara Region	Local history	Operated by the Bemus Point Historical Society
Benjamin and Dr. Edgar R. Codeld Judaic Museum		Buffalo	Erie	Buffalo Niagara Region	Judaica	Located in Temple Beth Zion, features over 1,000 Judaic artifacts dating from the 10th century, also known as the Codeld Judaic Museum
Benjamin Long Homestead		Tonawanda	Niagara	Buffalo Niagara Region	Historic house	website, operated by the Historical Society of the Tonawandas, 19th-century house
Benjamin Patterson Inn		Corning	Steuben	Finger Lakes	Open air	Operated by the Corning-Painted Post Historical Society, complex includes Benjamin Patterson Inn, Wixson Road Log Cabin, Blacksmith Shop, Starr Barn, Browntown Schoolhouse
Best House and Medical Exhibit		Middleburgh	Schoharie	Capital District	Historic house	Former country doctor's home with medical exhibits, life from the 1870s to 1940s
Beth Joseph Synagogue		Tupper Lake	Franklin	Adirondack Region	Judaica	
Bevier House Museum		Marbletown	Ulster	Mid-Hudson	Historic house	Home of the Ulster County Historical Society, stone house dating from the 17th century
Big Flats Historical Society Museum		Big Flats	Chemung	Finger Lakes	Local history	website
Big Springs Museum		Caledonia	Livingston	Finger Lakes	Local history	website, operated by the Big Springs Historical Society
Binghamton University Art Museum		Binghamton	Broome	Central Leatherstocking	Art	Part of Binghamton University
Blenheim-Gilboa Visitors Center		North Blenheim	Schoharie	Capital District	Science	Energy and electricity
Blockhouse Museum & Historic Park		Brewerton	Oswego	Central New York	Local history	Operated by the Fort Brewerton Historical Society, reconstruction of a late 18th-century log block house
Bluff Point Lighthouse		Valcour Island	Clinton	Adirondack Region	Lighthouse	Operated by the Clinton County Historical Association, exhibits about the lighthouse and local history and natural history
Boldt Castle		Alexandria Bay	Jefferson	Thousand Islands	Historic house	Early 20th-century castle house
Bolton Historical Museum		Bolton Landing	Warren	Adirondack Region	Local history	website, operated by the Historical Society of the Town of Bolton
Book of Mormon Historic Publication Site		Palmyra	Wayne	Finger Lakes	Religious	Historic print shop of E. B. Grandin, first publisher of the Book of Mormon
Boonville Black River Canal Museum		Boonville	Oneida	Adirondack Region	Canals	website, history of the Black River Canal
Boscobel		Cold Spring	Putnam	Lower Hudson	Historic house	19th-century mansion and estate
Brain Museum		Buffalo	Erie	Buffalo Niagara Region	Medical	website, also known as the Museum of Neuroanatomy, collection of brain specimens, part of University at Buffalo School of Medicine and Biomedical Sciences
Brick Church Museum		Galen	Wayne	Finger Lakes	Local history	website, operated by the Galen Historical Society
Brick Tavern Stand		Montour Falls	Schuyler	Finger Lakes	Local history	Operated by the Schuyler County Historical Society
Bridge House Museum		Phoenix	Oswego	Central New York	Local history	website
Bronck House		Coxsackie	Greene	Capital District	Historic house	17th-century Dutch homestead, operated by the Greene County Historical Society
Brookfield Museum		Brookfield	Madison	Central Leatherstocking	Local history	website, operated by the Town of Brookfield Historical Society
Brookside Museum		Ballston Spa	Saratoga	Adirondack Region	Local history	Home of the Saratoga County Historical Society
Buffalo AKG Art Museum		Buffalo	Erie	Buffalo Niagara Region	Art	Modern and contemporary art; formerly known as the Buffalo Albright-Knox Gallery
Buffalo and Erie County Naval & Military Park		Buffalo	Erie	Buffalo Niagara Region	Maritime	Home to several decommissioned US Naval vessels including the Cleveland-class cruiser USS Little Rock, the Fletcher-class destroyer USS The Sullivans, and the submarine USS Croaker
Buffalo Fire Historical Museum		Buffalo	Erie	Buffalo Niagara Region	Firefighting	
Buffalo Harbor Museum		Buffalo	Erie	Buffalo Niagara Region	Maritime	website, operated by the Lower Lakes Marine Historical Society, history of the Port of Buffalo, its harbor, waterways and their role in the development of the economies of the Niagara Frontier
Buffalo History Museum		Buffalo	Erie	Buffalo Niagara Region	Local history	Local history, industry, Native Americans, pioneers, ethnic heritage and culture, 19th-century shops and businesses
Buffalo Motorcycle Museum		Buffalo	Erie	Buffalo Niagara Region	Transportation - Motorcycle	website
Buffalo Museum of Science		Buffalo	Erie	Buffalo Niagara Region	Science	Themes include science, animals, astronomy, the science of technology, health
Buffalo Niagara Heritage Village		Amherst	Erie	Buffalo Niagara Region	Open air	12 historic buildings including homes, one-room schoolhouses, a barbershop, and a church, formerly the Amherst Museum
Buffalo, Rochester and Pittsburgh Railway Station		Orchard Park	Erie	Buffalo Niagara Region	Railroad	Operated by the Western New York Railway Historical Society
Buffalo Transportation Pierce-Arrow Museum		Buffalo	Erie	Buffalo Niagara Region	Transportation	website, Pierce-Arrow cars, motorcycles, bicycles and memorabilia
Bull Stone House		Hamptonburgh	Orange	Mid-Hudson	Historic house	Early 18th-century stone house
Bullthistle Model Railroad Society Museum		Norwich	Chenango	Central Leatherstocking	Railroad	website, model railroad layouts
Bundy Museum of History and Art		Binghamton	Broome	Central Leatherstocking	Multiple	Victorian period house, Bundy Manufacturing Company time recorder clocks and artifacts, modern & African art, local history, Southern Tier Broadcasters Hall of Fame, period barber shop
Burchfield-Penney Art Center		Buffalo	Erie	Buffalo Niagara Region	Art	Features works by Charles E. Burchfield, J. J. Lankes and other area artists
Burden Iron Works		Troy	Rensselaer	Capital District	Industry - Iron	Open by appointment only
Busti Grist Mill & Historical Society Museum		Busti	Chautauqua	Buffalo Niagara Region	Mill	Open for annual fall festival and by appointment
Butler Church Museum		Butler	Wayne	Finger Lakes	Local history	Operated by the Butler Historical Society
Call Homestead Museum		Andover	Allegany	Buffalo Niagara Region	History	19th- and 20th-century farm equipment and traditional rural implements, butter churns, crocks, clocks, quilts, toys, musical instruments, furniture, artwork and local pottery
Cambridge Historical Society Museum		Cambridge	Washington	Adirondack Region	Local history	website, Victorian house with period furnishings and local history displays
Camp Santanoni		Newcomb	Essex	Adirondack Region	Historic camp	National Historic Landmark camp open for tours
Camp Shanks World War II Museum		Orangeburg	Rockland	Lower Hudson	Military	Former embarkation point for troops in World War II
Canal Town Museum		Canastota	Madison	Central Leatherstocking	Local history	
Carnegie Art Center		North Tonawanda	Niagara	Buffalo Niagara Region	Art	Contemporary art exhibits, visual art and dance classes
Caroga Historical Museum		Caroga	Fulton	Adirondack Region	Open-air	website, farm house, exhibit barn, general store, cobbler's shop, ice house and Sherman's Park Arcade, operated by the Caroga Historical Association
Carriage House Museum		Camden	Oneida	Central Leatherstocking	Local history	information
Cary Hill Sculpture Park		Salem	Washington	Adirondack Region	Sculpture park	
CAS Arts Center		Livingston Manor	Sullivan	Mid-Hudson	Art	website, operated by the Catskill Art Society
Casey's Cottage		Mexico	Oswego	Thousand Islands	Local history	website, located in Mexico Point State Park, medieval-style cottage
Casparus F. Pruyn House		Newtonville	Albany	Capital District	Historic house	19th-century Greek Revival house, restored one-room schoolhouse, smokehouse, potting shed, woodshed/privy building, carriage house, well house, gardens, historic and cultural arts programs
Castellani Art Museum		Lewiston	Niagara	Buffalo Niagara Region	Art	Contemporary art and folk art, part of Niagara University
Castile Historical Museum		Castile	Wyoming	Buffalo Niagara Region	Local history	website, operated by the Castile Historical Society
Catamount People's Museum		Catskill	Greene	Capital District	Culture	website, people, stories, culture and history of the Catskill Mountains, located in a bobcat-shaped building built out of salvaged wood
Cattaraugus County Museum		Machias	Cattaraugus	Buffalo Niagara Region	Local history	website, also known as the Stone House
Catskill Fly Fishing Center and Museum		Livingston Manor	Sullivan	Mid-Hudson	Sports	
Caverns Creek Grist Mill		Howes Cave	Schoharie	Capital District	Mill	Mill museum and country store
Cayuga Museum of History and Art		Auburn	Cayuga	Finger Lakes	Multiple	Local history, art, culture and the invention of sound film
Central Square Museum		Central Square	Oswego	Thousand Islands	Railroad	website, operated by the Central New York Chapter, National Railway Historical Society
Center for Photography at Woodstock		Kingston, New York	Ulster	Mid-Hudson	Art	website, Artist-centered contemporary photography organization with exhibits
CEPA Gallery		Buffalo	Erie	Buffalo Niagara Region	Art	website, contemporary photography and visual arts center
Champlain Valley Transportation Museum		Plattsburgh	Clinton	Adirondack Region	Transportation	Includes cars, canoes, trains, trolleys and more
Chapman Historical Museum		Glens Falls	Warren	Adirondack Region	Historic house	Late 19th-century period house
Charles Dickert Wildlife Collection		Saranac Lake	Franklin	Adirondack Region	Natural history	website, located on the first floor of the Saranac Lake Free Library, taxidermy specimens of local animals
Charlotte-Genesee Lighthouse		Rochester	Monroe	Finger Lakes	Lighthouse	Operated by the Charlotte-Genesee Lighthouse Historical Society
Charlton Historical Society Museum		Charlton	Saratoga	Adirondack Region	Local history	website
Chautauqua Institution		Chautauqua	Chautauqua	Buffalo Niagara Region	Art	Visual arts gallery, performing arts
Cheektowaga Historical Museum		Cheektowaga	Erie	Buffalo Niagara Region	Local history	Operated by the Cheektowaga Historical Association
Chemung Valley History Museum		Elmira	Chemung	Finger Lakes	Local history	Operated by the Chemung County Historical Society
Chenango Canal Cottage Museum		Bouckville	Madison	Central Leatherstocking	Canals	website, operated by the Chenango Canal Association
Chenango County Historical Society		Norwich	Chenango	Central Leatherstocking	Local history	website
Cherry Valley Museum		Cherry Valley	Otsego	Central Leatherstocking	Local history	website
Children's Museum at Saratoga		Saratoga Springs	Saratoga	Capital District	Children's	website
Children's Museum of Oswego		Oswego	Oswego	Thousand Islands	Children's	website
Children's Museum of Science and Technology		Troy	Rensselaer	Capital District	Science	
Chittenango Landing Canal Boat Museum		Chittenango	Madison	Central Leatherstocking	Canals	Open seasonally, construction and repair of canal boats and the social history of the Erie Canal era
Cigarville Railroad Station Museum		Clay	Onondaga	Central New York	Local history	Operated by the Town of Clay Historical Association in Clay Historic Park
Clarence Historical Museum		Clarence	Erie	Buffalo Niagara Region	Local history	website, operated by the Clarence Historical Society
Clermont State Historic Site		Clermont	Columbia	Capital District	Historic house	1930s period manor house and estate with exhibits about the Livingston family
Clifton F. West Historical Museum		Hague	Warren	Adirondack Region	Local history	website, operated by the Hague Historical Society
Clinton County Historical Museum		Plattsburgh	Clinton	Adirondack Region	Local history	website, operated by the Clinton County Historical Association
Clove Furnace Historic Site		Arden	Orange	Mid-Hudson	Industry - Iron	Iron blast furnace ruins and museum
Cobblestone Society Museum		Childs	Orleans	Buffalo Niagara Region	Local history	1834 church, 1840 house and 1849 house that exemplify area cobblestone architecture
Columbia County Museum		Kinderhook	Columbia	Capital District	Local history	Operated by the Columbia County Historical Society, includes the Luykas Van Alen House, 1850 Ichabod Crane Schoolhouse, 1819 James Vanderpoel House
Colton Museum		Colton	St. Lawrence	Thousand Islands	Local history	website, open daily 10-2 and by appointment with the Colton Historical Society
Constitution Island		West Point	Orange	Mid-Hudson	Historic house - Fort	Tour includes boat ride to and from island, guided tour of Revolutionary War fortifications and 17-room Warner House
Cook Museum of Local History		Galway	Saratoga	Adirondack Region	Local history	Restored Victorian house with Victorian rooms, dolls, clothing, dishes, tools, bibles
Corinth Museum		Corinth	Saratoga	Adirondack Region	Local history	website
Cornerstone Park		Carmel	Putnam	Lower Hudson	Local history	website
Corning Museum of Glass		Corning	Steuben	Finger Lakes	Industry - Glass	
Cottage Lawn Museum		Oneida	Madison	Central Leatherstocking	Historic house	Operated by the Madison County Historical Society, Victorian period house and local history displays
Crandall Public Library Folklife Center		Glens Falls	Warren	Adirondack Region	Multiple	website, exhibits of the history and culture of the upper Hudson Valley and southern Adirondacks of upstate New York
Czurles-Nelson Gallery		Buffalo	Erie	Buffalo Niagara Region	Art	website, part of Buffalo State University
Cropsey Homestead		Hastings-on-Hudson	Westchester	Lower Hudson	Art	Also known as Ever Rest, studio with artwork of Jasper F. Cropsey, operated by the Newington-Cropsey Foundation along with their Gallery of Art, featuring works by Cropsey
Crown Point State Historic Site		Crown Point	Essex	Adirondack Region	Military	Remains of a Colonial era fort and museum
Cuba Cheese Museum		Cuba	Allegany	Buffalo Niagara Region	Food and drink	
Cuba Historical Society Museum		Cuba	Allegany	Buffalo Niagara Region	Local history	
Daniel Parrish Witter Agricultural Museum		Syracuse	Onondaga	Central New York	Agriculture	website, open during the New York State Fair, farming tools, equipment, log cabin, demonstrations, operated by the NYS Agricultural Society
Dansville Area Historical Museum		Dansville	Livingston	Finger Lakes	Local history	website, operated by the Dansville Area Historical Society
Dart Airport Aviation Museum		Mayville	Chautauqua	Buffalo Niagara Region	Aviation	
Darwin D. Martin House		Buffalo	Erie	Buffalo Niagara Region	Historic house	Designed by Frank Lloyd Wright
Das Haus und Der Stahl		Niagara Falls	Niagara	Buffalo Niagara Region	Ethnic	Area German heritage museum in an 1843 home of original settlers
David Crawford House		Newburgh	Orange	Mid-Hudson	Historic house	Operated by the Historical Society of Newburgh Bay and the Highlands
David Sayre Store and House Museum		Milford	Otsego	Central Leatherstocking	History	Facebook site, early 19th-century period store operated by the Greater Milford Historical Association
Dayton Historical Museum		Dayton	Cattaraugus	Buffalo Niagara Region	Local history	
Dayton's Corners School		Penfield	Monroe	Finger Lakes	Education	Open during special events; one-room schoolhouse
De Kalb Historical Association Museum		De Kalb	St. Lawrence	Thousand Islands	Local history	
Delaware and Hudson Canal Museum		High Falls	Ulster	Mid-Hudson	Canals	History of the Delaware & Hudson Canal, operated by the D & H Canal Historical Society
Deposit Historical Society Museum		Deposit	Delaware	Central Leatherstocking	Local history	website
DeRuyter Museum		DeRuyter	Madison	Central Leatherstocking	Local history	Operated by the Tromptown Historical Society
DeWint House		Tappan	Rockland	Lower Hudson	Historic house	18th-century Colonial Dutch house, temporary headquarters of Commander-in-Chief George Washington during the American Revolution
Dia Beacon		Beacon	Dutchess	Mid-Hudson	Art	one of the twelve locations and sites the Dia Art Foundation manages.
DIRT Museum & Hall of Fame		Weedsport	Cayuga	Finger Lakes	Automotive	website, classic cars, stock cars, memorabilia and a drivers' hall of fame
Discovery Center of the Southern Tier		Binghamton	Broome	Central Leatherstocking	Children's	website
Donald M. Kendall Sculpture Gardens		Purchase	Westchester	Lower Hudson	Sculpture park	Collection of 45 pieces of outdoor sculpture at the Pepsico world headquarters
Dowd Gallery		Cortland	Cortland	Finger Lakes	Art	website, part of State University of New York at Cortland
Dr. John Quincy Howe House		Phelps	Ontario	Finger Lakes	Local history	Operated as a museum of local history by the Phelps Community Historical Society
Dunkirk Lighthouse & Veterans Museum		Dunkirk	Chautauqua	Buffalo Niagara Region	Military	Lighthouse and keeper's cottage with collection of military artifacts
Dunkirk Historical Museum		Dunkirk	Chautauqua	Buffalo Niagara Region	Local history	website, local history, art and culture, includes Brooks Locomotive Works equipment and artifacts
Durham Center Museum		East Durham	Greene	Capital District	Local history	
Dyke Museum		Wellsville	Allegany	Buffalo Niagara Region	Local history	Operated by The Thelma Rogers Genealogical & Historical Society
East Bloomfield Historical Society		East Bloomfield	Ontario	Finger Lakes	Local history	website
East Otto Historical Museum		East Otto	Cattaraugus	Buffalo Niagara Region	Local history	
Edith Langley Barrett Fine Art Gallery		Utica	Oneida	Adirondack Region	Art	website, part of Utica University
Edmonston House		New Windsor	Orange	Mid-Hudson	Historic house	18th-century period house
Edward Hopper House Art Center		Nyack	Rockland	Lower Hudson	Art	
Edwin Welling Van Duzer Memorial House		Middletown	Orange	Mid-Hudson	Historic house	Facebook site, home of the Historical Society of Middletown & the Wallkill Precinct
El Museo Francisco Oller y Diego Rivera		Buffalo	Erie	Buffalo Niagara Region	Art	website, exhibition of fine art by Latin/Caribbean, African-American and other artists of color
Elbert Hubbard Roycroft Museum		East Aurora	Erie	Buffalo Niagara Region	Historic house	Arts and Crafts movement style home featuring furniture and decorative items produced by the Roycroft community, located in the George and Gladys Scheidemantel House
Eleanor Roosevelt National Historic Site		Hyde Park	Dutchess	Mid-Hudson	Historic house	
Eleazer Harding House		Otisville	Orange	Mid-Hudson	Historic house	information, operated by Mount Hope Historical Society
Elijah Miller House		White Plains	Westchester	Lower Hudson	Historic house	18th-century farmhouse used during the Revolutionary War by General George Washington as a headquarters command post during the Battle of White Plains
Elizabeth Cady Stanton House		Seneca Falls	Seneca	Finger Lakes	Historic house	Part of Women's Rights National Historical Park
Ellenville Public Library and Museum		Ellenville	Ulster	Mid-Hudson	Local history	website, known as the Terwilliger House Museum
Ellicottville Historical Museum		Ellicottville	Cattaraugus	Buffalo Niagara Region	Local history	Open seasonally
Elma Historical Society Museum		Elma	Erie	Buffalo Niagara Region	Local history	website, local history, also 1847 water-powered saw mill
Empire State Aerosciences Museum		Glenville	Schenectady	Capital District	Aviation	
Empire State Heritage Park		Rome	Oneida	Central New York	Canals	website, formerly Erie Canal Village, area canal heritage
Empire State Railway Museum		Phoenicia	Ulster	Mid-Hudson	Railroad	
Empire State Theater Musical Instrument Museum		Syracuse	Onondaga	Central New York	Music	website, located in the Empire Expo Center and open during the New York State Fair, theater organs
Endicott Visitor Center		Endicott	Broome	Central Leatherstocking	Local history	website, includes a museum of local history
Erie Canal Discovery Center		Lockport	Niagara	Buffalo Niagara Region	Canals	website, operated by the Niagara County Historical Society, construction and operations of the Erie Canal
Erie Canal Depot		Palmyra	Wayne	Finger Lakes	Local history	, history of the Erie Canal in the depot at Historic Palmyra
Erie Canal Museum		Syracuse	Onondaga	Central New York	Canals	History of the Erie Canal
Erie Canal Park		Camillus	Onondaga	Finger Lakes	History	website, includes Sims' Store Museum, replica of the original Sims' canal store, and a steam engine exhibit
Esperance Historical Museum		Esperance	Schoharie	Capital District	Local history	Facebook site, operated by the Esperance Historical Society
Everson Museum of Art		Syracuse	Onondaga	Central New York	Art	American art
Explore & More Children's Museum		East Aurora	Erie	Buffalo Niagara Region	Children's	
Fannie Bartlett House/Olean Point Museum		Olean	Cattaraugus	Buffalo Niagara Region	Local history	information, information
FASNY Museum of Firefighting		Hudson	Columbia	Capital District	Firefighting	website, heritage of firefighting in New York State
Fenimore Art Museum		Cooperstown	Otsego	Central Leatherstocking	Art	American Folk, North American Indian, Hudson River School and 19th-century genre art and American photography
Fenimore Farm & Country Village		Cooperstown	Otsego	Central Leatherstocking	Agriculture	Living farm museum, formerly The Farmers' Museum
Fenton History Center		Jamestown	Chautauqua	Buffalo Niagara Region	Local history	
Fiddlers Hall of Fame and Museum		Redfield	Oswego	Adirondack Region	Music	website, operated by the New York State Old Tyme Fiddlers' Association
Finger Lakes Boating Museum		Penn Yan	Yates	Finger Lakes	Maritime	website, over 60 Finger-Lakes-built boats
Fire Museum of Syracuse		Syracuse	Onondaga	Central New York	Firefighting	Open by appointment only
Fleischmanns Museum of Memories		Fleischmanns	Delaware	Central Leatherstocking	Local history	Located behind the Skene Memorial Library and open from Memorial Day through Labor Day
Fort Crailo		Rensselaer	Rensselaer	Capital District	Historic house	Colonial New Netherland history, also known as Crailo State Historic Site
Fort Decker Museum of History		Port Jervis	Orange	Mid-Hudson	Historic house	Operated as a local history museum by the Minisink Valley Historical Society
Fort Delaware Museum		Narrowsburg	Sullivan	Mid-Hudson	Open air	website, depiction of the life of pioneers who settled in the Upper Delaware Valley in 1754
Fort Drum Museum		Fort Drum	Jefferson	Thousand Islands	Military	website, history of the 10th Mountain Division and Fort Drum, Facebook site
Fort Klock		St. Johnsville	Montgomery	Mohawk Valley	Open air	Revolutionary era historic homestead, Colonial Dutch Barn, blacksmith shop, and 19th-century schoolhouse
Fort Montgomery State Historic Site		Fort Montgomery	Orange	Mid-Hudson	Military	American Revolutionary War site and museum
Fort Ontario		Oswego	Oswego	Adirondack Region	Military	Star-shaped fort restored to its 1868-1872 appearance
Fort Plain Museum & Historical Park		Fort Plain	Montgomery	Central Leatherstocking	History	website, Revolutionary War headquarters of Marinus Willett
Fort Stanwix National Monument		Rome	Oneida	Adirondack Region	Military	Reconstructed Colonial fort, important site during the American Revolutionary War, living history enactments
Fort Ticonderoga		Ticonderoga	Essex	Adirondack Region	Military	Revolutionary fort with costumed interpreters represent 18th-century soldiers and refugee women
Fort William Henry		Lake George	Warren	Adirondack Region	Military	French & Indian War fort with costumed interpreters
Fosdick-Nelson Gallery		Alfred	Allegany	Buffalo Niagara Region	Art	website, part of Alfred University, contemporary art
Foster Cottage Museum		Clifton Springs	Ontario	Finger Lakes	Historic house	website, operated by the Clifton Springs Historical Society
Foster Farm Museum		Brewster	Putnam	Lower Hudson	Agriculture	Historic farm featuring rare and endangered early American farm animals, farm equipment, rock and roll memorabilia
Frances Lehman Loeb Art Center		Poughkeepsie	Dutchess	Mid-Hudson	Art	Part of Vassar College
Franklin D. Roosevelt Presidential Library and Museum		Hyde Park	Dutchess	Mid-Hudson	Biographical	
Franklin House of History		Malone	Franklin	Adirondack Region	Historic house	website, operated by the Franklin County Historical and Museum Society
Frederic Remington Art Museum		Ogdensburg	St. Lawrence	Thousand Islands	Art	Works of Frederic Remington
Fred J. Johnston Museum		Kingston	Ulster	Mid-Hudson	Historic house	website, operated by Friends of Historic Kingston, 1812 house with collection of 18th and early 19th century furnishings and decorative arts
Friends of Historic Kingston Museum		Kingston	Ulster	Mid-Hudson	Local history	website, operated by Friends of Historic Kingston
Frisbee House and Museum		Delhi	Delaware	Central Leatherstocking	Open air	Operated by the Delaware County Historical Association, home to 7 historic buildings including the 1797 Frisbee House
Frontenac Museum		Union Springs	Cayuga	Finger Lakes	Local history	website, operated by the Frontenac Historical Society
Fryer Memorial Museum		Munnsville	Madison	Central Leatherstocking	Local history	website
Fulton County Museum		Gloversville	Fulton	Adirondack Region	Local history	website, operated by the Fulton County Historical Society
Ganondagan State Historic Site		Victor	Ontario	Finger Lakes	Native American	Seneca village
Gates House Museum		Warsaw	Wyoming	Buffalo Niagara Region	Local history	Operated by the Warsaw Historical Society, 19th-century house
Gateway Museum		Morristown	St. Lawrence	Thousand Islands	History	website, local history, culture
General Richard Montgomery House		Rhinebeck	Dutchess	Mid-Hudson	Historic house	website, occupied by General Richard Montgomery during the American Revolutionary War, open by appointment with the Chancellor Livingston Chapter, NSDAR
Genesee Country Village and Museum		Mumford	Monroe	Finger Lakes	Open air	19th-century living history museum, includes John L. Wehle Gallery of Sporting Art, Genesee Country Nature Center, Carriage Museum, Silver Baseball Park and Heirloom Gardens
Geneva History Museum		Geneva	Ontario	Finger Lakes	Local history	website, located in the Prouty-Chew House, operated by the Geneva Historical Society
George Barton House		Buffalo	Erie	Buffalo Niagara Region	Historic house	Designed by Frank Lloyd Wright
George Eastman Museum		Rochester	Monroe	Finger Lakes	Photography	Historic mansion with exhibits on photography and film
Georgetown Historical Society Museum		Georgetown	Madison	Central Leatherstocking	Local history	
Georgi on the Battenkill Museum and Park		Shushan	Washington	Adirondack Region	Art	website, Italian, Dutch, Flemish, German and French paintings from the 14th through the 18th centuries, Chinese and Asian tapestries and figurines
Gerrit Smith Estate		Peterboro	Madison	Finger Lakes	Historic house	19th-century house, site along the Underground Railroad
Gilboa Museum		Gilboa	Schoharie	Mohawk Valley	Local history	website, fossils, local history, operated by the Gilboa Historical Society
Glebe House		Poughkeepsie	Dutchess	Mid-Hudson	Historic house	18th-century period house
Glenn H. Curtiss Museum		Hammondsport	Steuben	Finger Lakes	Aviation	Early aviation and local history
Gomez Mill House		Newburgh	Orange	Mid-Hudson	Historic house	Earliest surviving Jewish residence in North America
Goodsell Museum		Old Forge	Herkimer	Adirondack Region	Local history	Operated by the Town of Webb Historical Association
Gouverneur Museum		Gouverneur	St. Lawrence	Thousand Islands	Local history	website
Granger Homestead and Carriage Museum		Canandaigua	Ontario	Finger Lakes	Historic house	19th-century period mansion, collection of carriages
Grant Cottage State Historic Site		Wilton	Saratoga	Capital District	Historic house	Late 19th-century period house where President Ulysses S. Grant died in 1885
Graycliff		Derby	Erie	Buffalo Niagara Region	Historic house	Designed by Frank Lloyd Wright
Great Camp Sagamore		Raquette Lake	Hamilton	Adirondack Region	Historic camp	National Historic Landmark camp open for tours
Greater Oneonta Historical Society History Center		Oneonta	Otsego	Central Leatherstocking	Local history	website
Greece Museum		Greece	Monroe	Finger Lakes	Local history	website, operated by the Greece Historical Society
Greenfield Park Museum		Wawarsing	Ulster	Mid-Hudson	Education	One-room schoolhouse
Griffis International Sculpture Garden		Rome	Oneida	Central New York	Art	website, outdoor art park, works created by Sculpture Space in Griffiss Business and Technology Park
Griffis Sculpture Park		East Otto	Cattaraugus	Buffalo Niagara Region	Sculpture park	425-acre (1.72 km^{2}) outdoor art museum
Groton Historical Association Museum		Groton	Tompkins	Finger Lakes	Local history	
H.P. Sears Oil Co. Service Station Museum		Rome	Oneida	Central New York	Automotive	website, restored service station with automotive memorabilia
Hagadorn House		Almond	Allegany	Buffalo Niagara Region	Historic house	website, operated by the Almond Historical Society
Half-Shire Historical Society Museum		Richland	Oswego	Adirondack Region	Local history	website
Hallwalls Contemporary Arts Center		Buffalo	Erie	Buffalo Niagara Region	Art	Showcases artists of diverse backgrounds in film, video, literature, music, performance, media and visual arts
Hamilton Hill Arts Center		Schenectady	Schenectady	Capital District	Art	website, African and African American art and culture
Hamlin's North Star History Center		Hamlin	Monroe	Finger Lakes	Local history	
Hammond Historical Museum		Hammond	St. Lawrence	Thousand Islands	Local history	website, operated by the R.T. Elethorp Historical Society
Hammond Museum and Japanese Stroll Garden		North Salem	Westchester	Lower Hudson	Art	East Asian art and culture and Japanese garden
Hancock House Museum		Ticonderoga	Essex	Adirondack Region	Local history	Operated by the Ticonderoga Historical Society
Handwerker Gallery		Ithaca	Tompkins	Finger Lakes	Art	website, part of Ithaca College
Hanford Mills Museum		East Meredith	Delaware	Central Leatherstocking	Mill	Sawmill, gristmill, feed mill, woodworking shop and hardware store
Harmony Historical Society		Blockville	Chautauqua	Buffalo Niagara Region	Local history	website
Harness Racing Museum & Hall of Fame		Goshen	Orange	Mid-Hudson	Sports	
Harriet Tubman Home		Auburn	Cayuga	Finger Lakes	Biographical	Place where Harriet Tubman spent her last years
Hart-Cluett Mansion		Troy	Rensselaer	Capital District	Historic house	Operated by the Rensselaer County Historical Society, 19th-century period rowhouse
Hartford Museum & Howard Hanna Memorial Civil War Enlistment Center		Hartford	Washington	Adirondack Region	Local history	Museum located in the Elisha Straight House; depicts life and local industry in the 19th century; center depicts the history of the area men who enlisted for the American Civil War
Hastings Historical Society		Hastings-on-Hudson	Westchester	Lower Hudson	Local history	website
Haverstraw Brick Museum		Haverstraw	Rockland	Lower Hudson	Industry	website, area brick making industry
Hawkins Point Visitors Center		Massena	St. Lawrence	Thousand Islands	Science	website, operated by the New York Power Authority at the St. Lawrence-FDR Power Project, exhibits about energy, electricity and the North Country
Heart's Delight Farm		Chazy	Clinton	Adirondack Region	Agriculture	Operated by the Miner Institute, farm history and demonstrations, life of founder William Miner and his railroad inventions
Henderson Historical Society and Museum		Henderson	Jefferson	Thousand Islands	Local history	website
Herbert F. Johnson Museum of Art		Ithaca	Tompkins	Finger Lakes	Art	Part of Cornell University
Heritage Discovery Center Buffalo		Buffalo	Erie	Buffalo Niagara Region	Industry	website, railway, steel and industrial heritage of Western New York, includes the Steel Plant Museum, Western New York Railway Historical Society and other organizations
Heritage Museum on the Hemlock Fairgrounds		Hemlock	Livingston	Finger Lakes	History	website, open during the fair and by appointment
Heritage Square Museum		Ontario	Wayne	Finger Lakes	Open air	Buildings from the mid-19th century
Herkimer County Historical Society Suiter Building Museum		Herkimer	Herkimer	Adirondack Region	Local history	
Herkimer County Jail		Herkimer	Herkimer	Adirondack Region	Prison	Tours given by the Herkimer County Historical Society
Herkimer Diamond Mines Museum		Herkimer	Herkimer	Adirondack Region	Natural history	website, includes the Herkimer Diamond Mines Gift Shop, Museum, and Prospecting Area, includes exhibits of minerals and fossils
Herkimer Home State Historic Site		Danube	Herkimer	Adirondack Region	Historic house	18th-century period house
Heroes of Baseball Wax Museum		Cooperstown	Otsego	Central Leatherstocking	Sport	website
Herschell Carrousel Factory Museum		North Tonawanda	Niagara	Buffalo Niagara Region	Carrousel	Housed in an original carousel factory building
Hervey Ely House		Rochester	Monroe	Finger Lakes	Historic house	19th-century mansion, operated by the Irondequoit chapter of the Daughters of the American Revolution
Hessel Museum of Art		Annandale-on-Hudson	Dutchess	Mid-Hudson	Art	Part of Bard College, contemporary art
High Falls Interpretive Center and Museum		Rochester	Monroe	Finger Lakes	Local history	website, local history, industry, culture, art, operated by the Office of the City Historian
Hill-Hold Museum		Hamptonburgh	Orange	Mid-Hudson	Historic house	Hudson Valley farm in the 1830s
Historic Cherry Hill		Albany	Albany	Capital District	Historic house	17th-century house reflecting owners through the 19th century
Historic Huguenot Street		Gardiner	Ulster	Mid-Hudson	Open air	Tours of historic houses, including Locust Lawn Estate, operated by the Huguenot Historical Society
Historic Pittsford Museum		Pittsford	Monroe	Finger Lakes	Local history	website
Historical Society of Rockland County History Center Museum		New City	Rockland	Lower Hudson	Local history	website
The Historical Society and Museum		Tarrytown	Westchester	Lower Hudson	Local history	website, history of Tarrytown and Sleepy Hollow, located in the Jacob Odell House
The History Center in Tompkins County		Ithaca	Tompkins	Finger Lakes	History	website
History House		Moravia	Cayuga	Finger Lakes	Local history	website, operated by the Cayuga-Owasco Lakes Historical Society
H. Lee White Marine Museum		Oswego	Oswego	Adirondack Region	Maritime	Boats, ship models, sailmakers' tools, navigational equipment, nautically themed painting, nautical artifacts; home of the World War II-era tugboat Nash
Hobart Historical Center		Hobart	Delaware	Central Leatherstocking	Local history	
Hoffman Clock Museum		Newark	Wayne	Finger Lakes	Horology	website, history of timekeeping, includes over 300 clocks, watches and tools
Holland Land Office Museum		Batavia	Genesee	Buffalo Niagara Region	Local history	History of the Holland Land Company
Holocaust Museum & Center for Tolerance and Education		Suffern	Rockland	Lower Hudson	History	website, located at Rockland Community College
Home of Franklin D. Roosevelt National Historic Site		Hyde Park	Dutchess	Mid-Hudson	Historic house	
Hopkinton Town Museum		Hopkinton	St. Lawrence	Thousand Islands	Local history	information
Horace Greeley House		Chappaqua	Westchester	Lower Hudson	Historic house	Operated by the New Castle Historical Society, 19th-century home of newspaper editor and later presidential candidate Horace Greeley
Horicon Museum		Brant Lake	Warren	Adirondack Region	Local history	website, operated by the Town of Horicon Historical Society
Hornell Erie Depot Museum		Hornell	Steuben	Finger Lakes	Railroad	website, Erie Railroad memorabilia
Horseheads Historical Society Depot Museum		Horseheads	Chemung	Finger Lakes	Local history	website
House of Frankenstein Wax Museum		Lake George	Warren	Adirondack Region	Wax	website, wax models of scary figures
Howe Caverns		Howes	Schoharie	Capital District	Natural history	Cavern tours and the Cave House Museum of Mining & Geology
Howland Stone Store Museum		Sherwood	Cayuga	Finger Lakes	Local history	
Hudson Highlands Nature Museum		Cornwall	Orange	Mid-Hudson	Natural history	website
Hudson River Maritime Museum		Kingston	Ulster	Mid-Hudson	Maritime	History of shipping, boating and industry on the Hudson River and its tributaries; operates the Rondout Light for tours
Hudson River Museum		Yonkers	Westchester	Lower Hudson	Multiple	Art, natural history, planetarium
Hunting Tavern Museum		Andes	Delaware	Central Leatherstocking	Historic site	website, operated by the Andes Society for History and Culture
Hurley Heritage Society Museum		Kingston	Ulster	Mid-Hudson	Historic house	website, also known as Col. Jonathan Elmendorf House
Hyde Collection		Glens Falls	Warren	Adirondack Region	Art	Private art collection in original home context, includes American, French and Italian art, furnishings, textiles, silver and ceramics
Hyde Hall		Springfield	Otsego	Central Leatherstocking	Historic house	Adjacent to Glimmerglass State Park, turn-of-the-19th-century mansion
Hyde Park Station		Hyde Park	Dutchess	Mid-Hudson	Railroad	Includes area's railroad history, artifacts and model railroad
Interlaken Historical Society Museum		Interlaken	Seneca	Finger Lakes	Local history	website
International Boxing Hall of Fame		Canastota	Madison	Central Leatherstocking	Sports	
International Mask & Puppet Museum		Syracuse	Onondaga	Finger Lakes	Puppetry	website, part of Open Hand Theater
International Motor Racing Research Center		Watkins Glen	Schuyler	Finger Lakes	Sports	Archives, research library & exhibits
Ira G. Ross Aerospace Museum		Buffalo	Erie	Buffalo Niagara Region	Aerospace	Formerly the Niagara Aerospace Museum
Irish American Heritage Museum		Albany	Albany	Capital District	Ethnic	History and heritage of the Irish in America
Iron Center Museum		Port Henry	Essex	Adirondack Region	Industry - Iron	Railroad and mining history, operated by the Moriah Historical Society
Iron Island Museum		Buffalo	Erie	Buffalo Niagara Region	Local history	website, operated by the Iron Island Preservation Society of Lovejoy
Iroquois Indian Museum		Howes Cave	Schoharie	Capital District	Native American	Iroquois culture and art
Jacob Blauvelt House		New City	Rockland	Lower Hudson	Historic house	Operated by the Historical Society of Rockland County, mid-19th-century period farmhouse
Jacob Purdy House		White Plains	Westchester	Lower Hudson	Historic house	Maintained by the White Plains Historical Society, George Washington's headquarters during the Battle of White Plains 1776 and in 1778
Jacob T. Walden Stone House		Walden	Orange	Mid-Hudson	Historic house	18th-century period house operated by the Walden Historical Society
Jamesville Community Museum		Jamesville	Onondaga	Central New York	Local history	Located in the former Saint Mark's Church
Java Historical Society Museum		Java	Wyoming	Buffalo Niagara Region	Local history	Operated by appointment
Jay Heritage Center		Rye	Westchester	Lower Hudson	Historic house	Home of and museum about John Jay
Jean Hasbrouck House		New Paltz	Ulster	Mid-Hudson	Historic house	Part of Historic Huguenot Street, early 18th-century Dutch house
Jefferson County Historical Society Museum		Watertown	Jefferson	Thousand Islands	Local history	
Jell-O Gallery		Le Roy	Genesee	Buffalo Niagara Region	Food and drink	Operated by the Le Roy Historical Society, history and memorabilia of Jell-O
John Brown Farm and Gravesite		North Elba	Essex	Adirondack Region	Historic house	Home and final resting place of abolitionist John Brown
John D. Murray Firefighters Museum		Oswego	Oswego	Adirondack Region	Firefighting	Facebook site
John Jay Homestead State Historic Site		Katonah	Westchester	Lower Hudson	Historic house	
John Kane House		Pawling	Dutchess	Mid-Hudson	Historic house	Operated by the Historical Society of Quaker Hill and Pawling, 18th-century house with period furnishings and local history exhibits
Johnson Hall State Historic Site		Johnstown	Fulton	Adirondack Region	Historic house	18th-century home of Sir William Johnson, an Irish pioneer and British Indian agent in the Province of New York
Johnstown Historical Society Museum		Johnstown	Fulton	Adirondack Region	Local history	
Johnston House		Geneva	Seneca	Finger Lakes	Historic house	website, operated by the Geneva Historical Society, contains the Mike Weaver Drain Tile Museum
John William Draper House		Hastings-on-Hudson	Westchester	Lower Hudson	Historic house	Museum of the Hastings Historical Society
Joseph Horton House		Wappingers Falls	Dutchess	Mid-Hudson	Historic house	Pre-Revolutionary War Dutch Colonial home, open by appointment
Joseph Smith Farm		Palmyra	Wayne	Finger Lakes	Historic house	Home and farm of Latter Day Saint movement founder Joseph Smith, Jr.
Karpeles Manuscript Library Museum		Buffalo	Erie	Buffalo Niagara Region	Library	
Karpeles Manuscript Library Museum		Newburgh	Orange	Mid-Hudson	Library	Exhibits from its collections
Katonah Museum of Art		Katonah	Westchester	Lower Hudson	Art	
Kenan Center		Lockport	Niagara	Buffalo Niagara Region	Art	website, visual and performing arts center with gallery
Kent-Delord House Museum		Plattsburgh	Clinton	Adirondack Region	Historic house	Features 19th-century period furnishings
Kiersted House Museum		Saugerties	Ulster	Mid-Hudson	Historic house	Operated by the Saugerties Historical Society, 18th-century house
Kinetic Gallery		Geneseo	Livingston	Finger Lakes	Art	website, part of SUNY Geneseo
Kinnear Museum of Local History		Lake Luzerne	Warren	Adirondack Region	Local history	website, operated by the Hadley-Luzerne Historical Society
Klyne Esopus Museum		Esopus	Ulster	Mid-Hudson	Local history	
Knickerbocker Mansion		Schaghticoke	Rensselaer	Capital District	Historic house	Operated by the Knickerbocker Historical Society, late 18th-century mansion
Knight-Sutton Museum		Akron	Erie	Buffalo Niagara Region	Local history	website, operated by the Newstead Historical Society
Knox's Headquarters State Historic Site		New Windsor	Orange	Mid-Hudson	Historic house	Revolutionary War headquarters for General Henry Knox
Kykuit		Mount Pleasant	Westchester	Lower Hudson	Historic house	Also known as John D. Rockefeller Estate, 40-room mansion with art collection, gardens
Lake George Historical Association Museum		Lake George	Warren	Adirondack Region	Local history	website
Lake Placid Winter Olympic Museum		Lake Placid	Essex	Adirondack Region	Sports	Memorabilia of the 1932 & 1980 Lake Placid Winter Olympics
Lake Placid-North Elba Historical Society Museum		Lake Placid	Essex	Adirondack Region	Local history	website
Lake Pleasant Museum		Lake Pleasant	Hamilton	Adirondack Region	Local history	Operated by the Historical Society of Lake Pleasant & Speculator
Lancaster District School No. 6		Lancaster	Erie	Buffalo Niagara Region	Education	Open by appointment with the Lancaster Historical Society
Lancaster Historical Society Museum		Lancaster	Erie	Buffalo Niagara Region	Local history	website
Lansing Manor House		North Blenheim	Schoharie	Capital District	Historic house	Early 19th-century period house
Le Roy House		LeRoy	Genesee	Buffalo Niagara Region	Historic house	Operated by the Le Roy Historical Society
Lederer Lockhart Bridge Galleries		Geneseo	Livingston	Finger Lakes	Art	website, three art galleries at State University of New York at Geneseo
Lehigh Valley Railroad Historical Society Station Museum		Shortsville	Ontario	Finger Lakes	Railroad	website
Leon Historical Society Museum		Leon	Cattaraugus	Buffalo Niagara Region	Local history	
Lewiston Museum		Lewiston	Niagara	Buffalo Niagara Region	Local history	website, operated by the Historical Association of Lewiston
Liberty Museum & Arts Center		Liberty	Sullivan	Mid-Hudson	Art	website
Light Work		Syracuse	Onondaga	Central New York	Art	Non-profit photography center
Lincoln Depot Museum		Peekskill	Westchester	Lower Hudson	Biographical	History and ties between Abraham Lincoln and Peekskill
Lisbon Depot Museum		Lisbon	St. Lawrence	Thousand Islands	Local history	Town's social, agricultural and railway history
Little Falls New York Historical Society & Museum		Little Falls	Herkimer	Adirondack Region	Local history	website
Little Red Schoolhouse Museum		Chestnut Ridge	Rockland	Lower Hudson	Education	website, operated by the East Ramapo School District
Little Red School House Museum		Sterling	Cayuga	Finger Lakes	Local history	Operated by the Sterling Historical Society
Liverpool Village Museum		Liverpool	Onondaga	Finger Lakes	Local history	Changing exhibits of local history, grounds also include the Liverpool Willow Museum about the local willow weaving industry, located in the Lucius Gleason House
Livingston Art Center		Mount Morris	Livingston	Finger Lakes	Art	website, art center with New Deal Gallery, featuring Works Progress Administration art from the Great Depression, and the Apartment One Gallery for exhibits of regional art
Livingston County Historical Society Museum		Geneseo	Livingston	Finger Lakes	Local history	website
Livingston History Barn		Livingston	Columbia	Capital District	Local history	website
Locust Grove (Samuel F. B. Morse House)		Poughkeepsie	Dutchess	Mid-Hudson	Historic house	19th-century period furnished house, exhibit on telegraph inventor Samuel Morse
Locust Lawn Estate		Gardiner	Ulster	Mid-Hudson	Historic house	19th-century farm complex, part of Historic Huguenot Street
Longyear Museum of Anthropology		Hamilton	Madison	Central Leatherstocking	Anthropology	Part of Colgate University, archaeological and ethnographic materials from Africa, Oceania, and the pre-Columbian cultures of North, Central, and South America
Lorenzo State Historic Site		Cazenovia	Madison	Central Leatherstocking	Historic house	Early 19th-century mansion
Louis Miller Museum		Hoosick Falls	Rensselaer	Finger Lakes	Local history	website, operated by Hoosick Township Historical Society
Lucille Ball-Desi Arnaz Center		Jamestown	Chautauqua	Buffalo Niagara Region	Biographical	Memorabilia of television stars Lucille Ball and Desi Arnaz
Lucille Wright Air Museum		Jamestown	Chautauqua	Buffalo Niagara Region	Aerospace	website, air and space education, planetarium
Lyndhurst (Jay Gould Estate)		Tarrytown	Westchester	Lower Hudson	Historic house	19th-century mansion in 67-acre (270,000 m^{2}) park
Lyon Mountain Mining and Railroad Museum		Lyon Mountain	Clinton	Adirondack Region	Local history	Includes history of Lyon Mountain mines and the D & H Railroad
Mabee Farm Historic Site		Rotterdam Junction	Schenectady	Capital District	Historic house	17th-century Dutch farm, oldest house still standing in the Mohawk Valley, operated by the Schenectady County Historical Society
Madam Brett Homestead		Beacon	Dutchess	Mid-Hudson	Historic house	Operated by the Daughters of the American Revolution, early 18th-century home
Mandeville Gallery		Schenectady	Schenectady	Capital District	Art	Part of Union College, located in the Nott Memorial, changing exhibits of contemporary art, history and science
Manitoga		Garrison	Putnam	Lower Hudson	Historic house	20th-century home of industrial designer Russel Wright, tours by reservation
Manlius Historical Museum		Manlius	Onondaga	Finger Lakes	Local history	website, operated by the Manlius Historical Society
Maple Grove (Poughkeepsie, New York)		Poughkeepsie	Dutchess	Mid-Hudson	Historic house	Mid-19th-century house under restoration
Marble Schoolhouse		Eastchester	Westchester	Lower Hudson	Local history	Open by appointment with the Eastchester Historical Society
Marcella Sembrich Opera Museum		Bolton Landing	Warren	Adirondack Region	Music	Home of opera star Marcella Sembrich, includes fine and decorative arts, personal opera mementos, photographs, costumes, hosts concerts
Margaret Reaney Memorial Library & Museum		St. Johnsville	Montgomery	Capital District	Local history	website, includes fine art, sculpture, household and military items
Marian E. White Anthropology Research Museum		Buffalo	Erie	Buffalo Niagara Region	Science	Research collection of North American archaeological items, part of University at Buffalo
Mark Twain Study		Elmira	Chemung	Finger Lakes	Biographical	website, part of Elmira College, octagonal building where author Mark Twain wrote many of his books
Martin Van Buren National Historic Site		Kinderhook	Columbia	Capital District	Historic house	Mid-19th-century mansion and estate of President Martin Van Buren
Martisco Station Railway Museum		Camillus	Onondaga	Finger Lakes	Railroad	Operated by the Central New York Chapter, National Railway Historical Society
Massena Museum		Massena	St. Lawrence	Thousand Islands	Local history	website
Matilda Joslyn Gage Home		Fayetteville	Onondaga	Central New York	Biographical	website, restored home with exhibits about the life of suffragist, abolitionist and author Matilda Joslyn Gage
Maurice F. Sweeney Museum		Livonia	Livingston	Finger Lakes	Local history	website, operated by the Livonia Area Preservation & Historical Society
Maybrook Railroad Museum		Maybrook	Orange	Mid-Hudson	Railroad	
Mayville Depot Museum		Mayville	Chautauqua	Buffalo Niagara Region	Local history	Operated by the Chautauqua Town Historical Society in a historic depot
M'Clintock House		Waterloo	Seneca	Finger Lakes	History	Mid-19th-century house is part of Women's Rights National Historical Park
McClurg Museum		Westfield	Chautauqua	Buffalo Niagara Region	Historic house	Operated by the Chautauqua County Historical Society, 19th-century period mansion
Medina Historical Society Museum		Medina	Orleans	Buffalo Niagara Region	Local history	website
Medina Railroad Museum		Medina	Orleans	Buffalo Niagara Region	Railroad	
Medora Ball Museum		Otto	Cattaraugus	Buffalo Niagara Region	Local history	
Memorial Art Gallery		Rochester	Monroe	Finger Lakes	Art	European and Asian art and antiquities, American art, antiquities from Ancient Greece, Rome and the Middle East; part of the University of Rochester
Merestead		Mount Kisco	Westchester	Lower Hudson	Historic house	Early 20th-century mansion and estate, tours by advance reservation
Mexico Historical Society Museum		Mexico	Oswego	Thousand Islands	Local history	Facebook site
Mid-Hudson Children's Museum		Poughkeepsie	Dutchess	Mid-Hudson	Children's	
Middlebury Historical Society		Wyoming	Wyoming	Buffalo Niagara Region	Local history	
Midway State Park		Maple Springs	Chautauqua	Buffalo Niagara Region	Amusement	Historic amusement park with museum
Military History Society of Rochester		Rochester	Monroe	Finger Lakes	Military	website U.S. Military artifacts from the War of 1812 through current times.
Mill Museum		Galen	Wayne	Finger Lakes	Agriculture	website, operated by the Galen Historical Society, farming and household items
Millard Fillmore House		East Aurora	Erie	Buffalo Niagara Region	Historic house	19th-century period home of President Millard Fillmore
Mills Mansion		Mount Morris	Livingston	Finger Lakes	Historic house	Mid-19th-century period home, operated by the Mount Morris Historical Society
Milton J. Rubenstein Museum of Science and Technology		Syracuse	Onondaga	Finger Lakes	Science	Often referred to as the MOST
Miner's Cabin		Franklinville	Cattaraugus	Buffalo Niagara Region	Historic house	website, operated by the Ischua Valley Historical Society
Minerva Historical Society Museum		Olmstedville	Essex	Adirondack Region	Local history	website
Mohawk Valley Center for the Arts		Little Falls	Herkimer	Adirondack Region	Art	website
Montgomery Place		Annandale-on-Hudson	Dutchess	Mid-Hudson	Historic house	One of the Historic Hudson Valley houses, early 19th-century estate
Moore Historical Museum		Waddington	St. Lawrence	Thousand Islands	Local history	website
Morehouse Historical Museum		Morehouse	Hamilton	Adirondack Region	Local history	website
Morrisville State College Wildlife Museum		Morrisville	Madison	Central Leatherstocking	Natural history	website, open by appointment
Motorcyclepedia		Newburgh	Orange	Mid-Hudson	Transportation	Over 500 motorcycles from 1897 onward
Mount Gulian		Fishkill	Dutchess	Mid-Hudson	Historic house	Reconstructed 18th-century Dutch manor house
Mount Lebanon Shaker Village		New Lebanon	Columbia	Capital District	Open air	Shaker village under restoration, includes walking tours and exhibits at Shaker Museum | Mount Lebanon
Mount Morris Dam		Mount Morris	Livingston	Finger Lakes	Natural history	William B. Hoyt II Visitor Center features a large atrium, museum and theater
Munson-Williams-Proctor Arts Institute Museum of Art		Utica	Oneida	Central Leatherstocking	Art	Arts center with museum featuring European and American art
Muscoot Farm		Somers	Westchester	Lower Hudson	Agriculture	Historic working dairy farm
Museum at Bethel Woods		Bethel	Sullivan	Mid-Hudson	Culture	History and culture of 1969 Woodstock Festival
Museum at the Creamery		Skaneateles	Onondaga	Central New York	Local history	website, operated by the Skaneateles Historical Society
Museum of Curiosities		Cazenovia	Madison	Central Leatherstocking	Natural history	website, part of the Cazenovia Public Library, artifacts relating to natural history, geology, ethnography, archaeology, historic relics, art and local history
The Museum of disABILITY History		Williamsville	Erie	Buffalo Niagara Region	Medical	History of people with disabilities from medieval times to the present era
Museum of the Earth		Ithaca	Tompkins	Finger Lakes	Natural history	Focuses on paleontology
Museum of Rhinebeck History		Rhinebeck	Dutchess	Mid-Hudson	Local history	website
Museum of the Early American Circus		Somers	Westchester	Lower Hudson	Multiple	Operated by the Somers Historical Society, local and area circus history
Museum of Wayne County History		Lyons	Wayne	Finger Lakes	Prison	website, operated by the Wayne County Historical Society, former county jail and sheriff's residence, also local history
Museum Village		Monroe	Orange	Mid-Hudson	Open air	website, 19th-century village
Napanoch Train Station Museum		Napanoch	Ulster	Mid-Hudson	Railroad	
Nash House Museum		Buffalo	Erie	Buffalo Niagara Region	Historic house	20th-century home of important leader of Buffalo's African-American community
Nathaniel Hill Brick House		Montgomery	Orange	Mid-Hudson	Historic house	18th-century estate of Nathaniel Hill
National Abolition Hall of Fame & Museum		Peterboro	Madison	Finger Lakes	History	History and important people of the anti-slavery movement in the United States, located in the Smithfield Presbyterian Church
National Baseball Hall of Fame and Museum		Cooperstown	Otsego	Central Leatherstocking	Sports	
National Bottle Museum		Ballston Spa	Saratoga	Adirondack Region	Industry - Bottle making	Antique glass bottles and tools
National Comedy Center		Jamestown	Chautauqua	Buffalo Niagara Region	Comedy	State of the art museum of comedy in Lucille Ball's hometown.
National Distance Running Hall of Fame		Utica	Oneida	Adirondack Region	Sports	
National Memorial Day Museum		Waterloo	Seneca	Finger Lakes	History	Memorabilia and history of the birth of Memorial Day
National Museum of Dance		Saratoga Springs	Saratoga	Capital District	Dance	
National Museum of Racing and Hall of Fame		Saratoga Springs	Saratoga	Capital District	Sports	
National Purple Heart Hall of Honor		New Windsor	Orange	Mid-Hudson	Military	
National Saint Kateri Tekakwitha Shrine		Fonda	Montgomery	Mohawk Valley	Native American	website, life of Kateri Tekakwitha, a Mohawk-Algonquian woman from New York and an early convert to Christianity and area Native American artifacts
National Shrine of the North American Martyrs		Auriesville	Montgomery	Mohawk Valley	Religious	Roman Catholic shrine dedicated to the Jesuit missionaries who were martyred at the Mohawk village of Ossernenon between 1642 and 1646
National Soaring Museum		Elmira	Chemung	Finger Lakes	Aviation	
National Toy Hall of Fame		Rochester	Monroe	Finger Lakes	Toy	Part of The Strong
National Warplane Museum		Geneseo	Livingston	Finger Lakes	Aviation	Aircraft of the World War II and Korean War eras
National Women's Hall of Fame		Seneca Falls	Seneca	Finger Lakes	History	
Native American Museum of Art		Tuscarora Reservation	Niagara	Buffalo Niagara Region	Native American	website, Native American art and culture, particularly Iroquois and Tuscarora
Nellis Tavern		St. Johnsville	Montgomery	Mohawk Valley	Historic house	Operated by the Palatine Settlement Society, restored 18th-century tavern
Ner-A-Car Motorcycle Museum		Syracuse	Onondaga	Central New York	Transportation	Motorcycles built in New York state
Neuberger Museum of Art		Purchase	Westchester	Lower Hudson	Art	contemporary art; part of Purchase College
Neversink Valley Museum of History and Innovation		Cuddebackville	Orange	Mid-Hudson	Canals	website, history of the Delaware & Hudson Canal
Newark-Arcadia Museum		Newark	Wayne	Finger Lakes	Local history	website, operated by the Newark-Arcadia Historical Society, also the 1876 Marbletown Schoolhouse
Newark Valley Depot and Museum		Newark Valley	Tioga	Finger Lakes	Railroad	website, operated by the Newark Valley Historical Society
New Windsor Cantonment State Historic Site		Vails Gate	Orange	Mid-Hudson	Military	Reconstruction of the final encampment of the Continental Army of the Revolutionary War
New Woodstock Regional Historical Society Museum		New Woodstock	Madison	Central Leatherstocking	Local history	website
New York Museum of Transportation		Rush	Monroe	Finger Lakes	Transportation	Historic vehicles and photographs, trolley rides, track car rides, model railroad displays
New York State Capitol		Albany	Albany	Capital District	History	
New York State Civilian Conservation Corps Museum		New Lisbon	Otsego	Capital District	History	Located in Gilbert Lake State Park, area activities of the Civilian Conservation Corps
New York State Country Music Hall of Fame		Cortland	Cortland	Finger Lakes	Music	website, located at the Cortland Country Music Park
New York State Executive Mansion		Albany	Albany	Capital District	Historic house	
New York State Grange Museum		Cortland	Cortland	Finger Lakes	History	website, history and artifacts of the New York State Grange
New York State Military Museum		Saratoga Springs	Saratoga	Capital District	Military	website, state's military history
New York State Museum		Albany	Albany	Capital District	Multiple	Art, artifacts (prehistoric and historic), and natural history artifacts that reflect New York State's cultural, natural, and geological development
New York State Wine Museum of Greyton H. Taylor		Hammondsport	Steuben	Finger Lakes	Multiple	Food and drink
Niagara Arts & Cultural Center		Niagara Falls	Niagara	Buffalo Niagara Region	Art	Includes two galleries
Niagara Falls Underground Railroad Heritage Center		Niagara Falls	Niagara	Buffalo Niagara Region	History	Museum about the Underground Railroad in Niagara Falls
Niagara Gorge Discovery Center		Niagara Falls	Niagara	Buffalo Niagara Region	Natural history	Natural and local history of Niagara Falls and the surrounding area, formerly the Schoellkopf Geological Museum
Niagara History Center		Lockport	Niagara	Buffalo Niagara Region	Open air	website, eight building museum complex showcasing early pioneer life, business and industry, includes the Col. William M. and Nancy Ralston Bond House, operated by the Niagara County Historical Society
Niagara Power Visitors Center		Lewiston	Niagara	Buffalo Niagara Region	Science	exhibits about water-powered electricity generation
Niagara Science Museum		Niagara Falls	Niagara	Buffalo Niagara Region	Science	Includes antique science instruments and philosophical apparatus
Niagara's Wax Museum of History		Niagara Falls	Niagara	Buffalo Niagara Region	Wax	website
North Creek Depot Museum		North Creek	Warren	Adirondack Region	Railroad	Area railroad history, place where Theodore Roosevelt learned of the assassination of President William McKinley and of his accession to the Presidency of the United States
Northeast Classic Car Museum		Norwich	Chenango	Central Leatherstocking	Automotive	Over 150 classic and antique cars
North Tonawanda History Museum		North Tonawanda	Niagara	Buffalo Niagara Region	Local history	website
Norfolk Historical Museum		Norfolk	St. Lawrence	Thousand Islands	Local history	website
Northup Carriage House Museum		Wolcott	Wayne	Finger Lakes	Local history	website, home of the Wolcott Historical Society and Museum
Northville & Northampton Historical Society Museum		Northville	Fulton	Adirondack Region	Local history	
Nunda Museum and Rose Shave Gallery		Nunda	Livingston	Finger Lakes	Local history	website, operated by the Nunda Historical Society
Oak Orchard Lighthouse Museum		Medina	Orleans	Buffalo Niagara Region	Maritime	Reconstructed 1909 lighthouse on Lake Ontario
Olana State Historic Site		Greenport	Columbia	Capital District	Historic house	Former estate of artist Frederic Edwin Church
Old Austerlitz Village		Austerlitz	Columbia	Capital District	Open air	website, operated by the Austerlitz Historical Society, early 19th-century village buildings
Old Fort House Museum		Fort Edward	Washington	Adirondack Region	Historic house	18th-century house depicting life from the 1770s through the 1940s
Old Fort Johnson		Amsterdam	Montgomery	Mohawk Valley	Historic house	18th-century house with exhibits about the social, cultural, military and industrial past of the Mohawk Valley
Old Fort Niagara State Historic Site		Youngstown	Niagara	Buffalo Niagara Region	Military	Part of Fort Niagara State Park, restored fort dating from the 17th century, costumed interpreters
Old Middlefield Schoolhouse Museum		Middlefield	Otsego	Central Leatherstocking	Local history	Operated by the Town of Middlefield Historical Association
Old Quaker Store Museum		Salamanca	Cattaraugus	Buffalo Niagara Region	Local history	History and development of Allegany State Park
Old Rhinebeck Aerodrome		Rhinebeck	Dutchess	Mid-Hudson	Aviation	Living museum of pre-World War II airplanes, automobiles and airplane engines
Old Stone Fort Museum Complex		Schoharie	Schoharie	Mohawk Valley	Open air	Includes an early 18th-century home, a 1780s Dutch barn, an 1830s law office, an 1890s one-room schoolhouse, and a 1772 stone church that was attacked during the American Revolution
Oliver Rice Homestead		Mayfield	Fulton	Adirondack Region	Historic house	1790 homestead with exhibits depicting local history including the glove industry
Omi International Arts Center		Ghent	Columbia	Capital District	Art	Features the Fields Sculpture Park and exhibitions in the Charles B. Benenson Visitors Center & Gallery
Oneida Community Mansion House		Oneida	Madison	Central Leatherstocking	Local history	History of the Oneida Community
Oneida County Historical Society		Utica	Oneida	Central Leatherstocking	Local history	website
Onondaga Historical Museum		Syracuse	Onondaga	Finger Lakes	Local history	website, exhibits include Syracuse China, The Magic Toy Shop, settlers, Native Americans, transportation, industry
Ontario County Historical Museum		Canandaigua	Ontario	Finger Lakes	Local history	website, operated by the Ontario County Historical Society
Opalka Gallery		Albany	Albany	Capital District	Art	website, part of Sage College of Albany
Opus 40		Saugerties	Ulster	Mid-Hudson	Art	Environmental sculpture park, also features the Quarryman's Museum, collection of antique tools
Orange County Farmer's Museum		Montgomery	Orange	Mid-Hudson	Agriculture	website, including farm tools, implements, equipment
Orange County Firefighters Museum		Montgomery	Orange	Mid-Hudson	Firefighting	website
Orangetown Historical Museum		Orangetown	Rockland	Lower Hudson	Local history	Located at two sites, the Edward Salyer House and the Peter DePew House; changing exhibits of local history and culture
Original American Kazoo Factory and Museum		Eden	Erie	Buffalo Niagara Region	Music	website, kazoo history and trivia
Oriskany Museum		Oriskany	Oneida	Capital District	Military	website, focuses on the Battle of Oriskany which took place in 1777, the village of Oriskany NY, and the aircraft carrier USS Oriskany
Ortlip Gallery		Houghton	Allegany	Buffalo Niagara Region	Art	website, part of Houghton University
Ossining Historical Society Museum		Ossining	Westchester	Lower Hudson	Local history	Open by appointment
Oswego Railroad Museum		Oswego	Oswego	Adirondack Region	Railroad	website
Our Lady of Victory Basilica		Lackawanna	Erie	Buffalo Niagara Region	Religious	Includes museum about founder Father Nelson Baker and the history of the basilica
Palatine House Museum		Schoharie	Schoharie	Capital District	Historic house	website, operated by the Schoharie Colonial Heritage Association, Colonial living museum
Palentown School House Museum		Accord	Ulster	Mid-Hudson	Education	One-room schoolhouse, open twice a year and by appointment
Palmyra Historic Museum		Palmyra	Wayne	Finger Lakes	Local history	website, operated by Historic Palmyra
Painted Post-Erwin Museum at the Depot		Painted Post	Steuben	Finger Lakes	Local history	Operated by the Corning-Painted Post Historical Society in a late 19th-century railroad depot
Parishville Museum		Parishville	St. Lawrence	Thousand Islands	Local history	website, features collection of hand-carved circus miniatures
Parker-O'Malley Air Museum		Ghent	Columbia	Capital District	Aviation	Open by appointment, located at the Columbia County Airport
Patriot Of Lake George		Lake George	Warren	Adirondack Region	Military	website, dedicated to the remembrance of veterans and service personnel of all branches
Peck's Lake Historical Society & Museum		Gloversville	Fulton	Adirondack Region	Education	1857 one-room schoolhouse and nature trail
Peekskill Museum		Peekskill	Westchester	Lower Hudson	Historic house	website
Pember Museum of Natural History		Granville	Washington	Adirondack Region	Natural history	website, mounted animals, rocks and minerals, fossils, dried plant specimens, adjacent nature preserve
Penfield Homestead Museum		Crown Point	Essex	Adirondack Region	Industry - Iron	History of the 19th-century ironworking industry in the North Country
Perrella Gallery		Johnstown	Fulton	Adirondack Region	Art	website, part of Fulton–Montgomery Community College
Perrysburg Historical Museum		Perrysburg	Cattaraugus	Buffalo Niagara Region	Local history	information, located in Town Hall
Peter Whitmer log home		Waterloo	Seneca	Finger Lakes	Historic house	Replica early 19th-century log home, important site in Latter Day Saint history
Phelps General Store		Palmyra	Wayne	Finger Lakes	History	website, operated by Historic Palmyra, example of the General Store when it was at its prime in 1890
Phelps Mansion		Binghamton	Broome	Central Leatherstocking	Historic house	Furnished Victorian mansion, art exhibits
Philipsburg Manor House		Sleepy Hollow	Westchester	Lower Hudson	Open air	Mid-18th-century period house, working water-powered grist mill and millpond, an 18th-century barn, a slave garden, and a reconstructed tenant farm house
Philipse Manor Hall State Historic Site		Yonkers	Westchester	Lower Hudson	Historic house	Museum of history, art and architecture since 1912
Picker Art Gallery		Hamilton	Madison	Central Leatherstocking	Art	Part of Colgate University, located in the Dana Arts Center
Pickering-Beach Historical Museum		Sackets Harbor	Jefferson	Thousand Islands	Historic house	Operated by the Sackets Harbor Historical Society in the Joshua Pickering House
Pines Museum		Slate Hill	Orange	Mid-Hudson	Historic house	
Pioneer Oil Museum		Bolivar	Allegany	Buffalo Niagara Region	Industry - Oil	website, area oil and gas industry
Pierrepont Museum		Pierrepont	St. Lawrence	Thousand Islands	Local history	
Plattsburgh State Art Museum		Plattsburgh	Clinton	Adirondack Region	Art	A museum without walls comprising several galleries, exhibition areas and a sculpture park at State University of New York at Plattsburgh
Potsdam Public Museum		Potsdam	St. Lawrence	Thousand Islands	Local history	website, local history, decorative arts
Pound Ridge Museum		Pound Ridge	Westchester	Lower Hudson	Local history	website, operated by the Pound Ridge Historical Society
Print Shop Museum		Palmyra	Wayne	Finger Lakes	Industry	website, operated by Historic Palmyra, historic printing equipment
Pratt House Museum		Fulton	Oswego	Central New York	Local history	1861 mansion with local history exhibits
Pulaski Historical Society Museum		Pulaski	Oswego	Thousand Islands	Local history	
Putnam History Museum		Cold Spring	Putnam	Lower Hudson	Local history	website, history of Putnam County, Philipstown, the West Point Foundry, and the Hudson Highlands
Putnam Valley Historical Society Museum		Putnam Valley	Putnam	Lower Hudson	Local history	website
Quincy Square Museum		Earlville	Madison	Central Leatherstocking	Local history	website
Railroad Museum of the Niagara Frontier		North Tonawanda	Niagara	Buffalo Niagara Region	Railroad	
Railway Historical Society of Northern New York		Croghan	Lewis	Adirondack Region	Railroad	website, depot museum with railway exhibits and trains
Regina A. Quick Center for the Arts (St. Bonaventure)		St. Bonaventure	Cattaraugus	Buffalo Niagara Region	Art	website, part of St. Bonaventure University
Remington Country Store and Museum		Ilion	Herkimer	Adirondack Region	Firearms	Remington Arms firearms from the early 19th century to the present
Rensselaer County Historical Society		Troy	Rensselaer	Capital District	Local history	Also operates Hart-Cluett Mansion as a historic house museum
Richard F. Brush Art Gallery		Canton	St. Lawrence	Thousand Islands	Art	website, part of St. Lawrence University
Richardson-Bates House		Oswego	Oswego	Adirondack Region	Historic house	Operated by the Oswego County Historical Society, late 19th-century period mansion, local history exhibits
Richburg-Wirt Historical Society Museum		Richburg	Allegany	Buffalo Niagara Region	Local history	information
Rich-Twinn Octagon House		Akron	Erie	Buffalo Niagara Region	Historic house	Mid-19th-century octagonal house, operated by the Newstead Historical Society
Ripley House Museum		Adams	Jefferson	Thousand Islands	Local history	Operated by the Historical Association of South Jefferson, 25-room house with local history displays
Rippleton Schoolhouse		Cazenovia	Madison	Central Leatherstocking	Education	Restored 1880s period one-room schoolhouse
River Lea		Grand Island	Erie	Buffalo Niagara Region	Historic house	Operated by the Grand Island Historical Society, located in Beaver Island State Park, Victorian summer home of Lewis F. Allen, the uncle of President Grover Cleveland
Roberson Museum and Science Center		Binghamton	Broome	Central Leatherstocking	Multiple	Local and natural history, science, art, planetarium
Robert Green Ingersoll Birthplace Museum		Dresden	Yates	Finger Lakes	Historic house	19th-century birthplace of noted agnostic and politician Robert G. Ingersoll
Robert H. Jackson Center		Jamestown	Chautauqua	Buffalo Niagara Region	Biographical	Life of Robert H. Jackson, Associate Justice of the Supreme Court of the United States from 1941 to 1954
Robert Jenkins House		Hudson	Columbia	Capital District	Historic house	website, operated by the Hendrick Hudson Chapter of the Daughters of the American Revolution
Robert Louis Stevenson Memorial Cottage and Museum		Saranac Lake	Essex	Adirondack Region	Historic house	
Robert M. Linsley Geology Museum		Hamilton	Madison	Central Leatherstocking	Natural history	website, part of Colgate University, minerals, rocks, fossils, state geology
Rochester & Genesee Valley Railroad Museum		West Henrietta	Monroe	Finger Lakes	Railroad	Accessed via a track car from the New York Museum of Transportation, houses over 40 pieces of railroad rolling stock
Rochester Contemporary Art Center		Rochester	Monroe	Finger Lakes	Art	Contemporary art
Rochester Medical Museum and Archives		Rochester	Monroe	Finger Lakes	Medical	website, corporate memory of the Rochester General Health System and includes the Baker-Cederberg Museum and Archives with exhibits on the history of medicine in Rochester, New York, the Genesee Hospital Archives and the archival records of other area hospitals
Rochester Museum and Science Center		Rochester	Monroe	Finger Lakes	Science	
Rockland Center for the Arts		West Nyack	Rockland	Lower Hudson	Art	Cultural center with exhibition gallery
Rockwell Museum		Corning	Steuben	Finger Lakes	Art	American and Native American art and artifacts
Roe Cobblestone Schoolhouse		Butler	Wayne	Finger Lakes	Education	Operated by the Butler Historical Society
Roeliff Jansen Historical Society Museum		Copake Falls	Columbia	Capital District	Local history	Located in a historic church building
Rogers Island Visitors Center		Fort Edward	Washington	Adirondack Region	History	website, history of Rogers Island, area prehistory, culture and military history up to the American Revolution
Roger Tory Peterson Institute of Natural History		Jamestown	Chautauqua	Buffalo Niagara Region	Natural history	website
Rome Historical Society Museum		Rome	Oneida	Central Leatherstocking	Local history	website
Rome Sports Hall of Fame and Museum		Rome	Oneida	Central Leatherstocking	Sports	website
Romulus Historical Society Museum		Romulus	Seneca	Finger Lakes	Local history	website
Roscoe Ontario & Western Railway Museum		Roscoe	Sullivan	Mid-Hudson	Railroad	website, information
Rose Hill Mansion		Fayette	Seneca	Finger Lakes	Historic house	Operated by the Geneva Historical Society, mid-19th-century mansion
Rough and Ready Firehouse Museum		Greenwich	Washington	Adirondack Region	Firefighting	Open May - August Saturdays 12-4 or by appointment. https://www.facebook.com/RandREngine
Roxbury Railroad Station Museum		Roxbury	Delaware	Central Leatherstocking	Railroad	
Rural Life Museum		King Ferry	Cayuga	Finger Lakes	Local history	website, operated by Genoa Historical Association, one-room schoolhouse, household, agriculture and rural life artifacts
Rushford Museum		Rushford	Allegany	Buffalo Niagara Region	Local history	information, operated by the Rushford Historical Society
Ruth and Elmer Wellin Museum of Art		Clinton	Oneida	Central Leatherstocking	Art	Part of Hamilton College, changing exhibits of art and photography
Ruth Howe-Prescott House		Franklinville	Cattaraugus	Buffalo Niagara Region	Historic house	website, information, open by appointment with the Ischua Valley Historical Society
Sackets Harbor Art Center		Sackets Harbor	Jefferson	Thousand Islands	Art	website, home of the Arts Association of Northern New York
Sackets Harbor Battlefield State Historic Site		Sackets Harbor	Jefferson	Thousand Islands	Military	War of 1812 military reenactments in the summer
Safe Haven Museum and Education Center		Oswego	Oswego	Adirondack Region	History	Stories of the 982 refugees from World War II who were allowed into the United States as "guests" of President Franklin D. Roosevelt, housed at Fort Ontario
Saint Marianne Cope Shrine and Museum		Syracuse	Onondaga	Central New York	Religious	website, shrine and museum with relics and exhibits about the life of Marianne Cope
Saint Paul's Church National Historic Site		Mount Vernon	Westchester	Lower Hudson	Religious	Includes museum of the American Revolution
Salamanca Historical Museum		Salamanca	Cattaraugus	Buffalo Niagara Region	Local history	Facebook site, information, operated by the Salamanca Historical Society
Salamanca Rail Museum		Salamanca	Cattaraugus	Buffalo Niagara Region	Railroad	information
Salmon River International Sport Fishing Museum		Altmar	Oswego	Adirondack Region	Sports	website, antique fishing rods, rare lures, reels and tackle
Salt Museum		Liverpool	Onondaga	Central New York	Industry - Salt	Located in Onondaga Lake Park, history of salt production in Syracuse
Salvation Army Heritage Museum		West Nyack	Rockland	Lower Hudson	Religious	Facebook site, mission and history of the Salvation Army
Sampson State Park Military Museum		Romulus	Seneca	Finger Lakes	Military	
Samuel Dorsky Museum of Art		New Paltz	Ulster	Mid-Hudson	Art	website, part of SUNY New Paltz, collections include American art with an emphasis on the Hudson Valley and Catskill Regions, 19th-, 20th- and 21st-century photography and metals
Sanborn Area Historical Society Farm Museum and Schoolhouse Museum		Sanborn	Niagara	Buffalo Niagara Region	Agriculture	website
Sands Ring Homestead Museum		Cornwall	Orange	Mid-Hudson	Historic house	Colonial era house
Santanoni Preserve		Newcomb	Essex	Adirondack Region	Historic house	Tours of the buildings of the former camp
Saranac Laboratory Museum		Saranac Lake	Franklin	Adirondack Region	Science	website, operated by Historic Saranac Lake, 1894 laboratory of Edward Livingston Trudeau
Saratoga Automobile Museum		Saratoga Springs	Saratoga	Capital District	Automotive	
Saratoga Harness Hall of Fame & Museum		Saratoga Springs	Saratoga	Capital District	Sports	Facebook site, harness museum with sulkies, racing silks, blacksmith works, horseshoes and metal sculptures
Saratoga National Historical Park		Saratoga Springs	Saratoga	Capital District	History	Preserves the site of the Battles of Saratoga, includes Schuyler House
Saratoga Springs History Museum		Saratoga Springs	Saratoga	Capital District	Local history	Located in the former Canfield Casino
Sardinia Historical Society Museum		Sardinia	Erie	Buffalo Niagara Region	Local history	
Saugerties Light		Saugerties	Ulster	Mid-Hudson	Lighthouse	
Schenectady County Historical Society Museum		Schenectady	Schenectady	Capital District	Local history	
Schenectady Museum		Schenectady	Schenectady	Capital District	Science	
Sci-Tech Center of Northern New York		Watertown	Jefferson	Thousand Islands	Science	website
Schoharie Crossing State Historic Site		Glen	Montgomery	Mohawk Valley	Canals	Visitor center and remains of an Erie Canal aqueduct
Schoharie Valley Railroad Museum		Schoharie	Schoharie	Mohawk Valley	Railroad	website, operated by the Schoharie Colonial Heritage Association
Schoolhouse No. 8 History Center & Museum		North Collins	Erie	Buffalo Niagara Region	Education	website, one-room rural schoolhouse
School of Pharmacy and Pharmaceutical Sciences Museum of the University at Buffalo		Buffalo	Erie	Buffalo Niagara Region	Medical	website, open by appointment, part of the School of Pharmacy at SUNY Buffalo, includes turn-of-the-20th-century apothecary, raw drugs, patent medicines, pharmacy artifacts
Schroeppel Historical Society Museum		Phoenix	Oswego	Thousand Islands	Local history	information
Schroon-North Hudson Historical Museum		Schroon Lake	Essex	Adirondack Region	Local history	website, operated by the Schroon-North Hudson Historical Society
Schuyler Mansion		Albany	Albany	Capital District	Historic house	18th-century period house, life of Philip Schuyler
Science Discovery Center of Oneonta		Oneonta	Otsego	Central Leatherstocking	Science	Part of State University of New York at Oneonta
Sciencenter		Ithaca	Tompkins	Finger Lakes	Science	Hands-on science exhibits
Seaway Trail Discovery Center		Sackets Harbor	Jefferson	Thousand Islands	Local history	Culture and heritage of the Great Lakes Seaway Trail and surrounding regions
Seneca Falls Historical Society Museum		Seneca Falls	Seneca	Finger Lakes	Historic house	website, late 19th-century Victorian period house
Seneca-Iroquois National Museum		Salamanca	Cattaraugus	Buffalo Niagara Region	Native American	website
Seneca Museum of Waterways and Industry		Seneca Falls	Seneca	Finger Lakes	Local history	website, area canals, industry
Senate House State Historic Site		Kingston	Ulster	Mid-Hudson	Local history	Site of the state's new government during the American Revolution, local history and art displays
Shacksboro Schoolhouse Museum		Baldwinsville	Onondaga	Finger Lakes	Local history	website, administered by McHarrie's Legacy
Shaker Museum | Mount Lebanon		New Lebanon	Columbia	Capital District	Religious	Located at Mount Lebanon Shaker Village, seasonal exhibitions of Shaker artifacts, and guided walking tours of the historic site
Shako:wi Cultural Center		Oneida	Madison	Central Leatherstocking	Native American	website, history and culture of the Oneida Nation
Sharon Museum Complex		Sharon	Schoharie	Mohawk Valley	Local history	Includes museum of local history, storage barn, one-room schoolhouse and three-room outhouse
Sherwood House		Yonkers	Westchester	Lower Hudson	Historic house	Maintained by the Yonkers Historical Society, 1740 farmhouse
Shushan Covered Bridge Museum		Shushan	Washington	Adirondack Region	Local history	Mid-19th-century covered bridge with period machinery and farm implements, adjacent one-room schoolhouse
Silas Wright House		Canton	St. Lawrence	Thousand Islands	Historic house	website, home to the St. Lawrence County Historical Association, mid-19th-century period house and local history exhibits
Singer Castle		Dark Island	St. Lawrence	Thousand Islands	Historic house	Late 19th-century castle house
Six Nations Indian Museum		Onchiota	Franklin	Adirondack Region	Native American	website
Skä•noñh - Great Law of Peace Center		Liverpool	Onondaga	Finger Lakes	Native American	website
Skene Manor		Whitehall	Washington	Adirondack Region	Historic house	19th century house
Skenesborough Museum		Whitehall	Washington	Adirondack Region	Local history	website
Slabsides		West Park	Ulster	Mid-Hudson	Historic house	Log cabin built by naturalist John Burroughs
Slate Valley Museum		Granville	Washington	Adirondack Region	Industry - Slate	website, shows how slate is formed and quarried
Smith Tavern		Armonk	Westchester	Lower Hudson	Local history	Operated by the North Castle Historical Society
Snyder Estate		Rosendale	Ulster	Mid-Hudson	Historic house	Operated by the Century House Historical Society, includes the Century House, Widow Jane Mine and Cement Industry Museum
Sodus Bay Lighthouse Museum		Sodus Point	Wayne	Finger Lakes	Lighthouse	Lighthouse, keeper's quarters and lighthouse artifacts
Sonnenberg Gardens & Mansion State Historic Park		Canandaigua	Ontario	Finger Lakes	Historic house	Nine formal gardens, 1887 Queen Anne-style mansion and greenhouse complex
Southeast Museum		Brewster	Putnam	Lower Hudson	Local history	website, located in the Old Southeast Town Hall
Spafford Area Historical Society		Spafford	Onondaga	Central New York	Local history	Operates the Spafford District #3 Side Hill School and the Grange Building by appointment
Sports Museum of Dutchess County		Wappingers Falls	Dutchess	Mid-Hudson	Sports	Located at Carnwath Farms Historic Site & Park
Springwater Webster Crossing Historical Society		Springwater	Livingston	Finger Lakes	Local history	website, museum open on a limited basis
Springville Center for the Arts		Springville	Erie	Buffalo Niagara Region	Art	Community multi-disciplinary arts center with gallery
Square House Museum		Rye	Westchester	Lower Hudson	Local history	website, operated by the Rye Historical Society, includes 18th-century period tavern rooms
St. Lawrence Power and Equipment Museum		Madrid	St. Lawrence	Thousand Islands	Agriculture	website, antique engines, tractors and related farm equipment
Staatsburgh State Historic Site		Staatsburg	Dutchess	Mid-Hudson	Historic house	Mansion designed by McKim, Mead, and White
Stafford Museum of History		Stafford	Genesee	Buffalo Niagara Region	Local history	website, operated by the Stafford Historical Society
Starr Clark Tin Shop & Underground Rail Road		Mexico	Oswego	Thousand Islands	History	Working tin shop that was the hub of the Abolitionist movement in Oswego County
Steepletop		Austerlitz	Columbia	Capital District	Historic house	Home of author Edna St. Vincent Millay
Stepping Stones		Katonah	Westchester	Lower Hudson	Historic house	Home of Alcoholics Anonymous co-founder Bill W. and his wife Lois Burnham Wilson, founder of Al-Anon/Alateen, open by appointment
Stickley Museum		Fayetteville	Onondaga	Finger Lakes	Decorative arts	website, Stickley furniture
Storm King Art Center		Mountainville	Orange	Mid-Hudson	Sculpture park	Outdoor sculpture park on 500 acres (2.0 km^{2})
Stone Arabia Schoolhouse Museum		Cicero	Onondaga	Central New York	Education	Operated by the Cicero Historical Society, one-room schoolhouse and nearby log cabin
Stone Mills Museum		Orleans	Jefferson	Thousand Islands	Agriculture	Maintained by the Northern New York Agricultural Historical Society, includes a sawmill, granary, school house, church, display buildings and farm machinery
Stone Quarry Hill Art Park		Cazenovia	Madison	Central Leatherstocking	Sculpture park	Outdoor art park on 108 acres (0.44 km^{2})
Stone-Tolan House Museum		Brighton	Monroe	Finger Lakes	Historic house	Operated by the Landmark Society, turn-of-the-19th-century house and tavern
Stony Point Battlefield State Historic Site		Stony Point	Rockland	Lower Hudson	Military	Revolutionary War site of the Battle of Stony Point
Stony Point Light		Stony Point	Rockland	Lower Hudson	Maritime	Located in Stony Point Battlefield State Historic Site, restored 19th-century lighthouse
The Strong		Rochester	Monroe	Finger Lakes	Children's	History of play and toys in American culture, includes The National Museum of Play, the National Toy Hall of Fame and the International Center for the History of Electronic Games
Strand Center for the Arts		Plattsburgh	Clinton	Adirondack Region	Art	Performing and visual arts center with a gallery
Suffern Railroad Museum		Suffern	Rockland	Lower Hudson	Railroad	
Suffern Village Museum		Suffern	Rockland	Lower Hudson	Local history	
Suggett House Museum		Cortland	Cortland	Finger Lakes	Local history	website, home of the Cortland County Historical Society
Sullivan County Museum		Hurleyville	Sullivan	Mid-Hudson	Local history	website, home of the Sullivan County Historical Society
Sunnyside		Tarrytown	Westchester	Lower Hudson	Historic house	Home of noted early American author Washington Irving
Sunshine Radio Museum		Sodus	Wayne	Finger Lakes	Technology	website, early years of the electronics industry starting from the turn of the 20th century up to the 1970s
Susan B. Anthony House		Rochester	Monroe	Finger Lakes	Historic house	Life and work of women's rights leader Susan B. Anthony
Susan C. Lyman Historical Museum		Norwood	St. Lawrence	Thousand Islands	Local history	website
Swart-Wilcox House		Oneonta	Otsego	Central Leatherstocking	Historic house	Operated by the Greater Oneonta Historical Society
Syracuse University Art Museum		Syracuse	Onondaga	Central New York	Art	website, several galleries at Syracuse University
Tabor-Wing House		Dover Plains	Dutchess	Mid-Hudson	Historic house	Restored early 19th-century house
Taconic State Park – Copake Falls area		Copake	Columbia	Capital District	Industry - Iron	Features the Iron Works Museum about the 19th-century iron works
Tang Teaching Museum		Saratoga Springs	Saratoga	Adirondack Region	Art	Part of Skidmore College, contemporary art
Tanglewood Nature Center & Museum		Elmira	Chemung	Finger Lakes	Natural history	website, live animals and natural history exhibits
TAUNY		Canton	St. Lawrence	Thousand Islands	Art	website, officially Traditional Arts in Upstate New York, exhibits of area folk culture and crafts
Tefft-Steadman House		Marcellus	Onondaga	Finger Lakes	Local history	Operated by the Marcellus Historical Society
Ten Broeck Mansion		Albany	Albany	Capital District	Historic house	Headquarters of the Albany County Historical Association, mid-19th-century period house
Ten Mile River Scout Museum		Narrowsburg	Sullivan	Mid-Hudson	Scouting	website, history and Scouting memorabilia of Ten Mile River Boy Scout Camp
Tennie Burton Museum		Lima	Livingston	Finger Lakes	Historic house	website, operated by the Lima Historical Society
Terra Cotta Museum		Alfred	Allegany	Buffalo Niagara Region	Art	Operated by the Alfred Historical Society
Terwilliger Museum		Waterloo	Seneca	Finger Lakes	Local history	Part of the Waterloo Library & Historical Society
Theodore Roosevelt Inaugural National Historic Site		Buffalo	Erie	Buffalo Niagara Region	Historic house	Turn-of-the-20th-century period rooms, site of the inauguration of President Theodore Roosevelt
Thomas Cole House		Catskill	Greene	Capital District	Historic house	
Thomas Paine Cottage		New Rochelle	Westchester	Lower Hudson	Historic house	Cottage of American Revolutionary War hero Thomas Paine, decorated in late 18th- to early 19th-century furnishings
Thomas Paine Memorial Museum		New Rochelle	Westchester	Lower Hudson	Biographical	Life of American Revolutionary War hero and author Thomas Paine
Thousand Islands Arts Center		Clayton	Jefferson	Thousand Islands	Textile	website, formerly The Handweaving Museum and Arts Center, features exhibits of textiles from its permanent textile collection and library, also crafts exhibits
Thousand Islands Museum		Clayton	Jefferson	Thousand Islands	Local history	website, includes decoy displays and the Muskie Hall of Fame
Town of Chester Museum of Local History		Chestertown	Warren	Adirondack Region	Local history	website
Throop Pharmacy Museum		Albany	Albany	Capital District	Medical	website, historic drug store reconstructed at Albany College of Pharmacy
Ticonderoga Heritage Museum		Ticonderoga	Essex	Adirondack Region	Local history	website, features over 38 scale models of various local industries
Ticonderoga Historical Society		Ticonderoga	Essex	Adirondack Region	Local history	website, non-profit organization organized in 1897 and chartered by the New York State Board of Regents in 1909; primary focus on the Adirondack Mountains and the Lakes Champlain and George regions
Time and the Valleys Museum		Grahamsville	Sullivan	Mid-Hudson	History	website 3 floors of fun interactive exhibits, small historic village/1930s themed Lost Catskill Farm. Connecting water, people, and the Catskills
Tinker Homestead and Farm Museum		Henrietta	Monroe	Finger Lakes	Historic house	Depicts farming life in the late 19th century
Tioga County Historical Society Museum		Owego	Tioga	Finger Lakes	Local history	website
Top Cottage		Hyde Park	Dutchess	Mid-Hudson	Historic house	Private retreat designed by and for Franklin D. Roosevelt
Town Line Museum		Johnstown	Fulton	Adirondack Region	History	Facebook site, 1950s diner display, memorabilia of the 1950s and 1960s
Town of Alabama Museum		Alabama	Genesee	Buffalo Niagara Region	Local history	website, information
Town of Hume Museum		Hume	Allegany	Buffalo Niagara Region	Local history	website
Town of Hyde Park Historical Society Museum		Hyde Park	Dutchess	Mid-Hudson	Local history	Located in a former firehouse
Town of Niagara District School No. 2		Niagara	Niagara	Buffalo Niagara Region	Education	One-room schoolhouse, operated by the Town of Niagara Historical Society
Town of Porter Historical Society Museum		Youngstown	Niagara	Buffalo Niagara Region	Local history	
Town of Shandaken Historical Museum		Pine Hill	Ulster	Mid-Hudson	Local history	
Trailside Museums and Zoo		Bear Mountain State Park	Rockland	Lower Hudson	Natural history	Located in Bear Mountain State Park, rehabilitated wildlife, area's natural history, history and Native American culture
Trailside Nature Museum		Cross River	Westchester	Lower Hudson	Natural history	website, located in Ward Pound Ridge Reservation
Trolley Museum of New York		Kingston	Ulster	Mid-Hudson	Transportation	Electric trolley cars
Ulysses Historical Society Museum		Trumansburg	Tompkins	Finger Lakes	Local history	website
University Art Museum at University at Albany		Albany	Albany	Capital District	Art	Contemporary art part of SUNY Albany
UB Art Galleries		Buffalo	Erie	Buffalo Niagara Region	Art	website, includes the UB Anderson Gallery and the UB Art Gallery at the Center for the Arts, part of University at Buffalo
Up Yonda Farm		Bolton Landing	Warren	Adirondack Region	Natural history	website, nature center with museum and trails
USS Slater		Albany	Albany	Capital District	Maritime	Cannon-class destroyer escort
Utica Children's Museum		Utica	Oneida	Adirondack Region	Children's	
Valentown Museum		Victor	Ontario	Finger Lakes	Local history	Operated by the Victor Historical Society
Van Cortlandt Manor		Croton-on-Hudson	Westchester	Lower Hudson	Historic house	18th-century manor house
Van Horn Mansion		Newfane	Niagara	Buffalo Niagara Region	Historic house	Turn-of-the-20th-century period mansion
Van Wyck Homestead Museum		Fishkill	Dutchess	Mid-Hudson	Historic house	Early 18th-century Dutch colonial house
Vanderbilt Mansion National Historic Site		Hyde Park	Dutchess	Mid-Hudson	Historic house	Late 19th-century mansion and estate
Vestal Museum		Vestal	Broome	Central Leatherstocking	Local history	website, local in the 1881 Vestal Train Station
Vintage Tracks Museum		Bloomfield	Ontario	Finger Lakes	Transportation	website, crawler tractors & memorabilia from the early 20th century
Walker House Museum		Madrid	St. Lawrence	Thousand Islands	Local history	website, operated by the Madrid Historical Society
Walter Elwood Museum		Amsterdam	Montgomery	Mohawk Valley	Multiple	Local history, Victorian, natural history, and items that relate to Mohawk Valley's industrial past
Walworth Historical Society Museum		Walworth	Wayne	Finger Lakes	Local history	website
Ward W. O'Hara Agricultural Museum		Auburn	Cayuga	Finger Lakes	Agriculture	website, handheld tools, farm equipment, carpenter and blacksmith shops, rural kitchen, bedroom, one-room school, country mercantile and dairy room
Warner Museum		Springville	Erie	Buffalo Niagara Region	Local history	website, operated by the Concord NY Historical Society, life and memorabilia of Pop Warner, dolls, tools, 1930s kitchen, items of local interest
War of 1812 Museum		Plattsburgh	Clinton	Adirondack Region	Military	History of the War of 1812 and the Battle of Plattsburgh
Warrensburgh Museum of Local History		Warrensburg	Warren	Adirondack Region	Local history	website, operated by the Warrensburgh Historical Society
Warwick Historical Society		Warwick	Orange	Mid-Hudson	Open air	website, complex of 7 historic buildings
Washington's Headquarters State Historic Site		Newburgh	Orange	Mid-Hudson	Historic house	18th-century home, site of longest-serving headquarters of George Washington during the American Revolutionary War
Washington County Fair Farm Museum		Greenwich	Washington	Adirondack Region	Agriculture	website, open seasonally, area crops, farm equipment, displays of tools and crafts, rural life artifacts
Waterford Historical Museum and Cultural Center		Waterford	Saratoga	Adirondack Region	Local history	website, located in the Hugh White Homestead
Waterman Conservation Education Center		Apalachin	Tioga	Finger Lakes	Natural history	website, environmental education center with museum about local wildlife
Watervliet Arsenal Museum		Watervliet	Albany	Capital District	Military	Displays on cannons and guns at the historic Iron Building
Watervliet Shaker Historic District		Colonie	Albany	Capital District	Religious	America's first Shaker settlement, museum and tours of the Watervliet Shaker Historic District
Wayland Historical Museum		Wayland	Steuben	Finger Lakes	Local history	website
Weaver Museum		Potsdam	St. Lawrence	Thousand Islands	Anthropology	website, part of SUNY Potsdam
Webster Museum and Historical Society		Webster (town), New York	Monroe	Finger Lakes	Local history	website, Local history, school tours
West Monroe Historical Society Museum		West Monroe	Oswego	Adirondack Region	Local history	Facebook site
West Point Museum		Highland Falls	Orange	Mid-Hudson	Military	website, history and tours of the United States Military Academy
Westchester County Veterans Museum		Somers	Westchester	Lower Hudson	Military	Located in Lasdon Park and Arboretum
Western New York Book Arts Center		Buffalo	Erie	Buffalo Niagara Region	Art	website, exhibits of the printed word and image
White Pine Camp		Paul Smiths	Franklin	Adirondack Region	Historic camp	Adirondack Great Camp open for tours
Wilcox Octagon House		Camillus	Onondaga	Finger Lakes	Historic house	
Wild Center		Tupper Lake	Franklin	Adirondack Region	Natural history	
Wilder Homestead		Malone	Franklin	Adirondack Region	Historic house	Boyhood home of Almanzo Wilder
Wilderstein		Rhinebeck	Dutchess	Mid-Hudson	Historic house	19th-century Queen Anne–style country house
Wildlife Sports and Educational Museum		Vail Mills	Fulton	Adirondack Region	Natural history	website, animal mounts, art, artifacts and memorabilia of hunting, fishing and all sports afield
William H. Seward House		Auburn	Cayuga	Finger Lakes	Historic house	19th-century period home of William H. Seward, exhibits about his life and family
William Pryor Letchworth Museum		Castile	Wyoming	Buffalo Niagara Region	Native American	Located in Letchworth State Park
Williamson-Pultneyville Historical Society		Pultneyville	Wayne	Finger Lakes	Local history	website, exhibits of local history
Wilson Historical Museum		Wilson	Niagara	Buffalo Niagara Region	Local history	website
Wilton Heritage Society Museum		Wilton	Saratoga	Adirondack Region	Local history	website
Wings of Eagles Discovery Center		Horseheads	Chemung	Finger Lakes	Aviation	website, collection of airplanes and helicopters
Woodstock Artists Association & Museum		Woodstock	Ulster	Mid-Hudson	Art	website, work in all media by area artists
Women's Rights National Historical Park		Seneca Falls	Seneca	Finger Lakes	History	
World Awareness Children's Museum		Glens Falls	Warren	Adirondack Region	Children's	website, cultural awareness museum for children
Yager Museum of Art & Culture		Oneonta	Otsego	Central Leatherstocking	Multiple	Part of Hartwick College, art, archaeology, Native American artifacts
Yates County History Center		Penn Yan	Yates	Finger Lakes	Local history	Operated by the Yates County Genealogical and Historical Society, includes the L. Caroline Underwood Museum, Oliver House Museum & Scherer Carriage House
Yorker Museum		Sinclairville	Chautauqua	Buffalo Niagara Region	Local history	Facebook site, reconstructed mini village with six restored buildings, depicting Sherman life in the mid-19th century
Yorktown Museum		Yorktown Heights	Westchester	Lower Hudson	History	website, features 18th-century Colonial rooms, farming, dolls and miniatures, railroad and Native American exhibits
Zadock Pratt Museum		Prattsville	Greene	Capital District	Historic house	19th-century period house
Zimmerman House		Horseheads	Chemung	Finger Lakes	Historic house	Open by appointment with the Horseheads Historical Society, late 19th-century home of political cartoonist Eugene Zimmerman

== Defunct museums ==
- Balmanno Cottage, Geneva, formerly operated by the Geneva Historical Society, closed in 2013
- Boswell Museum, Springfield Center, no longer any physical museum, just a website, preserves music of the 1920s and 1930s
- Bridgewater Auto Museum, Bridgewater, closed in 1989 after the death of Walt Meyer, its founder
- Campbell-Whittlesey House Museum, Rochester, closed in 2010
- Cudner-Hyatt House, Scarsdale, formerly operated by the Scarsdale Historical Society
- Deansboro Music Museum, Deansboro
- Dinosaur Walk Museum, Riverhead, closed in 2008, branches still exist in Branson, Missouri
- Goudreau Museum of Mathematics in Art and Science, New Hyde Park, closed in 2006
- Greenwood Museum
- Harwood's Grist Mill Farm, East Hartford
- Ithaca College Museum of Art
- Museum of Cartoon Art, Port Chester, became the National Cartoon Museum when the collection moved to Boca Raton, Florida in 1992
- Museum of Long Island Natural Sciences, formerly operated by Stony Brook University
- Museum of the Peaceful Arts
- National Soccer Hall of Fame and Museum, Oneonta, museum closed in 2010, inductions will continue
- New Netherland Museum, Albany, New York, maritime collections including the "Half Moon", a reproduction of the ship that Henry Hudson sailed from Holland to the New World in 1609
- Noteworthy Indian Museum, Amsterdam
- Pedaling History Bicycle Museum, Orchard Park, closed in 2009
- Professional Wrestling Hall of Fame and Museum, Amesterdam Move to Wichita Falls, TX in 2016
- Rail City Historical Museum, Sandy Creek, closed in 2015
- Retro Arcade Museum, Beacon, website
- Ticonderoga Cartoon Museum, Ticonderoga, closed in 2010
- Tired Iron Tractor Museum, Cuylerville, collection of vintage farm machinery, tractors, trucks, horse-drawn equipment, farm toys, sold in 2013, photos
- Toy Town Museum, East Aurora, closed in 2009

== Regions ==

The "Region" column in the sortable table can be used to help locate museums and understand which museums are in the same area. The list uses regions made up of the following counties or boroughs:

- Adirondack Region (counties all or partly in the Adirondack Park, except counties in the Capital District): Clinton, Essex, Franklin, Fulton, Hamilton, Herkimer, Lewis, Oneida, Saratoga, St. Lawrence, Warren, and Washington counties.
- Buffalo Niagara Region: Allegany, Cattaraugus, Chautauqua, Erie, Genesee, Niagara, Orleans, and Wyoming counties.
- Capital District: Albany, Schenectady, Rensselaer, Columbia, Greene and Saratoga counties.
- Central Leatherstocking: Broome, Delaware, Chenango, Madison, Montgomery, Otsego, Oswego, Schoharie counties.
- Finger Lakes: Onondaga County, Cortland County, Tioga County, Chemung County, Tompkins County, Cayuga County, Seneca County, Wayne County, Monroe County, Livingston County, Ontario County, Yates County, Schuyler County, and Steuben County.
- Lower Hudson: Putnam, Rockland, and Westchester counties.
- Long Island: Nassau and Suffolk counties.
- Mid-Hudson: Dutchess, Orange, Sullivan, and Ulster counties.
- New York City: Boroughs of Brooklyn, Bronx, Manhattan, Queens and Staten Island

== See also ==
- List of museums in New York City
- List of museums on Long Island for museums in Nassau and Suffolk counties
- List of university art museums and galleries in New York State
- List of nature centers in New York

== Defunct museums ==
- Balmanno Cottage, Geneva, formerly operated by the Geneva Historical Society, closed in 2013
- Boswell Museum, Springfield Center, no longer any physical museum, just a website, preserves music of the 1920s and 1930s
- Bridgewater Auto Museum, Bridgewater, closed in 1989 after the death of Walt Meyer, its founder
- Campbell-Whittlesey House Museum, Rochester, closed in 2010
- Cudner-Hyatt House, Scarsdale, formerly operated by the Scarsdale Historical Society
- Deansboro Music Museum, Deansboro
- Dinosaur Walk Museum, Riverhead, closed in 2008, branches still exist in Branson, Missouri
- Goudreau Museum of Mathematics in Art and Science, New Hyde Park, closed in 2006
- Greenwood Museum
- Harwood's Grist Mill Farm, East Hartford
- Ithaca College Museum of Art
- Museum of Cartoon Art, Port Chester, became the National Cartoon Museum when the collection moved to Boca Raton, Florida in 1992
- Museum of Long Island Natural Sciences, formerly operated by Stony Brook University
- Museum of the Peaceful Arts
- National Soccer Hall of Fame and Museum, Oneonta, museum closed in 2010, inductions will continue
- Noteworthy Indian Museum, Amsterdam
- Pedaling History Bicycle Museum, Orchard Park, closed in 2009
- Professional Wrestling Hall of Fame and Museum, Amesterdamn Move to Wichita Falls, TX in 2015
- Rail City Historical Museum, Sandy Creek, closed in 2015
- Retro Arcade Museum, Beacon, website
- Ticonderoga Cartoon Museum, Ticonderoga, closed in 2010
- Tired Iron Tractor Museum, Cuylerville, collection of vintage farm machinery, tractors, trucks, horse-drawn equipment, farm toys, sold in 2013, photos
- Toy Town Museum, East Aurora, closed in 2009

== Regions ==

The "Region" column in the sortable table can be used to help locate museums and understand which museums are in the same area. The list uses regions made up of the following counties or boroughs:

- Adirondack Region (counties all or partly in the Adirondack Park, except counties in the Capital District): Clinton, Essex, Franklin, Fulton, Hamilton, Herkimer, Lewis, Oneida, Saratoga, St. Lawrence, Warren, and Washington counties.
- Buffalo Niagara Region: Allegany, Cattaraugus, Chautauqua, Erie, Genesee, Niagara, Orleans, and Wyoming counties.
- Capital District: Albany, Schenectady, Rensselaer, Columbia, Greene and Saratoga counties.
- Central Leatherstocking: Broome, Delaware, Chenango, Madison, Montgomery, Otsego, Oswego, Schoharie counties.
- Finger Lakes: Onondaga County, Cortland County, Tioga County, Chemung County, Tompkins County, Cayuga County, Seneca County, Wayne County, Monroe County, Livingston County, Ontario County, Yates County, Schuyler County, and Steuben County.
- Lower Hudson: Putnam, Rockland, and Westchester counties.
- Long Island: Nassau and Suffolk counties.
- Mid-Hudson: Dutchess, Orange, Sullivan, and Ulster counties.
- New York City: Boroughs of Brooklyn, Bronx, Manhattan, Queens and Staten Island

== See also ==
- List of museums in New York City
- List of museums on Long Island for museums in Nassau and Suffolk counties
- List of university art museums and galleries in New York State
- List of historical societies in New York (state)
- List of nature centers in New York
