= Children's Museum of Science and Technology =

The Children's Museum of Science and Technology
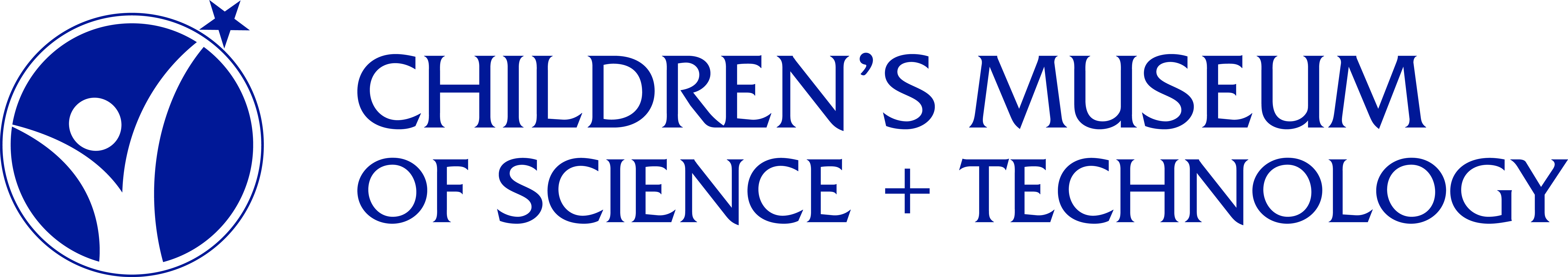

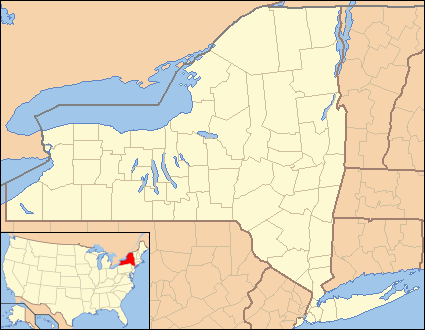
- Location within New York
- Former name: The Junior Museum
- Established: 1954
- Dissolved: March 2020
- Location: Troy, New York
- Coordinates: 42.676786°N 73.697677°W
- Type: Children's museum

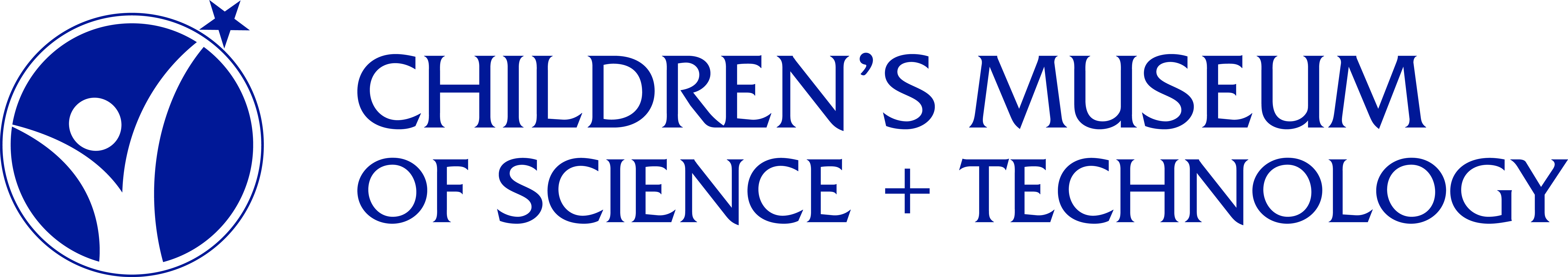
CMOST 288

The Children's Museum of Science and Technology (CMOST) was a science museum for children in Troy, New York. The museum had various exhibits, including almost 100 living animals. The museum did not admit adults unless accompanied by children.

== History ==
The museum opened as The Junior Museum in 1954, a museum containing hands-on exhibits for children housed in the basement of the Rensselaer Historical Society. The museum relocated three times until it finally moved to the Rensselaer Technology Park and re-branded as the Children's Museum of Science and Technology. The Museum permanently closed at the RPI Tech Park location at 250 Jordan Road in March 2020 as a result of the pandemic. In 2022 CMOST merged with the Children's Museum at Saratoga, who took on the management of CMOST's outreach education programs.

== See also ==
- Rensselaer Technology Park
- List of museums in New York
