= Toy Town Museum =

Toy museum in East Aurora, New York

Coordinates: 42.772442°N 78.612519°W

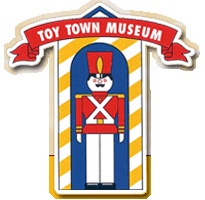
- Established: 1987
- Location: Fisher-Price Campus (636 Girard Avenue, East Aurora, New York
- Visitors: Thousands/yr
- Director: Gary Grote
- Website: www.toytownusa.com

The Toy Town Museum is located on the Fisher-Price campus in East Aurora, New York. It was conceived by a group of local citizens in East Aurora and Western New York to help celebrate the toy making heritage in the area. There have been over 100 toy companies throughout Western New York over the past 100 years and the museum's exhibitions attempt to educate and entertain visitors.

As of May 2009, the museum is no longer open to the public or located on the Fisher-Price campus, but is seeking a new location.

== Special exhibitions (Permanent) ==
The Fisher-Price Archive Collection - This collection chronicles the history of the toy company from its beginning in 1931 to present.

Savings Bank Collection - A private collection of promotional savings banks.

Miniature Herschell Carousel - A handmade reproduction of an Allan Herschell Company carousel.

Carousel Horses - Two beautifully restored carousel horses from the early 1900s.

The Brownies - A collection of small elf-like little creatures created by Palmer Cox in the late 1800s based on a Scottish folktale.

The Jane Kelsey Doll House - A fully furnished 12 room doll house.

Erector Set Display - A working display of one of the most popular building toys of all time.

A Pez Collection - The popularity of the candy was surpassed by its packaging as shown through this collection of Pez dispensers.

Our Junior Collector Case - A testament that anyone one can be a collector and highlighting our young collectors of today.

== See also ==
- Explore & More Children's Museum
