= Strand Theater (Plattsburgh, New York) =

- U.S. National Register of Historic Places
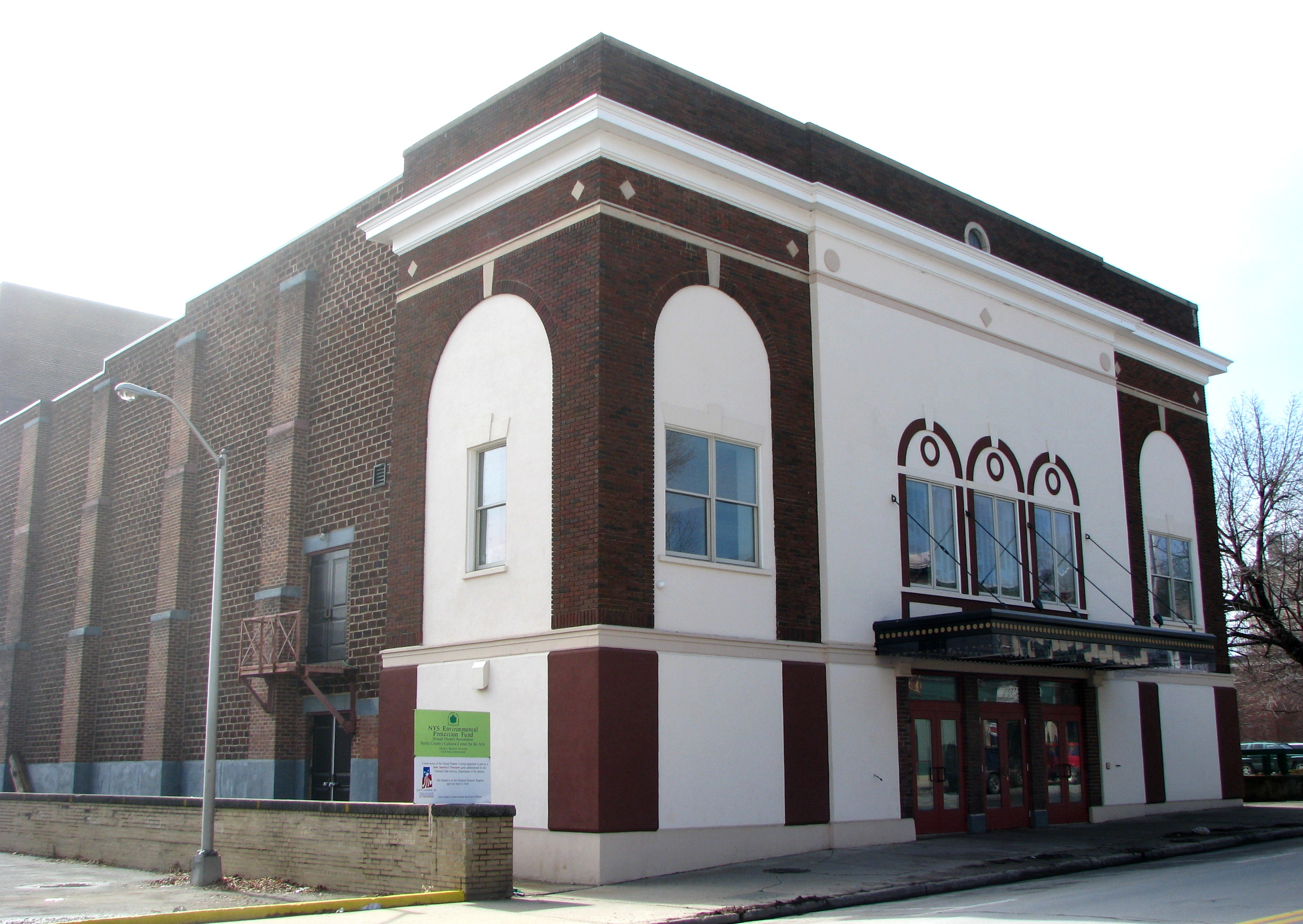
- Strand Theater, March 2012

- Location within New York Location within the United States
- Location: 25 Brinkerhoff St., Plattsburgh, New York
- Coordinates: 44°41′49″N 73°27′17″W
- Area: less than one acre
- Built: 1924
- Architect: Vaughan, William H.
- Architectural style: Classical Revival
- NRHP reference No.: 08000922
- Added to NRHP: September 15, 2008

Strand Theater, now called the Strand Center Theatre, is a historic theater located at Plattsburgh in Clinton County, New York. It was built in 1924 as the premier theater in Plattsburgh and designed in the Classical Revival style. It consists of a vestibule, main lobby, mezzanine, auditorium, and stage with supporting spaces. It has seating for 950 people.

It was in continuous use as a movie theater until 2005, when it was purchased by the North Country Cultural Center for the Arts (NCCCA) with the goal of restoring it to its historic grandeur. This restoration took 10 years and $4 million to complete. In 2014 the NCCCA changed its legal name to The Strand Center for the Arts which includes this beautiful Strand Center Theatre but also the Federal Building next door which houses administration, gallery space and arts education classes.

It was listed on the National Register of Historic Places in 2008.
