= Lake Pleasant Town Hall =

- U.S. National Register of Historic Places
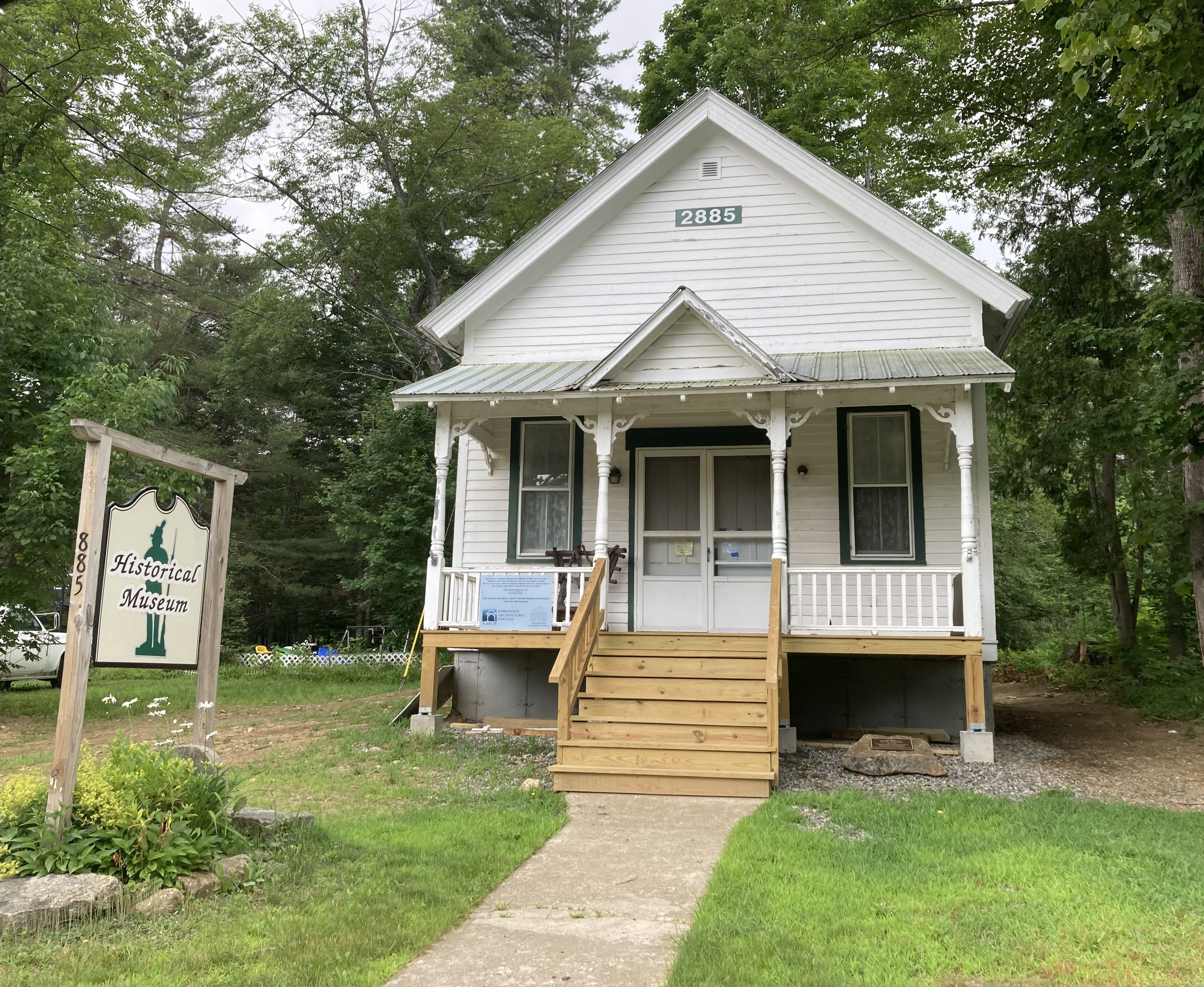

- Location within New York Location within the United States
- Location: 2885 NY 8, Speculator, New York
- Coordinates: 43°30′2″N 74°21′56″W
- Area: 0.9 acres (0.36 ha)
- Built: 1894
- NRHP reference No.: 09000238
- Added to NRHP: April 23, 2009

Lake Pleasant Town Hall is a historic town hall located at Speculator in Lake Pleasant, Hamilton County, New York. It was built in 1894 and is a simple 1 1/2-story, three-by-three-bay, front-gabled, clapboard-sided building. It was used as town hall and library until 1961, when the town offices moved to new quarters. The library remained until 2003 and it is now used as a local history museum.

It was added to the National Register of Historic Places in 2009.
