= Railroad Museum of the Niagara Frontier =

American museum

Coordinates: 43.026112°N 78.873418°W

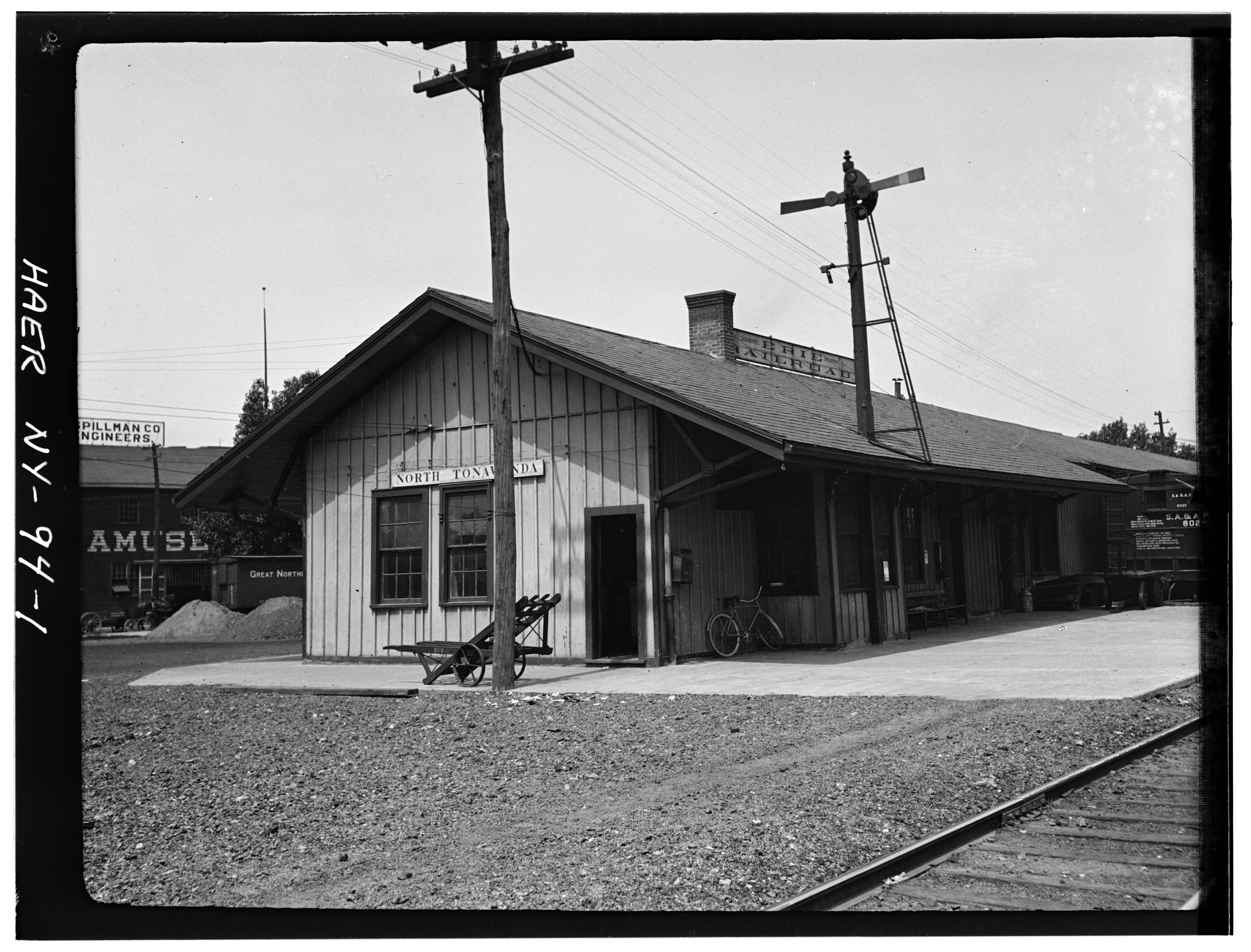
The former Erie Railroad station near the headquarters of the museum.

The Railroad Museum of the Niagara Frontier is located in the 1922-built Erie Railroad freight depot in North Tonawanda, New York. Operated by the Niagara Frontier Chapter of the National Railroad Historical Society, its mission is to preserve the railroad history of the Buffalo, New York area, once the railroad hub of America. The Museum is owned by the Niagara Frontier Chapter of the National Railway Historical Society.

== History ==
The museum was opened after members restored the depot on June 1, 2003. The ribbon cutting ceremonies included a speech from George Maziarz.

== Exhibits ==
The Railroad Museum of the Niagara Frontier owns several small artifacts and four pieces of railway equipment. They include two bay-window cabooses, one of Erie ancestry and the other from the New York Central. The Museum's locomotives include a gasoline-powered Plymouth 20-Tonner and a Whitcomb 50-Ton Diesel-Hydraulic centercab switcher built by the Canadian Locomotive Company in Kingston, Ontario. This locomotive was formerly owned by the Tonawanda Island Railroad (TILR). Across the street from the station is an old New York Central interlocking tower called EL-2. Future plans are to restore the tower and integrate it into the museum.
