= Pedaling History Bicycle Museum =

Museum in New York State, US

Pedaling History Bicycle Museum was a privately funded museum in Orchard Park, New York in Erie County that was dedicated to the history of pedal bicycles and bicycling in America, and containing an extensive collection of vintage and antique bicycles and cycling memorabilia. More than 400 rare and unique bicycles were on display, making it one of the largest bicycle museums in the world. Displays also showed examples of innovations that were initially designed for bicycles but which were later applied to automobiles, such as the first differential drive system and the first rack and pinion steering system. The exhibits had been collected over many years by the museum's founders, Carl Burgwardt and his wife Clarice.

The museum closed in November 2009 and the collection was subsequently dispersed, being sold in a series of auctions that took place in 2012 and 2013. Some of the collection items were purchased by the Houston Bicycle Museum.
