= Caleb Hyatt House =

Historic house in New York, United States

- U.S. National Register of Historic Places
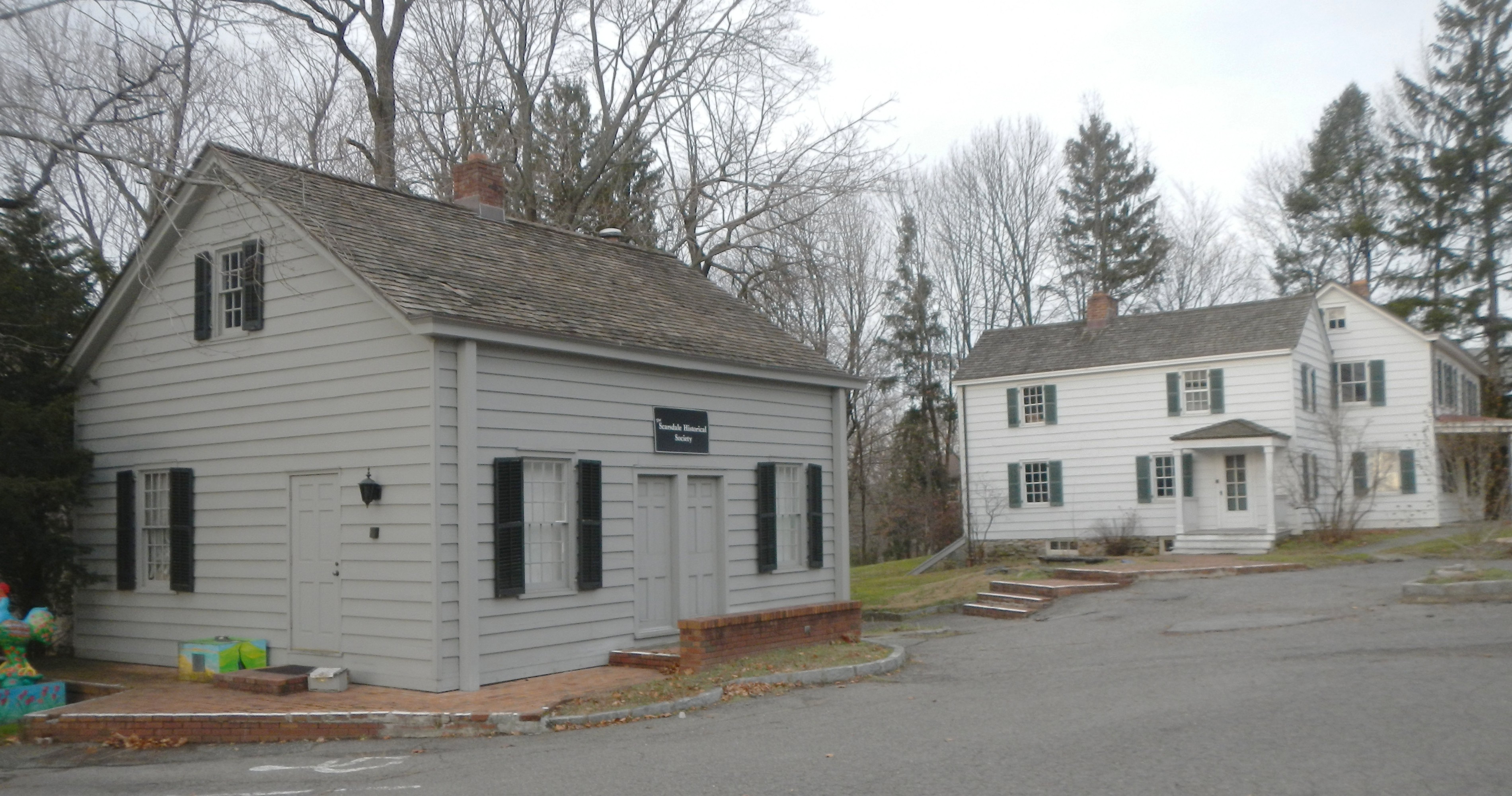
- Shop (left) and house (right)

- Location within New York Location within the United States
- Location: 937 White Plains Post Rd., Scarsdale, New York
- Coordinates: 40°58′54″N 73°48′0″W
- Area: less than one acre
- Built: 1734–1754
- NRHP reference No.: 73001291
- Added to NRHP: January 22, 1973

The Caleb Hyatt House (also known as the Cudner-Hyatt House) is a historic house located at 937 White Plains Post Road in Scarsdale, Westchester County, New York.

== Description and history ==
It consists of two adjoining structures. The original building was built between 1734 and 1754 and raised to two stories about 1836. It is a wood-framed building, two bays by one bay, on a stone foundation and sheathed in clapboard. The second structure was built prior to 1830. It is a 2 1/2-story, five-by-two-bay, wood-framed building sheathed in clapboard. Also on the property is a small dependency believed to have been a "shoe shop".

It was added to the National Register of Historic Places on January 22, 1973.

== See also ==
- National Register of Historic Places listings in southern Westchester County, New York
