= Town of Niagara District School No. 2 =

- U.S. National Register of Historic Places
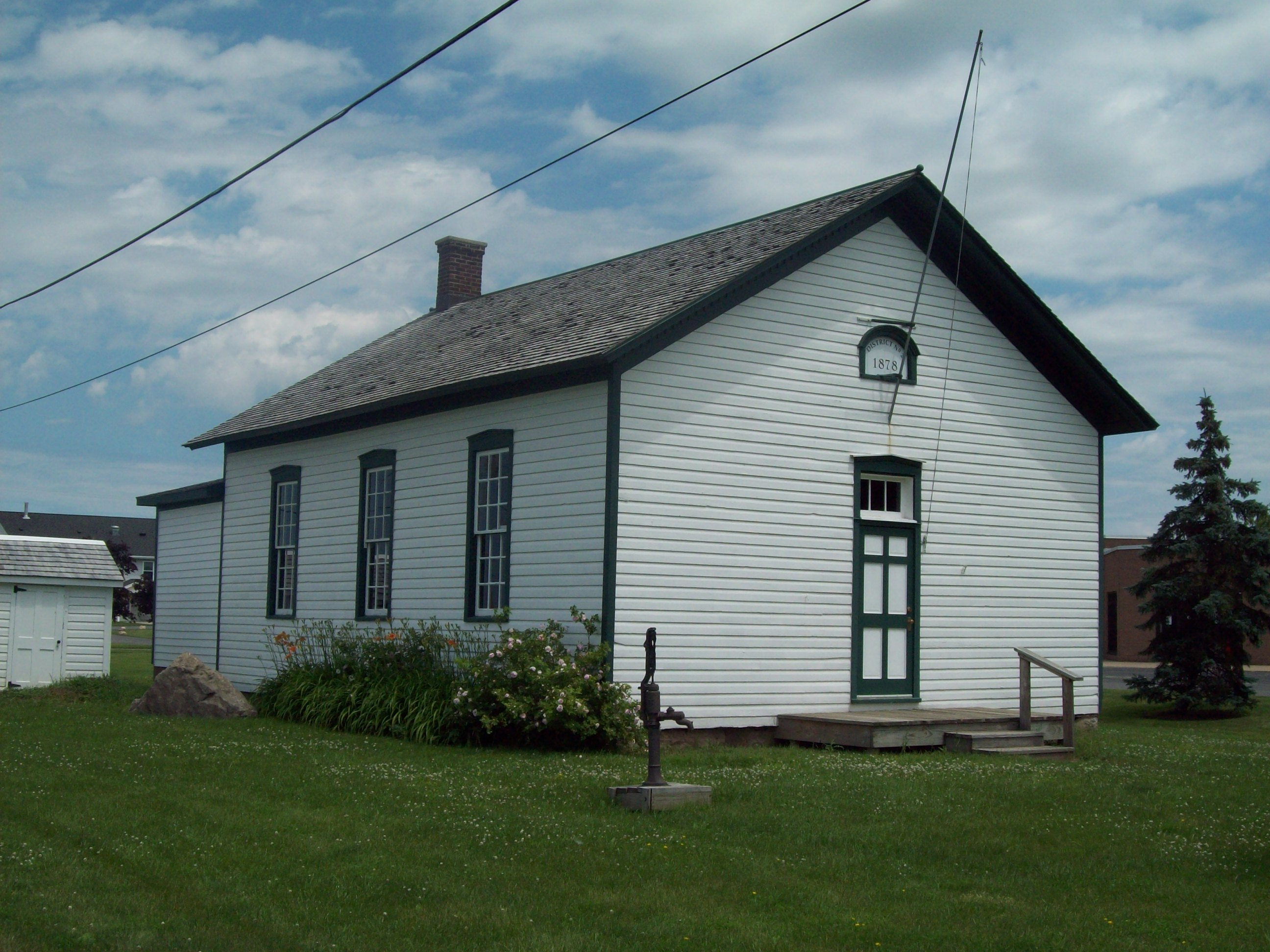
- Town of Niagara District School No. 2, June 2009

- Location within New York Location within the United States
- Nearest city: Niagara Falls, New York
- Coordinates: 43°7′18″N 78°57′3″W
- Built: 1878
- Architect: Jacob Wagner, Jacob Reese
- Architectural style: Late 19th And 20th Century Revivals
- NRHP reference No.: 05000021
- Added to NRHP: February 9, 2005

Town of Niagara District School No. 2 is a historic One-room school located at Niagara in Niagara County, New York. It is a one-story frame structure built in 1878. It operated as a school until 1954, then a school book depository. In 1980, it became home to the Town of Niagara Historical Society.

It was listed on the National Register of Historic Places in 2005.
