= 1812 Homestead Farm and Museum =

Historic house in Willsboro, New York

Coordinates: 44.383111°N 73.438647°W

- Location: Willsboro, New York, United States
- Website: 1812 Homestead Educational Foundation

The 1812 Homestead Farm and Museum, sometimes known as the 1812 Homestead or the 1812 Homestead Inn, is a historic house located near long pond in Willsboro, New York, occupying 130acres that currently operates as a living history museum.

Originally constructed in 1813 as an inn, the homestead now offers tours and programming allowing the visitors to experience what life was like at that time and educates visitors on 19th-century heritage. The old barn got burnt in August 2016, and a new one got built in 2017. It is also the current home of the Burt School, which was originally located in Essex.
