= Swart-Wilcox House =

Historic house in New York, United States

- U.S. National Register of Historic Places
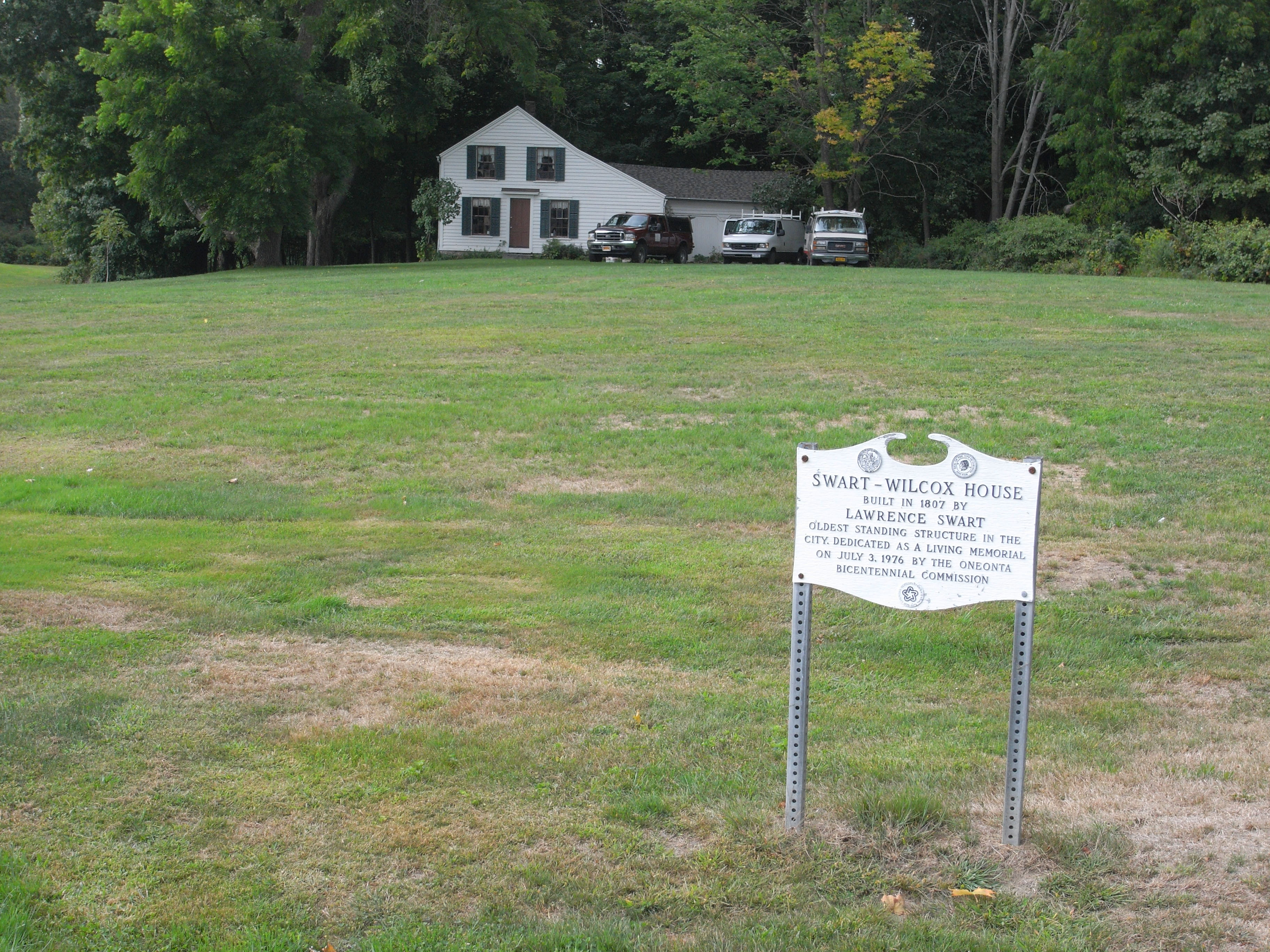
- Swart-Wilcox House, September 2012

- Location within New York Location within the United States
- Location: Jct. of Wilcox Ave. and Henry St., Oneonta, New York
- Coordinates: 42°26′38″N 75°4′15″W
- Area: 14.4 acres (5.8 ha)
- Built: 1807
- NRHP reference No.: 90000817
- Added to NRHP: May 24, 1990

Swart-Wilcox House is a historic home located at Oneonta in Otsego County, New York. It is a German Palatine Vernacular settlement period house built about 1807. It is a 1 1/2-story, wood-frame house with a gable roof and clapboard siding. Attached to the house is a shed and carriage shed. In 1972 the City of Oneonta purchased the deteriorating house. It is operated as a community educational resource and historic house museum.

It was listed on the National Register of Historic Places in 1990.
