= Goudreau Museum of Mathematics in Art and Science =

Museum in New York, United States

- Established: 1980
- Dissolved: 2006
- Location: Herricks Community Center; 999 Herricks Road; New Hyde Park, New York, United States
- Directors: Beth Deaner (ca. 2000-2004); Tom Lucas (2004-2006)

The Goudreau Museum of Mathematics in Art and Science was a museum of mathematics that was open from 1980 to 2006 in Long Island, New York. The museum was named after mathematics teacher Bernhard Goudreau, who died in 1985, and featured many of the 3-dimensional solid models, oversized wooden math games, and puzzles built by Goudreau and his former students. After the museum closed, former math professor Glen Whitney opened the Museum of Mathematics in Manhattan in December 2012.
