= Joseph Horton House =

Historic house in New York, United States

- U.S. National Register of Historic Places
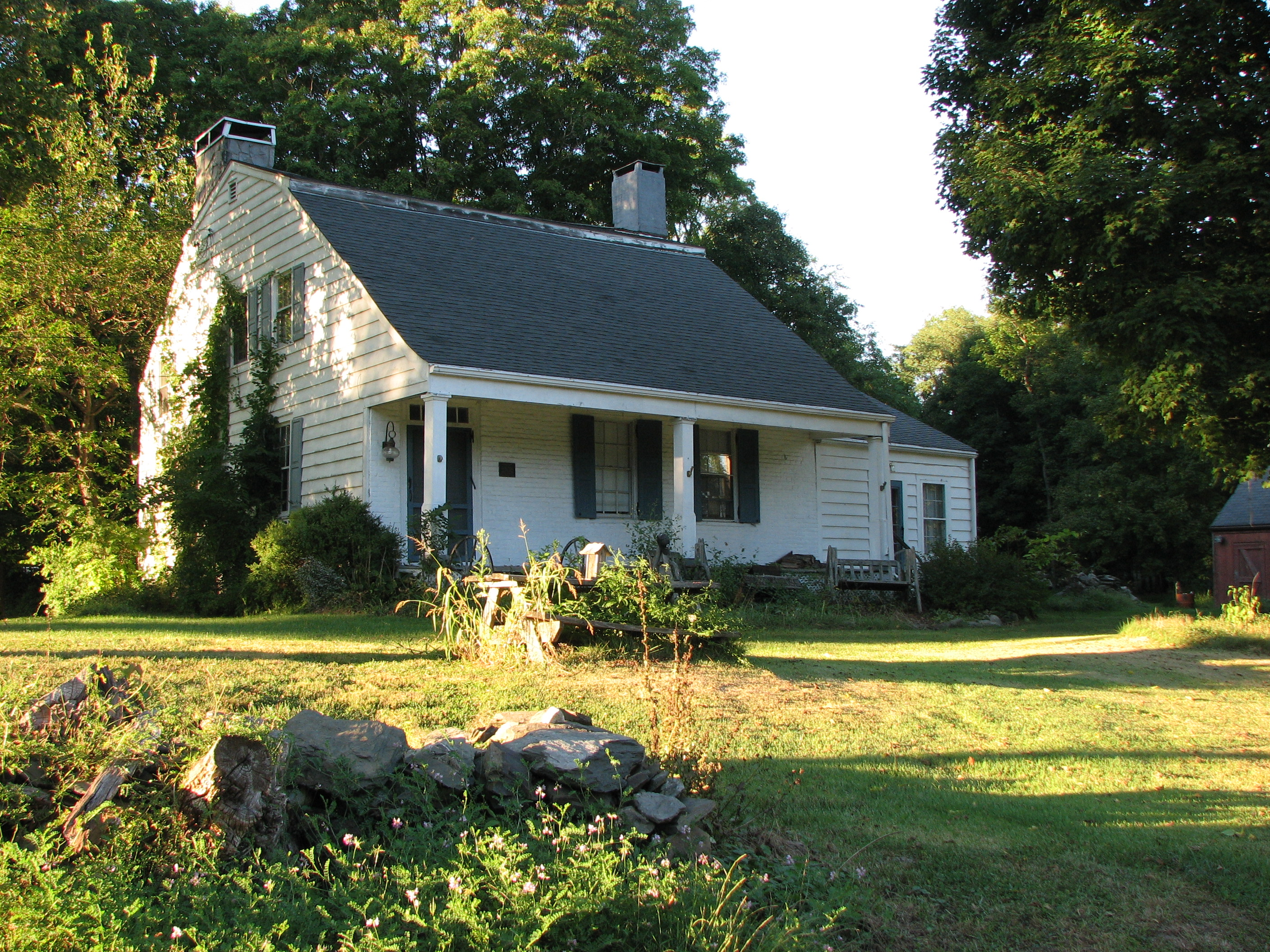
- South (front) elevation and west profile, 2014

- Location within New York Location within the United States
- Location: NY 376, New Hackensack Rd., New Hackensack, New York
- Coordinates: 41°37′23″N 73°52′19″W
- Area: 2 acres (0.81 ha)
- Built: 1725–1752
- Architectural style: Colonial, Dutch Colonial
- NRHP reference No.: 88000916
- Added to NRHP: November 2, 1988

The Joseph Horton House is an historic structure located in New Hackensack, New York. Once part of a larger 250-acre (100 ha) farm, the farmhouse was built between 1725 and 1752. In 1840, the farm was divided, leaving the house on a 100-acre (40 ha) parcel, and it became known as "Old Hundred". Only a 2 acres (0.81 ha) lot remains intact. It was listed on the National Register of Historic Places on November 2, 1988. The building is located on the north side of NY 376, or New Hackensack Road.

The house is privately owned, but has been restored and is open for tours by appointment.
