= Moser Farm =

- U.S. National Register of Historic Places
- Location within New York Location within the United States
- Location: 8778 Erie Canal Rd., Kirschnerville, New York
- Coordinates: 43°53′32″N 75°20′6″W
- Area: 68.3 acres (27.6 ha)
- Built: 1845
- NRHP reference No.: 10000516
- Added to NRHP: July 30, 2010

Moser Farm, also known as The Mennonite Heritage Farm or Adirondack Mennonite Heritage Farm, is a historic farm complex located near Kirschnerville in Lewis County, New York. The complex consists of Moser family dwelling and a compact grouping of a granary and two English barns. The frame dwelling was built in 1845 and consists of a 2-story, three-bay block and four-bay, 1 1/2-story ell. It was used for Mennonite worship services in the 19th century. The granary dates to the mid- to late 19th century, and the barns date to 1874. The property was purchased in the 1980s as a living history museum.

It was listed on the National Register of Historic Places in 2010.
