= List of university art museums and galleries in New York State =

This is a list of university art museums and galleries in New York (state).

University or College	Public/Private/Statutory	City	County	Museums	Accreditation	Galleries
Adelphi University	Private	Garden City	Nassau			Performing Arts Gallery, Ruth S. Harley University Center Gallery, Swirbul Library, Manhattan Center Galleries
Alfred University	Statutory College	Alfred	Allegany	Alfred Ceramic Art Museum		Fosdick-Nelson Gallery, website, Robert C. Turner Gallery Cohen Center for The Arts Gallery, Interactive Media Black Box Student exhibition spaces: The Cube, Cell Space, The Box, Printmaking Critique Room, John Woods Studios Smart Wall and Interactive Media Cube, Painting Hallway Hanging Space, Flex Space, The New Deal, Rhodes Room Affiliated Galleries: Hornell Center for the Arts Gallery, The Post Office, The Belfry Legacy of Student Exhibition Spaces: Turner II-V, No Shoes Gallery, Random Room
Alfred State SUNY College of Technology	Public	Alfred	Allegany			Llewellyn Gallery website Hinkle Memorial Library Gallery
Bard College	Private	Annandale-on-Hudson	Dutchess	Hessel Museum of Art		CCS Bard Galleries
Barnard College	Private	New York City	Manhattan			Gallery in the Diana Center
Baruch College	Public	New York City	Manhattan			Mishkin Gallery
Berkeley College	For profit	New York City	Manhattan			Berkeley College Art Gallery
Binghamton University	Public	Binghamton	Broome	Binghamton University Art Museum		Elsie B. Rosefsky Memorial Art Gallery
Buffalo State University	Public	Buffalo	Erie	Burchfield-Penney Art Center	AAM Accredited	Czurles-Nelson Gallery
Canisius University	Private	Buffalo	Erie			Peter A and Mary Lou Vogt Gallery
Cayuga Community College	Public	Auburn	Cayuga			Library Gallery @ 197
City College	Public	New York City	Manhattan			CUNY Art Department Gallery CUNY Dominican Studies Institute Gallery
Clinton Community College	Public	Plattsburgh	Clinton			CCC Alumni Art Gallery
Colgate University	Private	Hamilton	Madison			Picker Art Gallery, Clifford Gallery
College of New Rochelle	Private	New Rochelle	Westchester			Castle Gallery at the College of New Rochelle
College of St. Rose	Private	Albany	Albany			Esther Massry Gallery
College of Staten Island	Public	New York City	Staten Island			The Art Gallery at the College of Staten Island
Columbia-Greene Community College	Public	Hudson	Columbia			Foundation Art Gallery in the Arts Center
Columbia University	Private	New York City	Manhattan			Wallach Art Gallery Leroy Neiman Gallery, website
Cooper Union	Public	New York City	Manhattan			41 Cooper Art Gallery, Herb Lubalin Gallery, Arthur A. Haughton Jr. Gallery
Cornell University	Statutory College	Ithaca	Tompkins	Herbert F. Johnson Museum of Art, Rose Goldsen Archive of New Media Art	AAM Accredited, AAMG Member	Willard Straight Hall Art Gallery, Economics:ART GALLERY
Cornell University College of Human Ecology	Private	Ithaca	Tompkins			Jill Stuart Gallery
Corning Community College	Public	Corning	Steuben			Arium Gallery
Daemen University	Private	Amherst	Erie			Tower Gallery in the Haberman Gacioch Center for the Visual and Performing Arts, also known as VPAC Art Gallery
Dutchess Community College	Public	Poughkeepsie	Dutchess			Mildred I. Washington Art Gallery
Elmira College	Private	Elmira	Chemung			George Waters Art Gallery, Campus Center
Empire State University	Public	Saratoga Springs	Saratoga			Central Arts Gallery in East Syracuse Livingston Gallery in Brooklyn, Hudson Gallery in Manhattan Crystal Scriber Gallery in Utica
Farmingdale State College	Public	East Farmingdale	Suffolk			Memorial Gallery
Fashion Institute of Technology	Public	New York City	Manhattan	The Museum at the Fashion Institute of Technology		
Finger Lakes Community College	Public	Canandaigua	Ontario			Williams-Insalaco Gallery
Fordham University	Private	New York City	The Bronx and Manhattan	Fordham Museum of Greek, Etruscan and Roman Art in The Bronx		Ildiko Butler and Pushpin Galleries in Lincoln Center Manhattan
Fulton-Montgomery Community College	Public	Johnstown	Fulton			Perella Gallery
Graduate Center	Public	New York City	Manhattan			James Gallery
Genesee Community College	Public	Batavia	Genesee			Roz Steiner Gallery
Hamilton College	Private	Clinton	Oneida	Ruth and Elmer Wellin Museum of Art	AAMG Member	
Hartwick College	Private	Oneonta	Otsego	Yager Museum of Art & Culture		Foreman Gallery
Herkimer County Community College	Public	Herkimer	Herkimer			Cogar Gallery
Hobart and William Smith Colleges	Private	Geneva	Seneca			Davis Gallery
Hofstra University	Private	Hempstead	Nassau	Hofstra University Museum	AAM Accredited, AAMG Member	Rosenberg Gallery, FORM Student Gallery
Hostos Community College	Public	New York City	The Bronx			Longwood Art Gallery at Hostos Center for Arts & Culture
Houghton University	Private	Houghton	Allegany			Ortlip Art Gallery
Hudson Valley Community College	Public	Troy	Rensselaer			The Teaching Gallery
Hunter College	Public	New York City	Manhattan			Bertha and Karl Leubsdorf Art Gallery at Hunter College, Hunter College/Times Square Gallery, Hunter College East Harlem Art Gallery
Iona University	Private	New Rochelle	Westchester			Brother Kenneth Chapman Gallery
Ithaca College	Private	Ithaca	Tompkins			Handwerker Gallery
Jamestown Community College	Public	Jamestown	Chautauqua			Weeks Gallery at Jamestown Community College
Jefferson Community College	Public	Watertown	Jefferson			Krantz Art Gallery
John Jay College of Criminal Justice	Public	New York City	Manhattan			Anya and Andrew Shiva Art Gallery,
Keuka College	Private	Keuka Park	Yates			Ginzburg Gallery, Lightner Art Gallery
Kingsborough Community College	Public	New York City	Brooklyn			Kingsborough Art Museum
Lehman College	Public	New York City	The Bronx			Lehman College Art Gallery
Le Moyne College	Private	Syracuse	Onondaga			Wilson Art Gallery
Long Island University	Private	Brookville	Nassau	Steinberg Museum of Art at Hillwood		Art League Students Gallery, Hutchins Gallery, Interactive Multimedia Arts Gallery
Manhattan Community College	Public	New York City	Manhattan			Shirley Fiterman Art Center
Manhattan University	Private	New York City	The Bronx			Fine Arts Department Gallery
Manhattanville University	Private	Purchase	Westchester			Arthur M. Berger Art Gallery
Marist University	Private	Poughkeepsie	Dutchess			Marist University Art Gallery
Marymount Manhattan College	Private	New York City	Manhattan			Hewitt Gallery of Art
Mercy University	Private	Dobbs Ferry	Westchester			Janalyn Hanson White Gallery, Lundy Commons Gallery
Metropolitan College of New York	Private	New York City	Manhattan			MCNY Art Gallery
Mohawk Valley Community College	Public	Utica	Oneida			Virginia M. and Edward Juergensen Gallery
Molloy University	Private	Rockville Centre	Nassau			Molloy University Art Gallery
Monroe Community College	Public	Brighton	Monroe		AAMG Member	Mercer Gallery
Morrisville State University	Public	Morrisville	Madison			Donald G. Butcher Library Gallery
Mount Saint Mary College	Private	Newburgh	Orange			Hudson Hall Art Gallery
Munson-Williams-Proctor Arts Institute	Private	Utica	Oneida	Munson-Williams-Proctor Arts Institute Museum of Art		
Nassau Community College	Public	East Garden City	Nassau			Firehouse Plaza Art Gallery
Nazareth University	Private	Rochester	Monroe			Colachino Art Gallery
New York Institute of Technology	Private	New York City	Manhattan			Gallery 61
New York University	Private	New York City	Manhattan	Grey Art Gallery (Has a permanent collection)	AAMG Member	Many galleries: 80WSE, Asian/Pacific/American Institute, Edgar M. Bronfman Center for Jewish Student Life Art Gallery, Casa Italiana Zerilli Marimò, Tracey-Barry Gallery in the Fales Library, Institute for the Study of the Ancient World, Kimmel Galleries (4 galleries in the Kimmel Center for University Life), Tisch Gulf & Western Gallery
Niagara County Community College	Public	Sanborn	Niagara			Dolce Valvo Art Center
Niagara University	Private	Lewiston	Niagara	Castellani Art Museum	AAMG Member	
Onondaga Community College	Public	Syracuse	Onondaga			The Gallery at the Ann Felton Multicultural Center
Pace University	Private	New York City	Manhattan			Peter Fingesten Gallery in Manhattan
Parsons The New School for Design	Private	New York City	Manhattan			Sheila C. Johnson Design Center: Anna-Maria and Stephen Kellen Gallery, and the Arnold and Sheila Aronson Gallery
Paul Smith's College	Private	Paul Smiths	Franklin			Paul Smith's College Visitor Interpretive Center
Pratt Institute	Private	New York City	Brooklyn			Pratt Manhattan Gallery in Manhattan President’s Office Gallery, Rubelle and Norman Schafler Gallery in Brooklyn
Queens College	Public	New York City	Queens	Godwin-Ternbach Museum		Queens College Art Center
Queensborough Community College	Public	New York City	Queens		AAMG Member	QCC Art Gallery
Rensselaer Polytechnic Institute	Private	Troy	Rensselaer			Art Gallery, West Hall-111
Roberts Wesleyan University	Private	Rochester	Monroe			Davison Galleries
Rochester Institute of Technology	Public	Henrietta	Monroe			Dyer Arts Center, Bevier Gallery
Rockland Community College	Public	Viola	Rockland			Student Art Gallery
Russell Sage College	Private	Albany	Albany			Opalka Gallery
Sarah Lawrence College	Private	Yonkers	Westchester			Barbara Walters Gallery in the Monika A. and Charles A. Heimbold, Jr. Visual Arts Center
Siena University	Private	Loudonville	Albany			Yates Gallery
Skidmore College	Private	Saratoga Springs	Saratoga	Frances Young Tang Teaching Museum & Art Gallery	AAMG Member	Schick Art Gallery, Case Gallery and Saisselin Art Center
St. Bonaventure University	Private	Allegany	Cattaraugus	Regina A. Quick Center for the Arts (St. Bonaventure)		Dresser Foundation; The Front; Paul W. Beltz; Paul and Toni Branch; Marianne Letro Laine; Winifred Shortell Kenney Galleries
St. Francis College	Private	New York City	Brooklyn			Callahan Center Art Gallery
St. John Fisher University	Private	Pittsford	Monroe			O’Keefe Ross Art Gallery in the Welcome Center
St. John's University	Private	New York City	Queens			Dr. M. T. Geoffrey Yeh Art Gallery
St. Lawrence University	Private	Canton	St. Lawrence			Richard F. Brush Art Gallery and Permanent Collection
St. Thomas Aquinas College	Private	Sparkill	Rockland			Azarian McCullough Art Gallery
Stony Brook University	Public	Stony Brook	Suffolk			Paul W. Zuccaire Gallery, Latin American and Caribbean Studies center’s Art Gallery, SAC Art Gallery
Suffolk County Community College	Public	Seldon	Suffolk			Maurice N. Flecker Memorial Gallery, Lyceum Gallery, Gallery West
SUNY Adirondack	Public	Queensbury	Warren			Visual Arts Gallery
SUNY Cobleskill	Public	Cobleskill	Schoharie			Grosvenor Art Gallery
SUNY College at Brockport	Public	Brockport	Monroe			Tower Fine Arts Gallery, West Side Gallery, Visual Studies Workshop
SUNY Cortland	Public	Cortland	Cortland			Dowd Gallery
SUNY Environmental Science and Forestry	Public	Syracuse	Onondaga			Fletcher Steele collection, F. Franklin Moon Library; Roosevelt Wild Life Station and Collection, Department of Environmental Forest Biology
SUNY Fredonia	Public	Fredonia	Chautauqua			Cathy and Jesse Marion Art Gallery, Emmitt Christian Gallery
SUNY Geneseo	Public	Geneseo	Livingston		AAMG Member	Lederer Lockhart Bridge Galleries: Lederer Gallery, Lockhart Gallery, Bridge Gallery, Gallery B2
SUNY New Paltz	Public	New Paltz	Ulster	Samuel Dorsky Museum of Art	AAMG Member	Fine Art Building Student Gallery, Student Gallery in the Smiley Art Building Galleries which comprise the Samuel Dorsky Museum of Art: Morgan Anderson Gallery, Howard Greenberg Family Gallery, Sara Bedrick Gallery, Corridor Gallery, Alice and Horace Chandler Gallery, and North Gallery
SUNY Old Westbury	Public	Old Westbury	Nassau			Amelie A. Wallace Gallery
SUNY Oneonta	Public	Oneonta	Otsego			Martin-Mullen Art Gallery, Project Space Gallery
SUNY Orange	Public	Middletown	Orange			Orange Hall Gallery in Middletown Mindy Ross Gallery in Newburgh
SUNY Oswego	Public	Oswego	Oswego			Tyler Art Gallery
SUNY Plattsburgh	Public	Plattsburgh	Clinton	Plattsburgh State Art Museum,	AAMG Member	Rockwell Kent Gallery and Collection Nina Winkel Sculpture Court Burke Gallery and Myers Lobby Gallery The Plattsburgh Sculpture Park
SUNY Polytechnic Institute	Public	Marcy	Oneida			Gannett Gallery
SUNY Potsdam	Public	Potsdam	St. Lawrence	Art Museum at SUNY Potsdam Charles T. Weaver Anthropology Museum		Hosmer Hall Gallery Gibson Gallery Dunn Hall Display
SUNY Purchase	Public	Purchase	Westchester	Neuberger Museum of Art	AAM Accredited, AAMG Member	Richard & Dolly Maass Gallery, Gallery 1019A, Installation Rms. 0028 & 1019B, The Passage Gallery
SUNY Ulster	Public	Stone Ridge	Ulster			Muroff-Kotler Visual Arts Gallery
Syracuse University	Private	Syracuse	Onondaga		AAMG Member	SU Art Museum, Palitz Gallery, The Warehouse Gallery, Lowe Art Gallery, Bird Library, The Robert B Menschel Photography Gallery, Panasci Lounge Art Hanging, The White Cube Gallery
Union College	Private	Schenectady	Schenectady	The Mandeville Gallery (Has a permanent collection)	AAMG Member	The Mandeville Gallery, The Wikoff Student Gallery, The Castrucci Gallery
University at Albany, State University of New York	Public	Albany	Albany	University Art Museum at University at Albany	AAMG Member	
University at Buffalo, State University of New York	Public	Buffalo	Erie		AAMG Member	UB Anderson Gallery, UB Art Gallery at the Center for the Arts
University of Rochester	Public	Rochester	Monroe	Memorial Art Gallery (Has a permanent collection) Hartnett Gallery	AAM Accredited	ASIS Gallery—Sage Art Center, The Gallery at the Art and Music Library, Hartnett Gallery, The pasSAGE Gallery
Utica University	Private	Utica	Oneida			Edith Langley Bartlett Art Gallery
Vassar	Private	Poughkeepsie	Dutchess	Frances Lehman Loeb Art Center	AAM Accredited	
Villa Maria College	Private	Buffalo	Erie			Paul William Beltz Family Art Gallery
Wagner College	Private	New York City	Staten Island			Union Gallery
Wells College	Private	Aurora	Cayuga			String Room Gallery
Westchester Community College	Public	Valhalla	Westchester			Westchester Community College Gallery
Yeshiva University	Private	New York City	Manhattan	Yeshiva University Museum	AAMG Member	

== See also ==
- University art museums and galleries in the United States
- List of museums in New York (state)
- List of nature centers in New York
- List of State University of New York units
- List of university museums in the United States
