= List of university museums in the United States =

This is a list of college and university museums in the United States.

== Overview ==
University art museums and galleries are collections of art that are developed, owned, and maintained by schools, colleges, and universities. There are approximately 680 university art museums and galleries in the United States. While historically the origins of these kinds of institutions can be traced back to learning collections in art academies in Western Europe, they are now most often housed in centers of higher education. The primary aim of many university art museums and galleries is to create a sphere removed from the pressures of the commercial art world where students, artists, curators, and faculty can experiment freely; in terms of both making and exhibiting art, and also curating.

=== Distinctions between art museums, galleries, and academic museums ===
An art museum houses a permanent collection, whereas a gallery usually hosts a changing program of art exhibitions. However, some university and college art galleries also feature permanent collections or showcase collections owned by the larger institution. Some institutions have a museum or an art gallery, and some have both. Others, such as the City College of New York, have important collections but neither a museum nor a dedicated gallery.

Art schools in the United States often have many gallery spaces on campus. Maryland Institute College of Art has 21 galleries.

Many university and college libraries also feature galleries to showcase items from their collections, which can include art, music, poetry, literary works and ephemera.

Another important distinction is the difference between art museums and academic museums. All university art museums and galleries are types of academic museums, but not all academic museums are university art museums and galleries.

=== Vulnerability in times of crisis ===
University art museums function in a number of different ways. Some exist as affiliates of a university, operated by a separate board of trustees and administration, while others are nested within the institution. Art museum collections can become vulnerable to deaccession due to fiscal issues. One such example of a controversial deaccession was the Randolph College scandal; when the administration sold paintings from the museum's collection without the permission of the museum.

=== Academic freedoms and artistic freedoms of expression ===
University art museums and galleries differ from traditional art museums and commercial galleries due to their relationship with institutions of higher education where academic freedoms are ideally upheld. With the protection of academic freedoms, topics that would otherwise be avoided, ignored, or censored can be openly explored. The two main academic freedoms are: the freedom of the student to study whatever they want, and the freedom of the teacher to teach whatever they want. When these two freedoms are observed, in the context of a university art museum and/or gallery, a unique setting for academic discovery is opened up. University art museums and exhibits are sometimes sources of controversies regarding issues of propriety, politics, gender, and sexuality.

== Alabama ==
- Alabama Museum of Health Sciences
- Alabama Museum of Natural History (UA Museums)
- Evelyn Burrow Museum at Wallace State Community College
- Gorgas House Museum (UA Museums)
- Jule Collins Smith Museum of Fine Art
- Kathryn Tucker Windham Museum
- Mildred Westervelt Warner Transportation Museum (UA Museums) (Closed effective July 1, 2024)
- Moundville Archaeological Park (UA Museums)
- Paul W. Bryant Museum (UA Museums)
- Southern Environmental Center
- Tuskegee Institute National Historic Site
- University of Alabama Museums (UA Museums)
- William R. Harvey Museum of Art at Talladega College

== Alaska ==
- University of Alaska Museum of the North

== Arizona ==
- Arizona State Museum
- Arizona State University Art Museum
- Center for Creative Photography
- Center for Meteorite Studies
- Louis Carlos Bernal Gallery
- University of Arizona Mineral Museum
- University of Arizona Museum of Art

== Arkansas ==
- Japanese American Internment Museum
- Lakeport Plantation
- Pfeiffer House and Carriage House
- Physical Education Building (Arkansas Tech University)

== California ==
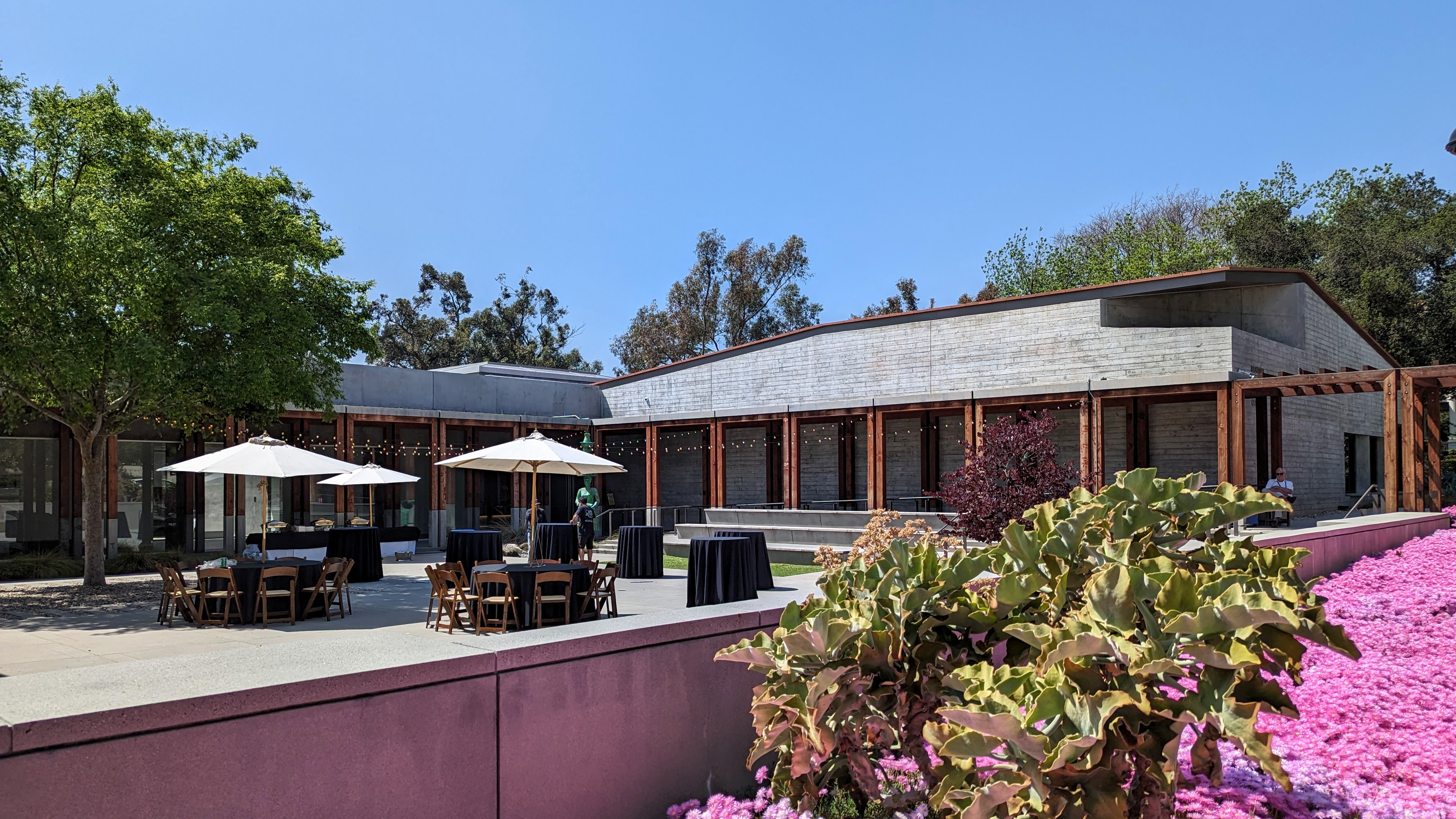
The Benton Museum of Art at Pomona College

- Academy of Art University Automobile Museum
- Art, Design & Architecture Museum
- Benton Museum of Art
- Berkeley Art Museum and Pacific Film Archive
- Bohart Museum of Entomology
- California Museum of Photography
- California Social Work Hall of Distinction
- Cantor Arts Center
- Coastal Science Campus
- De Saisset Museum
- Entomology Research Museum
- Essig Museum of Entomology
- Euphrat Museum of Art
- Fowler Museum at UCLA
- Frederick R. Weisman Museum of Art
- Fullerton Arboretum
- Janet Turner Print Museum
- Hammer Museum
- Humboldt State University Natural History Museum
- Jesse Peter Museum
- Lawrence Hall of Science
- Magnes Collection of Jewish Art and Life
- Museum of Vertebrate Zoology
- Phoebe A. Hearst Museum of Anthropology
- Robert and Frances Fullerton Museum of Art
- Natural History Museum at Sierra College
- UCLA Meteorite Collection
- University of California Museum of Paleontology
- USC Fisher Museum of Art
- USC Pacific Asia Museum

== Colorado ==
- Koshare Indian Museum and Dancers
- Louden-Henritze Archaeology Museum
- Mines Museum of Earth Science
- University of Colorado Museum of Natural History

== Connecticut ==
- Ballard Institute and Museum of Puppetry
- Connecticut State Museum of Natural History
- Davison Art Center
- Fairfield University Art Museum
- Housatonic Museum of Art
- Ireland's Great Hunger Museum
- J. Robert Donnelly Husky Heritage Sports Museum
- Peabody Museum of Natural History
- William Benton Museum of Art
- Yale Center for British Art
- Yale University Art Gallery
- Yale University Collection of Musical Instruments

== Delaware ==
- University Museums at the University of Delaware

== District of Columbia ==
- American University Museum
- George Washington University Art Galleries
- National Deaf Life Museum at Gallaudet University
- Textile Museum (George Washington University)

== Florida ==
- Alexander Brest Museum and Gallery
- Ashley Gibson Barnett Museum of Art at Florida Southern College
- Carnegie Library at FAMU
- Family Heritage House Museum
- Florida International Museum
- Florida Museum of Natural History
- Freedom Tower (Miami)
- Frost Art Museum
- Gillespie Museum
- Jacksonville University Life Sciences Museum
- John and Mable Ringling Museum of Art
- Leepa-Rattner Museum of Art
- Lowe Art Museum
- Mary McLeod Bethune Home
- Museum of Contemporary Art Jacksonville
- Museum of Florida Art and Culture
- NSU Art Museum Fort Lauderdale
- Rollins Museum of Art
- Ruth Funk Center for Textile Arts
- Samuel P. Harn Museum of Art
- University of South Florida Contemporary Art Museum
- Wolfsonian-FIU

== Georgia ==
- Georgia Museum of Art
- Georgia Museum of Natural History
- Georgia Southern Museum
- Michael C. Carlos Museum
- Oak Hill & The Martha Berry Museum
- Old Governor's Mansion (Milledgeville, Georgia)
- Robert C. Williams Museum of Papermaking
- SCAD Museum of Art
- Spelman College Museum of Fine Art

== Hawaii ==
- John Young Museum of Art

== Idaho ==
- Herrett Center for Arts and Science
- Orma J. Smith Museum of Natural History

== Illinois ==
- Cuneo Museum
- DePaul Art Museum
- Hull House
- Illinois Natural History Survey
- James Millikin House
- Krannert Art Museum
- Loyola University Museum of Art
- Mary and Leigh Block Museum of Art
- Museum of Contemporary Photography
- Koehnline Museum of Art at Oakton Community College
- Oriental Institute (Chicago)
- Renaissance Society
- Smart Museum of Art
- Sousa Archives and Center for American Music
- Spertus Institute for Jewish Learning and Leadership
- Spurlock Museum
- University Museum (Southern Illinois University Carbondale)
- William and Florence Schmidt Art Center

== Indiana ==
- Brauer Museum of Art
- David Owsley Museum of Art
- Eskenazi Museum of Art
- Glenn A. Black Laboratory of Archaeology
- National Art Museum of Sport
- Raclin Murphy Museum of Art

== Iowa ==
- B.J. Palmer House
- Brunnier Art Museum
- Christian Petersen Art Museum
- The Farm House (Knapp–Wilson House)
- Figge Art Museum
- Harlan–Lincoln House
- Palmer Museum of Chiropractic History
- University of Iowa Athletics Hall of Fame
- University of Iowa Museum of Natural History
- University of Iowa Stanley Museum of Art

== Kansas ==
- Gordon Parks Museum
- Lowell D. Holmes Museum of Anthropology
- Marianna Kistler Beach Museum of Art
- McPherson Museum
- Nerman Museum of Contemporary Art
- Old Castle Hall
- Robert J. Dole Institute of Politics
- Spencer Museum of Art
- Sternberg Museum of Natural History
- University of Kansas Natural History Museum

== Kentucky ==
- Cumberland Inn & Museum
- Kentucky Folk Art Center
- Kentucky Museum
- University of Kentucky Art Museum

== Louisiana ==
- Louisiana Center for Women in Government and Business Hall of Fame
- Louisiana Museum of Natural History
- LSU Museum of Art
- LSU Rural Life Museum
- Meadows Museum of Art
- Newcomb Art Museum
- Ogden Museum of Southern Art
- Paul and Lulu Hilliard University Art Museum
- Shaw Center for the Arts

== Maine ==
- Bates College Museum of Art
- Bowdoin College Museum of Art
- Hudson Museum
- Northern Maine Museum of Science
- Page Farm & Home Museum
- Peary–MacMillan Arctic Museum
- University of Maine Museum of Art

== Maryland ==
- Center for Art, Design and Visual Culture
- Evergreen Museum & Library
- Homewood Museum
- St. Mary's College of Maryland
- University of Maryland School of Nursing Living History Museum
- The Art Gallery at the University of Maryland

== Massachusetts ==
- Amherst Center for Russian Culture
- Arthur M. Sackler Museum
- Beneski Museum of Natural History
- Barnum Museum of Natural History
- Busch-Reisinger Museum
- Davis Museum at Wellesley College
- Dumbarton Oaks
- Emily Dickinson Museum
- Fogg Art Museum
- General Artemas Ward House
- Harvard Art Museums
- Harvard Mineralogical Museum
- Harvard Museum of Natural History
- Harvard Museum of the Ancient Near East
- Harvard University Herbaria
- List Visual Arts Center
- McMullen Museum of Art
- Mead Art Museum
- MIT Museum
- Mount Holyoke College Art Museum
- Museum of Comparative Zoology
- Peabody Museum of Archaeology and Ethnology
- Pioneer Village (Salem, Massachusetts)
- Rose Art Museum
- Smith College Museum of Art
- University Museum (Harvard University)
- University Museum of Contemporary Art
- Warren Anatomical Museum
- Williams College Museum of Art

== Michigan ==
- Dennos Museum Center
- Eli and Edythe Broad Art Museum
- Finnish American Heritage Center
- Great Lakes Quilt Center
- Jim Crow Museum of Racist Memorabilia
- Kalamazoo Valley Museum
- Kelsey Museum of Archaeology
- Kruizenga Art Museum
- Marshall M. Fredericks Sculpture Museum
- Meadow Brook Hall
- A. E. Seaman Mineral Museum
- Sindecuse Museum of Dentistry
- Stearns Collection of Musical Instruments
- University of Michigan Museum of Art
- University of Michigan Museum of Natural History
- William L. Clements Library

== Minnesota ==
- American Museum of Asmat Art
- Bell Museum of Natural History
- Glensheen Historic Estate
- Goldstein Museum of Design
- SMSU Art Museum
- SMSU Museum of Indigenous Americans
- SMSU Museum of Natural History
- Tweed Museum of Art
- Weisman Art Museum

== Mississippi ==
- University of Mississippi Museum

== Missouri ==
- Arthur F. McClure II Archives and University Museum
- Mildred Lane Kemper Art Museum
- Museum of Art and Archaeology
- Museum of Contemporary Religious Art
- National Churchill Museum
- National Museum of Toys and Miniatures
- Ralph Foster Museum
- Rosemary Berkel and Harry L. Crisp II Museum
- Saint Louis University Museum of Art
- Samuel Cupples House
- St. Louis Mercantile Library
- State Historical Society of Missouri

== Montana ==
- Montana Museum of Art & Culture
- Museum of the Rockies
- Philip L. Wright Zoological Museum
- SpectrUM Discovery Area

== Nebraska ==
- George W. Frank House
- Great Plains Art Museum
- International Quilt Museum
- Lentz Center for Asian Culture
- Lester F. Larsen Tractor Museum
- Museum of Nebraska Art
- Sheldon Museum of Art
- University of Nebraska State Museum

== Nevada ==
- Marjorie Barrick Museum of Art
- W. M. Keck Earth Science and Mineral Engineering Museum

== New Hampshire ==
- Hood Museum of Art
- Museum of the White Mountains

== New Jersey ==
- Geology Hall, New Brunswick, New Jersey
- New Jersey Museum of Agriculture
- Noyes Museum of Art of Stockton University
- Princeton University Art Museum
- Zimmerli Art Museum at Rutgers University

== New Mexico ==
- Blackwater Draw Museum
- Fleming Hall
- Harwood Museum of Art
- Institute of American Indian Arts
- Maxwell Museum of Anthropology
- Mesalands Community College's Dinosaur Museum
- Meteorite Museum at the University of New Mexico
- Museum of Southwestern Biology
- Silver Family Geology Museum
- University of New Mexico Art Museum
- Western Heritage Museum & Lea County Cowboy Hall of Fame

== New York ==
- Alfred Ceramic Art Museum
- American Merchant Marine Museum
- Anya and Andrew Shiva Art Gallery
- Casa Italiana Zerilli-Marimò
- Castellani Art Museum
- Center for Curatorial Studies, Bard College
- Children's Museum of Science and Technology
- Cooper Union
- Fordham Museum of Greek, Etruscan and Roman Art
- Fort Schuyler
- Frances Lehman Loeb Art Center
- The Frances Young Tang Teaching Museum and Art Gallery
- Godwin-Ternbach Museum
- Graduate Center, CUNY
- Grey Art Gallery
- Herbert F. Johnson Museum of Art
- Hostos Center for the Arts & Culture
- Institute for the Study of the Ancient World
- La Maison Française (New York University)
- Longyear Museum of Anthropology
- Mercer Gallery at Monroe Community College
- Memorial Art Gallery
- Munson-Williams-Proctor Arts Institute
- The Museum at FIT
- The New School
- Parsons School of Design
- Picker Art Gallery
- Plattsburgh State Art Museum
- Plaza Art Gallery
- Pratt Institute
- Ruth and Elmer Wellin Museum of Art
- Science Discovery Center of Oneonta
- University Art Museum at University at Albany
- West Point Museum
- Yager Museum of Art & Culture
- Yeshiva University Museum

== North Carolina ==
- Ackland Art Museum
- Duke Homestead and Tobacco Factory
- Gregg Museum of Art & Design
- Morehead Planetarium and Science Center
- Nasher Museum of Art
- North Carolina State University Insect Museum
- Weatherspoon Art Museum

== North Dakota ==
- North Dakota Museum of Art

== Ohio ==
- Allen Memorial Art Museum
- Billy Ireland Cartoon Library & Museum
- Dittrick Museum of Medical History
- Frank Museum of Art
- Karl Limper Geology Museum
- Kennedy Museum of Art
- McDonough Museum of Art
- Miami University Art Museum
- Richard Ross Museum of Art
- Springfield Center for the Arts at Wittenberg University
- University of Findlay's Mazza Museum
- William H. McGuffey House

== Oklahoma ==
- A. D. Buck Museum of Science and History
- Fred Jones Jr. Museum of Art
- National Wrestling Hall of Fame and Museum
- Sam Noble Oklahoma Museum of Natural History

== Oregon ==
- The Art Gym
- Hallie Ford Museum of Art
- Horner Museum
- Jensen Arctic Museum
- Jordan Schnitzer Museum of Art
- Kathrin Cawein Gallery of Art
- Pacific University Museum
- Prewitt–Allen Archaeological Museum
- University of Oregon Museum of Natural and Cultural History

== Pennsylvania ==
- Elmer H. Grimm Sr. Pharmacy Museum
- Frick Fine Arts Building
- Frost Entomological Museum
- Institute of Contemporary Art, Philadelphia
- Kelso Bible Lands Museum
- La Salle University Art Museum
- Miller ICA at Carnegie Mellon University
- Nationality Rooms
- Palmer Museum of Art
- Pennsylvania Academy of the Fine Arts
- Robot Hall of Fame
- Salk Hall
- Schisler Museum of Wildlife & Natural History and McMunn Planetarium
- Stephen Foster Memorial
- University of Pennsylvania Museum of Archaeology and Anthropology

== Rhode Island ==
- Annmary Brown Memorial
- Haffenreffer Museum of Anthropology
- Naval War College Museum
- Rhode Island School of Design Museum

== South Carolina ==
- Fort Hill (Clemson, South Carolina)
- Halsey Institute of Contemporary Art
- Hanover House (Clemson)
- Upcountry History Museum

== South Dakota ==
- Museum of Geology
- National Music Museum

== Tennessee ==
- Abraham Lincoln Library and Museum
- Art Museum of the University of Memphis
- Belmont Mansion (Tennessee)
- Chucalissa
- Lynn H. Wood Archaeological Museum
- McClung Museum of Natural History and Culture
- President Andrew Johnson Museum and Library

== Texas ==
- Blaffer Art Museum
- Blanton Museum of Art
- Centennial Museum and Chihuahuan Desert Gardens
- Dishman Art Museum
- Dolph Briscoe Center for American History
- H.J. Lutcher Stark Center for Physical Culture and Sports
- Harry Ransom Center
- Institute of Texan Cultures
- J. Wayne Stark Galleries
- Lubbock Lake Landmark
- Mayborn Museum Complex
- Meadows Museum
- Museum of Texas Tech University
- National Ranching Heritage Center
- Old Stone Fort Museum (Texas)
- Panhandle–Plains Historical Museum
- The Pearce Collections at Navarro College
- Sanders Corps of Cadets Center
- Spindletop-Gladys City Boomtown Museum
- Texas Science and Natural History Museum
- Woodland (Huntsville, Texas)

== Utah ==
- Brigham Young University Museum of Art
- Brigham Young University Museum of Peoples and Cultures
- BYU Museum of Paleontology
- Education in Zion Gallery
- Monte L. Bean Life Science Museum
- Natural History Museum of Utah
- Nora Eccles Harrison Museum of Art
- Southern Utah Museum of Art
- USU Eastern Prehistoric Museum
- USU Museum of Anthropology
- Utah Museum of Fine Arts

== Vermont ==
- Fleming Museum of Art
- Middlebury College Museum of Art
- Sullivan Museum and History Center

== Virginia ==
- Anderson Gallery
- Baron and Ellin Gordon Art Galleries
- Eleanor D. Wilson Museum
- Fralin Museum of Art
- Gari Melchers Home & Studio
- Highland (James Monroe house)
- Institute for Contemporary Art, Richmond
- Kluge-Ruhe Aboriginal Art Collection
- Lee Chapel
- Longwood Center for the Visual Arts
- Maier Museum of Art at Randolph College
- McCormick Observatory
- Muscarelle Museum of Art
- Pantops Farm

== Washington ==
- Burke Museum of Natural History and Culture
- Henry Art Gallery
- Slater Museum of Natural History

== West Virginia ==
- Art Museum of West Virginia University
- Jackson's Mill
- The Royce J. and Caroline B. Watts Museum

== Wisconsin ==
- Barlow Planetarium
- Chazen Museum of Art
- Thomas A. Greene Memorial Museum
- Grohmann Museum
- Patrick and Beatrice Haggerty Museum of Art
- L. R. Ingersoll Physics Museum
- Logan Museum of Anthropology
- UW–Madison Geology Museum
- Weis Earth Science Museum
- Wright Museum of Art

== Wyoming ==
- Tate Geological Museum
- University of Wyoming Anthropology Museum
- University of Wyoming Art Museum
- University of Wyoming Geological Museum
- Werner Wildlife Museum

== See also ==
- American Alliance of Museums
- Effects of the Great Recession on museums
- Museum Accreditation in America
