= List of Phi Sigma Iota chapters =

Phi Sigma Iota is a collegiate honor society for romance languages. In the following list of chapters, active chapters are indicated in bold and inactive chapters and institutions are in italics.

Number	Chapter	Charter date and range	Institution	Location	Status	Ref.
1	**Alpha Alpha**	1917	University of Denver	Denver, Colorado	Active	
0	**Alpha (Founder)**	1922	Allegheny College	Meadville, Pennsylvania	Active	
2	**Beta Beta**	1922	University of Missouri–Kansas City	Kansas City, Missouri	Active	
4	Beta	1925	Pennsylvania State University	University Park, Pennsylvania	Inactive	
300	Gamma Gamma I	1925–before 1962	Washington University in St. Louis	St. Louis, Missouri	Inactive	
5	**Gamma**	1926	College of Wooster	Wooster, Ohio	Active	
302	**Delta I**	1926–before 1962; xxxx ?	University of Iowa	Iowa City, Iowa	Active	
6	**Epsilon**	1926	Drake University	Des Moines, Iowa	Active	
303	**Zeta I**	1926–before 1962; xxxx ?	Coe College	Cedar Rapids, Iowa	Active	
301	**Eta I**	1926–before 1962; xxxx ?	Illinois Wesleyan University	Bloomington, Illinois	Active	
8	**Theta**	1926	Beloit College	Beloit, Wisconsin	Active	
304	**Iota I**	1927–before 1962; xxxx ?	Lawrence University	Appleton, Wisconsin	Active	
9	**Delta Delta**	1927	Texas Christian University	Fort Worth, Texas	Active	
7	**Kappa**	1928	Bates College	Lewiston, Maine	Active	
11	**Lambda**	1928	Muhlenberg College	Allentown, Pennsylvania	Active	
305	**Epsilon Epsilon**	1928	University of Colorado Boulder	Boulder, Colorado	Active	
3	**Zeta Zeta**	1928	University of Northern Colorado	Greeley, Colorado	Active	
10	**Theta Theta**	1928	University of Wyoming	Laramie, Wyoming	Active	
12	**Mu**	1929–before 1962; xxxx ?	Lake Forest College	Lake Forest, Illinois	Active	
306	Nu	1929–before 1962	Morningside University	Sioux City, Iowa	Inactive	
13	**Xi**	1929	University of South Dakota	Vermillion, South Dakota	Active	
307	**Omicron**	1929	Colby College	Waterville, Maine	Active	
308	**Pi I**	1930–before 1962; xxxx ?	DePauw University	Greencastle, Indiana	Active	
58	**Rho**	1930–before 1962; 1968	University of Rochester	Rochester, New York	Active	
14	**Sigma**	1930	Emory University	Atlanta, Georgia	Active	
15	**Tau**	1931	Gettysburg College	Gettysburg, Pennsylvania	Active	
16	**Upsilon**	1931	Birmingham–Southern College	Birmingham, Alabama	Active	
	Iota Iota I	1931–before 1962	Arizona State University	Flagstaff, Arizona	Inactive	
17	**Lambda Lambda**	1933	New Mexico Highlands University	Las Vegas, New Mexico	Active	
18	**Phi**	1933	Otterbein University	Westerville, Ohio	Active	
19	Phi Alpha	1936–20xx ?	Louisiana State University	Baton Rouge, Louisiana	Inactive	
21	**Phi Beta**	1936	Wittenberg University	Springfield, Ohio	Active	
22	**Phi Gamma**	1938	Vanderbilt University	Nashville, Tennessee	Active	
23	**Phi Delta**	1938	University of Nebraska–Lincoln	Lincoln, Nebraska	Active	
20	**Phi Epsilon**	1939–before 1962; xxxx ?	Northwestern University	Evanston, Illinois	Active	
24	**Phi Zeta**	1939	University of Washington	Seattle, Washington	Active	
25	**Phi Eta**	1940	Hobart and William Smith Colleges	Geneva, New York	Active	
26	**Phi Theta**	1945	William Jewell College	Liberty, Missouri	Active	
27	Phi Iota	1946–before 1962	Syracuse University	Syracuse, New York	Inactive	
28	**Phi Kappa**	1947	Tulane University	New Orleans, Louisiana	Active	
29	Phi Mu	1948–20xx ?	University of New Mexico	Albuquerque, New Mexico	Inactive	
30	**Phi Nu**	1948	Muskingum University	New Concord, Ohio	Active	
34	**Phi Xi**	1949	Saint Louis University	St. Louis, Missouri	Active	
31	**Phi Omicron**	1950	University of Mary Washington	Fredericksburg, Virginia	Active	
32	**Phi Pi**	1950	Centenary College of Louisiana	Shreveport, Louisiana	Active	
33	**Phi Lambda**	1950	University of Kentucky	Lexington, Kentucky	Active	
35	**Phi Rho**	1952	Indiana University Bloomington	Bloomington, Indiana	Active	
36	Phi Sigma	1954	Hiram College	Hiram, Ohio	Inactive	
37	**Phi Tau**	1955	Indiana State University	Terre Haute, Indiana	Active	
38	**Phi Upsilon**	1955	Willamette University	Salem, Oregon	Active	
39	**Phi Phi**	1955	Texas Woman's University	Denton, Texas	Active	
40	**Phi Chi**	1955	North Central College	Naperville, Illinois	Active	
41	**Phi Psi**	1956	Case Western Reserve University	Cleveland, Ohio	Active	
42	**Phi Omega**	1956	Boston University	Boston, Massachusetts	Active	
43	**Sigma Alpha**	1957	Ripon College	Ripon, Wisconsin	Active	
45	**Sigma Gamma**	1958	Furman University	Greenville, South Carolina	Active	
46	**Sigma Delta**	1958	Wake Forest University	Winston-Salem, North Carolina	Active	
47	**Sigma Epsilon**	1961	Rollins College	Winter Park, Florida	Active	
48	**Sigma Zeta**	1963	Iowa State University	Ames, Iowa	Active	
49	**Sigma Eta**	1964	James Madison University	Harrisonburg, Virginia	Active	
50	**Sigma Iota**	1964	University of Michigan	Ann Arbor, Michigan	Active	
51	**Sigma Kappa**	1964	Michigan State University	East Lansing, Michigan	Active	
52	Sigma Theta	1965	Colorado State University	Fort Collins, Colorado	Inactive	
53	Sigma Lambda	1965	Heidelberg College	Tiffin, Ohio	Inactive	
54	**Sigma Omicron**	1966	Wesleyan College	Macon, Georgia	Active	
55	**Sigma Xi**	1966	Ohio University	Athens, Ohio	Active	
56	**Sigma Mu**	1967–xxxx ?; 20xx ?	Stony Brook University	Stony Brook, New York	Active	
57	**Sigma Pi**	1967	Colorado College	Colorado Springs, Colorado	Active	
59	**Sigma Rho**	1967	University of Utah	Salt Lake City, Utah	Active	
60	**Sigma Sigma**	1969	Rutgers University–New Brunswick	New Brunswick, New Jersey	Active	
61	**Sigma Tau**	1969	Alfred University	Alfred, New York	Active	
62	**Sigma Upsilon**	1969	East Carolina University	Greenville, North Carolina	Active	
63	Sigma Phi	1969	University of Hartford	West Hartford, Connecticut	Inactive	
64	**Sigma Chi**	1970	Pace University	New York City, New York	Active	
65	**Sigma Psi**	1971	College of the Holy Cross	Worcester, Massachusetts	Active	
66	**Sigma Omega**	1971	Duquesne University	Pittsburgh, Pennsylvania	Active	
67	**Iota Alpha**	1972	Virginia Tech	Blacksburg, Virginia	Active	
68	**Iota Beta**	1974	Mercy University	Dobbs Ferry, New York	Active	
69	**Iota Gamma**	1974	University of South Carolina	Columbia, South Carolina	Active	
70	**Iota Epsilon**	1975	University of Richmond	Richmond, Virginia	Active	
71	**Iota Delta**	1975	University of Maine	Orono, Maine	Active	
72	**Iota Zeta**	1976	Northeastern University	Boston, Massachusetts	Active	
73	**Iota Eta**	1976	Centre College	Danville, Kentucky	Active	
74	**Iota Theta**	1976	Bloomsburg University of Pennsylvania	Bloomsburg, Pennsylvania	Active	
75	**Iota Iota**	1977	Saint Francis University	Loretto, Pennsylvania	Active	
76	**Iota Mu**	1977	University of Texas at Arlington	Arlington, Texas	Active	
77	**Iota Nu**	1977	Hamilton College	Clinton, New York	Active	
79	**Iota Xi**	1978	Ohio Wesleyan University	Delaware, Ohio	Active	
78	**Iota Omicron**	1978	Adams State University	Alamosa, Colorado	Active	
80	**Iota Pi**	1978	Eastern University	St. Davids, Pennsylvania	Active	
81	Omicron	1978	Union University	Jackson, Tennessee	Inactive	
82	**Delta**	1978	Northern Illinois University	DeKalb, Illinois	Active	
83	**Zeta**	1978	Gordon College	Wenham, Massachusetts	Active	
84	Eta	1978	Southwest Texas State University	San Marcos, Texas	Inactive	
85	**Iota**	1978	Wabash College	Crawfordsville, Indiana	Active	
86	**Nu**	1978	Lincoln University	Lincoln University, Pennsylvania	Active	
87	**Pi**	1978	Southern University at New Orleans	New Orleans, Louisiana	Active	
88	**Psi**	1979	St. Norbert College	De Pere, Wisconsin	Active	
89	**Chi**	1978	Fort Lewis College	Durango, Colorado	Active	
90	**Omega**	1979	University of Nevada, Las Vegas	Las Vegas, Nevada	Active	
91	**Gamma Gamma**	1979	University of Alabama in Huntsville	Huntsville, Alabama	Active	
92	**Eta Eta**	1979	Mercer University	Macon, Georgia	Active	
93	**Kappa Kappa**	1979	Hampden–Sydney College	Hampden Sydney, Virginia	Active	
94	**Mu Mu**	1979	Northern Michigan University	Marquette, Michigan	Active	
95	**Nu Nu**	1979	Portland State University	Portland, Oregon	Active	
96	**Xi Xi**	1979	University of Pittsburgh	Pittsburgh, Pennsylvania	Active	
97	**Omicron Alpha**	1979	Skidmore College	Saratoga Springs, New York	Active	
98	Pi Pi	1979	Albertus Magnus College	New Haven, Connecticut	Inactive	
99	**Rho Rho**	1979	University of Michigan–Flint	Flint, Michigan	Active	
100	**Tau Tau**	1979	University of California, Riverside	Riverside, California	Active	
101	**Upsilon Upsilon**	1979	Austin College	Sherman, Texas	Active	
102	**Chi Chi**	1979	University of Rhode Island	Kingston, Rhode Island	Active	
103	**Psi Psi**	1979	University of North Texas	Denton, Texas	Active	
104	**Alpha Gamma**	1979	Central State University	Wilberforce, Ohio	Active	
105	**Omega Omega**	1980	College of New Rochelle	New Rochelle, New York	Active	
106	**Alpha Beta**	1980	Millikin University	Decatur, Illinois	Active	
107	**Alpha Delta**	1980	Radford University	Radford, Virginia	Active	
108	**Alpha Epsilon**	1980	University of Bridgeport	Bridgeport, Connecticut	Active	
109	**Alpha Zeta**	1980	University of Virginia	Charlottesville, Virginia	Active	
110	**Alpha Eta**	1980	Gallaudet University	Washington, D.C.	Active	
111	**Alpha Theta**	1980	Lebanon Valley College	Annville, Pennsylvania	Active	
112	Alpha Iota	1980–20xx ?	University at Buffalo	Buffalo, New York	Inactive	
113	**Alpha Kappa**	1980	Illinois College	Jacksonville, Illinois	Active	
114	**Alpha Lambda**	1980	North Carolina State University	Raleigh, North Carolina	Active	
116	**Alpha Nu**	1980	Morris Brown College	Atlanta, Georgia	Active	
117	**Alpha Xi**	1980	University of Maryland, College Park	College Park, Maryland	Active	
115	**Alpha Mu**	1981	University of New Hampshire	Durham, New Hampshire	Active	
118	Alpha Omicron	1981–20xx ?	University of Central Arkansas	Conway, Arkansas	Inactive	
119	**Alpha Pi**	1981	Plymouth State University	Plymouth, New Hampshire	Active	
120	**Alpha Rho**	1981	Converse University	Spartanburg, South Carolina	Active	
121	**Alpha Sigma**	1981	Kentucky Christian University	Grayson, Kentucky	Active	
122	Alpha Tau	1981	Universidad Regiomontana	Monterrey, Mexico	Inactive	
123	**Alpha Upsilon**	1981	Niagara University	Niagara University, New York	Active	
124	**Alpha Phi**	1981	State University of New York at Geneseo	Geneseo, New York	Active	
125	Alpha Chi	1981	West Texas State University	Canyon, Texas	Inactive	
126	**Alpha Psi**	1981	Millersville University of Pennsylvania	Millersville, Pennsylvania	Active	
127	**Alpha Omega**	1982	University of West Georgia	Carrollton, Georgia	Active	
128	**Beta Gamma**	1982	Rhode Island College	Providence, Rhode Island	Active	
129	**Beta Delta**	1982	Santa Clara University	Santa Clara, California	Active	
130	**Beta Epsilon**	1982	State University of New York at Oneonta	Oneonta, New York	Active	
131	**Delta Alpha**	1983	Ursinus College	Collegeville, Pennsylvania	Active	
132	**Delta Beta**	1983	Providence College	Providence, Rhode Island	Active	
137	**Delta Gamma**	1983	University of Alaska Fairbanks	Fairbanks, Alaska	Active	
134	**Delta Iota**	1983	Holy Family University	Philadelphia, Pennsylvania	Active	
133	**Delta Kappa**	1983	Sacred Heart University	Fairfield, Connecticut	Active	
135	**Delta Lambda**	1983	Moravian University	Bethlehem, Pennsylvania	Active	
136	**Delta Sigma**	1983	Southern Oregon University	Ashland, Oregon	Active	
138	**Delta Epsilon**	1984	Pace University Pleasantville Campus	Pleasantville, New York	Active	
139	**Delta Zeta**	1984	High Point University	High Point, North Carolina	Active	
140	**Delta Pi**	1984	Louisiana State University Shreveport	Shreveport, Louisiana	Active	
141	**Delta Phi**	1984	Lehigh University	Bethlehem, Pennsylvania	Active	
142	**Eta Alpha**	1984	San Francisco State University	San Francisco, California	Active	
143	**Eta Gamma**	1984	California State University, Fresno	Fresno, California	Active	
144	Eta Delta	1985–20xx ?	Western Oregon University	Monmouth, Oregon	Active	
145	**Eta Epsilon**	1985	Texas Southern University	Houston, Texas	Active	
146	**Kappa Alpha**	1985	Agnes Scott College	Decatur, Georgia	Active	
	Sigma Beta	1985	Immaculate Heart College	Los Angeles, California	Inactive	
147	**Kappa Beta**	1985	DeSales University	Center Valley, Pennsylvania	Active	
148	**Kappa Gamma**	1985	Methodist University	Fayetteville, North Carolina	Active	
149	**Kappa Delta**	1986	Jacksonville University	Jacksonville, Florida	Active	
150	**Kappa Epsilon**	1986	Weber State University	Ogden, Utah	Active	
151	Kappa Zeta	1986	Middle Tennessee State University	Murfreesboro, Tennessee	Inactive	
152	**Kappa Eta**	1986	State University of New York at Oswego	Oswego, New York	Active	
153	**Kappa Iota**	1986	La Salle University	Philadelphia, Pennsylvania	Active	
154	**Kappa Lambda**	1986	Butler University	Indianapolis, Indiana	Active	
155	**Kappa Mu**	1986	San Jose State University	San Jose, California	Active	
156	**Kappa Nu**	1987	University of Southern Maine	Portland, Maine	Active	
157	Kappa Xi	1987–20xx ?	Rosemont College	Rosemont, Pennsylvania	Inactive	
158	**Kappa Omicron**	1987	Susquehanna University	Selinsgrove, Pennsylvania	Active	
159	**Kappa Pi**	1987	Northern Arizona University	Flagstaff, Arizona	Active	
161	**Kappa Rho**	1987	Bradley University	Peoria, Illinois	Active	
160	**Kappa Sigma**	1987	American University of Paris	Paris, France	Active	
162	**Kappa Tau**	1987	University of Lynchburg	Lynchburg, Virginia	Active	
164	**Kappa Upsilon**	1987	Kutztown University of Pennsylvania	Kutztown, Pennsylvania	Active	
163	**Kappa Phi**	1987	Saint Joseph's University	Philadelphia, Pennsylvania	Active	
165	**Kappa Chi**	1987	Caldwell University	Caldwell, New Jersey	Active	
166	**Kappa Psi**	1987	Washburn University	Topeka, Kansas	Active	
167	**Kappa Theta**	1987	St. Mary's University, Texas	San Antonio, Texas	Active	
168	**Kappa Omega**	1987	State University of New York at New Paltz	New Paltz, New York	Active	
169	**Delta Theta**	1987	University of North Alabama	Florence, Alabama	Active	
170	**Dela Eta**	1988	United States Naval Academy	Annapolis, Maryland	Active	
171	**Delta Mu**	1988	St. Thomas Aquinas College	Sparkill, New York	Active	
172	**Sigma Nu**	1988	Fort Hays State University	Hays, Kansas	Active	
173	**Delta Xi**	1988	Emory and Henry College	Emory, Virginia	Active	
174	**Delta Omicron**	1988	Gannon University	Erie, Pennsylvania	Active	
175	**Delta Rho**	1998	Cameron University	Lawton, Oklahoma	Active	
176	**Delta Tau**	1988	University of the Virgin Islands	Saint Thomas, U.S. Virgin Islands	Active	
177	**Delta Upsilon**	1989	Hastings College	Hastings, Nebraska	Active	
178	**Delta Chi**	1989	Lycoming College	Williamsport, Pennsylvania	Active	
179	**Delta Nu**	1989	Benedictine University	Lisle, Illinois	Active	
180	**Delta Psi**	1989	Salem College	Winston-Salem, North Carolina	Active	
181	**Iota Kappa**	1989	Metropolitan State University of Denver	Denver, Colorado	Active	
182	Iota Lambda	1989–20xx ?	Valley City State University	Valley City, North Dakota	Inactive	
183	**Iota Omega**	1990	University of Indianapolis	Indianapolis, Indiana	Active	
184	**Beta Alpha**	1990	McDaniel College	Westminster, Maryland	Active	
185	**Beta Epsilon**	1990	Rockford University	Rockford, Illinois	Active	
186	**Beta Zeta**	1990	University of South Florida	Tampa, Florida	Active	
187	**Beta Iota**	1990	University of Texas at El Paso	El Paso, Texas	Active	
188	**Beta Theta**	1991	Capital University	Columbus, Ohio	Active	
189	**Beta Kappa**	1991	Marietta College	Marietta, Ohio	Active	
190	**Beta Lambda**	1991	Wingate University	Wingate, North Carolina	Active	
191	**Beta Mu**	1991	Thunderbird School of Global Management	Glendale, Arizona	Active	
192	**Beta Nu**	1992	United States Military Academy	West Point, New York	Active	
193	Beta Xi	1992	Southern University	Baton Rouge, Louisiana	Inactive	
194	**Beta Omicron**	1992	Washington State University	Pullman, Washington	Active	
195	Beta Sigma	1992–20xx ?	University of Alabama at Birmingham	Birmingham, Alabama	Inactive	
196	**Beta Pi**	1992	Pennsylvania Western University, Edinboro	Edinboro, Pennsylvania	Active	
197	**Beta Tau**	1992	California State University, Chico	Chico, California	Active	
198	**Beta Rho**	1993	Missouri Southern State University	Joplin, Missouri	Active	
199	Beta Tau	1992–20xx ?	University of Florida	Gainesville, Florida	Inactive	
199	Beta Upsilon	1993	Dowling College	Oakdale, New York	Inactive	
200	**Beta Phi**	1993	University of Missouri	Columbia, Missouri	Active	
201	**Beta Psi**	1993	Keene State College	Keene, New Hampshire	Active	
202	**Beta Omega**	1993	Binghamton University	Binghamton, New York	Active	
203	**Gamma Alpha**	1994	Marywood University	Scranton, Pennsylvania	Active	
204	**Gamma Beta**	1993	Catawba College	Salisbury, North Carolina	Active	
205	**Gamma Delta**	1993	University of Michigan–Dearborn	Dearborn, Michigan	Active	
206	**Gamma Epsilon**	1994	University of Arizona	Tucson, Arizona	Active	
207	**Gamma Zeta**	1994	Southern Utah University	Cedar City, Utah	Active	
208	**Gamma Eta**	1995	East Stroudsburg University of Pennsylvania	East Stroudsburg, Pennsylvania	Active	
209	**Gamma Theta**	1995	Western Carolina University	Cullowhee, North Carolina	Active	
210	**Gamma Iota**	1995	Loyola University Maryland	Baltimore, Maryland	Active	
211	**Gamma Kappa**	1995	University of Tulsa	Tulsa, Oklahoma	Active	
212	**Gamma Lambda**	1995	Chatham University	Pittsburgh, Pennsylvania	Active	
213	**Gamm Mu**	1995	University of Texas at San Antonio	San Antonio, Texas	Active	
214	**Gamma Mu**	1995	Belmont University	Nashville, Tennessee	Active	
215	**Gamma Xi**	1995	Cabrini University	Radnor Township, Pennsylvania	Active	
216	**Gamma Omicron**	1996	Northwest Missouri State University	Maryville, Missouri	Active	
217	**Gamma Pi**	1996	Kent State University	Kent, Ohio	Active	
218	**Gamma Rho**	1996	Carroll College	Helena, Montana	Active	
219	**Gamma Sigma**	1996	Mercyhurst University	Erie, Pennsylvania	Active	
220	**Gamma Tau**	1997	Ashland University	Ashland, Ohio	Active	
221	**Gamma Upsilon**	1997	McNeese State University	Lake Charles, Louisiana	Active	
222	**Gamma Phi**	1997	Northern Kentucky University	Highland Heights, Kentucky	Active	
224	**Gamma Chi**	1997	Union College	Schenectady, New York	Active	
223	**Gamma Psi**	1997	Saint Peter's University	Jersey City, New Jersey	Active	
225	**Gamma Omega**	1997	Saint Elizabeth University	Morristown, New Jersey	Active	
226	**Epsilon Alpha**	1998	Florida State University	Tallahassee, Florida	Active	
227	**Epsilon Beta**	1998	University of Evansville	Evansville, Indiana	Active	
228	**Epsilon Gamma**	1998	Abilene Christian University	Abilene, Texas	Active	
229	**Epsilon Delta**	1999	Hanover College	Hanover, Indiana	Active	
230	**Epsilon Epsilon**	1999	Carnegie Mellon University	Pittsburgh, Pennsylvania	Active	
231	**Epsilon Eta**	2000	Cleveland State University	Cleveland, Ohio	Active	
232	**Chi Phi**	2001	Salisbury University	Salisbury, Maryland	Active	
233	**Epsilon Theta**	2001	University of Colorado at Colorado Springs	Colorado, Springs	Active	
234	**Epsilon Iota**	2001	Sul Ross State University	Alpine, Texas	Active	
235	**Epsilon Kappa**	2001	LIU Post	Brookville, New York	Active	
236	**Epsilon Lambda**	2001	Central College	Pella, Iowa	Active	
239	Epsilon Xi	2001–20xx ?	Utah State University	Logan, Utah	Inactive	
240	**Epsilon Pi**	2002	Coker College	Hartsville, South Carolina	Active	
241	**Zeta Alpha**	2004	Southeastern Louisiana University	Hammond, Louisiana	Active	
243	Epsilon Omicron	2003	Defense Language Institute	Monterey, California	Inactive	
244	**Lambda Xi**	2004	Virginia Military Institute	Lexington, Virginia	Active	
245	**Zeta Beta**	2004	Bentley University	Waltham, Massachusetts	Active	
246	Zeta Delta	2007–20xx ?	McPherson College	McPherson, Kansas	Inactive	
	**Zeta Chi**	2007	Saint Vincent College	Latrobe, Pennsylvania	Active	
248	**Zeta Epsilon**	2007	Spring Hill College	Mobile, Alabama	Active	
249	**Mu Alpha**	2010	Hartwick College	Oneonta, New York	Active	
250	**Mu Beta**	2010	Chestnut Hill College	Philadelphia, Pennsylvania	Active	
251	**Lambda Beta**	2011	Xavier University of Louisiana	New Orleans, Louisiana	Active	
252	**Chi Sigma**	2022	California Polytechnic State University, San Luis Obispo	San Luis Obispo, California	Active	
256	**Eta Mu**	2008	Cornerstone University	Grand Rapids, Michigan	Active	
257	**Omicron Gamma**	2009	Ohio State University	Columbus, Ohio	Active	
258	**Iota Chi**	2009	Chicago State University	Chicago, Illinois	Active	
259	**Omega Beta**	2009	Piedmont University	Demorest, Georgia	Active	
260	**Omega Alpha**	2009	Salem State University	Salem, Massachusetts	Active	
262	**Chi Zeta**	2012	Bryant University	Smithfield, Rhode Island	Active	
263	**Chi Omega**	2012	University of South Alabama	Mobile, Alabama	Active	
265	**Chi Nu**	2013	Harding University	Searcy, Arkansas	Active	
266	**Chi Theta**	2013	Doane University	Crete, Nebraska	Active	
267	**Chi Lambda**	2014	Southern Connecticut State University	New Haven, Connecticut	Active	
268	**Chi Alpha**	2015	University of Mississippi	University, Mississippi	Active	
269	**Chi Beta**	2015	Indiana University of Pennsylvania	Indiana, Pennsylvania	Active	
270	Chi Gamma	2015–20xx ?	State University of New York at Fredonia	Fredonia, New York	Inactive	
271	**Chi Epsilon**	2016	Lee University	Cleveland, Tennessee	Active	
272	**Chi Iota**	2016	Brigham Young University	Provo, Utah	Active	
273	**Chi Eta**	2017	State University of New York Brockport	Brockport, New York	Active	
274	**Chi Kappa**	2017	Gonzaga University	Spokane, Washington	Active	
275	**Chi Mu**	2017	George Mason University	Fairfax, Virginia	Active	
276	**Chi Omicron**	2019	Young Harris College	Young Harris, Georgia	Active	
277	**Chi Phi**	2019	Manhattan College	Riverdale, Bronx, New York	Active	
278	**Epsilon Zeta**	2000–20xx ?; 2020	Notre Dame of Maryland University	Baltimore, Maryland	Active	
279	**Chi Rho**	2020	Luther College	Decorah, Iowa	Active	
			Georgia State University	Atlanta, Georgia	Active	
			Rutgers University–Camden	Camden, New Jersey	Active	
