= Binghamton University Art Museum =

Art museum at Binghamton University in Binghamton, New York

- Location in New York State
- Location: 4400 Vestal Parkway East, Binghamton, New York
- Coordinates: 42°5′20.4″N 75°58′14″W
- Owner: Binghamton University
- Website: https://www.binghamton.edu/art-museum/

The Binghamton University Art Museum is an art museum in Binghamton, New York within Binghamton University. Located on the second floor of the main Fine Arts Building on the campus, the museum's permanent collection includes over 3,500 works from various eras and of different media. It includes "paintings, sculpture, prints, photographs, drawings, glass, ceramic, metalwork, manuscript pages and textiles from Egypt, Greece, Asia, Africa, Europe, North America and pre-Columbian cultures." As of 2013, the University Art Museum began an initiative to expand the accessibility of the collection with the greater public and to heighten its commitment to education. The facility is not currently accredited.

The late professor Kenneth Lindsay, for whom the Kenneth C Lindsay Study room is named, founded the university's visual arts program and began its permanent art collection. Lindsay was one of the Monuments Men who retrieved art at the end of World War II.

== Mission statement ==
"The mission of the Binghamton University Art Museum is to collect, preserve, present and document works of art from diverse cultures for the education, enrichment and entertainment of the campus community, the Greater Binghamton area, as well as the national and international art world. The museum has three main areas of operation: its permanent collection, temporary exhibitions, and educational outreach."

Students are offered a chance to curate exhibitions within the museum as well as showcasing works. The museum offers free information tours for schools groups who come to campus and participates in a Lifelong Learning Program for adults.

== Notable exhibitions and permanent collection ==
In an exhibition opened in January 2014, the museum showcased 50 works on paper from the 15th to 20th centuries, selected from its permanent collection, including works by Albrecht Dürer and Salvador Dalí. The collection also includes works of Henry Moore and Philip Guston and is available to tour during public hours every week or by appointment in the Kenneth C. Lindsay Study room.

== Facilities ==
Elsie B Rosefsky Gallery is located on the second floor of the arts building. This gallery on campus showcases special exhibitions and student work.

Kenneth C. Lindsay Study room offers students, faculty and visitors of the museum the chance to request objects from the permanent collection for further research.

A second floor mezzanine showcases works from the permanent collection while the main gallery space hosts rotating exhibitions from international artists and traveling exhibitions.

== See also ==
- List of university art museums and galleries in New York State
