= Yager Museum of Art & Culture =

- Location of Yager Museum of Art & Culture in New York State
- Established: 1929
- Location: Yager Hall; Oneonta, New York
- Coordinates: 42.4579°N 75.0706°W
- Type: Anthropology, art museum
- Owner: Hartwick College
- Website: https://www.hartwick.edu/campus-life/arts-culture/yager-museum/

The Yager Museum of Art & Culture is located on the campus of Hartwick College in Oneonta, New York and is open to the public during the academic year; summer hours vary.

The museum features archaeology collections from the Upper Susquehanna area of prehistoric and early Native American items. Other collections include ethnographic North and South American Indian artifacts, including baskets, pottery, clothing, rugs, jewelry, and masks, craft items from Micronesia, and fine art from the United States, Europe, Russia, and Asia. Among recent acquisitions are over 150 photographs and prints by Andy Warhol, given by the Andy Warhol Foundation for the Visual Arts as part of their Photographic Legacy Program.

Also on Hartwick's campus is the Foreman Gallery, a contemporary art gallery with several changing exhibitions per year.

Together, the Yager Museum and the Foreman Gallery provide a focus for the college's Museum Studies minor program. Students develop exhibitions and public programs as part of the Museum Studies curriculum.

The Yager Museum is a member of the International Association of Academic Museums & Galleries, AAMG, the American Alliance of Museums, the American Association for State and Local History, and the Museum Association of New York MANY.

== See also ==
University Art Museums and Galleries in New York State
