= Statutory college =

Legal term in the United States

In the United States, a statutory college or contract college is a higher education college or school that is a component of an independent, private university that has been designated by the state legislature to receive significant, ongoing public funding from that respective state. The statutory college is operated by the university with state funding used to serve specific educational needs of the state.

== Delaware ==
The University of Delaware in Newark and Delaware State University in Dover are both chartered as "privately governed, state-assisted" universities. They receive about 10 percent of their operating budgets from the state.

== Florida ==
Beginning in 2004, the University of Miami's Miller School of Medicine in Miami began offering instruction on the campus of Florida Atlantic University in Boca Raton. MD candidates are admitted to either the Miami or Boca Raton programs and spend all four years studying on the selected campus.

The Miami and Boca Raton campuses charge identical tuition, with a lower tuition for in-state Florida students.

== New York ==
In New York state, statutory colleges are administratively affiliated with the State University of New York (SUNY) system, and receive funding from SUNY's operating budget. There are five statutory colleges: four located at Cornell University in Ithaca and one located at Alfred University in Alfred.

New York state education law uses both "contract college" and "statutory college" to describe these state-supported colleges.

=== Alfred University ===
The statutory college located at Alfred University in Alfred, New York is:

- New York State College of Ceramics (established 1900)

The New York State College of Ceramics (NYSCC) consists of the School of Art and Design, with its own dean, and four state-supported materials programs cross-organized within Alfred University's School of Engineering. The College of Ceramics is functioning technically as a "holding entity" (overseen by a unit head/Vice President of Statutory Affairs) for the fiscal support of the state programs and the NYSCC mission. The unit head assists with budget preparation for the two aforementioned AU schools and the NYSCC-affiliated Scholes Library of Ceramics (part of the campuswide, unified AU library system), and acts in a liaison role to SUNY.

The School of Art and Design, technically a subunit of the College of Ceramics but autonomously run with its own dean, is further subdivided into divisions. Alfred's School of Engineering (also N b. +. run with its own dean) currently has four state-supported programs and two privately endowed programs.

=== Cornell University ===
The four statutory colleges at Cornell University in Ithaca are:

- New York State College of Agriculture and Life Sciences (established 1888; contract since 1904)
- New York State College of Human Ecology (established 1919; separate college since 1925)
- New York State School of Industrial and Labor Relations (established 1944)
- New York State College of Veterinary Medicine (established 1894)

Another statutory college, the New York State College of Forestry, was founded at Cornell University in 1898, but was closed in 1903 when a pending lawsuit led Gov. Odell to veto the appropriations bill that provided funding. However, forestry education was continued at Cornell as part of the College of Agriculture. The College of Forestry was later reestablished at Syracuse University in 1911.

Two of Cornell's current statutory colleges, the New York State College of Agriculture and Life Sciences and the New York State College of Human Ecology, existed as non-state-supported colleges, as the College of Agriculture and the School of Home Economics, respectively, before state legislation was enacted to make each a state-supported entity. The New York State College of Human Ecology and the New York State College of Veterinary Medicine trace their origins to Cornell's agriculture college. However, the College of Veterinary Medicine was actually the first statutory college in New York. The Hotel School started in 1922 as a department within Home Economics, but became a separate, endowed college in 1954.

The statutory colleges at Cornell grew out of Cornell's designation in 1865 as New York state's land grant college under the Morrill Act. Under the Morrill Act, Cornell received land scrip based on the population of the state, and the proceeds formed the basis of Cornell's initial endowment. Under the terms of the Cornell's 1865 charter from the Legislature, Cornell was obligated to teach agriculture, mechanical arts and military tactic. (Cornell was also obligated to provide free tuition to students from each assembly district.) By the 1890s, Cornell sought state funding to continue its mission in these areas, and the statutory colleges were formed as a vehicle for direct state funding. In addition, around the start of the 20th century, new federal laws provided land-grant colleges and their agricultural experiment stations and cooperative extension services with annual funding conditioned upon matching state funds. As a result, almost all of Cornell's land grant duties were transferred to its four statutory colleges, which receive such state funds through the present.

Academic programs can be transferred between the statutory college side and the host institution. For example, when private funding was sufficient to assure operation of the hotel administration program of the College of Home Economics, it was spun off as a separate School of Hotel Administration in 1950. The Department of Agricultural Economics in the College of Agriculture and Life Sciences (CALS) has evolved into an undergraduate business school. In 2016, it became a school shared between CALS and a new college of business. Students still have the benefit of in-state tuition despite this reorganization.

=== Syracuse University ===
The New York State College of Forestry was reestablished at Syracuse University (SU) in 1911, but was never technically a statutory college. Founded first as a unit within Syracuse University, in 1913 the College was chartered as an independent state institution called "The New York State College of Forestry at Syracuse University", with its own Board of Trustees.

In 1948, with the establishment of the State University of New York, the College became a specialized, doctoral-degree granting institution within the multi-campus SUNY system. In 1972, the College's name was changed to the State University of New York College of Environmental Science and Forestry (ESF); it remains administratively separate from Syracuse University. ESF students have full access to SU libraries and recreational facilities. The two institutions share a common schedule of courses, students at either institution may take courses at the other institution, and can apply for admission to concurrent degree and joint certificate programs. ESF students take part in joint commencement exercises in May (and receive diplomas with the seals of both Syracuse University and ESF), and ESF students may participate in all SU student activities except NCAA Division I intercollegiate sports.

The statutory colleges are not state-run; they are operated by a contracted university. Only two universities, Cornell University and Alfred University, currently are part of this system. However, the five existing statutory colleges have been affiliated with SUNY since its inception in 1948, but had no affiliation with any umbrella organization before 1948). Statutory college employees legally are employees of Cornell and Alfred universities, not employees of SUNY.

The State Education Law does give the SUNY Board of Trustees the following authority. The Trustees must approve Cornell's and Alfred's appointment of the deans and unit heads of the statutory colleges, and control of the level of state funding for the statutory colleges resides with SUNY. In addition to money allocated by SUNY, the colleges may be funded by tuition and fees; grants and contracts from state agencies; special state legislative funding; federal funding; and private donations.

The Education Law mandates a consolatory role for SUNY. The statutory college should consult with SUNY when it sets tuition rates. SUNY also exercises a "general supervision" over the statutory colleges. However, Cornell and Alfred have interpreted this to mean that SUNY does not have the right to create novel policies for the statutory colleges that are not explicitly stated in the Education Law. If there is a conflict between Cornell or Alfred and SUNY in regard to a policy or action that SUNY is requiring from Cornell or Alfred, it must be resolved by negotiation between the two parties, although there is the legal right of court appeal by either party if agreement cannot be reached. However, this legal option has never been used.

The state finances the construction of buildings for the statutory college programs, and New York State owns those buildings as well as the land beneath those buildings. Such construction is managed by the NYS University Construction Fund rather than by Cornell or Alfred.

Since statutory colleges at Cornell and Alfred receive significant state funding, tuition rates for statutory colleges and for endowed colleges are determined separately. 'In-state' residents attending a statutory college pay a separate reduced rate, in contrast to their 'out-of-state' counterparts' rates. When a student enrolled in a statutory college takes a class offered by an endowed college, the endowed college is reimbursed in a budget item called an "accessory instruction fee." At times, statutory college students who take more than their allotted credit hours from endowed colleges were required to pay such fees themselves. Similarly, at various times, a student who matriculates into a statutory college and later transfers to an endowed college has been required to pay the difference in tuition upon the transfer.

Statutory college employees are covered by a separate pension plan and have separate pay scales and fringe benefits than their endowed college counterparts. Most of the statutory college buildings and facilities are owned by New York state.

=== State University of New York and City University of New York ===
SUNY performs a fiduciary role for dispersal of state funds to the statutory units. This may require periodic audits of the use of state funds within the private universities.

There is some debate about whether the statutory colleges are "public" or "private, nonprofit" entities. Legally, they are private and nonprofit; Cornell and Alfred Universities are private, nonprofit institutions, a status which extends to all of these universities' components, which are not separate corporations. Also, the employees of the statutory colleges, as currently affirmed by court rulings, are private, nonprofit employees. An analogy to this relationship is a private, nonprofit health agency which, under contract with a government, regularly receives government money to operate a research institute; the whole private, nonprofit agency (including the research institute) still remains a private, nonprofit entity. New York State's Education Law also states that the statutory colleges do not operate as "state agencies." The fact that each of the statutory colleges contains "New York State" in their official names does not alter the private nature of the statutory colleges; however, the importance of state funding is an important factor in the private vs. statutory unit relationship.

There are two state-supported university systems in New York state: the State University of New York, which has degree-granting units throughout the state, and the City University of New York, which only has degree-granting units in New York City. New York state's statutory colleges are partners of SUNY and have no affiliation with CUNY.

Summary of statutory college relationship
Factor	Private U	Public U	NY statutory colleges	SU-ESF
Lower instate tuition	No	Yes	Yes	Yes
Separate board of trustees	Yes	Yes	No	Yes
Separate dorms	Yes	Yes	No	Yes
Separate intercollegiate teams	n/a	n/a	No	Yes
State constructs and maintains facilities	No	Yes	Yes	Yes
Funded by annual state appropriations	No	Yes	Yes	Yes
Degree from host institution	n/a	n/a	Yes	Yes
Separate admission process	Yes	Yes	Yes	Yes
SUNY role in budget and selecting administrative head	No	Yes	Yes	Yes

=== National Technical Institute for the Deaf ===
The National Technical Institute for the Deaf (NTID) is a constituent school of Rochester Institute of Technology (RIT), located in Rochester, New York. NTID offers programs — frequently in conjunction with RIT's other colleges/schools — tailored to deaf and hard-of-hearing students, and also offers programs to students who are not necessarily hearing-impaired but who wish to assist hearing-impaired individuals.

United States resident students enrolled in NTID receive a reduced tuition rate which is both lower than RIT's regular tuition rate, lower than the comparable tuition charged to NTID's International, non-U.S.-resident enrolled students.

NTID was created through U.S. federal legislation in 1965, and receives Federal funding to subsidize the lower, domestic tuition rate.

== Pennsylvania ==
In Pennsylvania, the Commonwealth System of Higher Education recognizes a state-related status, in which an institution is provided with state funds in exchange for offering tuition discounts to students who are residents of Pennsylvania. The state allocations account for less than 10 percent of the budgets of the four institutions, Lincoln University in Oxford, Pennsylvania State University, Temple University in Philadelphia, and the University of Pittsburgh in Pittsburgh, which remain academically and administratively independent of the state.

The University of Pennsylvania School of Veterinary Medicine receives support from the state and offers in-state tuition to students who are residents of Pennsylvania.

== Texas ==
Baylor College of Medicine (BCM) in Houston subsidizes the tuition of Texas residents, so they have a lower tuition rate than that charged to non-Texans who attend its M.D. program. This subsidy, intended to increase the number of physicians in Texas, was enacted in 1969, at which time the medical school became an autonomous entity in order to avoid legal conflicts arising from Baylor's affiliation with the Baptist General Convention of Texas. State support only allays the cost of tuition for in-state students, and the state does not assist BCM with significant ongoing funding for research or outreach/extension purposes.

== International universities ==
The University of St Andrews, in St Andrews, Scotland, has three units that are designated as colleges. Two of these colleges are designated as statutory colleges, which have ecclesiastical beginnings. One of these statutory colleges, United College, founded by a college merger in 1747, today exists as essentially a non-administrative entity kept for the sake of history and tradition. It houses the University's Faculties of Arts, Medicine, and Science.

The other statutory college, St Mary's College, St Andrews, founded in 1538, and also in St Andrews, is coexistent with the University's Faculty and School of Divinity. The remaining college, St Leonard's College, is designated as "non-statutory," has similar early beginnings, but was re-instituted in 1972 as a central point of administration for postgraduate students. (St Andrews students who are postgraduates, as well as the University's postdoctoral fellows and research staff, are automatically enrolled as members of St Leonard's College.)
