= Alfred University =

Private university in Alfred, New York, U.S.

- Motto: Fiat Lux (Latin)
- Motto in English: "Let There Be Light"
- Type: Private and statutory college
- Established: 1836; 190 years ago
- Academic affiliations: Space-grant
- Endowment: $203 million (2025)
- President: Mark Zupan
- Faculty: 152 full-time, 32 part-time (2023)
- Students: 1,843 (2023)
- Undergraduates: 1,422 (2023)
- Postgraduates: 421
- Location: Alfred, New York, United States; 42°15′20″N 77°47′15.1″W
- Campus: Rural, 232 acres (94 ha), plus another 400 acres (160 ha) of nearby recreational land
- Colors: Purple & gold
- Nickname: Saxons
- Website: alfred.edu

Alfred University is a private university in Alfred, New York, United States. It has a total undergraduate population of approximately 1,600 students. The university hosts the statutory New York State College of Ceramics, which includes The Inamori School of Engineering and the School of Art and Design.

== History ==
Alfred University was founded in 1836 as a non-sectarian select school by Seventh Day Baptists. Bethuel C. Church, a Seventh Day Baptist, organized a college in Alfred village and began teaching, receiving financial assistance from the Seventh Day Baptist Educational Society and with resources, in part, from "Female Educational Societies" of local churches. Unusual for the time, not only was the school co-educational but within its first 20 years enrolled its first African-American and Native American students. From its founding as a select school, the institution received a charter as Alfred Academy from the New York State Board of Regents in 1842. Focused initially on the education of teachers, the institution continued to grow.

In 1855, a curriculum was created for the Academic and Collegiate departments with courses divided into three areas: the classic, the scientific, and the program for women that included most subjects in the general curriculum. There was no theology course in the initial period; however, the desire to organize a theological seminary led the academy's Jonathan Allen, an early teacher and later second president, to apply for a license for a government accredited university. After resolving difficulties for more than two years, Allen received a charter as Alfred University from the New York State Legislature in March 1857. Years later the Department of Theology was created. Although preceded by the short-lived New York Central College, Alfred University is the oldest surviving co-educational college in New York and New England; and the oldest college in the United States to admit women to all or most of its programs of study rather than offering only female–specific programs for women.

In 1900, the New York State Legislature approved the formation of "a State School of Clay-Working and Ceramics" at Alfred University, with the intention of establishing a public college "to serve New York State industry and assist in developing New York State raw materials and assist its ceramic industry." The college has evolved into the New York State College of Ceramics at Alfred University and contains certain departments of both the School of Engineering and the School of Art and Design. The engineering curriculum includes the study of ceramics and glass, while the School of Art and Design provides art practice instruction in ceramics and glass. The College of Ceramics remains part of the State University of New York system, while Alfred University also maintains a College of Liberal Arts and Sciences and a College of Business in its private sector.

In 1908, the New York State Legislature approved the formation of the New York College of Agriculture at Alfred University. That college became autonomous in 1941 as a junior college, and, in 1948, became a member of the State University of New York system. While a separate and autonomous institution, Alfred State College, located on the opposite side of Main Street in the Village of Alfred, maintains close relations with Alfred University, and both institutions host an annual "Hot Dog Day" in the spring.

The origin of the name "Alfred" is uncertain. Residents of the town and students at the two schools believe that the town received its name in honor of Alfred the Great, king of the Saxons, although the first documented occurrence of this connection was in 1881, 73 years after the first record of the name being used to describe the geophysical area during assignments by the state legislature. State records which might have verified the connection between the Saxon king and the university were lost in a fire in 1911. Regardless of whether the connection is historically accurate, Alfred University has embraced King Alfred as a symbol of the school's educational values, and a statue of the king stands in the center of the campus quad.

Alfred University has hosted guest lecturers, artists and musicians including Frederick Douglass, Ralph Waldo Emerson and Ghostface Killah. In April 2000, Alfred University received national attention when freshman Eric Zuckerman orchestrated a campus visit from then–First Lady, Hillary Clinton, during her campaign for the United States Senate from New York.

In the 1990s, Alfred University, together with Corning Incorporated and the State of New York, began developing the Ceramic Corridor, an incubator project designed to take advantage of the emerging ceramics industry and to create new jobs. This industrial development program has focused on developing start-up industries between Corning, NY and Alfred, NY and includes business incubator facilities in Alfred and Corning. Since its initiation, the incubator facility in Alfred has joined The Western New York Incubator Network.

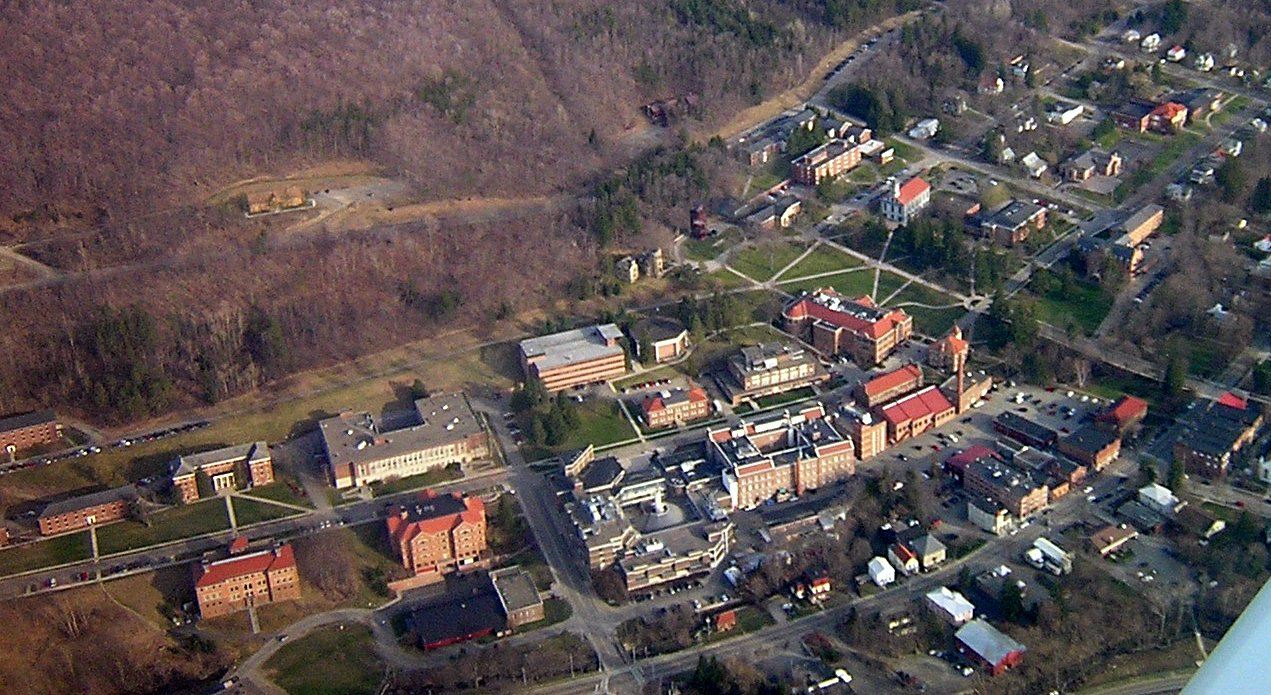
Aerial view of Alfred University, April 2006

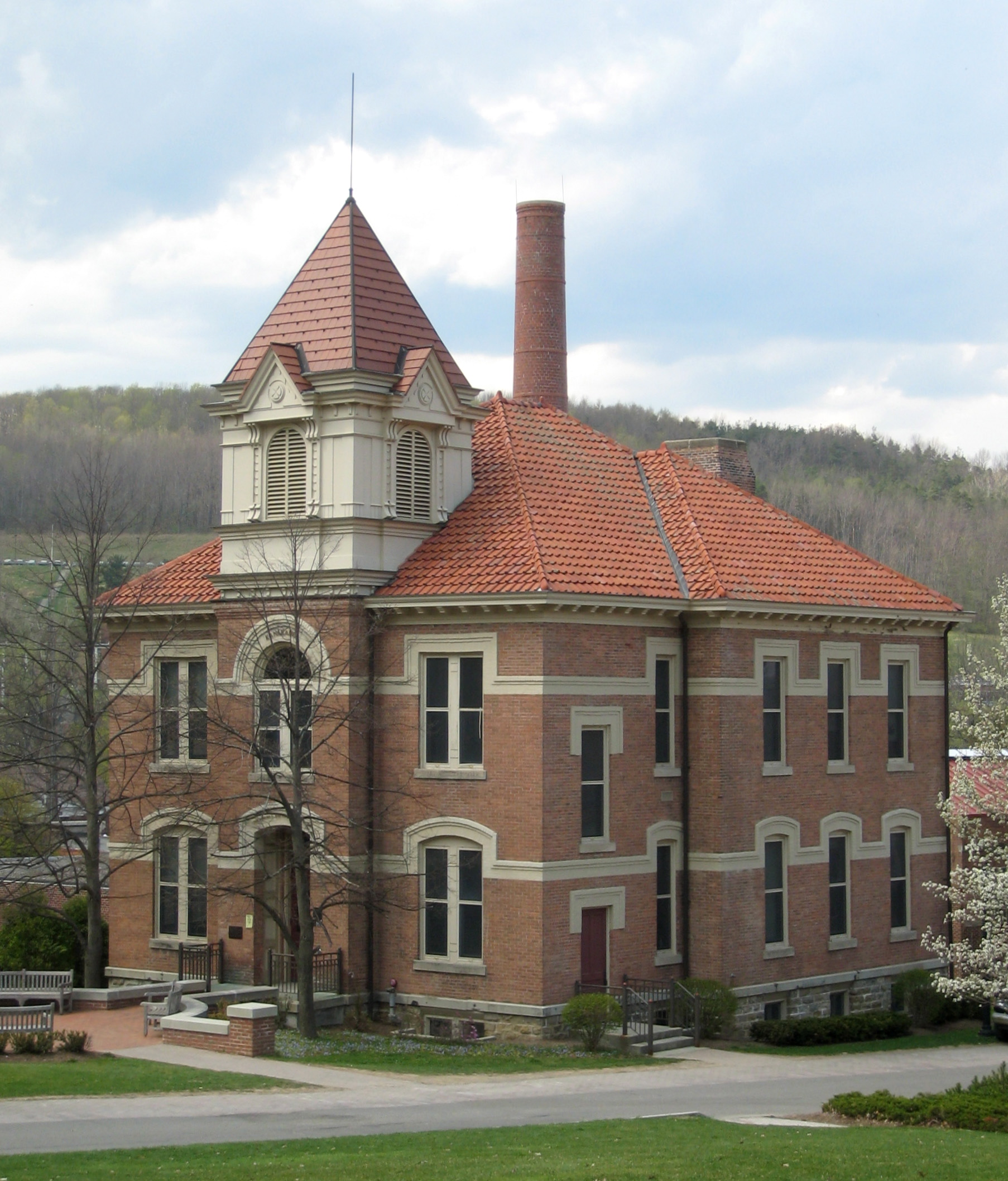
Originally built in 1884, Kanakadea Hall served as Alfred's schoolhouse until a large fire destroyed the tower and devastated the second floor in 1907. It was sold to Alfred University and repaired in 1908. The exterior has since been restored to its original appearance, although the interior has been fully modernized. The building now houses the Division of Human Studies.

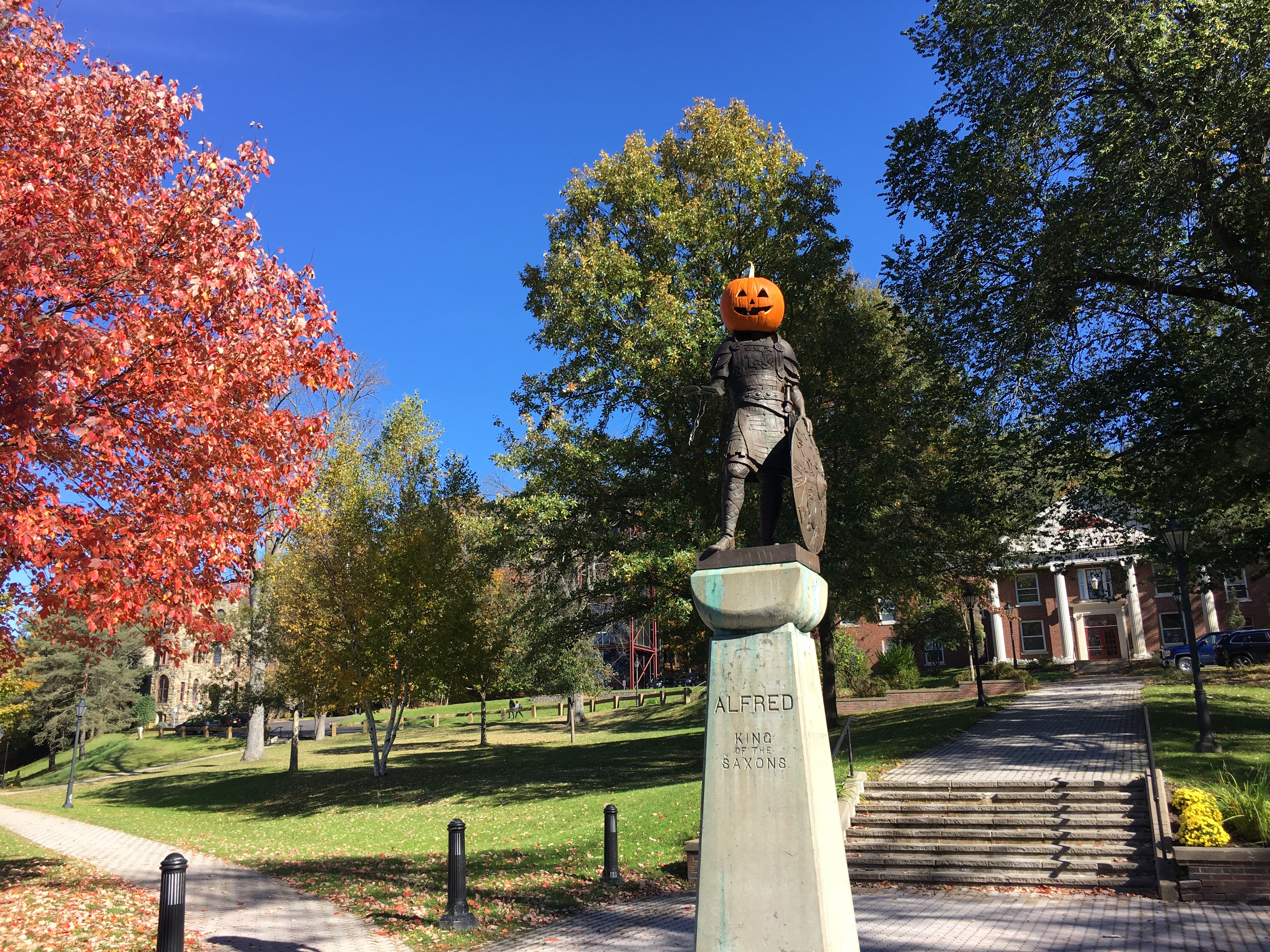
The statue of King Alfred the Great stands at the center of AU's quad, and is often decorated by students. In this picture, he has a Jack-o'-lantern on his head for Halloween 2019, leading to his temporary renaming as 'Pumpking Alfred'.

In 1971, the village of Alfred, where the university is located, became only the fourth municipality in the U.S. to ban employment discrimination based on sexuality. Amidst the dissolution of the AU Greek System, the Lambda Chi Alpha fraternity chapter at Alfred University led a successful effort to ban discrimination based on religion, age, disability, and sexual orientation in the constitution of the 210 chapter international fraternity in 2002.

Alfred University's ranking by U.S. News & World Report in its 2021 edition of Best Colleges is Regional Universities North, #45, while in 2019 the university had an acceptance rate of 66% with the middle 50% of students admitted having an SAT score between 940 and 1180 or an ACT score between 20 and 27.

== Events and culture ==
=== Mascot ===
Alfred University's athletic teams became known as The Saxons in 1929, but did not institute an official mascot when the moniker was selected.

In 1940, two Kappa Psi Upsilon brothers, James Lippke and Walter Lawrence, developed a character named Lil Alf to be used on their fraternity house's signs during football games. In his original design, Lil Alf was a knight in shining armor, simplified to a small cartoonish form in a 1948 redesign.

Lil Alf was not formally adopted as a campus mascot, with many sports teams complaining that he was "too cute and not fierce enough." The use of his image was formally banned on official publications by the university's Visual Identity Standards document. In spite of opposition, his image remained ubiquitous through the 2000s and was common on unofficial sports signs and clothing.

In 2013 the university introduced Lil Alf as its official mascot. He was redesigned to feature a somewhat more historically accurate armor and helmet in Alfred University's purple and gold.

=== The Black Knight ===
The Black Knight has been a part of Alfred University folklore since the early 1900s. The relic was originally part of a parlor stove in a classroom in Kanakadea Hall. When the stove was discarded, the figure was claimed by the Class of 1908 as their mascot. They passed it on to the Class of 1910, thus causing a "war of possession" between the even and odd numbered classes. Many times over the years it disappeared and re-appeared on campus. In 2005 it was transferred to a glass case in the Powell Campus Center, along with a plaque describing its history. However, after only a few months, the glass enclosure was destroyed in the middle of the night and the Black Knight stolen.

=== Hot Dog Day ===
Hot Dog Day, one of the largest yearly gatherings in Alfred, was first organized in 1972 by Mark O'Meara and Eric Vaughn as a way to bring the community together, raise money for local charities, and improve the reputations of campus Greek life. Since then the event has been organized and run by Alfred University and Alfred State College. From 2014 through 2022 the festival was held on alternating campuses, but in 2023 it resumed its original location on Main Street, Alfred. The event usually features live music, a soapbox derby, vendors, and carnival games for local children.

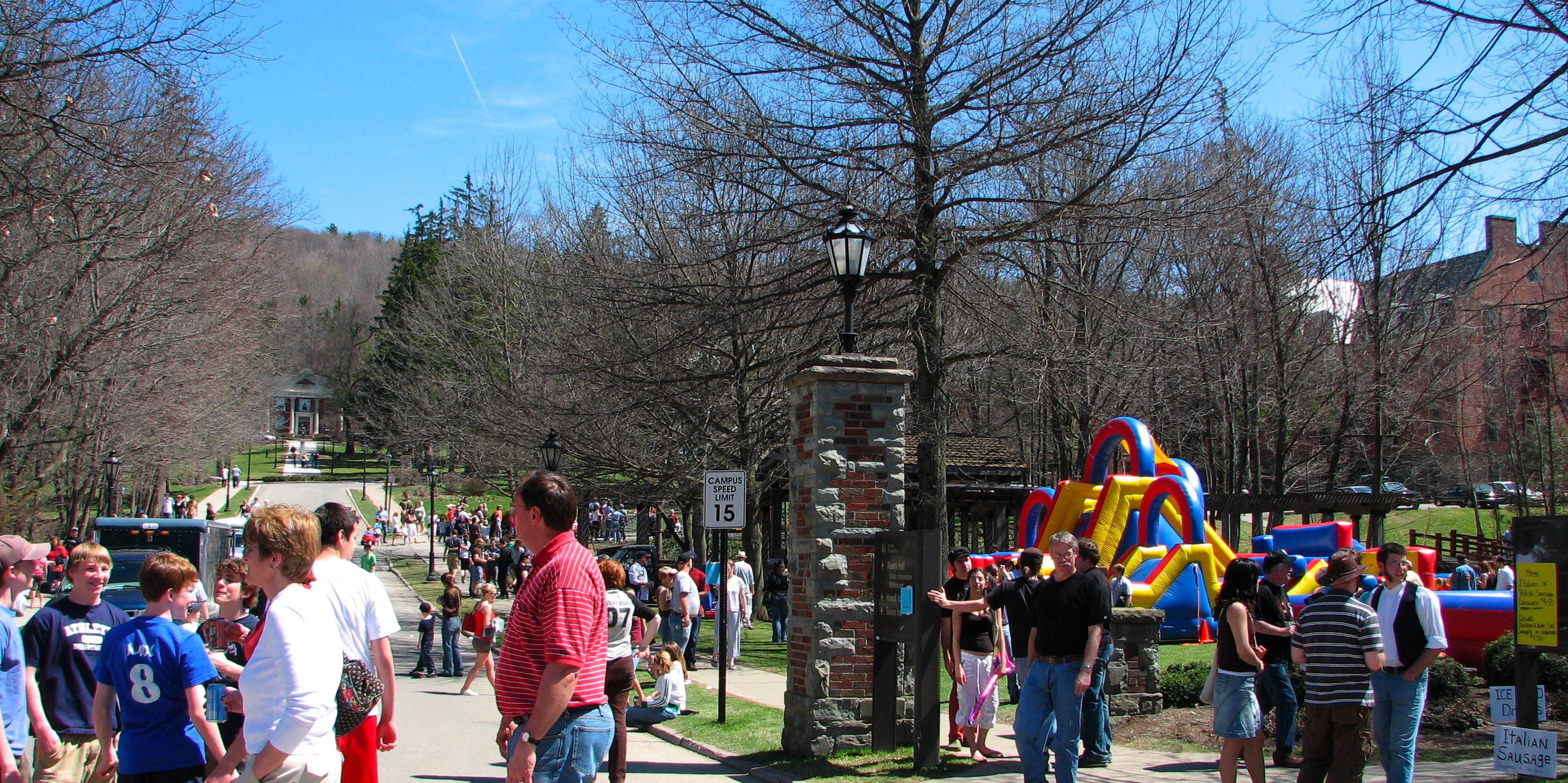
Main Street and part of AU during Hot Dog Day

=== In popular culture ===
Alfred University was mentioned on Saturday Night Live once in 1975 by host and Alfred University alumnus Robert Klein. When Klein hosted SNL again in 1977, he talked at length about Alfred University in his monologue.

In April, 2020, an episode of the game show Jeopardy featured Alfred University's honors course on maple syrup in a question for the category of "Unique College Courses".

== Campus ==
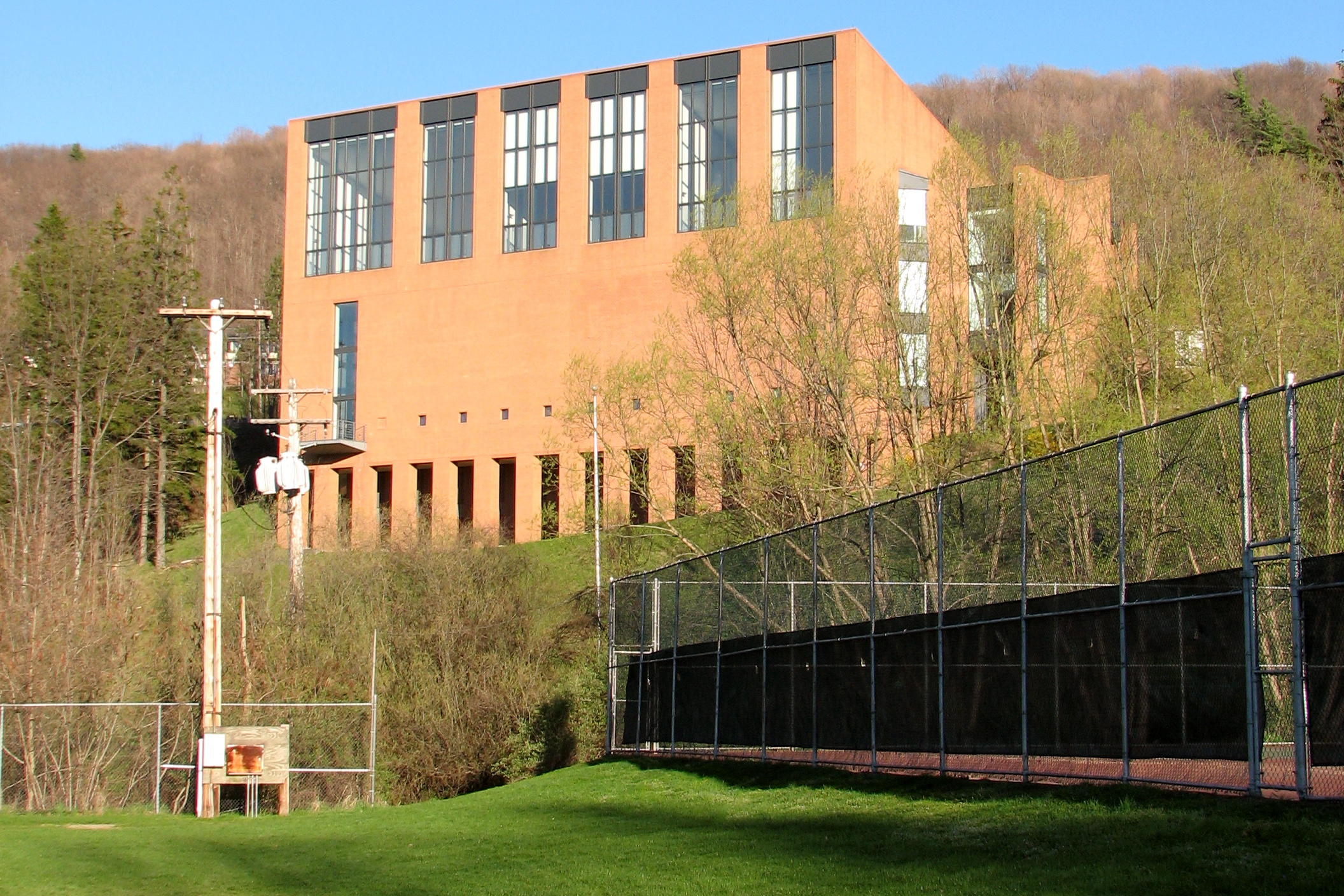
The Miller Performing Arts Center

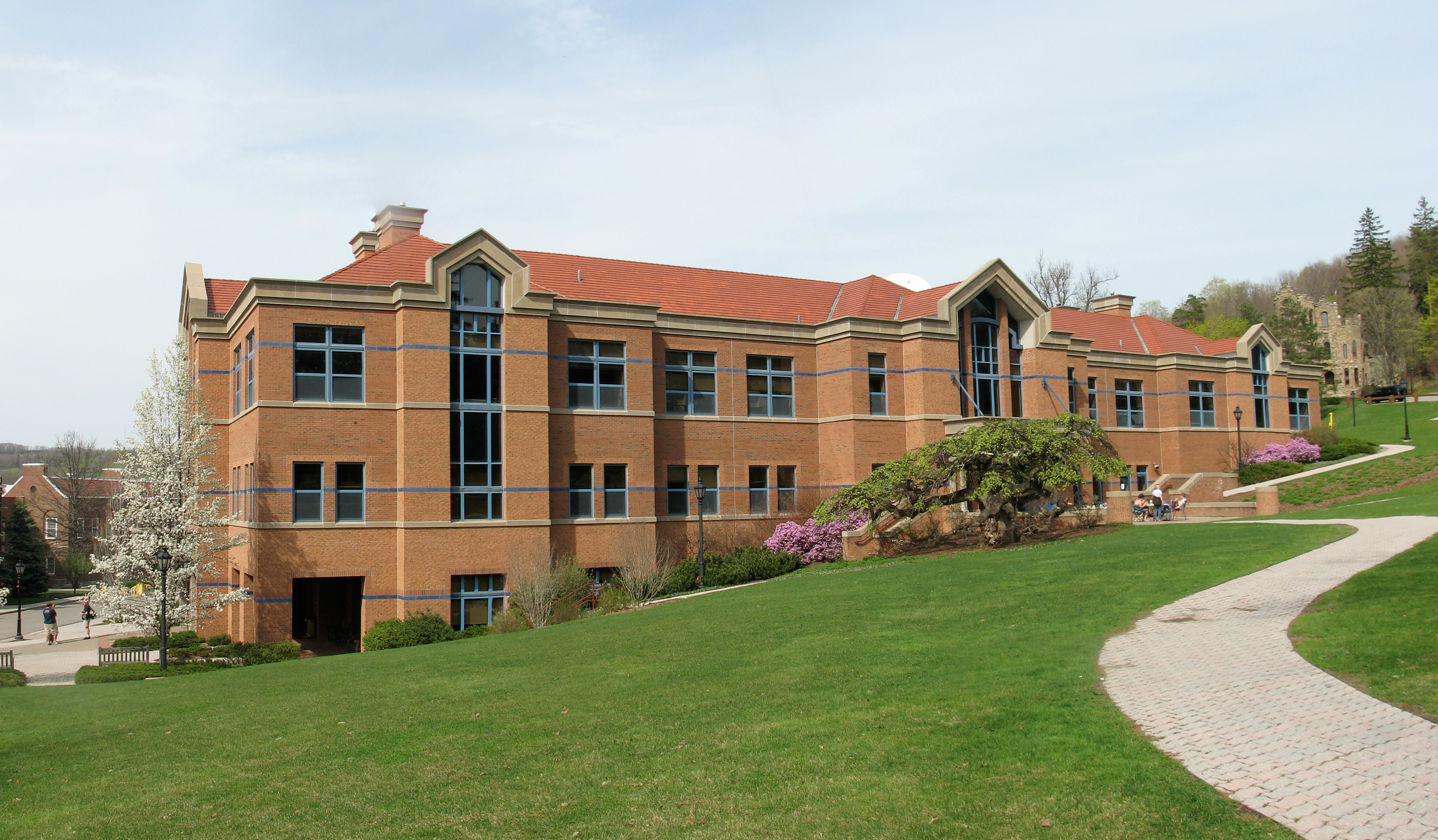
The Powell Campus Center

There are two libraries on Alfred's campus, the Herrick Memorial Library, which primarily serves the private colleges, and the Scholes Library, which primarily serves the New York State College of Ceramics. The Alfred Ceramic Art Museum has a collection of 8,000 ceramic objects, including both ancient and modern ceramic art and craft.

Alfred has an astronomy program with the 7-telescope Stull Observatory, which has one of the largest optical telescopes in New York state. Asteroid 31113 Stull was named for physics professor John Stull, who helped establish the observatory in 1966.

The Bromley-Daggett Equestrian Center, located at the Maris Cuneo Equine Park, was constructed in 2005. It hosts equine classes, an intramural equestrian team, varsity and JV for both English and Western disciplines, clinics, and horse shows. Stalls are available for boarding horses by university students. The facility has an indoor arena of 16000 ft^{2} and lighted outdoor arenas of 28,800 and 10,800 sq ft (2,680 and 1,000 m^{2}); the entire property consists of 400 acres (1.6 km^{2}) of land.

The Miller Performing Arts Center was dedicated in 1995.

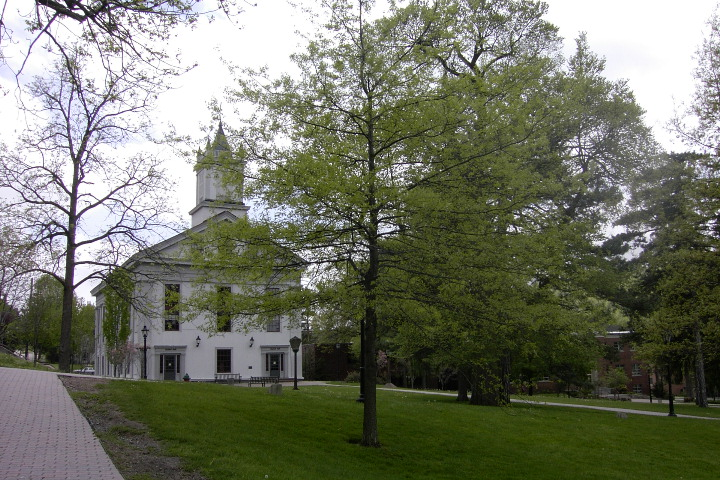
Alumni Hall

Alfred University was once associated with the Seventh Day Baptist Church, until 1945 all presidents were admitted from among the seventh day Baptists, and had a school of theology. Formerly the campus chapel, Alumni Hall is now used primarily to house the Admissions and Financial Aid Departments, and has a place on the National Register of Historic Places. In the mid-1980s, Alumni Hall was preserved through a restoration effort.

AU's Davis Memorial Carillon, erected in 1937 as a tribute to longtime president Boothe C. Davis, can occasionally be heard while on campus. The bells of the carillon, purchased from Antwerp, were thought to be the oldest bells in the western hemisphere. Later research (2004) showed that the bells were of a more recent vintage and that Alfred had been the victim of a fraud. On the brighter side, the non-historic nature of the bells allows the university to replace those that have poor tonal quality. Besides the resident carillonneur, guest carillonneurs have in the past visited and played during the summer.

== Academics ==
=== Colleges and schools ===
Alfred University has 47 majors across its four colleges and schools. Alfred's four private colleges are The College of Liberal Arts and Sciences, The College of Professional Studies, The Inamori School of Engineering, and The Graduate School. The School of Business is part of The College of Professional Studies.

The New York State College of Ceramics (NYSCC) consists of the School of Art and Design, with its own dean, and four state-supported materials programs cross-organized within Alfred University's School of Engineering. The College of Ceramics is functioning technically as a "holding entity" for the fiscal support of the state programs and the NYSCC mission. The unit head assists with budget preparation for the two aforementioned AU schools and the NYSCC-affiliated Scholes Library of Ceramics (part of the campuswide, unified AU library system), and acts in a liaison role to SUNY.

The School of Art and Design, technically a sub-unit of the College of Ceramics but autonomously run with its own dean, is further subdivided into divisions. A visit to the school in 2009 led media historian Siegfried Zielinski to state that Alfred is "the center of alchemy for the 21st century." Alfred's School of Engineering (also autonomously run with its own dean) currently has four state-supported programs and two privately endowed programs.

=== Partnerships ===
Alfred University maintains a research agreement with the China University of Geosciences in Wuhan. Alfred University also hosted a Confucius Institute supported by the China University of Geosciences since 2009. The partnerships gained attention in 2023 when the United States House Select Committee on Strategic Competition between the United States and the Chinese Communist Party announced a probe into them over national security concerns. In June 2023, Alfred University announced that it was closing its Confucius Institute but did not state that it would end its partnership with the China University of Geosciences.

=== Rankings ===
For its 2022–2023 ranking, U.S. News & World Report ranked Alfred University tied for #48 in Regional Universities North.

== Museums and galleries ==
Alfred University and The New York State College of Ceramics (NYSCC) are associated with five galleries: Alfred Ceramic Art Museum, The Cohen Center for the Arts Gallery, The Fosdick-Nelson Gallery, Robert C. Turner Gallery, and Institute for Electronic Art's (IEA) John Woods Studios. Other exhibition spaces for undergraduate and graduate students to show work include the Sculpture Dimensional Studies Exhibition Spaces (the Cube, the Box and the Cell Space), the Printmaking Critique Room, Flex Space, the New Deal, and Rhodes Room.

=== The Robert C. Turner Gallery ===
Alfred University's student-run gallery, the Robert C. Turner Gallery, was refurbished in 2011 during a building improvement project. The gallery was once a unique space that hosted undergraduate experimental shows with a loose criteria that encouraged experimentation. The gallery now has two floors; the main space and the catwalk, which also has a "black box" interactive space for expanded (electronic) media. This gallery space is named after internationally acclaimed artist and Alfred University alumnus, Robert C. Turner, a former professor of ceramic art at Alfred University with a sixty-year-long career in ceramics.

=== IEA John Wood Studios ===
NYSCC is host to the John Wood Studios of the Institute of Electronic Arts (IEA) within the School of Art and Design (SoAD), NYSCC which offers a residency program for up to two weeks for international artists.

== Student life ==
=== Current student organizations ===
As of 2020, Alfred has over 80 student organizations and clubs. There are three main media organizations on campus; AUTV, the Fiat Lux newspaper, and the WALF 89.7FM radio station. The student-run yearbook, the Kanakadea, ceased publication in 2014. Notable extracurricular clubs include the Student Activities Board, Forest People, and Art Force Five.

AU has been granted chapters of a number of honor societies, including Phi Beta Kappa (the Alpha Gamma chapter of New York, granted in 2004), Phi Kappa Phi, and Alpha Lambda Delta; Alfred also has chapters of the service societies Alpha Phi Omega and Omicron Delta Kappa. Other honor societies include Alpha Iota Delta, Beta Gamma Sigma, Delta Mu Delta, Omicron Delta Epsilon, Pi Gamma Mu, Pi Mu Epsilon (the Alpha Iota chapter of New York, chartered in 2002), Pi Sigma Alpha, Sigma Tau Delta, Tau Beta Pi, Phi Alpha Theta, Phi Sigma Iota, Psi Chi, Keramos, and the Financial Management Association.

=== Greek social organizations ===
Fraternities and sororities were established at Alfred University for nearly 100 years prior to 2002, when they were discontinued, partially in response to the death of Zeta Beta Tau (ZBT) fraternity member Benjamin Klein under suspicious circumstances and charges of gross negligence on behalf of the fraternity.

In 1978, prior to Klein's death, student Chuck Stenzel died in a hazing-related incident at Alfred's Klan Alpine fraternity. After Stenzel's death, his mother, Eileen Stevens, created a lobbying organization to increase awareness of hazing and promote anti-hazing laws, as documented in Hank Nuwer's book "Broken Pledges" and a later TV movie of the same name (in which Alfred was not named for legal reasons). Stevens later served as an advisor to Alfred on hazing-related issues, and received an honorary doctorate from the school in 1999.

During the summer of 2002, all Greek social organizations lost recognition after an in-depth analysis of the Alfred University Greek system by an eight-member task force appointed by the board of trustees. More than 50% of the task force were themselves members of a fraternity or sorority while in college, and 82% of the board of trustees are Alfred University alumni.

While Alfred University has banned fraternities and sororities, Alfred State College has not, and these organizations remain active within the village of Alfred.

=== Athletics ===
Alfred teams participate as a member of the National Collegiate Athletic Association's Division III, with the exception of alpine skiing which is governed by the USCSA and the equestrian team which is governed by the IHSA. The Saxons are a member of the Empire 8 Athletic Conference (Empire 8). They compete in the following sports: alpine skiing, basketball, cross country, equestrian, football, lacrosse, soccer, swimming and diving, tennis, and track and field, women's volleyball, and women's softball.

On July 15, 2020, due to the COVID-19 pandemic, the Empire 8 Conference postponed all fall sports. Sports have since resumed operating as normal.

== See also ==
- List of university art museums and galleries in New York State
