= Castellani Art Museum =

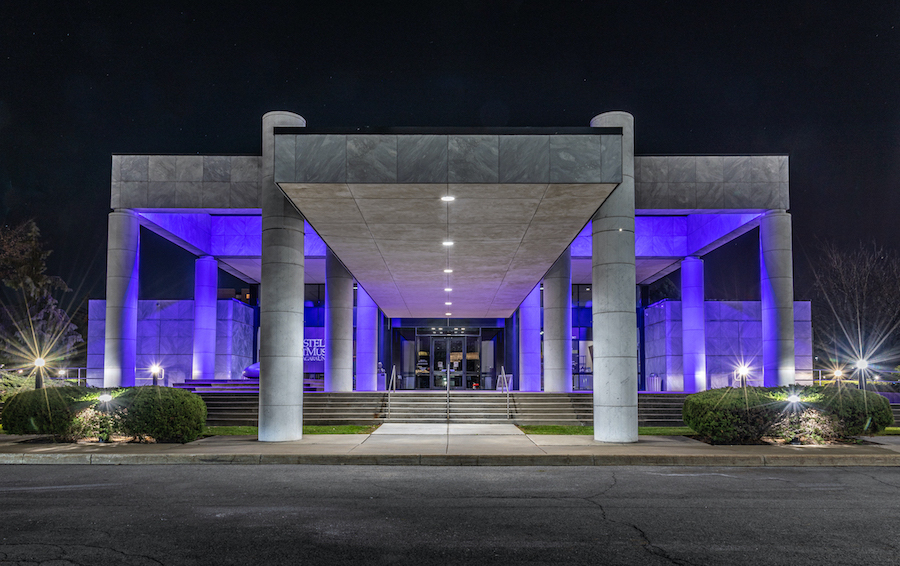
- Established: 1978
- Location: 5795 Lewiston Road; Lewiston, New York
- Coordinates: 43.139210°N 79.039780°W
- Type: Art museum
- Collections: Contemporary art, folk art
- Owner: Niagara University
- Website: www.castellaniartmuseum.org

The Castellani Art Museum of Niagara University is an art museum centrally located on the University's main campus in the town of Lewiston, New York, United States. The museum features exhibitions of nationally known and emerging contemporary artists and traditional folk arts.

== History ==
The Castellani Art Museum collection was initiated in 1976 by Armand J. Castellani to encourage the study and love of art and to improve cultural understanding by forming a significant collection for Niagara University students and the Western New York public.

The original museum, known as the Buscaglia-Castellani Art Gallery, was built in 1978 and was located off campus. The Gallery housed a permanent collection of about 300 pieces. In 1990, the museum was renamed the Castellani Art Museum and a new building was constructed on campus. The building was designed by Thomas Moscati and boasts seven different gallery spaces, indoor and outdoor sculpture courts, a museum shop, offices, and storage and preparation spaces.

The museum is also used for educational purposes. The Niagara University Fine Arts Program has studio and classroom spaces in the museum for students as well. The Museum is dedicated to facilitating art educational programs for students of the University, as well as other schools in the area and cultural organizations. Docent and volunteer programs are offered to any interested member of the community.

Niagara University also offers a degree program that was developed collaboratively with the former Director of the Castellani Art Museum (Kate Koperski) and the former Curator of Education (Marian Granfield).

In 2016, the Museum showcased a Folk Arts exhibition that explores the details and intimate meanings of Haudenosaunee, Wabanaki and Chippewa beadwork through both historic and contemporary Native American works.

== Collection ==
The museum owns a permanent collection of over 5,700 art works, which includes paintings, prints, photographs, drawings and sculptures, most from the 19th-century, modern and contemporary movements. Works in the collection include:

- 19th century works of art including European artists Daumier, the impressionist Armand Guillaumin, and American landscapists John Henry Twachtman, Edward Bierstadt, Jasper Francis Cropsey, Thomas Hill, and Edward Henry Potthast;
- Early 20th century European artists including Utrillo, Georges Rouault, Amedeo Modigliani, Pablo Picasso, Moholy-Nagy, Ivan Puni, Salvador Dalí, Roberto Matta, and American artists Stanton Macdonald-Wright, Milton Avery, Charles E. Burchfield, and Bradley Walker Tomlin;
- Mid-20th century artists such as Robert Motherwell, Willem de Kooning, Romare Bearden, Jensen, Barbara Hepworth, Joan Mitchell, Neith Nevelson, Joan Miró, Andy Warhol, and Rauschenberg;
- Contemporary artists of the last two decades, including Basquiat, Jonathan Borofsky, Lesley Dill, Gornick, Susan Rothenberg, Murray, Sam Gilliam, Judy Pfaff, Jedd Garet, David Salle, Lynda Benglis, Andy Warhol, Keith Haring, and Georg Baselitz.

Armand and Eleanor Castellani, both avid art collectors since the 1960s, donated much of their personal collection to the Castellani Art Museum. The Castellanis have also donated valuable works to the Burchfield Penney Art Center, and the Albright-Knox Art Gallery in Buffalo, New York.

== See also ==
- List of university art museums and galleries in New York State
