= List of counties in the Susquehanna River watershed =

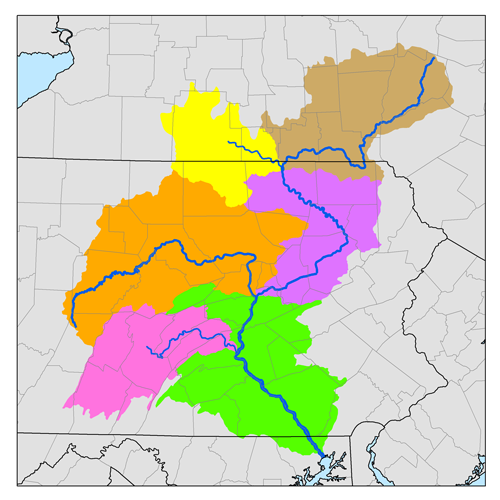

The Susquehanna River is in the U.S. States of Maryland, Pennsylvania and New York. As of 2000, the Susquehanna drainage basin population was 3,968,635. Its total area is 27,486 square miles (71,188 km^{2}), and in 2000 612 square miles (1,585 km^{2}) were developed, 8,041 square miles (20,826 km^{2}) were used for agriculture, 18,181 square miles (47,089 km^{2}) were forested, 27,486 square miles (71,188 km^{2}) were open water, 127 square miles (329 km^{2}) were wetland, and 201 square miles (521 km^{2}) were barren. By area, the Susquehanna basin accounts for 45% of Pennsylvania, 11% of New York, and 3% of Maryland . The drainage basin is divided into six subbasins by the Susquehanna River Basin Commission. These are:

- Lower Susquehanna (green on the map at right)
- Juniata River (pink)
- West Branch Susquehanna River (orange)
- Middle Susquehanna (purple)
- Chemung River (Yellow)
- Upper Susqehanna River (brown)

== Lower Susquehanna River ==

Maryland Counties

- Baltimore County
- Carroll County
- Cecil County
- Harford County

Pennsylvania Counties

- Adams County
- Berks County
- Centre County
- Chester County
- Columbia County
- Cumberland County
- Dauphin County
- Franklin County
- Juniata County
- Lancaster County
- Lebanon County
- Mifflin County
- Northumberland County
- Perry County
- Schuylkill County
- Snyder County
- Union County
- York County

== Juniata River ==

Pennsylvania Counties

- Bedford County
- Blair County
- Cambria County
- Centre County
- Dauphin County
- Franklin County
- Fulton County
- Huntingdon County
- Franklin County
- Fulton County
- Juniata County
- Mifflin County
- Perry County
- Somerset County
- Snyder County

== West Branch Susquehanna River ==

Pennsylvania Counties

- Blair County
- Bradford County
- Cambria County
- Cameron County
- Centre County
- Clearfield County
- Clinton County
- Columbia County
- Elk County
- Indiana County
- Jefferson County
- Lycoming County
- McKean County
- Montour County
- Northumberland County
- Potter County
- Sullivan County
- Tioga County
- Union County
- Wyoming County

== Middle Susquehanna River ==

Pennsylvania Counties

- Bradford County
- Carbon County
- Columbia County
- Lackawanna County
- Luzerne County
- Lycoming County
- Montour County
- Northumberland County
- Schuylkill County
- Sullivan County
- Susquehanna County
- Tioga County
- Wayne County
- Wyoming County

== Chemung River ==

Pennsylvania Counties

- Bradford County
- Potter County
- Tioga County

New York Counties

- Allegany County
- Chemung County
- Livingston County
- Ontario County
- Schuyler County
- Stueben County
- Tioga County
- Yates County

== Upper Susquehanna River ==

Pennsylvania Counties

- Bradford County
- Susquehanna County
- Wayne County

New York Counties

- Broome County
- Chemung County
- Chenango County
- Cortland County
- Delaware County
- Herkimer County
- Madison County
- Oneida County
- Onondaga County
- Otsego County
- Schoharie County
- Schuyler County
- Tioga County
- Tompkins County
