= Scholes Library =

Coordinates: 42.256432°N 77.788532°W

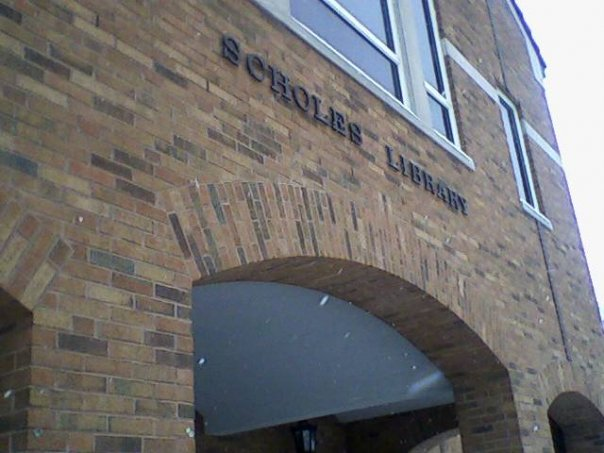
Scholes Library

Scholes Library is a special academic library located at Alfred University that serves the New York State College of Ceramics, Inamori School of Engineering, as well as for the greater international arts and sciences research community. The library has an extensive collection of materials on ceramic art, science, engineering and technology, as well as extensive holdings in photography, sculpture, art history, glass art, electronic media and other areas of art and design. A Special Collections room houses original theses, rare books and artists' books. Other facilities include a 24-hour study room; an extensive slide library; audiovisual and computer data projection facilities for individual or group use; and original documents and photographs in the archives.

Scholes Library is located at Alfred University, in Alfred, New York and is named for renowned glass scientist and educator, Samuel R. Scholes. It was formally established in 1947 to support the curriculum and research programs of the New York State College of Ceramics. Today, Scholes Library serves as an international resource. From its humble beginnings as the “New York State School of Clay Working and Ceramics” to the college’s present status as a leader in materials research, and fine arts education, a trail of documents and artifacts are collected and made available to researchers throughout the world. According to their website, their current holdings include 100,000 bound volumes, 60,000 government research reports, 160,000 slides, and a variety of other materials.

== Special Collections ==
Scholes Library, Special Collections has rare and unique materials that include original College graduate theses and dissertations, signed copies of publications by College faculty, and a collection of Artists’ Books, and visual art. It is located directly across from their Circulation Desk and is available for viewing specified materials when a Reference Librarian is on duty only. Their hours are always subject to change and all patrons and visitors to Special Collections are required to register before accessing the collection.
