= Frances Lehman Loeb Art Center =

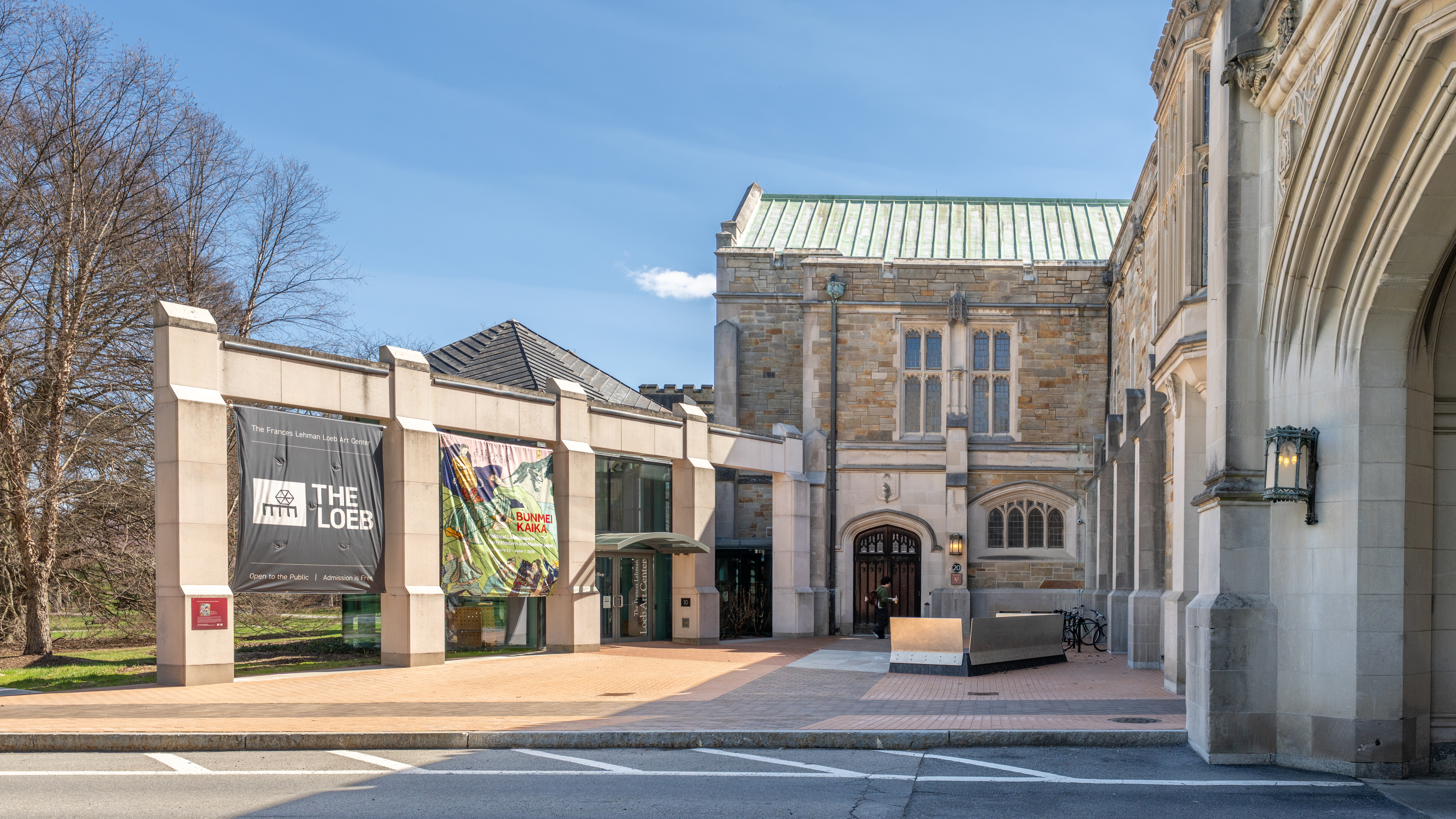
- Entrance and courtyard

- Location in New York State
- Established: 1864
- Location: 124 Raymond Ave, Poughkeepsie, New York
- Coordinates: 41.6862°N 73.8974°W
- Type: Art museum
- Owner: Vassar College
- Website: vassar.edu/theloeb

The Frances Lehman Loeb Art Center, commonly known as the Loeb, is a teaching museum, major art repository, and exhibition space on the campus of Vassar College, in Poughkeepsie, New York, United States. It was founded in 1864 as the Vassar College Art Gallery. It displays works from antiquity to contemporary times. Vassar was the first college or university in the country to include an art museum as part of its original plan. The current 36,000-square-foot (3,300 m^{2}) facility was designed by César Pelli and named in honor of the new building’s primary donor Frances Lehman Loeb, a member of the Class of 1928.

The Lehman Loeb Art Center’s collections chart the history of art from antiquity to the present and comprise over 18,000 works, including paintings, sculptures, drawings, prints, photographs, textiles, and glass and ceramic wares. Teaching students and working as an important tangible complement to the curriculum is the main focus of the collection. Notable holdings include the Warburg Collection of Old Master prints, an important group of Hudson River School paintings given by Matthew Vassar at the college’s inception, and a wide range of works by major European and American twentieth-century painters.

== Significant collections ==
At the time of its founding, the collection's largest holding was a large group of Hudson River School paintings. These were donated by Matthew Vassar himself who purchased them from the Rev. Elias Magoon of Albany, New York. The collection, named for Magoon, includes the work of Frederic Church, Asher Durand, and Joseph Mallord William Turner.

The Warburg Collection of Old Master prints features works by Albrecht Dürer and Rembrandt van Rijn. They were given to Vassar's collection in 1941 by Felix Warburg.

Perhaps the greatest strength of the art collection housed by the Frances Lehman Loeb Art Center is its 20th-century works by European and American artists. Included in this group are significant works by Pablo Picasso, Balthus, Arthur Dove, Ian Hornak, Alfred Stieglitz and Georgia O'Keeffe, Francis Bacon, Jackson Pollock, Alexander Calder, Nancy Graves, and Marsden Hartley.

The museum is home to the mummified remains of an ancient Egyptian by the name of Shepen-Min, the son of Pahat, who is housed at the Berkshire Museum.

In November 2016, the gallery opened the Hoene Hoy Photography gallery on the second floor, named after Anne Hoene Hoy from the class of 1963.

== Architecture ==
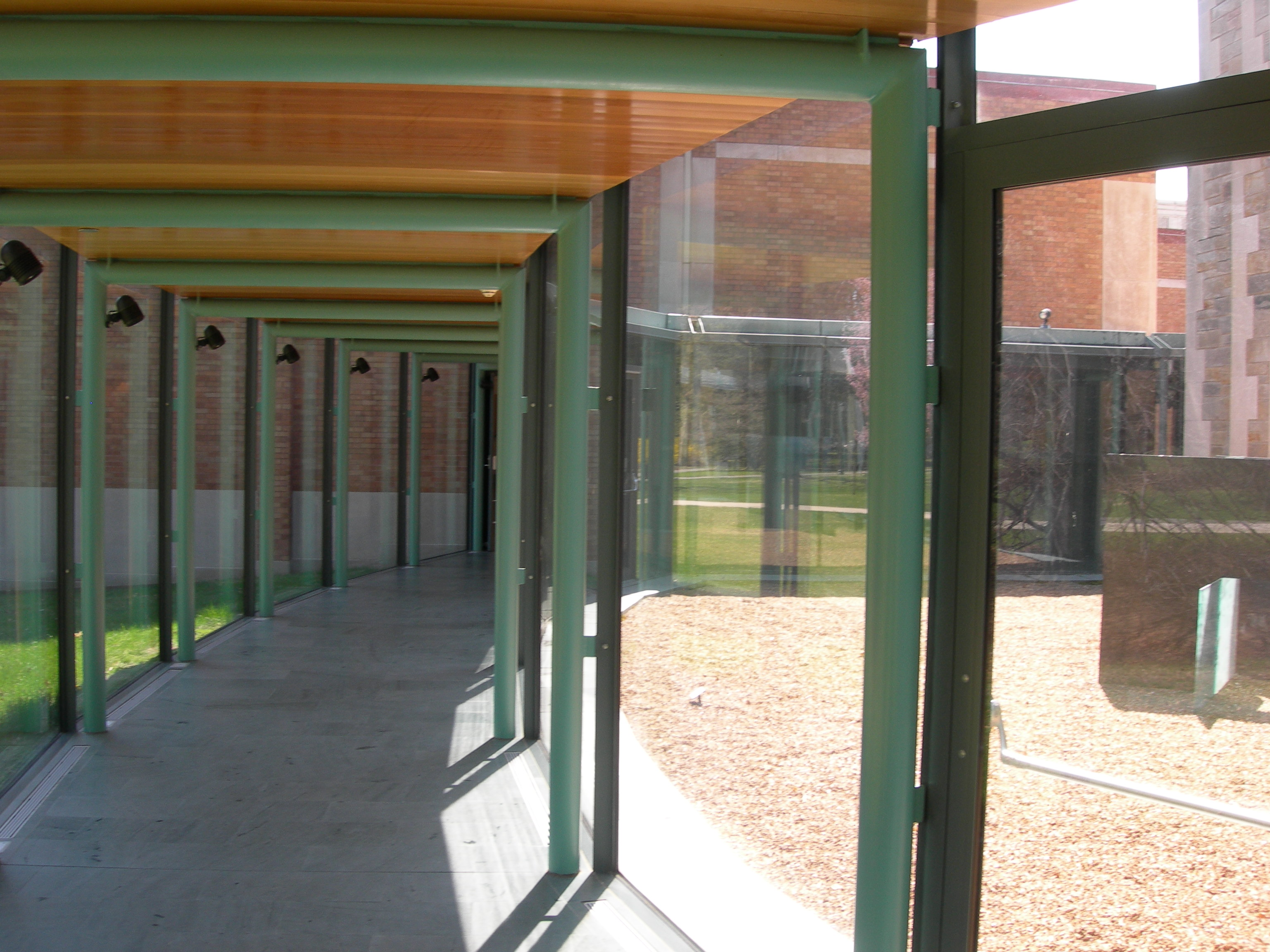
Curved glass entry

The art center is housed in a structure designed by Argentine architect César Pelli. It features a curved glass entry, and rooms separating covering Asian; Greek and Roman; Medieval, Renaissance, and Baroque; 19th-century American; 19th-century European; and the 20th century. Changing print and photographic exhibitions are housed in a separate room.

== See also ==
- European painting
- List of university art museums and galleries in New York State
