= Plattsburgh State Art Museum =

Coordinates: 44.693098°N 73.466687°W

The Plattsburgh State Art Museum is part of the State University of New York at Plattsburgh in Plattsburgh, New York. The museum's concept of a "museum without walls", originated by French art theorist André Malraux, is to display its art collection around the university's campus. The permanent collection consists of over 4,600 works of art and artifacts, ranging from antiquities to contemporary art and sculpture. The collections are displayed in three main galleries, a sculpture court, and exhibition areas throughout the campus.

== Exhibition spaces ==
=== Rockwell Kent Gallery ===
Located in the Feinberg Library, the Rockwell Kent Gallery is a permanent exhibition space for works done by artist Rockwell Kent, including painting, prints, drawings, dinnerware, and photographs, as well as displays of his personal items. The Plattsburgh State Art Museum owns one of the most completed collections of Rockwell Kent's work in the United States.

The gallery also displays works from the college's permanent collection, as well as changing exhibits of Kent's work.

=== Burke Gallery ===
The Burke Gallery is the museum's main space for changing exhibitions, including works from the museum's collections, works by contemporary artists, traveling exhibitions, faculty and student works. It is located in the Myers Fine Arts Building.

=== Myers Lobby Gallery ===
The Myers Lobby Gallery is located at the entrance of the Myers Fine Arts building and offers exhibitions that are student installations from the Studio Arts Program.

=== Nina Winkel Sculpture Court ===
Located in the Myers Fine Arts Building, the Nina Winkel Sculpture Court features sculptures in terracotta, stone, bronze and copper done by Nina Winkel (1905-1990). It is the largest permanent exhibition devoted to the work of one woman in the United States.

=== Plattsburgh Sculpture Park ===
This project is an outgoing development of a collection of monumental sculpture installations located around the campus. The Sculpture Terrace is an outside location in which presents annual or biannual exhibitions of contemporary sculpture. Most of the artwork on display on campus were created by students attending.
