= Phi Sigma Iota =

Honor society for foreign language students

- ΦΣΙ
- Founded: 1922; 104 years ago Allegheny College
- Type: Honor
- Affiliation: ACHS
- Status: Active
- Emphasis: Foreign languages and literatures
- Scope: International
- Colors: Purple and White
- Symbol: Chaplet of ivy, Five-pointed star
- Publication: The Forum
- Chapters: 180
- Members: 50,000+ lifetime
- Headquarters: 520 North Main Street, Box 30; Meadville, Pennsylvania 16335-3902; United States
- Website: phisigmaiota.org

Phi Sigma Iota (ΦΣΙ) is an international honor society for students of modern and classical foreign languages and literatures. Its primary objectives are the recognition of ability and attainments in languages and literature and the promotion of a sentiment of amity between cultures with differing languages.

The society was established at Allegheny College in 1922. Phi Sigma Iota is a member of the Association of College Honor Societies, and awards scholarships to undergraduates and grants to graduate students.

== History ==
Dr. Henry Ward Church of the Department of Languages founded Phi Sigma Iota in 1922 at Allegheny College, along with other members of the department and advanced students. Its purpose is:

The recognition of outstanding scholarship and attainment in foreign languages, linguistics, literature, cultures, including the classics, philology, and comparative literature; the stimulation of advanced work and individual research in any of these fields; promotion of international amity. We support efforts to define and apply the principles of academic ethics.

In April 1925, Phi Sigma Iota became a national society with the installation of Beta chapter at Pennsylvania State University. Church served as the first national president. Less than a year later, Gamma chapter was formed at the College of Wooster. The society convened its first convention at Allegheny College in May 1926.

At the November 1935 national convention, Phi Sigma Iota merged with Alpha Zeta Pi, a similar society that operated west of the Mississippi River. Alpha Zeta Pi was established on October 31, 1917 by Dr. Etienne Renaud at University of Denver. Renaud was national President of Alpha Zeta Pi from 1917 to 1930.

Alpha Zeta Pi's first 8 chapters were at University of Denver, University of North Dakota, Washington University in St. Louis, Texas Christian University, University of Colorado, Colorado State Teachers College, Southern Methodist University, and University of Wyoming.

Phi Sigma Iota became a member of the Association of College Honor Societies in 1950. In 1955, it had 47 chapters across the United States.

In 1978, the society expanded its mission to recognize outstanding achievements in any foreign language, including applied linguistics, bilingual education, classics, comparative literature, and philology. At that time, it became the National Foreign Language Honor Society Phi Sigma Iota. In 1982, the society became the International Foreign Language Honor Society when it chartered its first chapter in a foreign country at the Universidad Regiomontana, Monterrey, Mexico. In 2011, the society had 173 chapters and 39,056 members.

Today, Phi Sigma Iota represents all languages and has initiated more than 50,000 members. Its national headquarters are in Meadville, Pennsylvania.

== Symbols ==
The society's Greek letters Phi, Sigma, and Iota represent Philotès or Friendship, Spoudé or Research and Individuality, and Idioma or Zeal. The colors of the Society are purple and white. The society's coat of arms or shield includes its colors and designs that symbolize the original five languages and literary traditions that Phi Sigma Iota included.

Robert E. Dengler, a professor of classics at the Pennsylvania State University, designed the society's insignia, key, and pin which were adopted in 1935. The society's key and pin feature a five-pointed star encircled by an ivy wreath, with the Greek Letter ΦΣΙ over the star. The five points of the star represent the five ancient languages that Phi Sigma Iota originally recognized. The wreath or chaplet or ivy honor the birth of the Roman poet Horace in 65 B.C.

The Forum of Phi Sigma Iota is published annually and includes articles, essays, and poetry written by society members. Its former journal, Phi Sigma Iota News Letter, was published twice a year.

== Activities ==
Every year, Phi Sigma Iota awards several scholastic grants to its members. Its first scholarship, the Henry Ward Church Memorial Scholarship, was established in 1939 in memory of the society's founder and first national president. The Dr. Anthony S. Corbiere Scholarship was created in 1970 to honor Corbiere's service as the society's national historian, newsletter editor, and executive secretary for almost thirty years.

Two additional named scholarships were created in 2000—the Dr. Cleon Capsus Scholarship and the Dr. Santiago Vilas Scholarship. Capsus was a professor of Spanish and Portuguese at the University of South Florida. Vilas was former national president of Phi Sigma Iota. The Dr. Marie-France Hilgar Scholarship was established to honor another former national president. The Dorothy I. Mitstifer Scholarship was established by the society's executive committee in September 2015 to honor the former president of the Association of College Honor Societies who advised Phi Sigma Iota during transitional times.

== Membership ==
Phi Sigma Iota selects qualified members regardless of age, color, disability, gender, national origin, race, religion, or sexual orientation. Membership in Phi Sigma Iota is based on academic achievement in the fields of classics, comparative literature, ESL, foreign language, foreign language education, linguistics, and second language acquisition.

Undergraduates must be enrolled in a third-year or fourth-year language course and have at least a B+ average in language classes. In addition, undergraduate candidates must have an overall B GPA and rank in the upper 35% of their class. Usually, undergraduates are elected to membership in their junior or senior year. Graduate students are eligible for membership after completing one-semester studying language with a B+ grade point average.

Alumni of collegiate chapters are considered professional members. Others can be elected to professional membership for contributions to the profession, provided they earned a foreign language degree and ranked in the top 35% of their undergraduate class or a 3.5 GPA as a graduate student. University faculty may also become professional members after teaching for one academic year and demonstrating support for the field. Honorary membership is awarded to individuals outside of the field "who have made distinctive scholarly and research contributions to the study, use, or promotion of foreign languages and the ideals of the society".

== Chapters ==
As of 2024, Phi Sigma Iota has 180 chapters in the United States and France.

== Notable members ==
- Victoria Doudera, member of the Maine House of Representatives

== See also ==
- Honor cords
