= Ruth and Elmer Wellin Museum of Art =

- Location of Ruth and Elmer Wellin Museum of Art in New York State Ruth and Elmer Wellin Museum of Art (the United States)
- Established: 2012
- Location: 198 College Hill Road; Clinton, New York
- Coordinates: 43.0513°N 75.4039°W
- Type: Art museum
- Owner: Hamilton College
- Website: Official website

The Ruth and Elmer Wellin Museum of Art is a teaching museum on the campus of Hamilton College in Kirkland, New York. The museum is open to the public, and has a varied collection of some 10,000 objects from a wide range of cultures and periods.

The Wellin Museum opened in 2012 with Tracy L. Adler as its founding Director. Its 30,537-square-foot (2,837 m^{2}) building was designed by Machado Silvetti.

The museum was the recipient of the 1999 American Association of Museums "Museums Publications Design Competition" for an invitation design by Doreen DiNicola and produced for its exhibition Artist/Author: Contemporary Artist's Books. In 2012 the new museum inherited the existing collections of the college, latterly known as the "Emerson Gallery".
