= Anya and Andrew Shiva Art Gallery =

Art gallery at the City University of New York, US

Coordinates: 40.7708°N 73.9886°W

The Anya and Andrew Shiva Art Gallery is the primary fine art gallery at John Jay College of Criminal Justice, a senior college of the City University of New York in Hell's Kitchen, Manhattan, New York City. The exhibitions feature a variety of media, but are heavily focused on social issues and the humanities. The exhibits in 2012 showed works on social justice, and 2013 exhibits showed works on women in social justice.

Opened in 2013, the gallery is 4,050 square feet (376 m^{2}) and is on the ground floor of John Jay's 620,000-square-foot (58,000 m^{2}) building that sits on 11th Avenue and 59th Street (524 West 59th Street) in New York City, a four block walk from Central Park. The building was designed by Skidmore, Owings, & Merrill.
