= Hostos Center for the Arts & Culture =

Arts center in New York City

- Hostos Center

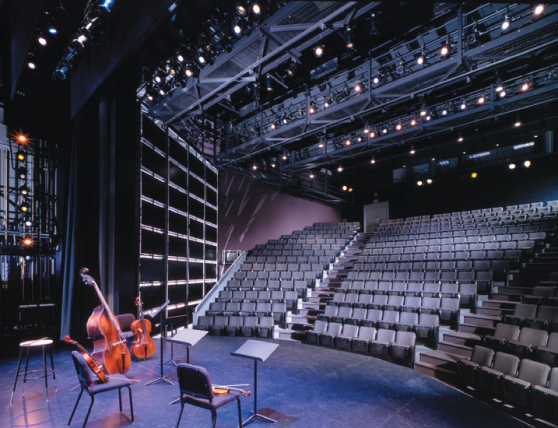
- The 367-seat Repertory Theatre at Hostos Center for the Arts & Culture
- Interactive map of Hostos Center for the Arts & Culture
- Address: 450 Grand Concourse
- Location: Bronx, New York City, US
- Coordinates: 40.8174°N 73.9273°W
- Type: Performing-arts center
- Public transit: Subway: to 149th Street–Grand Concourse; Bus: Bx1, Bx2, Bx19

Construction
- Opened: 1982

Website
- Official website

Hostos Center for the Arts & Culture is a performing arts and visual arts center located within Hostos Community College in the South Bronx, New York City. Hostos Center consists of a museum-grade art gallery, a 367-seat repertory theater, and an 884-seat main theater. The building design is the work of the architectural firm Gwathmey Siegel & Associates who was honored with the 1988 Excellence in Design Award from the Art Commission of the City of New York for their design.

Hostos Center has been showcasing theater, dance and music artists for 33 years, with the mission "to be a cultural force in the Bronx and throughout the New York metropolitan area." The New York Times has called the organization “the powerful locus for Latino art” in the Bronx. The programming consists of a performing arts presenting series; a visual arts exhibiting series; periodic festivals featuring different cultural traditions including the highly acclaimed BomPlenazo, the Hostos Repertory Company, a children's performing arts series, and an individual artists’ program consisting of commissions and residencies. Over the years, The Center has presented and exhibited such artists as Rubén Blades, Dizzy Gillespie, Eddie Palmieri, Dance Theatre of Harlem, Ballet de San Juan, Ajkun Ballet Theatre, Alvin Ailey American Dance Theater, Ballet Hispánico, Jennifer Mueller, Antonio Martorell, Faith Ringgold, Celia Cruz, Marc Anthony, Tito Puente and Lucecita Benítez.
