= List of natural history museums in the United States =

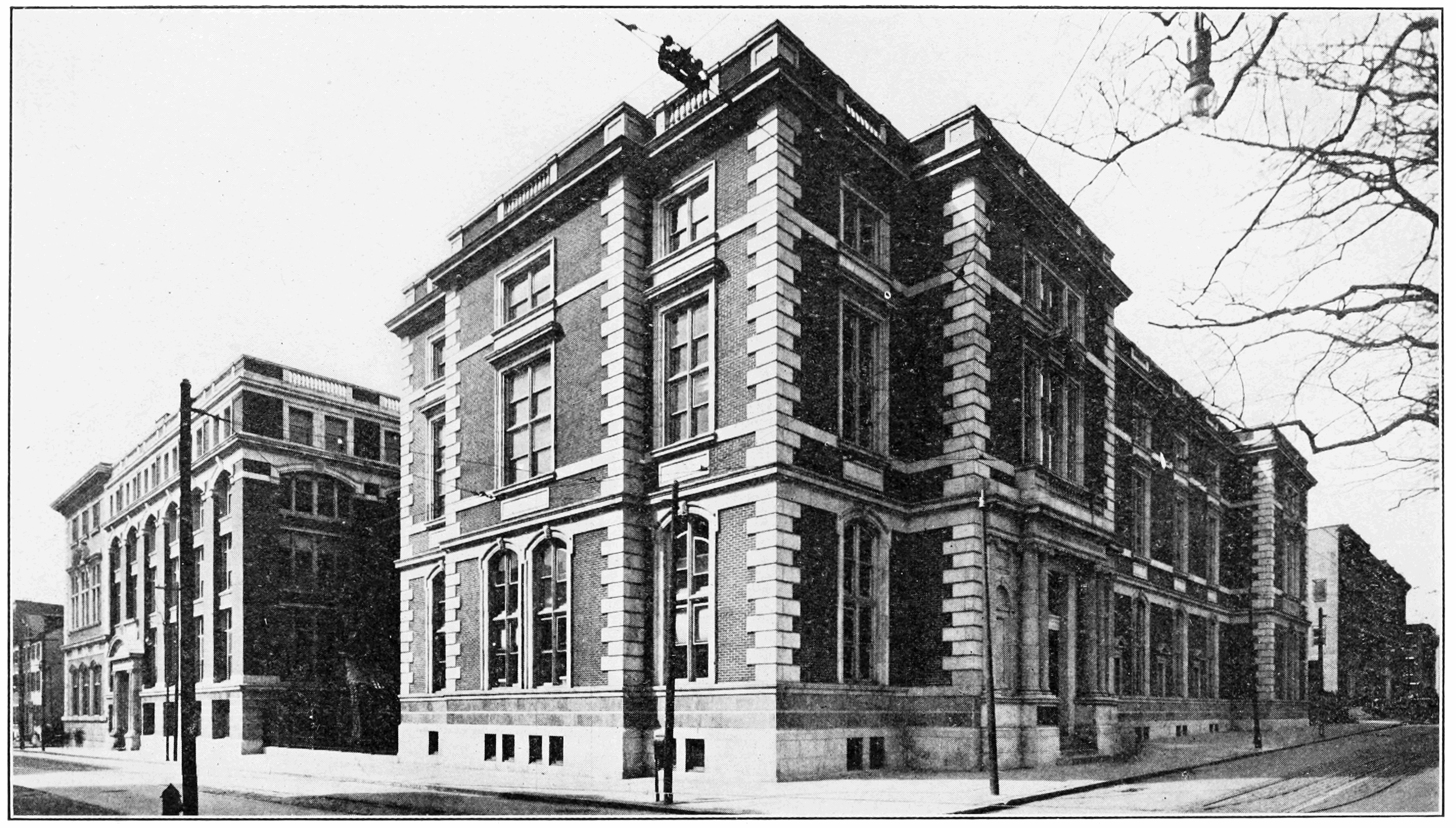
The Academy of Natural Sciences of Philadelphia, America's first natural history museum

There are natural history museums in all 50 of the United States and the District of Columbia. The oldest such museum, the Academy of Natural Sciences in Philadelphia, Pennsylvania, was founded in 1812.

== Alabama ==
- Alabama Museum of Natural History, Tuscaloosa
- Anniston Museum of Natural History, Anniston
- Auburn University Museum of Natural History, Auburn
- Cook's Natural Science Museum, Decatur
- Dauphin Island Sea Lab, Dauphin Island
- Mann Wildlife Learning Museum, Montgomery
- McWane Science Center, Birmingham
- Southern Environmental Center, Birmingham
- Weeks Bay Interpretive Center, Fairhope

== Alaska ==
- Alaska Museum of Science and Nature, Anchorage
- Alaska State Centennial Museum, Juneau
- Pratt Museum, Homer
- Southeast Alaska Discovery Center, Ketchikan
- University of Alaska Museum of the North, Fairbanks

== Arizona ==
- Arizona Mining and Mineral Museum, Phoenix
- Arizona Museum of Natural History, Mesa
- Arizona-Sonora Desert Museum, Tucson
- Center for Meteorite Studies, Arizona State University, Tempe
- International Wildlife Museum, Tucson
- Meteor Crater, Winslow
- Museum of Northern Arizona, Flagstaff
- Petrified Forest National Park, Navajo County
- University of Arizona Mineral Museum, Tucson

== Arkansas ==
- Arkansas Museum of Discovery, Little Rock
- Arkansas River Visitor Center, Russellville
- Turner Neal Museum of Natural History, Monticello
- White River National Wildlife Refuge, DeWitt

== California ==
- Arcata Marsh Interpretive Center, Arcata
- Bohart Museum of Entomology, University of California, Davis, Davis
- Bowers Museum, Santa Ana
- Buena Vista Museum of Natural History, Bakersfield
- California Academy of Sciences, San Francisco
- California Mining and Mineral Museum, Mariposa
- Carolyn Parr Nature Center, Napa
- Chico Creek Nature Center, Chico
- CuriOdyssey, San Mateo
- Entomology Research Museum, University of California, Riverside, Riverside
- Essig Museum of Entomology, University of California, Berkeley, Berkeley
- Fallbrook Gem and Mineral Society Museum, Fallbrook
- Fossil Discovery Center of Madera County, Chowchilla
- Gateway Science Museum, Chico
- Gaumer's Jewelry & Museum, Red Bluff
- Giant Forest Museum, Tulare County
- Gray Lodge Wildlife Area, Gridley
- Great Valley Museum of Natural History, Modesto
- Heritage of the Americas Museum, Rancho San Diego
- Hi-Desert Nature Museum, Yucca Valley
- Human Evolution Research Center, UC Berkeley
- Humboldt State University Natural History Museum, Arcata
- Humboldt State University Wildlife Museum, Arcata
- Imperial Valley College Desert Museum, Ocotillo
- John D. Cooper Archaeological and Paleontological Center, Orange County
- Joshua Tree National Park, Riverside & San Bernardino Counties
- Junior Museum & Zoo, Palo Alto
- Jurupa Mountains Discovery Center, Jurupa Valley
- Klamath National Forest, Siskiyou County
- Lassen Volcanic National Park, Redding
- Lindsay Wildlife Experience, Walnut Creek
- Loomis Museum, Shingletown
- Maidu Museum & Historic Site, Roseville
- Maturango Museum, Ridgecrest
- Mono Basin National Scenic Area Visitor Center, Lee Vining
- Morro Bay State Park Museum of Natural History, Morro Bay
- Monterey Bay Aquarium, Monterey
- Museum of Riverside, Riverside
- Museum of Vertebrate Zoology, Berkeley
- Museum of Wildlife and Fish Biology, Davis
- Napa Valley Museum, Yountville
- Natural History Museum of Los Angeles County, Los Angeles
- Oakland Museum of California, Oakland
- Pacific Grove Museum of Natural History, Pacific Grove
- Page Museum - La Brea Tar Pits, Los Angeles
- Petaluma Wildlife & Natural Science Museum, Petaluma
- Phoebe A. Hearst Museum of Anthropology, UC Berkeley
- Point Reyes National Seashore, Marin County
- Point Vicente Interpretive Center, Rancho Palos Verdes
- Randall Museum, Corona Heights Park, San Francisco
- Ralph B. Clark Regional Park, Buena Park
- Raymond M. Alf Museum of Paleontology, Claremont
- San Bernardino County Museum, Redlands
- San Diego Natural History Museum, San Diego
- San Gabriel River Discovery Center, South El Monte
- Santa Barbara Museum of Natural History, Santa Barbara
- Santa Barbara Museum of Natural History Sea Center, Santa Barbara
- Santa Cruz Museum of Natural History, Santa Cruz
- Seymour Marine Discovery Center, Santa Cruz
- Sierra College Natural History Museum, Rocklin
- Tehama County Museum, Tehama
- Turtle Bay Exploration Park, Redding
- Western Science Center, Hemet
- University of California Museum of Paleontology, UC Berkeley
- University and Jepson Herbaria, UC Berkeley
- Western Foundation of Vertebrate Zoology, Camarillo
- World Museum of Natural History, La Sierra University, Riverside

== Colorado ==
- Denver Museum of Nature and Science, Denver
- Rocky Mountain Dinosaur Resource Center, Woodland Park
- May Natural History Museum, Colorado Springs
- Morrison Natural History Museum, Morrison
- Museum of Western Colorado's Dinosaur Journey Museum, Fruita
- University of Colorado Museum of Natural History, Boulder
- The Wildlife Experience, Parker

== Connecticut ==
- Bruce Museum of Arts and Science, Greenwich
- Connecticut Audubon Society Birdcraft Museum and Sanctuary, Fairfield
- Connecticut State Museum of Natural History, Storrs
- Denison Pequotsepos Nature Center, Mystic
- Dinosaur Place at Nature's Art Village, Montville
- Dinosaur State Park and Arboretum, Rocky Hill
- Earthplace, Westport
- Northwest Park Nature Center, Windsor
- Peabody Museum of Natural History at Yale University, New Haven
- Peoples State Forest Nature Museum, Barkhamsted
- Stamford Museum and Nature Center, Stamford
- White Memorial Conservation Center, Litchfield
- Wesleyan Joe Webb Peoples Museum of Natural History, at Wesleyan University, Middletown

== Delaware ==
- Delaware Center for Horticulture, Greenville
- Delaware Mineralogical Society, Wilmington
- Delaware Museum of Nature and Science, Wilmington
- Iron Hill Museum & Science Center, Newark
- University of Delaware Mineralogical Museum, Newark

== District of Columbia ==
- National Geographic Museum at Explorers Hall, Washington, D.C.
- National Museum of Natural History, Smithsonian Institution, Washington, D.C.

== Florida ==
- Bailey-Matthews National Shell Museum, Sanibel
- Bishop Museum of Science and Nature, Bradenton
- Butterfly World, Coconut Creek
- Calusa Nature Center and Planetarium, Fort Myers
- Crane Point Museum, Nature Center and Historic Site, Marathon
- Elsa Kimbell Environmental Education and Research Center, Hobe Sound
- Rookery Bay Environmental Learning Center, Naples
- Fairchild Tropical Botanic Garden, Coral Gables
- Florida Keys Eco-Discovery Center, Key West
- Florida Museum of Natural History, Gainesville
- Huguenot Memorial Park Nature Center, Jacksonville
- Fred Dana Marsh Museum, Ormond Beach
- Harbor Branch Ocean Discovery Center, Fort Pierce
- Historic Spanish Point, Osprey
- Jacksonville University Life Sciences Museum, Jacksonville
- Loggerhead Marinelife Center, Juno Beach
- Marine Science Center, Ponce Inlet
- Mulberry Phosphate Museum, Mulberry
- Museum of Arts and Sciences, Daytona Beach
- Museum of Dinosaurs and Ancient Cultures, Cocoa Beach
- Museum of Science and History, Jacksonville
- The Palm Beach Museum of Natural History, Wellington
- Polk's Nature Discovery Center, Lakeland
- Sandoway Discovery Center, Delray Beach
- Silver River Museum, Silver Springs
- Tallahassee Museum, Tallahassee
- Terramar Visitor Center, Fort Lauderdale
- Tree Hill Nature Center, Jacksonville
- Weedon Island Preserve Cultural and Natural History Center, St. Petersburg

== Georgia ==
- Charlie Elliott Wildlife Center, Mansfield
- Dauset Trails Nature Center, Jackson
- Elachee Nature Science Center, Gainesville
- Fernbank Museum of Natural History, Atlanta
- Georgia Museum of Natural History, Athens
- Georgia Southern University Museum, Statesboro
- Go Fish Education Center, Perry
- Museum of Arts and Sciences, Macon
- Sapelo Island Visitors Center, Sapelo Island
- Savannah-Ogeechee Canal Museum & Nature Center, Savannah
- Tellus Science Museum, Cartersville
- Tidelands Nature Center, Jekyll Island
- West Georgia Museum, Tallapoosa
- William P. Wall Museum of Natural History, Milledgeville

== Hawai'i ==
- Bernice P. Bishop Museum, Honolulu
- Hawaii Nature Center, Maui
- Kauaʻi Museum, Lihue
- Kōke'e Museum, Kauai
- Lucoral Museum, Honolulu
- Lyman House Memorial Museum, Hilo
- Mokupāpapa Discovery Center, Hilo
- Nani Mau Gardens, Hilo

== Idaho ==
- Boise State University Vertebrate Museum, Boise
- Canyon Crossroads Transportation Museum, Melba
- Hagerman Fossil Beds National Monument, Hagerman
- Herrett Center for Arts and Science, Twin Falls
- Idaho Heritage Museum, Twin Falls
- Idaho Museum of Natural History, Pocatello
- MK Nature Center, Boise
- Museum of Idaho, Idaho Falls
- Orma J. Smith Museum of Natural History, Caldwell

== Illinois ==
- Burpee Museum of Natural History, Rockford
- Elgin Public Museum, Elgin
- Evelyn Pease Tyner Interpretive Center, Glenview
- Field Museum of Natural History, Chicago
- Fryxell Geology Museum, Rock Island
- The Grove National Historic Landmark, Glenview
- Henry N. Barkhausen Cache River Wetlands Center, Cypress
- Jarrett Prairie Center, Byron
- Jurica-Suchy Nature Museum, Benedictine University, Lisle
- Illinois State Museum, Springfield
- Midwest Museum of Natural History, Sycamore
- Chicago Academy of Sciences/Peggy Notebaert Nature Museum, Chicago
- Peoria Riverfront Museum, Peoria
- Prairie Grass Nature Museum, Round Lake
- Trailside Museum of Natural History, River Forest
- Western Illinois University Museum of Geology, Macomb

== Indiana ==
- Evansville Museum of Arts, History and Science, Evansville
- Falls of the Ohio State Park Interpretive Center, Clarksville
- Hayes Arboretum, Richmond
- The Children's Museum of Indianapolis, Indianapolis
- Indiana State Museum, Indianapolis
- Joseph Moore Museum, Richmond
- Minnetrista, Muncie
- Museum of Biodiversity, Notre Dame
- Sumner B. Sheets Museum of Wildlife and Marine Exhibits, Huntington

== Iowa ==
- Dorothy Pecaut Nature Center, Sioux City
- Fossil & Prairie Center, Rockford
- Prairie Learning Center, Prairie City
- Putnam Museum, Davenport
- Sanford Museum & Planetarium, Cherokee
- University of Iowa Museum of Natural History, Iowa City
- University of Northern Iowa Museum, University of Northern Iowa, Cedar Falls
- Voas Nature Area & Museum, Minburn

== Kansas ==
- Fick Fossil Museum, Oakley
- Flint Hills Discovery Center, Manhattan
- Great Plains Nature Center, Wichita
- Johnston Geology Museum, Emporia
- Kansas State University Insect Zoo, Manhattan
- Keystone Gallery, Oakley
- Museum at Prairiefire, Overland Park
- Museum of World Treasures, Wichita
- Pratt Education Center, Pratt
- Schmidt Museum of Natural History, Emporia
- Sternberg Museum of Natural History, Hays
- University of Kansas Natural History Museum, Lawrence

== Kentucky ==
- American Cave Museum, Horse Cave
- American Saddlebred Museum, Lexington
- Ben E. Clement Mineral Museum, Marion
- Big Bone Lick State Park, Big Bone
- Cumberland Inn Museum - Henkelmann Life Science Collection, Williamsburg
- Mammoth Cave Wildlife Museum, Cave City

== Louisiana ==
- Black Bayou Lake National Wildlife Refuge, Ouachita Parish
- Cameron Prairie National Wildlife Refuge, Lake Charles
- Jean Lafitte National Historical Park and Preserve, Marrero
- Lafayette Science Museum, Lafayette
- Louisiana Art and Science Museum, Baton Rouge
- Louisiana Museum of Natural History, Baton Rouge
- Touchstone Wildlife and Art Museum, Haughton
- ULM Museum of Natural History, Monroe

== Maine ==
- Bar Harbor Whale Museum, Bar Harbor
- George B. Dorr Museum of Natural History, Bar Harbor
- International Cryptozoology Museum, Portland
- Kenneth E. Stoddard Shell Museum, Boothbay
- L. C. Bates Museum, Hinckley
- Maine Art Glass Butterfly and Insect Museum, Lisbon Falls
- Maine Gem and Mineral Museum, Bethel
- Maine State Museum, Augusta
- Monhegan Museum, Monhegan
- Northern Maine Museum of Science, Presque Isle
- Nylander Museum, Caribou
- Project Puffin § Project Puffin Visitor Center, Rockland
- Wilson Museum, Castine

== Maryland ==
- Blackwater National Wildlife Refuge Visitor Center, Dorchester County
- Deep Creek Lake State Park Discovery Center, Garrett County
- Eden Mill Nature Center, Pylesville
- Irvine Nature Center, Owings Mills
- Maryland Science Center, Baltimore
- Patuxent Research Refuge, Laurel
- Natural History Society of Maryland, Baltimore

== Massachusetts ==
- Bartholomew's Cobble, Sheffield
- Beneski Museum of Natural History at Amherst College, Amherst
- Berkshire Museum, Pittsfield
- Blue Hills Trailside Museum, Norfolk County
- Cape Cod Museum of Natural History, Brewster
- EcoTarium, Worcester
- Fisher Museum, Petersham
- Great Falls Discovery Center, Turners Falls
- Harvard Museum of Natural History, Cambridge
- Marion Natural History Museum, Marion
- Nash Dinosaur Track Site and Rock Shop, South Hadley
- Natural Science Museum in Hinchman House, Nantucket
- North Adams Museum of History and Science, North Adams
- South Shore Natural Science Center, Norwell
- Springfield Science Museum, Springfield

== Michigan ==
- A. E. Seaman Mineral Museum, Houghton
- Besser Museum for Northeast Michigan, Alpena
- Call of the Wild & Bavarian Falls Park, Gaylord
- Card Wildlife Education Center and Wildlife Museum, Big Rapids
- Carl T. Johnson Hunting and Fishing Center, Cadillac
- Carnegie Museum of the Keweenaw, Houghton
- Cranbrook Institute of Science, Bloomfield Hills
- Gerald E. Eddy Discovery Center, Jackson & Washtenaw Counties
- Gillette Sand Dune Visitor Center, Muskegon & Ottawa Counties
- Gitchee Gumee Museum, Grand Marais
- Historic Mill Creek Discovery Park, Mackinaw City
- Inland Seas Education Center, Suttons Bay
- Kalamazoo Valley Museum, Kalamazoo
- Kingman Museum, Battle Creek
- Lakeshore Museum Center, Muskegon
- Marshlands Museum and Nature Center, Wayne County
- Michigan Whitetail Hall of Fame Museum, Grass Lake
- Museum of Cultural & Natural History, Mount Pleasant
- Ottawa Visitor Center, Watersmeet
- Spirit of the Woods Museum, Elk Rapids
- University of Michigan Museum of Natural History, Ann Arbor

== Minnesota ==
- Bell Museum of Natural History, Saint Paul
- Great Lakes Aquarium, Duluth
- International Wolf Center, Ely
- Moose Lake State Park Agate and Geological Interpretive Center, Carlton County
- National Eagle Center, Wabasha
- North American Bear Center, Ely
- Raptor Ridge, Spicer
- Redwood County Poor Farm, Redwood Falls
- Science Museum of Minnesota, Saint Paul
- SMSU Museum of Natural History, Marshall

== Mississippi ==
- Center for Marine Education and Research, Gulfport
- Clinton Community Nature Center, Clinton
- Grenada Lake Visitors Center Museum, Grenada
- Gulf Islands National Seashore Visitor Center, Ocean Springs
- Mississippi Entomological Museum, Mississippi State University, Starkville
- Mississippi Museum of Natural Science, Jackson
- Mississippi Petrified Forest, Flora
- Museum of the Mississippi Delta, Greenwood
- Scranton Nature Center, Pascagoula
- Strawberry Plains Audubon Center, Holly Springs
- Tunica RiverPark, Tunica Resorts

== Missouri ==
- Bollinger County Museum of Natural History, Marble Hill
- Bonebrake Center of Nature and History, Salem
- Branson Dinosaur Museum, Branson
- Ed Clark Museum of Missouri Geology, Rolla
- Enns Entomology Museum, Columbia
- Harry S. Truman Regional Visitor Center, Warsaw
- Jefferson Barracks Telephone Museum, Saint Louis
- Joplin Museum Complex, Joplin
- Kansas City Museum, Kansas City
- Maramec Museum at Maramec Spring Park, St. James
- Mastodon State Historic Site, St. Louis
- Missouri State Museum, Jefferson City
- Saint Louis Science Center, St. Louis
- Ozark Natural & Cultural Resource Center, Salem
- Remington Nature Center, Saint Joseph
- Sophia M. Sachs Butterfly House, Chesterfield
- Missouri Institute of Natural Science, Springfield
- Stephens Museum, Fayette
- Weldon Spring Site Interpretive Center, St. Charles
- Wonders of Wildlife Museum & Aquarium, Springfield
- World Aquarium, St. Louis

== Montana ==
- Carter County Museum, Ekalaka
- Central Montana Museum, Lewistown
- Fort Peck Interpretive Center, Fort Peck
- Great Plains Dinosaur Museum and Field Station, Malta
- Grizzly & Wolf Discovery Center, West Yellowstone
- Makoshika Dinosaur Museum, Glendive
- Montana Natural History Center, Missoula
- Montana State University Vertebrate Museum, Bozeman
- Museum of the Rockies, Bozeman
- North American Wildlife Museum, Coram
- Philip L. Wright Zoological Museum, Missoula
- Phillips County Museum, Malta
- Rudyard Museum, Rudyard
- Montana Dinosaur Center, Bynum
- Wildlife Museum of the West, Ennis

== Nebraska ==
- Agate Fossil Beds National Monument, Sioux County
- Arbor Day Farm, Nebraska City
- Ashfall Fossil Beds State Historical Park, Royal
- Bartels Museum, Seward
- Corps of Discovery Welcome Center, Crofton
- Eleanor Barbour Cook Museum of Geology, Chadron
- Hudson-Meng Bison Kill, Crawford
- Hastings Museum, Hastings
- Lewis and Clark Visitor Center, Cedar County
- Petrified Wood Gallery, Ogallala
- Pierson Wildlife Museum Learning Center, Neligh
- River Country Nature Center, Nebraska City
- Riverside Discovery Center, Scottsbluff
- Schramm Park State Recreation Area, Gretna
- Trailside Museum of Natural History, Fort Robinson State Park, Crawford
- University of Nebraska State Museum, Lincoln
- Willow Point Gallery, Ashland

== Nevada ==
- Great Basin National Park, Rhyolite
- Ice Age Fossils State Park, North Las Vegas
- Las Vegas Natural History Museum, Las Vegas
- Las Vegas Springs Preserve, Las Vegas
- Marjorie Barrick Museum of Natural History, Las Vegas
- Nevada State Museum, Carson City, Carson City
- Nevada State Museum, Las Vegas, Las Vegas
- Northeastern Nevada Museum, Elko
- Pahrump Valley Museum, Pahrump
- Wilbur D. May Center, Reno

== New Hampshire ==
- Amoskeag Fishways Learning and Visitors Center, Manchester
- Great Bay Discovery Center, Greenland
- Libby Museum, Wolfeboro
- Loon Center, Moultonborough
- Nature Discovery Center, Warner
- Squam Lakes Natural Science Center, Holderness
- Woodman Institute Museum, Dover

== New Jersey ==
- Discovery Shell Museum, Ocean City
- Franklin Mineral Museum, Franklin
- Edelman Fossil Park & Museum, Mantua
- Insectropolis, Toms River
- Marine Mammal Stranding Center, Brigantine
- Morris Museum, Morristown
- New Jersey State Museum, Trenton
- Poricy Park, Middletown Township
- Rutgers University Geology Museum, New Brunswick
- Trailside Nature & Science Center, Union County
- Washington Crossing State Park Nature Center, Hopewell Township
- The Wetlands Institute, Stone Harbor

== New Mexico ==
- American International Rattlesnake Museum, Albuquerque
- Bolack Museum of Fish & Wildlife, Farmington
- Capulin Volcano National Monument, Union County
- Carlsbad Caverns National Park, Carlsbad
- Chiricahua Desert Museum, Rodeo
- Dr. Antonio Gennaro Natural History Museum, Portales
- El Morro National Monument, Ramah
- Las Cruces Museum of Nature and Science, Las Cruces
- Mesalands Community College's Dinosaur Museum, Tucumcari
- Miles Mineral Museum, Portales
- Museum of Southwestern Biology, University of New Mexico, Albuquerque
- New Mexico Museum of Natural History and Science, Albuquerque
- New Mexico State University Arthropod Museum, Las Cruces
- Ruth Hall Museum of Paleontology, Abiquiú
- Smokey Bear Historical Park, Capitan
- White Sands National Park, Doña Ana and Otero Counties
- Zuhl Museum, Las Cruces

== New York ==
- Albany Pine Bush Discovery Center, Albany
- American Museum of Natural History, New York City
- Buffalo Museum of Science, Buffalo
- Caleb Smith State Park Preserve, Smithtown
- Cave House Museum of Mining & Geology, Howes Cave
- Charles Dickert Wildlife Collection, Saranac Lake
- Cornell University Museum of Vertebrates, Ithaca
- Emma Treadwell Thacher Nature Center, Voorheesville
- Garvies Point Museum and Preserve, Glen Cove
- Herkimer Diamond Mines Museum, Herkimer
- Hicksville Gregory Museum, Hicksville
- Hudson Highlands Nature Museum, Cornwall-on-Hudson
- Hudson River Museum, Yonkers
- Morrisville State College Wildlife Museum, Morrisville
- Museum of Long Island Natural Sciences, Stony Brook University, Stony Brook
- Museum of the Earth, Ithaca
- New York State Museum, Albany
- Niagara Gorge Discovery Center, Niagara Falls
- Niagara Science Museum, Niagara Falls
- Paleontological Research Institution, Ithaca
- Pember Museum of Natural History, Granville
- Roberson Museum and Science Center, Binghamton
- Robert M. Linsley Geology Museum, Hamilton
- Roger Tory Peterson Institute of Natural History, Jamestown
- South Fork Natural History Museum, Bridgehampton, New York
- Tackapausha Museum and Preserve, Seaford
- Tanglewood Nature Center & Museum, Elmira
- Trailside Museums and Zoo, Bear Mountain State Park
- Trailside Nature Museum, Cross River
- Up Yonda Farm, Bolton Landing
- Vanderbilt Museum, Centerport
- Walter Elwood Museum, Amsterdam
- Waterman Conservation Education Center, Apalachin
- The Wild Center, Tupper Lake
- Wildlife Sports and Educational Museum, Vail Mills
- William B. Hoyt II Visitor Center, Mount Morris

== North Carolina ==
- Asheville Museum of Science, Asheville
- Aurora Fossil Museum, Aurora
- Centennial Campus Center for Wildlife Education, Raleigh
- Core Sound Waterfowl Museum, Harkers Island
- Corolla Wild Horse Museum, Corolla
- Cradle of Forestry in America, Asheville
- Discovery Place, Charlotte
- Duke Lemur Center Museum of Natural History, Durham
- Franklin Gem & Mineral Museum, Franklin
- Frisco Native American Museum & Natural History Center, Frisco
- Grandfather Mountain Nature Museum, Linville
- Greensboro Science Center, Greensboro
- Highlands Nature Center, Highlands
- Jockey's Ridge State Park, Dare County
- Lundy–Fetterman Museum & Exhibit Hall, Buies Creek
- McKinney Geology Teaching Museum, Boone
- Mineral and Lapidary Museum, Hendersonville
- Mount Mitchell State Park, Yancey County
- Museum of Coastal Carolina, Ocean Isle Beach
- Museum of North Carolina Minerals, Spruce Pine
- North Carolina Estuarium, Washington
- North Carolina Maritime Museum, Beaufort
- North Carolina Museum of Forestry, Whiteville
- North Carolina Museum of Life and Science, Durham
- North Carolina Museum of Natural Sciences, Raleigh
- North Carolina Museum of Natural Sciences at Whiteville, Whiteville
- Onslow County Museum, Richlands
- Outer Banks Beachcomber Museum, Nags Head
- Outer Banks Center for Wildlife Education, Corolla
- Pisgah Center for Wildlife Education, Pisgah Forest
- Rankin Museum of American Heritage, Ellerbe
- Roanoke/Cashie River Center, Windsor
- Ruby City Gems & Minerals, Franklin
- Schiele Museum of Natural History, Gastonia
- Walter L. Stasavich Science and Nature Center, Greenville
- Weymouth Woods Sandhills Nature Preserve Museum, Moore County
- Wilderness Taxidermy and Wildlife Museum, Franklin

== North Dakota ==
- Dakota Dinosaur Museum, Dickinson
- Frontier Fort and Wildlife Museum, Jamestown
- McLean County Historical Society Museums, Washburn
- Pfennig Wildlife Museum, Beulah
- Pioneer Trails Regional Museum, Bowman

== Ohio ==
- Appalachian Forest Museum, Highland County
- Ashland County Historical Society Museum
- Boonshoft Museum of Discovery, Dayton
- Cincinnati Museum of Natural History & Science, Cincinnati
- Greater Cleveland Aquarium, Cleveland
- Cleveland Museum of Natural History, Cleveland
- Hefner Museum of Natural History
- Karl Limper Geology Museum, Oxford
- Killbuck Valley Museum, Killbuck
- Lake Erie Islands Nature and Wildlife Center, Put-in-Bay
- Lake Erie Nature & Science Center, Bay Village
- Langsdon Mineral Collection, Celina
- Museum of Biological Diversity, The Ohio State University, Columbus
- Nature Center at Shaker Lakes, Shaker Heights
- Orton Geological Museum, The Ohio State University, Columbus

== Oklahoma ==
- A. D. Buck Museum of Science and History, Tonkawa
- American Pigeon Museum, Oklahoma City
- Beavers Bend Wildlife Museum, Broken Bow
- Elsing Museum, Tulsa
- Goddard Youth Museum, Sulphur
- Kenton Mercantile Museum, Kenton
- Lewis Museum, Lawton
- Midgley Museum, Enid
- Museum of Osteology, Oklahoma City
- Museum of the Great Plains, Lawton
- Northwestern Oklahoma State University Natural History Museum, Alva
- Richard O. Dodrill's Museum of Rocks, Minerals & Fossils, Cushing
- Sam Noble Oklahoma Museum of Natural History, Norman
- Timberlake Rose Rock Museum, Noble
- Tucker Tower Nature Center, Ardmore
- Wildlife Heritage Center Museum, Antlers

== Oregon ==
- Columbia Gorge Discovery Center & Museum, The Dalles
- Douglas County Museum, Roseburg
- Fossil Museum & Pine Creek Schoolhouse, Fossil
- Hatfield Marine Science Center, Newport
- High Desert Museum, Bend
- Hutson Museum, Parkdale
- Jensen Arctic Museum, Monmouth
- John Day Fossil Beds National Monument, Grant & Wheeler Counties
- Mount Angel Abbey Museum, Mount Angel
- Oregon Paleo Lands Institute Center, Fossil
- Rice Northwest Museum of Rocks and Minerals, Hillsboro
- Rogue River Museum, Gold Beach
- Sinnott Memorial Observation Station, Crater Lake National Park
- Umpqua Discovery Center, Reedsport
- University of Oregon Museum of Natural and Cultural History, Eugene
- World Forestry Center, Portland

== Pennsylvania ==
- Academy of Natural Sciences of Drexel University, Philadelphia
- Carnegie Museum of Natural History, Pittsburgh
- Center for PostNatural History, Pittsburgh
- Delaware County Institute of Science, Media
- Earth and Mineral Sciences Museum and Art Gallery, University Park
- Everhart Museum, Scranton
- Four Mills Barn, Ambler
- Frost Entomological Museum, University Park
- Mütter Museum, Philadelphia
- North Museum of Nature and Science, Lancaster
- Oakes Museum of Natural History, Mechanicsburg
- Reading Public Museum, West Reading
- Schisler Museum of Wildlife & Natural History and McMunn Planetarium, East Stroudsburg
- State Museum of Pennsylvania, Harrisburg
- Tom Ridge Environmental Center, Erie
- Wagner Free Institute of Science, Philadelphia

== Rhode Island ==
- Edna Lawrence Nature Lab at the Rhode Island School of Design, Providence
- Norman Bird Sanctuary, Middletown
- Roger Williams Park Museum of Natural History and Planetarium, Providence

== South Carolina ==
- Bob Campbell Geology Museum, Clemson
- Brookgreen Gardens, Murrells Inlet
- Charleston Museum, Charleston
- Clemson University Arthropod Collection, Clemson
- Coastal Discovery Museum, Hilton Head Island
- Congaree National Park, Richland County
- Edisto Island Museum, Edisto Island
- Hobcaw Barony Discovery Center, Georgetown
- Horry County Museum, Conway
- Mace Brown Museum of Natural History, Charleston
- McKissick Museum, Columbia
- Museum & Railroad Historical Center of Greenwood, Greenwood
- Museum of York County, Rock Hill
- Ravenel Caw Caw Interpretive Center, Ravenel
- Roper Mountain Science Center, Greenville
- South Carolina Botanical Garden, Clemson
- South Carolina State Museum, Columbia

== South Dakota ==
- Badlands Petrified Garden, Kadoka
- Bays Mountain Park, Kingsport
- Ben Reifel Visitor Center, Badlands National Park
- Black Hills Institute of Geological Research, Hill City
- Buffalo Interpretive Center, Fort Pierre
- Dacotah Prairie Museum, Aberdeen
- Delbridge Museum, Sioux Falls
- Grand River Museum, Lemmon
- Heritage Hall Museum, Freeman
- The Journey Museum and Learning Center, Rapid City
- Lewis and Clark Center Visitor Center, Yankton
- Peter Norbeck Center, Custer
- Petrified Wood Park, Lemmon
- The Mammoth Site, Hot Springs
- South Dakota School of Mines and Technology Museum of Geology, Rapid City
- W. H. Over Museum, Vermillion
- Wind Cave National Park, Hot Springs

== Tennessee ==
- Coon Creek Science Center, Adamsville
- Discovery Center at Murfree Spring, Murfreesboro
- Earth Experience: The Middle Tennessee Museum of Natural History, Murfreesboro
- Gray Fossil Museum, Gray
- Lichterman Nature Center, Memphis
- McClung Museum of Natural History and Culture, Knoxville
- Pink Palace Museum and Planetarium, Memphis
- Discovery Park of America, Union City

== Texas ==
- Amarillo College Natural History Museum, Amarillo
- Austin Nature & Science Center, Austin
- Bay Education Center, Rockport
- Beverly S. Sheffield Education Center, Austin
- Brazosport Museum of Natural Science, Clute
- Brookshire's World of Wildlife Museum and Country Store, Tyler
- Brazos Valley Museum of Natural History, Bryan
- Buckhorn Museum, San Antonio
- Carson County Square House Museum, Panhandle
- Centennial Museum and Chihuahuan Desert Gardens, El Paso
- Corpus Christi Museum of Science and History, Corpus Christi
- Dinosaur Valley State Park, Glen Rose
- Don Harrington Discovery Center, Amarillo
- El Campo Museum of Natural History, El Campo
- Fiedler Memorial Museum, Seguin
- Fort Worth Museum of Science and History, Fort Worth
- Harber Wildlife Museum, Sherman
- Heard Natural Science Museum and Wildlife Sanctuary, McKinney
- Houston Museum of Natural Science, Houston
- Houston Museum of Natural Science at Sugarland, Sugarland
- John C. Freeman Weather Museum, Houston
- John E. Conner Museum, Kingsville
- Mayborn Museum Complex, Waco
- Moody Gardens, Galveston
- Museum of Texas Tech University, Lubbock
- Naranjo Museum of Natural History, Lufkin
- Odessa Meteor Crater, Odessa
- Panhandle–Plains Historical Museum, Canyon
- Perot Museum of Nature and Science, Dallas
- Texas Forestry Museum, Lufkin
- Texas Freshwater Fisheries Center, Athens
- Texas Memorial Museum, Austin
- UT Biodiversity Center, Austin
- Waco Mammoth National Monument, Waco
- White Rock Lake Museum, Dallas
- Whiteside Museum of Natural History, Seymour
- Witte Museum, San Antonio

== Utah ==
- Arches National Park, Moab
- Box Elder Museum, Brigham City
- Bryce Canyon National Park, Bryce
- Bryce Museum, Bryce
- BYU Museum of Paleontology, Provo
- Canyonlands National Park, Moab
- Capitol Reef National Park, Torrey
- Cleveland-Lloyd Dinosaur Quarry, Cleveland
- Dan O'Laurie Museum of Moab, Moab
- The Dinosaur Museum, Blanding
- Dinosaur National Monument, Vernal
- Eccles Dinosaur Park, Ogden
- Fairview Museum of History and Art, Fairview
- Grand Staircase–Escalante National Monument, Kane & Garfield Counties
- Great Basin Museum, Delta
- John Hutchings Museum of Natural History, Lehi
- Monte L. Bean Life Science Museum, Provo
- Moqui Cave, Kanab
- Museum of Ancient Life, Lehi
- Museum of Moab, Moab
- Museum of the San Rafael Swell, Castle Dale
- Natural History Museum of Utah, Salt Lake City
- Paunsaugunt Western Wildlife Museum, Bryce
- Rosenbruch Wildlife Museum, St. George
- St. George Dinosaur Discovery Site at Johnson Farm, St. George
- Utah Field House of Natural History, Vernal
- Utah State University Eastern Prehistoric Museum, Price
- Weber State University Museum of Natural Science, Ogden

== Vermont ==
- Birds of Vermont Museum, Huntington
- ECHO, Leahy Center for Lake Champlain, Burlington
- Fairbanks Museum and Planetarium, St. Johnsbury
- Montshire Museum of Science, Norwich
- National Museum of the Morgan Horse, Middlebury
- Nature Museum at Grafton, Grafton
- Perkins Geology Museum, Burlington
- Southern Vermont Natural History Museum, Marlboro

== Virginia ==
- Esther Thomas Atkinson Museum, Hampden Sydney
- Hermitage Foundation Museum and Gardens, Norfolk
- Hostetter Museum of Natural History, Eastern Mennonite University, Harrisonburg
- James Madison University Mineral Museum, Harrisonburg
- Luray Caverns, Luray
- Maymont, Richmond
- Museum of Geosciences, Blacksburg
- Museum of the Middle Appalachians, Saltville
- Philpott Lake Visitor Center, Bassett
- Radford University Museum of the Earth Sciences, Radford
- Science Museum of Virginia, Richmond
- Virginia Aquarium & Marine Science Center, Virginia Beach
- Virginia Institute of Marine Science, Gloucester Point
- Virginia Living Museum, Newport News
- Virginia Museum of Natural History, Martinsville

== Washington ==
- Breazeale Interpretive Center, Skagit County
- Burke Museum of Natural History and Culture, Seattle
- Charles R. Conner Museum, Pullman
- Coastal Interpretive Center, Ocean Shores
- Cougar Mountain Zoo Wildlife Museum, Issaquah
- Forest Learning Center, Mount St. Helens National Volcanic Monument
- Ginkgo Petrified Forest State Park, Vantage
- Hanford Reach Interpretive Center, Richland
- Karshner Museum, Puyallup
- Longmire Museum, Mount Rainier National Park
- Moses Lake Museum and Art Center, Moses Lake
- Mount St. Helens Visitor Center at Silver Lake, Silver Lake (Cowlitz County)
- Of Sea & Shore Museum, Port Gamble
- Port Townsend Marine Science Center, Port Townsend
- Poulsbo Marine Science Center, Poulsbo
- Robert P Worthman Anatomy Museum, Pullman
- Slater Museum of Natural History, Tacoma
- Stonerose Interpretive Center and Fossil Site, Republic
- Verlot Ranger Station-Public Service Center, Granite Falls
- Wenatchee Valley Museum & Cultural Center, Wenatchee
- The Whale Museum, Friday Harbor
- Whatcom Museum, Bellingham

== West Virginia ==
- Lost World Caverns, Lewisburg
- Seneca Rocks Discovery Center, Seneca Rocks
- West Virginia Geological and Economic Survey's Mini-Museum of Geology & Natural History, Morgantown
- West Virginia State Museum, Charleston

== Wisconsin ==
- Cable Natural History Museum, Cable
- Camp Five Museum, Laona
- Dinosaur Discovery Museum, Kenosha
- Flyways Waterfowl Museum, Baraboo
- James Newman Clark Bird Museum, Eau Claire
- Hoard Historical Museum, Fort Atkinson
- Kenosha Public Museum, Kenosha
- Milwaukee Public Museum, Milwaukee
- Neville Public Museum of Brown County, Green Bay
- New London Public Museum, New London
- Northern Great Lakes Visitor Center, Ashland
- Oshkosh Public Museum, Oshkosh
- Stierle Bird Collection, Marshfield
- University of Wisconsin–Stevens Point Museum of Natural History, Stevens Point
- UW–Madison Geology Museum, Madison
- UW-Madison Zoological Museum, Madison
- Weis Earth Science Museum, University of Wisconsin–Oshkosh, Fox Cities Campus, Menasha
- Wisconsin Museum of International Wildlife, Appleton

== Wyoming ==
- Draper Museum of Natural History, Buffalo Bill Historical Center, Cody
- Craig Thomas Discovery and Visitor Center, Moose
- Devils Tower National Monument, Hulett
- Fishing Bridge Museum, Yellowstone National Park
- Fossil Butte National Monument, Kemmerer
- Madison Museum, Yellowstone National Park
- National Bighorn Sheep Interpretive Center, Dubois
- Nelson Museum of the West, Cheyenne
- Norris Geyser Basin Museum, Yellowstone National Park
- Paleon Museum, Glenrock
- Tate Geological Museum, Casper College, Casper
- University of Wyoming Geological Museum, Laramie
- University of Wyoming Insect Museum, Laramie
- University of Wyoming Museum of Vertebrates, Laramie
- Washakie Museum & Cultural Center, Worland
- Weidner Wildlife Museum, Rock Springs
- Werner Wildlife Museum, Casper
- Western History Center, Lingle
- Wind River Heritage Center, Riverton
- Wyoming Dinosaur Center, Thermopolis
- Wyoming State Museum, Cheyenne

== See also ==
- List of science centers in the United States
- List of nature centers in the United States
- List of museums in the United States
- List of natural history museums
- List of university museums in the United States
