= List of museums in the Shasta Cascade =

The Shasta Cascade region of California is in the northeastern and north-central sections of the state bordering Oregon and Nevada, including far northern parts of the Central Valley and the Sierra Nevada mountain range. The area is centered on Mount Shasta in the California Cascade Range, near the Trinity Alps. Counties included in the Shasta Cascade region include Butte, Lassen, Modoc, Plumas, Shasta, Siskiyou, Tehama and Trinity.

This is a list of museums, defined for this context as institutions (including nonprofit organizations, government entities, and private businesses) that collect and care for objects of cultural, artistic, scientific, or historical interest and make their collections or related exhibits available for public viewing. Also included are non-profit and university art galleries. Museums that exist only in cyberspace (i.e., virtual museums) are not included.

To use the sortable tables: click on the icons at the top of each column to sort that column in alphabetical order; click again for reverse alphabetical order.

== Museums ==
Name	Image	Town/City	County	Type	Summary
Bangor Church		Bangor	Butte	Local history	Operated by the Butte County Historical Society
Bidwell Mansion State Historic Park		Chico	Butte	Historic house	26-room Victorian mansion
Big Valley Museum		Bieber	Lassen	Local history	
Bolt's Antique Tool Museum		Oroville	Butte	Commodity	website, hundreds of hand tools
Butte County Historical Society Museum		Oroville	Butte	Local history	
Butte County Pioneer Memorial Museum		Oroville	Butte	Local history	website, includes household and decorative items, tools, furnishings, quilts, photos, Native American and Chinese artifacts
Butte Valley Museum		Dorris	Siskiyou	Local history	Operated by the Butte Valley Museum & Historical Society
C.F. Lott Home		Oroville	Butte	Historic house	website, Victorian cottage with decorative arts typical of Oroville's pioneer families
Cherokee Museum		Cherokee	Butte	Open-air	
Chester-Lake Almanor Museum		Chester	Plumas	Local history	
Chico Air Museum		Chico	Butte	Aviation	website, historic aircraft and local aviation history artifacts
Chico Creek Nature Center		Chico	Butte	Natural history	Area natural history, live animals, located in Bidwell Park
Chico Museum		Chico	Butte	Local history	website, Chico and Butte County history, includes Chinese Taoist Temple, Chico timeline
Collins Pine Museum		Chester	Plumas	Industry	website, area lumbering and forestry industry
Colman Museum		Chico	Butte	Local history	Facebook site, includes Civil War memorabilia, gold mining equipment, Maidu artifacts, tools, clothing, cooking utensils, school items, Chinese artifacts
Corning Museum, California		Corning	Tehama	Local history	
Dunsmuir Museum		Dunsmuir	Siskiyou	Local history	Operated by the Dunsmuir Railroad Depot Historical Society, local and railroad history
Etna Museum		Etna	Siskiyou	Local history	website, operated by the Native Daughters of the Golden West
Fort Crook Museum		Fall River Mills	Shasta	Open air	website, information, operated by the Fort Crook Historical Society
Fort Jones Museum		Fort Jones	Siskiyou	Local history	website, exhibits of area's inhabitants, including Native Americans, fur trappers, gold miners, pioneers, cowboys and soldiers
Frank C. Reilly Museum		La Porte	Plumas	Local history	Area gold mining and ski racing history
Gateway Science Museum		Chico	Butte	Multiple	website, part of California State University, Chico, science and natural history
Gaumer's Jewelry & Museum		Red Bluff	Tehama	Natural history	website, minerals and mining museum inside the jewelry store
Gold Nugget Museum		Paradise	Butte	Open air	website, includes Maidu Indian artifacts, a blacksmith shop, gold sluices and a miner's cabin, a schoolhouse and a covered bridge
Gold Trader Flat & Yuba-Feather Historical Museum		Forbestown	Butte	Open air	Life-size replica 1870s-period mining town adjacent to the Yuba-Feather Historical Museum with exhibits of Maidu artifacts, pioneers, mining, Chinese workers
Gray Lodge Wildlife Area		Gridley	Butte	Natural history	website, 9,100-acre (37 km^{2}) protected wildlife viewing park with natural history museum, trails, wildlife observation hides
Greenville Cy Hall Memorial Museum		Greenville	Plumas	Local history	
Gridley Museum		Gridley	Butte	Local history	website, early families, farming, businesses
Heritage Junction Museum		McCloud	Siskiyou	Local history	
Indian Valley Museum		Taylorsville	Plumas	Local history	website, Maidu artifacts, pioneer items, gems and minerals, exhibits of early logging, farming, blacksmithing tools and equipment
Jake Jackson Memorial Museum		Weaverville	Trinity	Local history	website, firearms, mining, farming and ranching, transportation, native Americans and local Chinese history, operated by the Trinity County Historical Society
Janet Turner Print Museum		Chico	Butte	Art	website, part of California State University, Chico, fine art prints spanning six centuries
Jim Beckwourth Museum		Portola	Plumas	Biographical	Life of African American pioneer James Beckwourth
Kelly-Griggs House Museum		Red Bluff	Tehama	Historic house	Facebook site, Victorian period house
Klamath National Forest Interpretive Museum		Yreka	Siskiyou	Natural history	Located at the Supervisor's Office of the Klamath National Forest
Lassen Historical Museum		Susanville	Lassen	Local history	Includes Roop's Fort, operated by the Lassen County Historical Society
Lassen Volcanic National Park		Shasta County	Shasta	Natural history	Kohm Yah-mah-nee Visitor Center has interpretive exhibits and displays about the park
Loomis Museum		Shasta County	Shasta	Natural history	Located at Manzanita Lake in Lassen Volcanic National Park
Manton Museum		Manton	Tehama	Local history	
McCloud Heritage Junction Museum		McCloud	Siskiyou	Local history	Facebook site
Military Museum of Butte County		Oroville	Butte	Military	website, 20th-century military history, art, weapons, vehicles and memorabilia
Modoc County Historical Museum		Alturas	Modoc	Local history	Includes Native American and pioneer artifacts, household and business items
Mt. Shasta Sisson Museum		Mount Shasta	Siskiyou	Local history	website, includes exhibits on caving, sport angling, minerals, mountaineering, railroad and local history; located on the grounds of the fish hatchery
Museum of Northern California Art		Chico	Butte	Arts	website, promoting awareness of northern California artists through collections, exhibitions, and educational programs
National Yo-Yo Museum		Chico	Butte	Sports	website, world's largest display of yo-yos, hosts annual national contest
Oregon City School		Oregon City	Butte	Education	Historic school, operated by the Butte County Historical Society
Oroville Chinese Temple		Oroville	Butte	Ethnic	1863 temple complex with rooms for Taoism, Confucianism, and Buddhism, tapestries, art, folk art, puppets and gardens
Paradise Depot Museum		Paradise	Butte	Industry	website, railroad and logging museum
Patrick Ranch Museum		Durham	Butte	Agriculture	website, 19th-century ranch house with public farm and ranching activities
Plumas County Museum		Quincy	Plumas	Local history	website, website, exhibits include Maidu baskets, railroad, gold mining and timber industries, art, dolls, natural history and Chinese influence collections
Plumas-Eureka State Park		Blairsden	Plumas	Mining	Gold mining buildings
Scott Museum		Trinity Center	Trinity	Local history	Includes Native American artifacts, models of transportation
Shasta State Historic Park		Shasta	Shasta	Open-air	Historic ghost town, courthouse museum with local history exhibits
Siskiyou Arts Museum		Dunsmuir	Siskiyou	Art	website, works of noted regional and national artists
Siskiyou County Museum		Yreka	Siskiyou	Local history	website, operated by the Siskiyou County Historical Society, exhibits include Native Americans, trappers, gold mining, Chinese, pioneers, timber, weapons, period rooms
Stansbury House		Chico	Butte	Historic house	website, Victorian period house
Stirling City Museum		Stirling City	Butte	Local history	website, operated by the Stirling City Historical Society
Susanville Railroad Depot		Susanville	Lassen	Local history	Operated by the Lassen Land & Trails Trust, area railroad, logging and local history
Tehama County Museum		Tehama	Tehama	Natural history	website
Tulelake-Butte Valley Fair Museum of Local History		Tulelake	Siskiyou	Local history	website, located at the Tulelake-Butte Valley Fairgrounds
Turtle Bay Exploration Park		Redding	Shasta	Multiple	Botanical garden, museum with exhibits about local natural history, cultural history, science and art
Valene L. Smith Museum of Anthropology		Chico	Butte	Anthropology	website, part of California State University, Chico
Weaverville Joss House State Historic Park		Weaverville	Trinity	Religious	1874 Taoist temple and Chinese artifacts
Weed Historic Lumber Town Museum		Weed	Siskiyou	Local history	website, household artifacts, tools, antique transportation and machines
Western Pacific Railroad Museum		Portola	Plumas	Railroad	Over 35 locomotives and 80 railroad cars
Westwood Museum		Westwood	Lassen	Local history	Facebook site
William B. Ide Adobe State Historic Park		Red Bluff	Tehama	Historic house	Mid 19th century adobe house, replica blacksmith shop and ranch outbuildings
Williams House Museum		Portola	Plumas	Local history	1931 log home, exhibits on local family history, area lumber, mining and railroad industries

== Defunct museums ==
- South Shasta Model Railroad, Gerber
