= Florida Keys Eco-Discovery Center =

Coordinates: 24.5507°N 81.80721°W

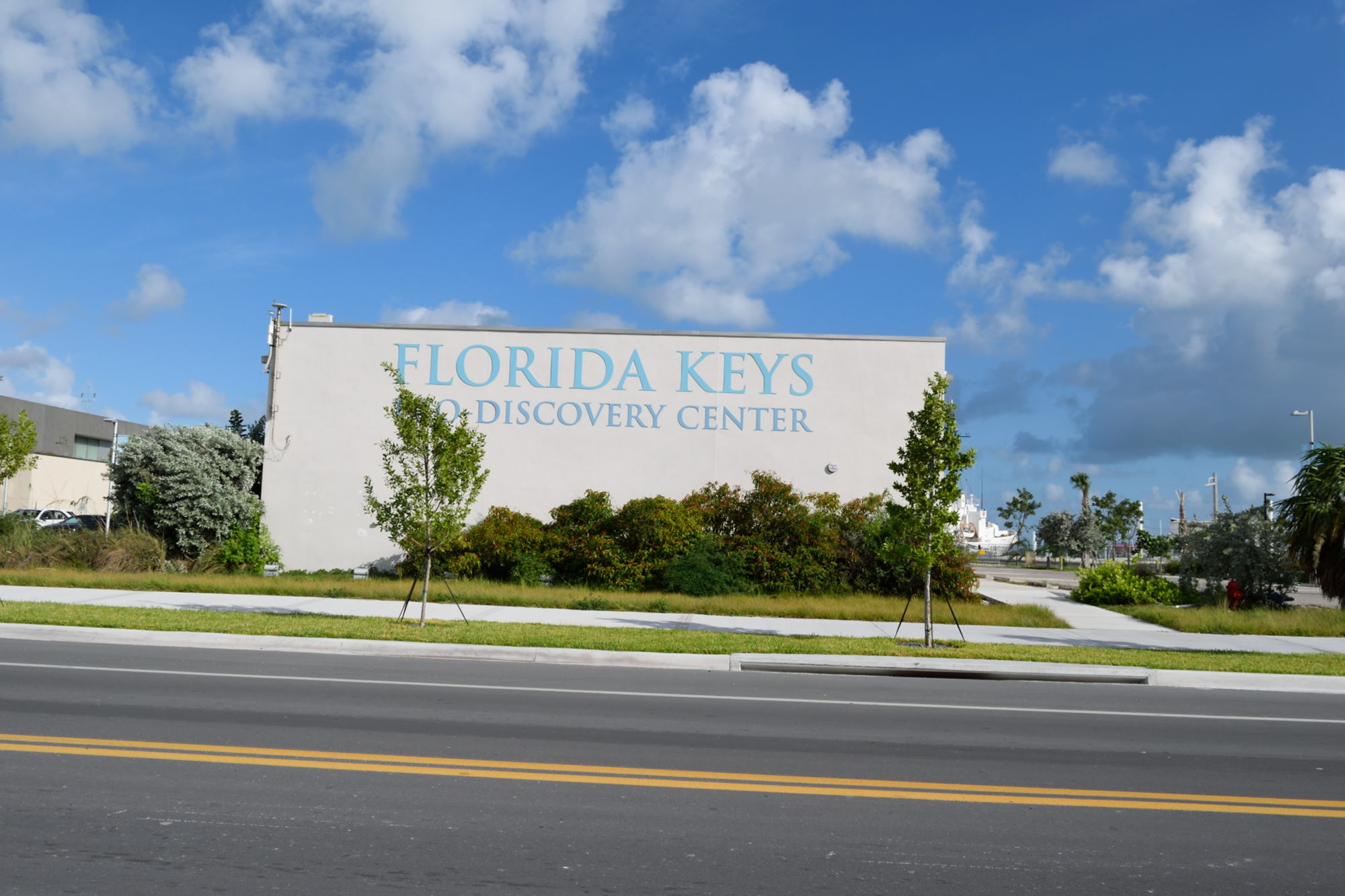
Florida Keys Eco-Discovery Center, exterior view, August 2017

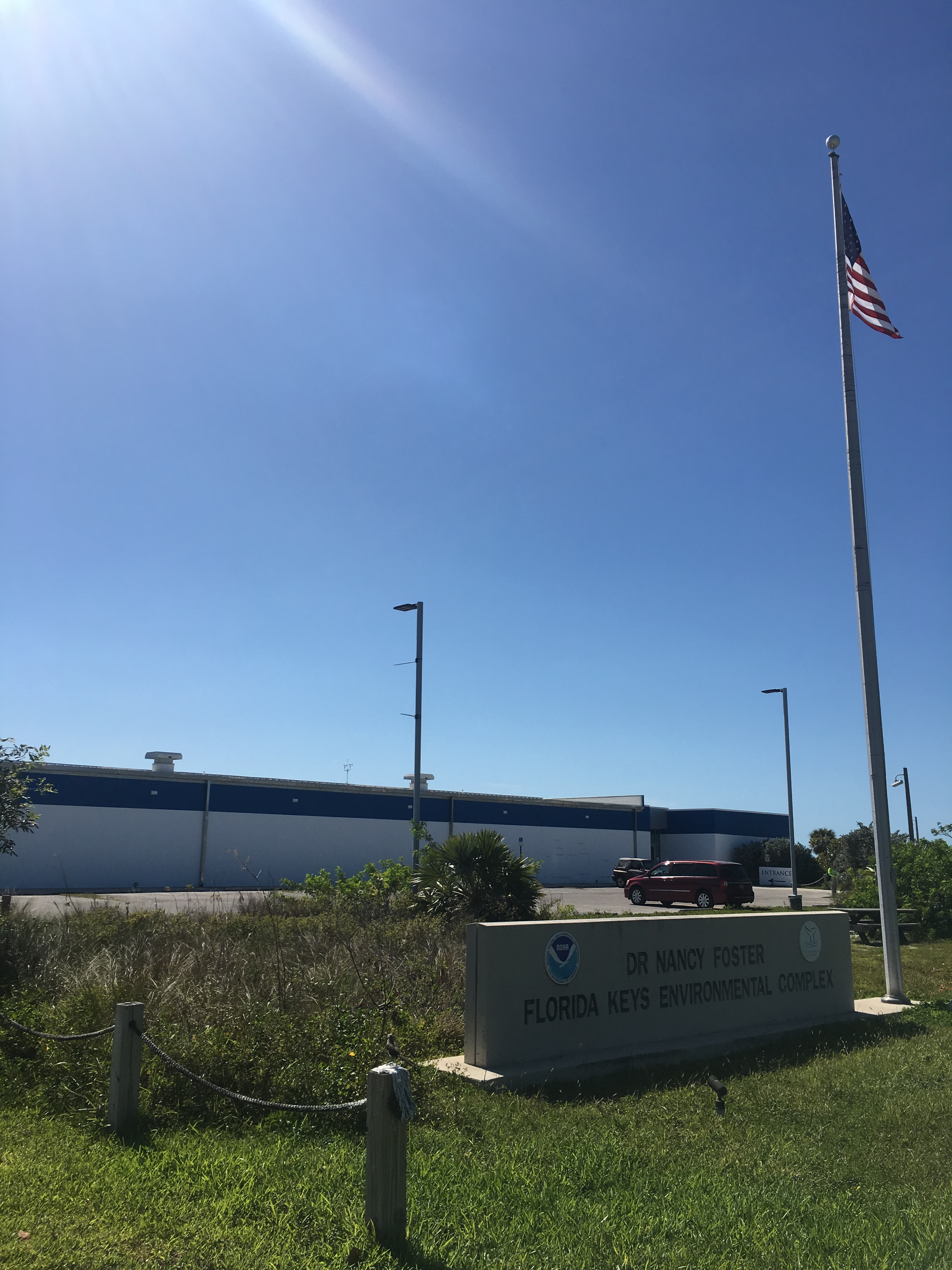
Florida Keys Eco-Discovery Center, exterior view, March 2019

The Florida Keys Eco-Discovery Center is a natural history museum in Key West. Its exhibits cover the plants and animals of the Florida Keys National Marine Sanctuary. It is operated by Florida Keys National Marine Sanctuary, NOAA, the South Florida Water Management District, Everglades National Park, Dry Tortugas National Park, the National Wildlife Refuges of the Florida Keys and Eastern National. Admission is free.

== See also ==
- List of museums in Florida
