= Schisler Museum of Wildlife & Natural History and McMunn Planetarium =

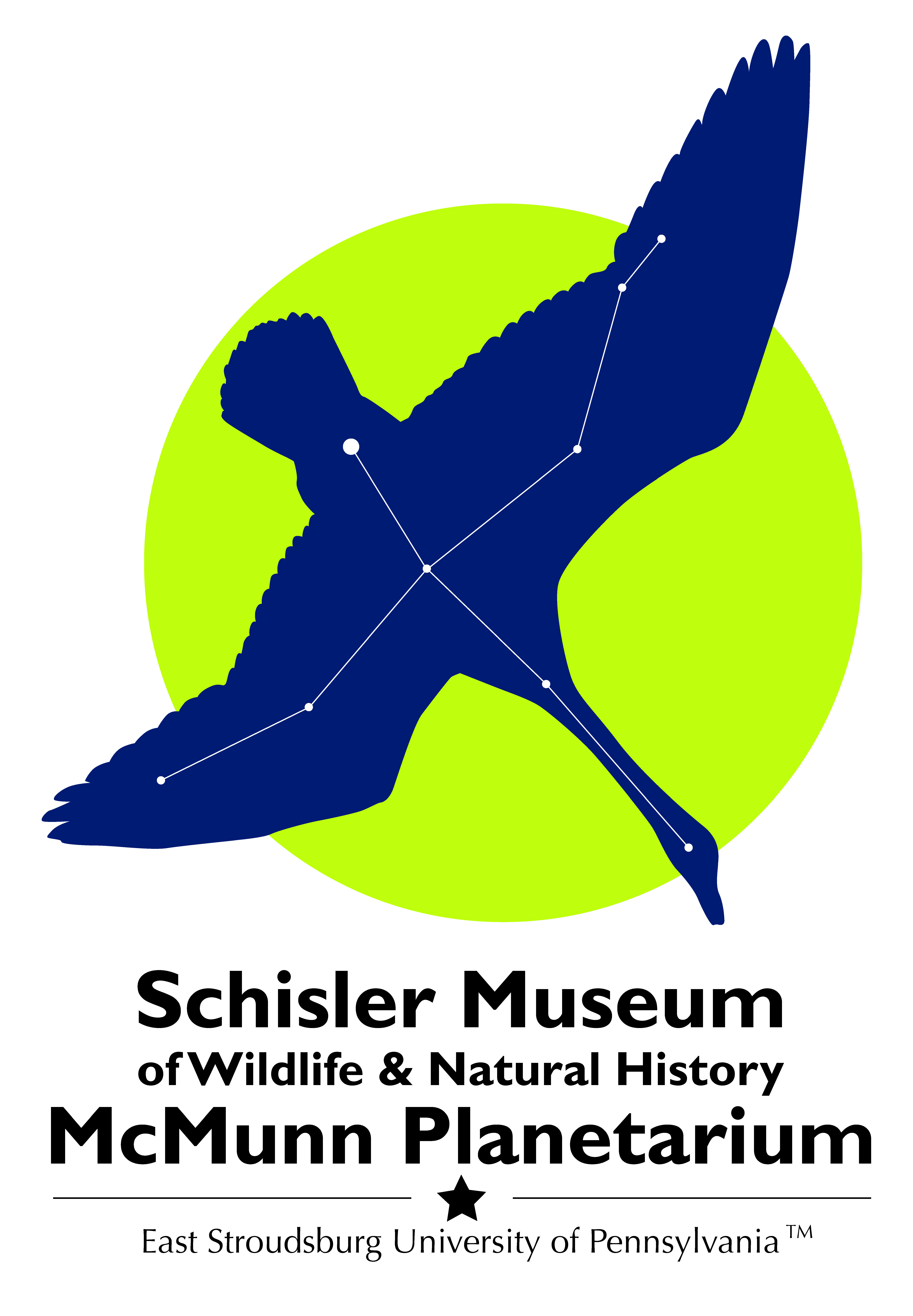

- Location of East Stroudsburg, PA
- Established: 15 November 2013
- Location: East Stroudsburg, Pennsylvania
- Coordinates: 40.996284°N 75.175825°W
- Type: Natural history museum and Planetarium
- Collections: Taxidermy
- Collection size: 130+
- Founder: East Stroudsburg University
- Public transit access: Monroe County Transit Authority
- Parking: On-site
- Website: quantum.esu.edu/museum/

The Schisler Museum of Wildlife & Natural History is a museum at East Stroudsburg University of Pennsylvania. It features habitat recreations that display and interpret more than 130 wildlife specimens from around the world. These specimens represent species from Africa and North America, including every species of North American deer and a comprehensive assortment of North American duck species. The museum also includes a display of insects from around the world and a Delaware River aquarium.

The McMunn Planetarium is a planetarium at East Stroudsburg University of Pennsylvania. It features a SPITZ digital projection system that can show pre-produced videos as well as custom star shows. In addition to public shows, the planetarium serves as a classroom space for East Stroudsburg University science courses.

The Schisler Museum of Wildlife & Natural History and McMunn Planetarium are located on the ground floor of the Warren E. '55 and Sandra Hoeffner Science and Technology Center at East Stroudsburg University, a Member of the Pennsylvania State System of Higher Education.

== Founding ==
The Schisler Museum was named after Arthur (1962) and Fannie Greene (1962) Schisler, alumni of East Stroudsburg University, who donated most of the taxidermic mounts on display. The museum was completed in 2013 and was available to school groups on a limited basis until opening to the general public in 2016.

The McMunn Planetarium was founded in 2008 and named in honor of East Stroudsburg University alumni supporters Charles A. "Tony" (1969) and Patricia Lythgoe (1968) McMunn.

== Gallery of Museum Images ==
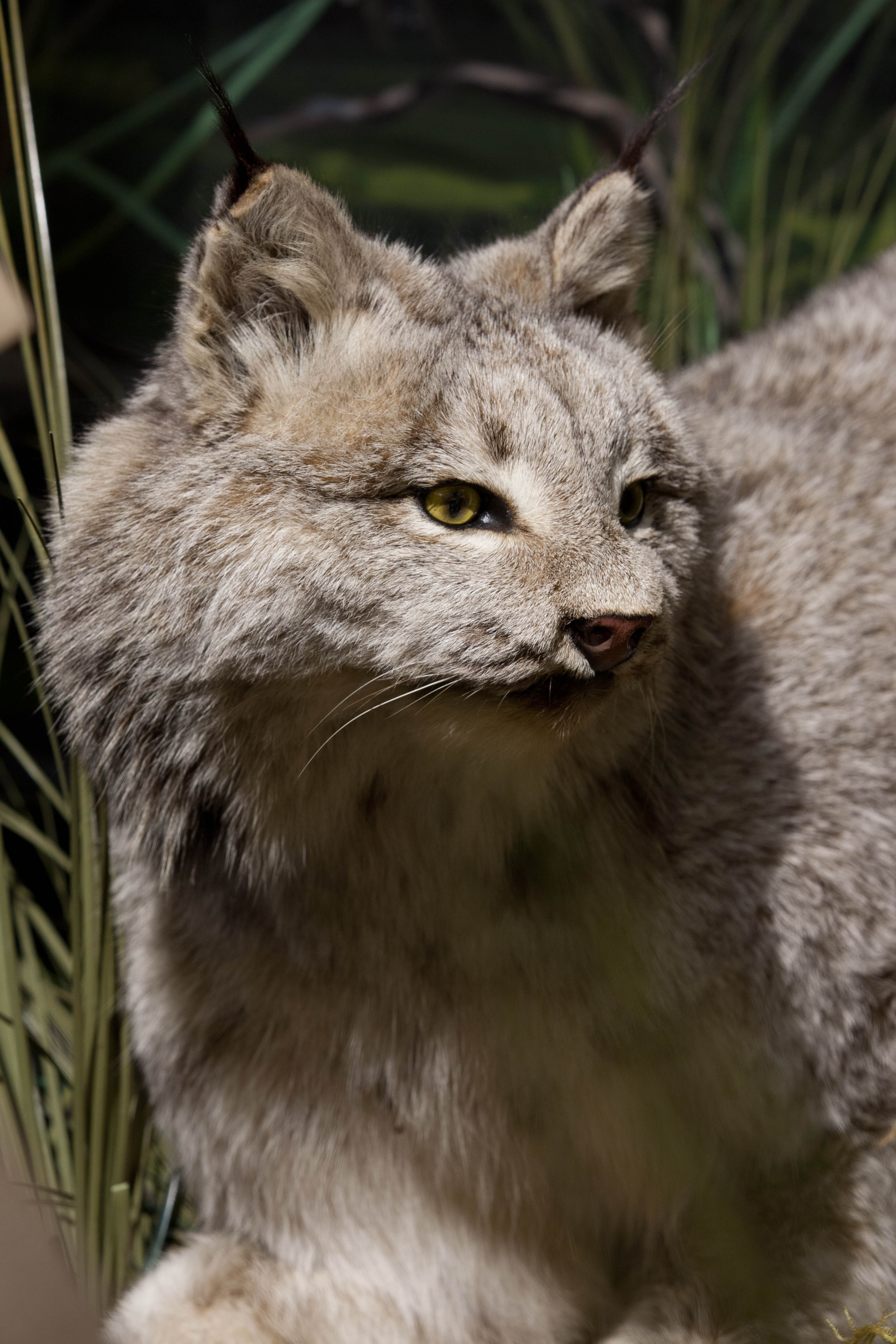
Canadian lynx

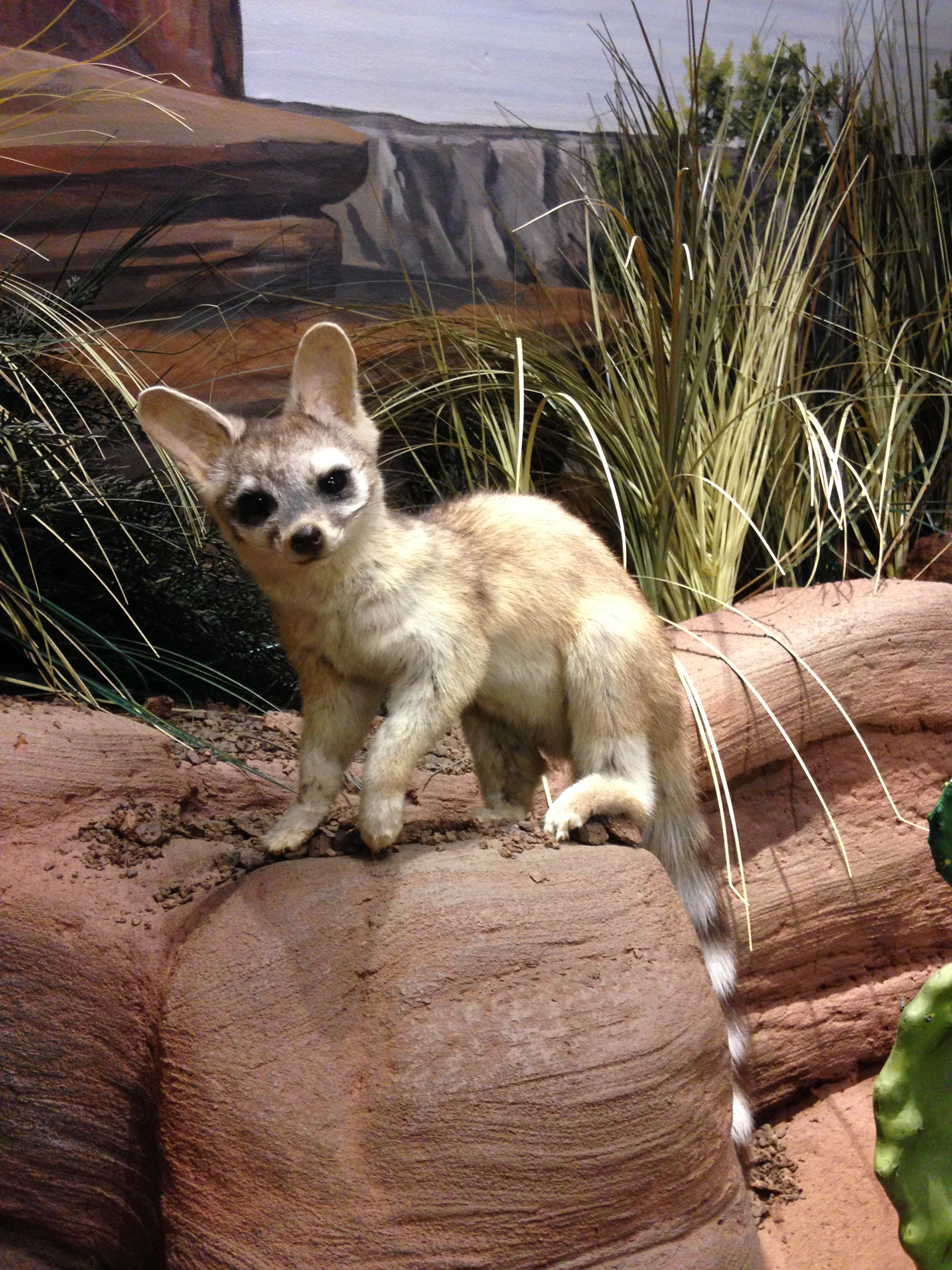
Ringtail cat

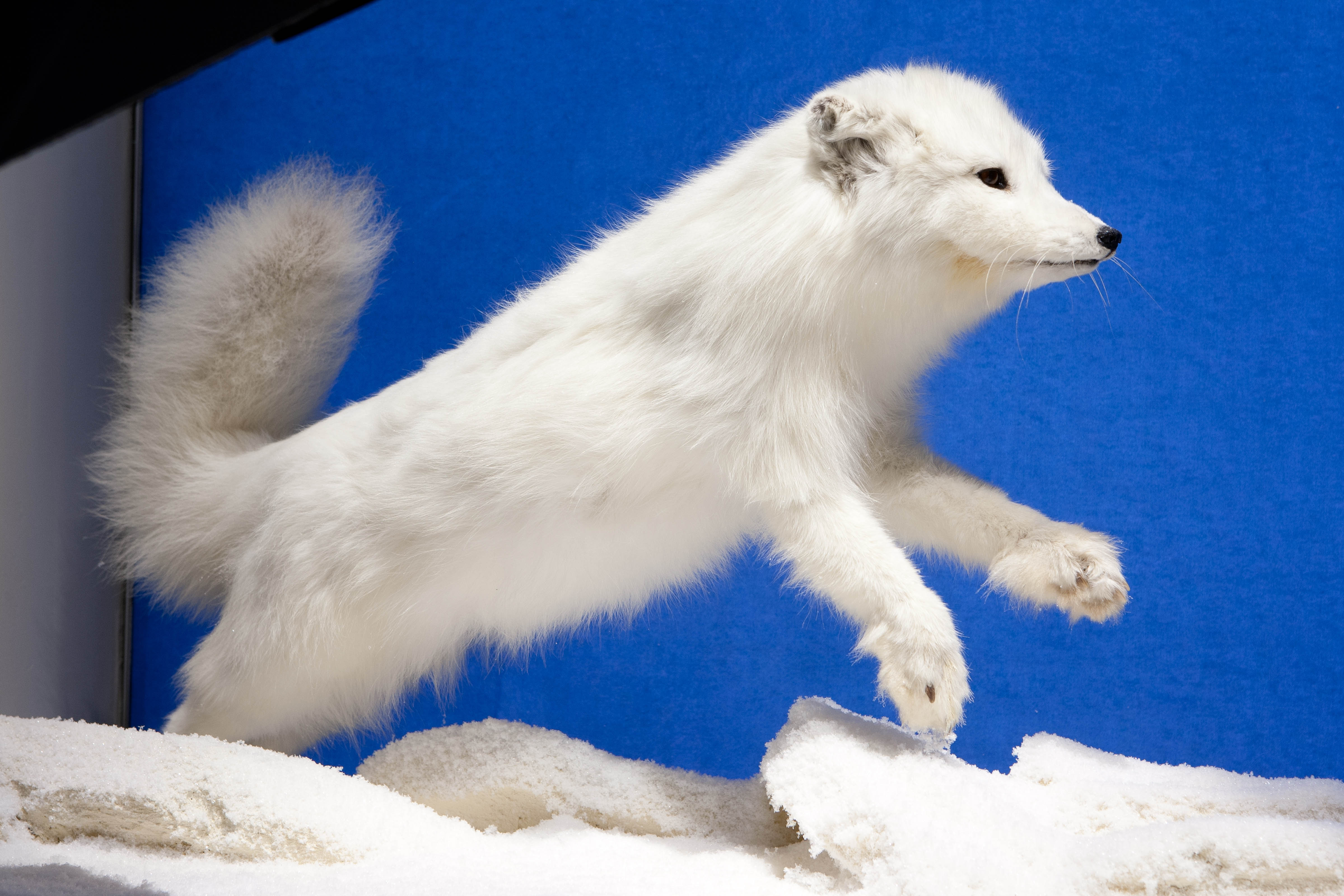
Arctic fox

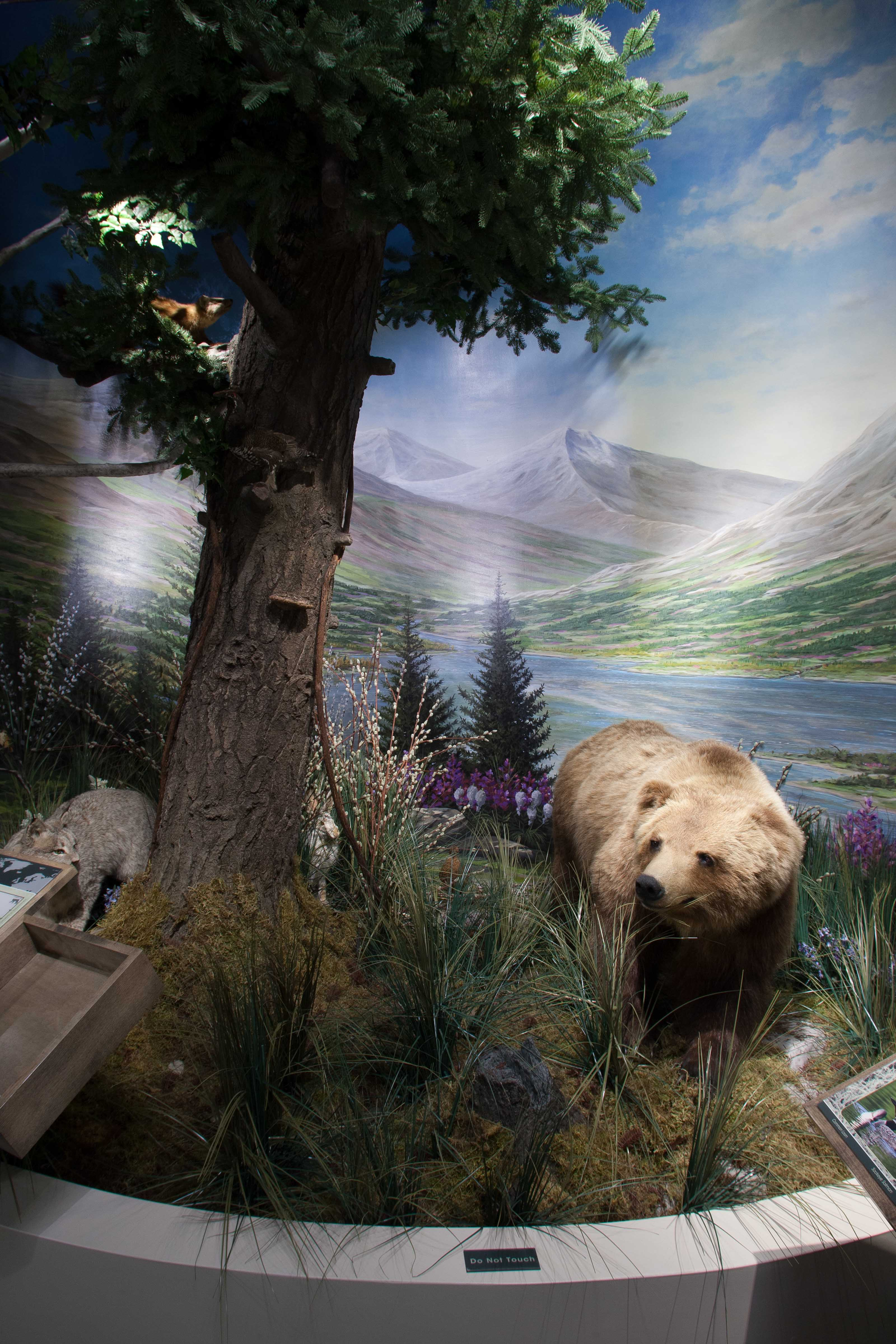
Canadian diorama

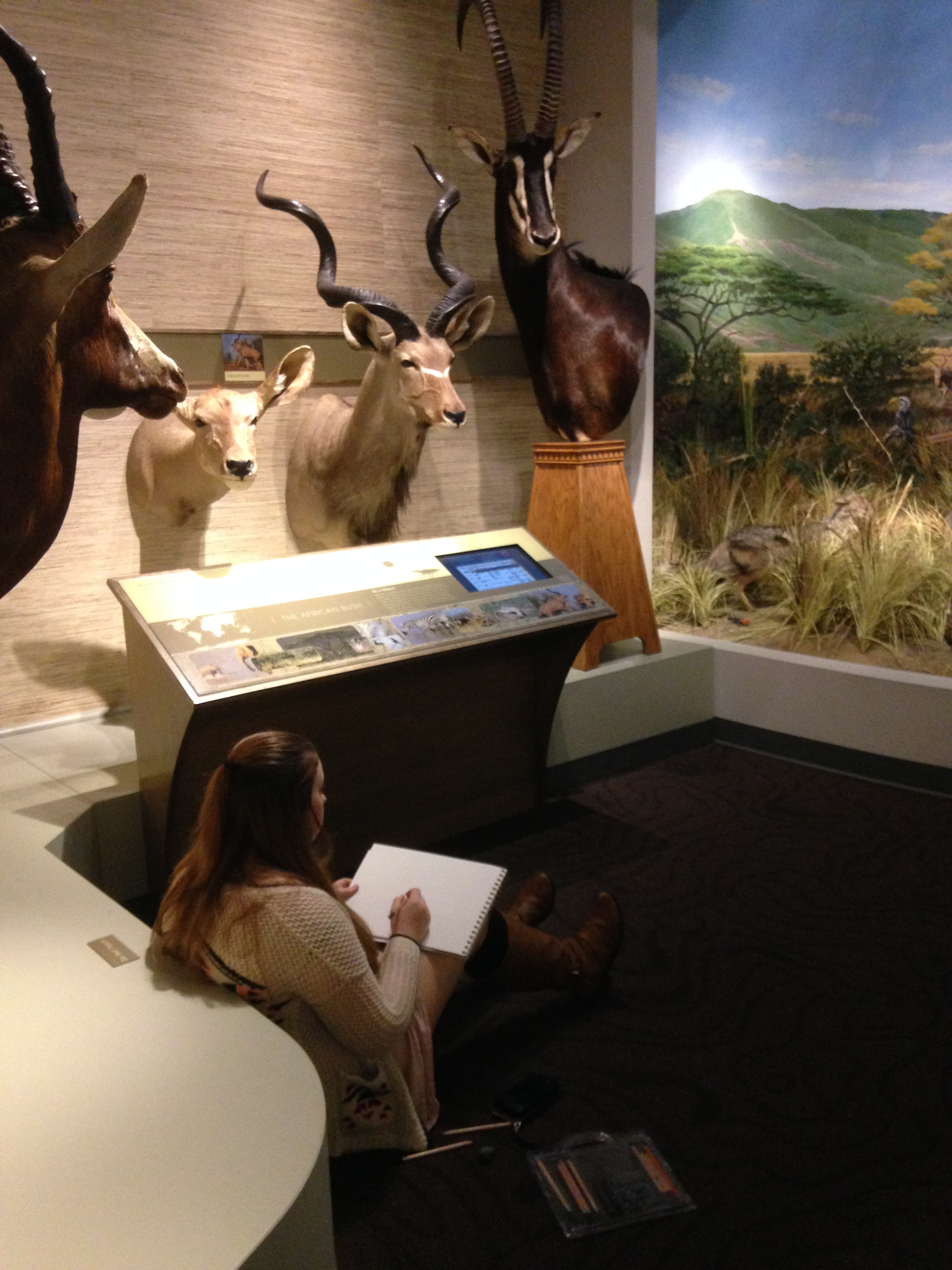
Art student sketching

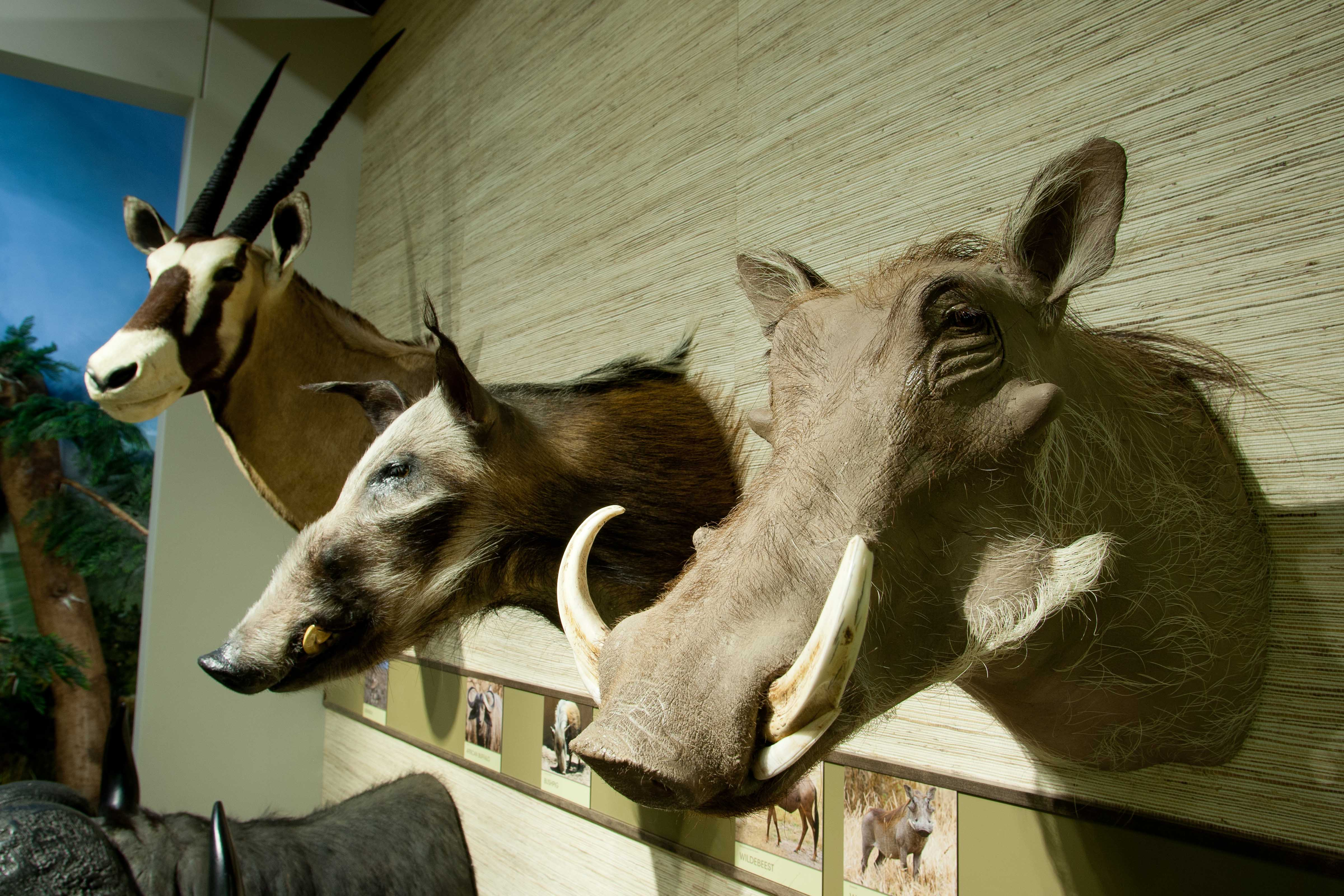
African mammals

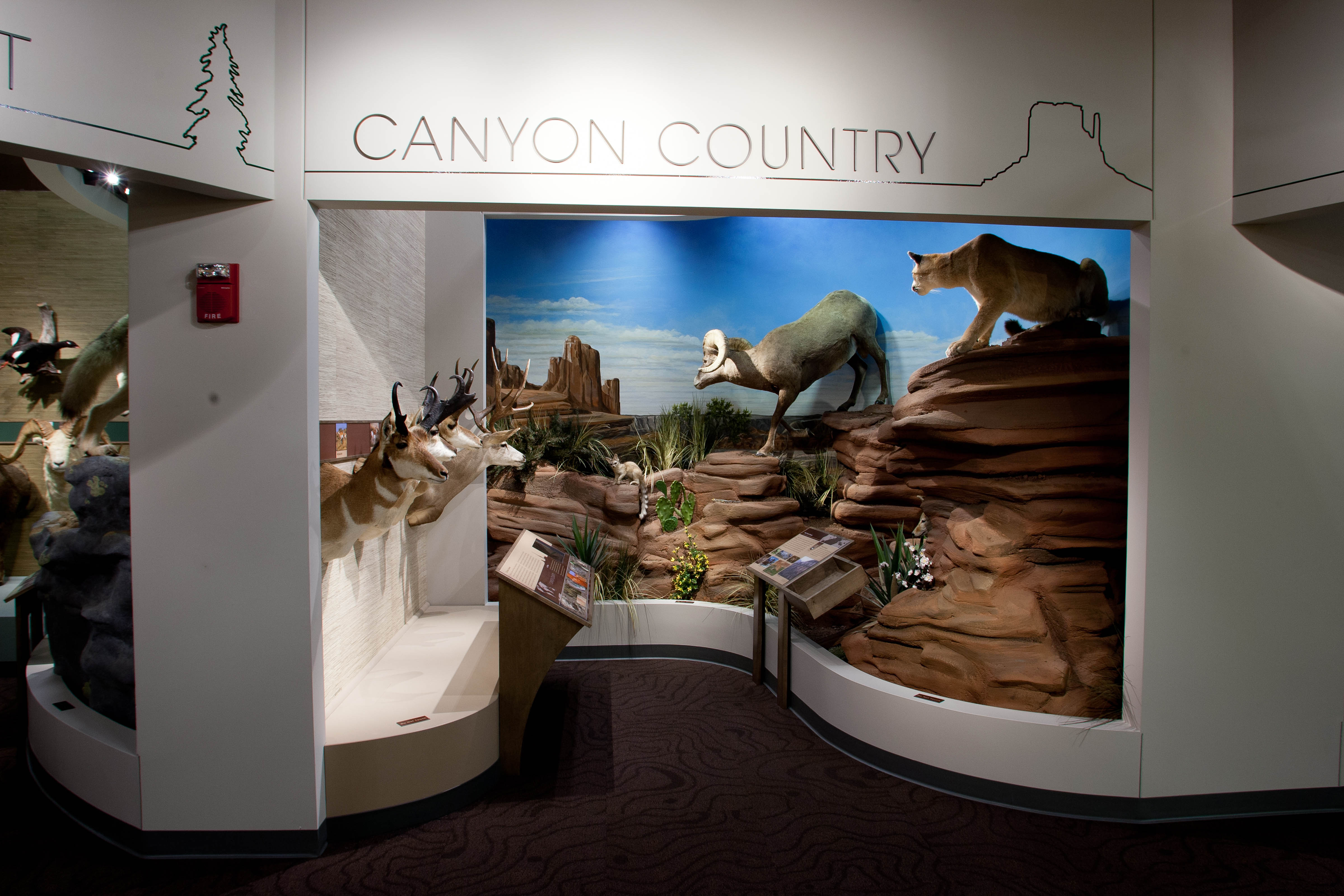
Diorama of North American west

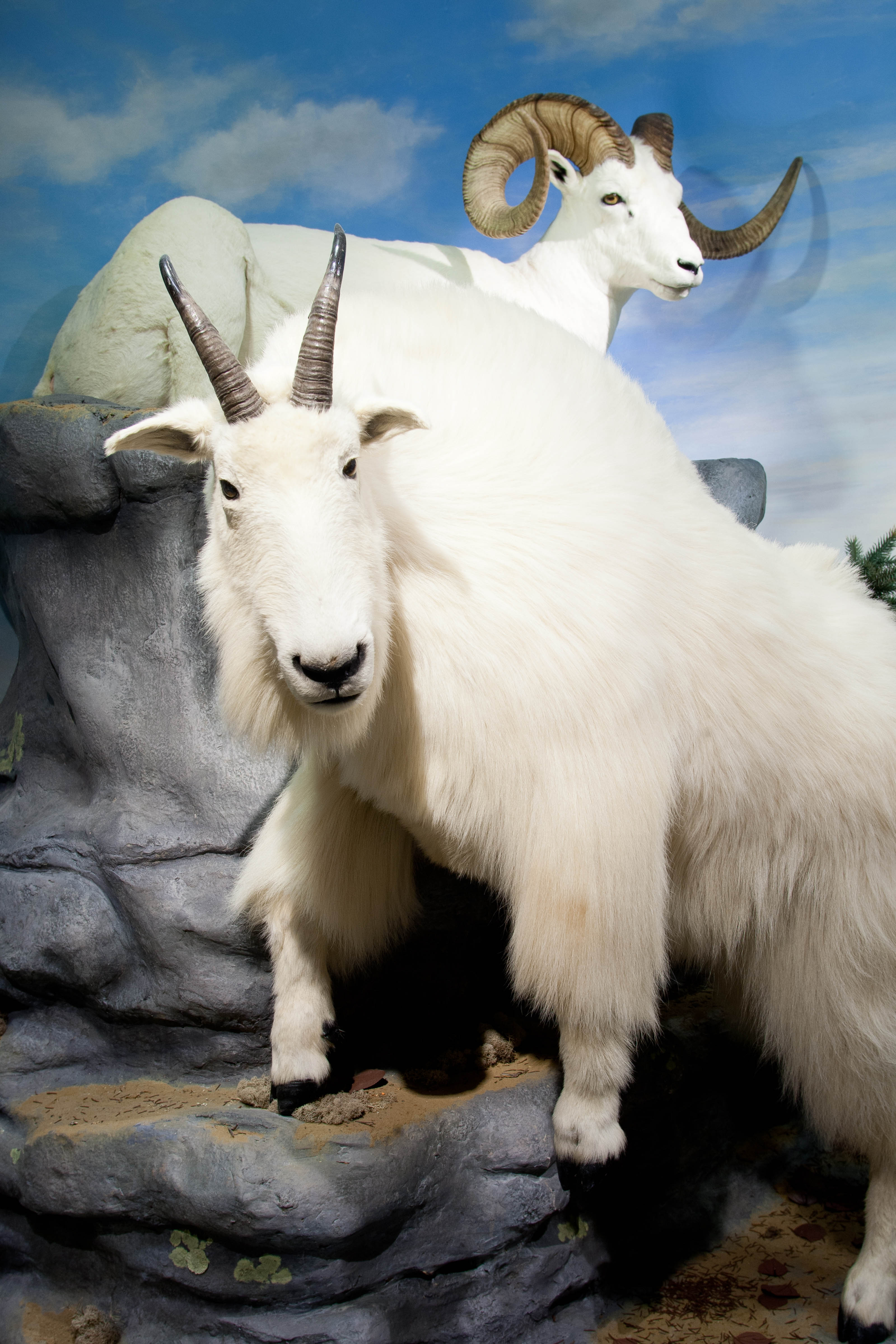
Dall sheep and mountain goat on exhibit

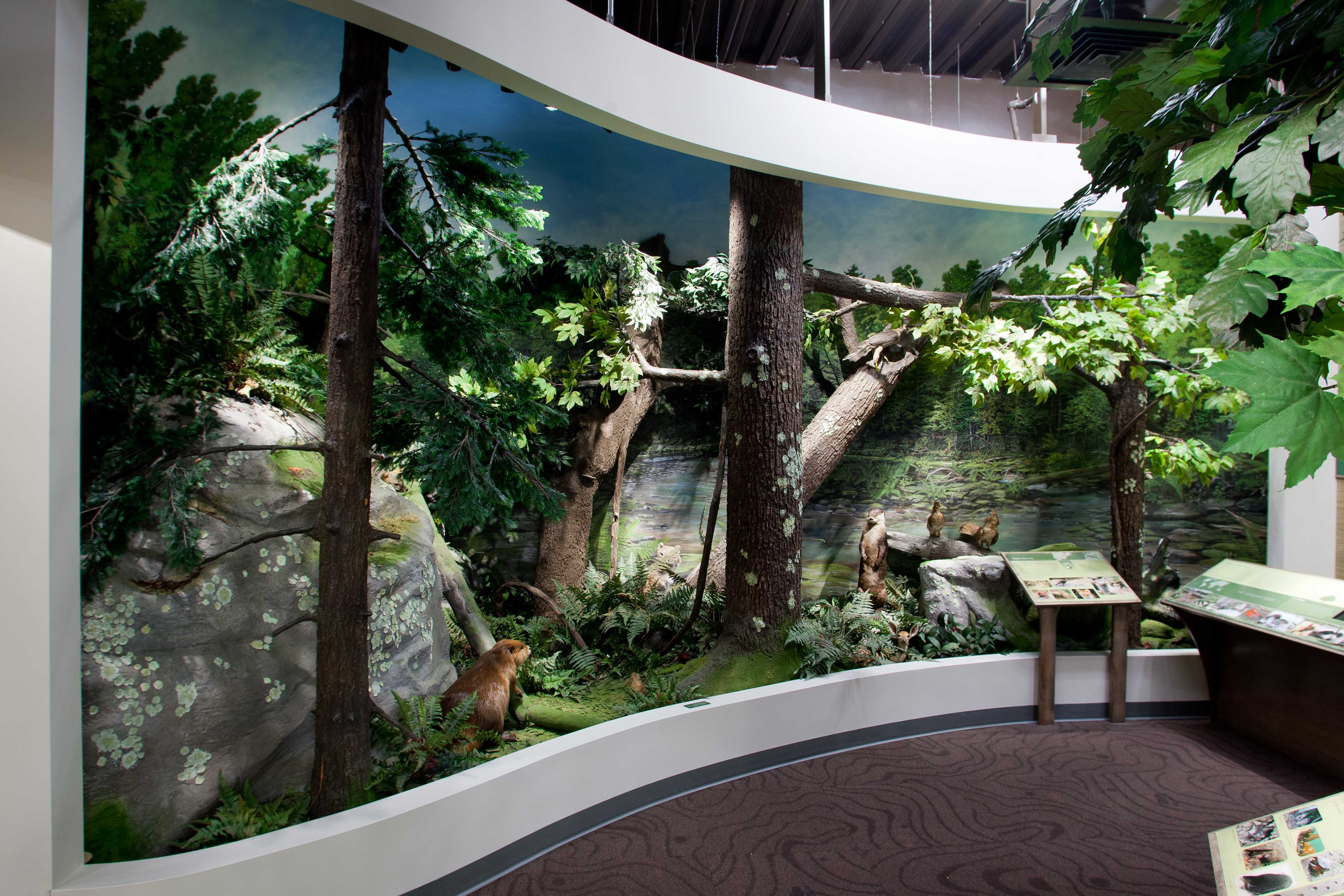
Delaware Water Gap diorama

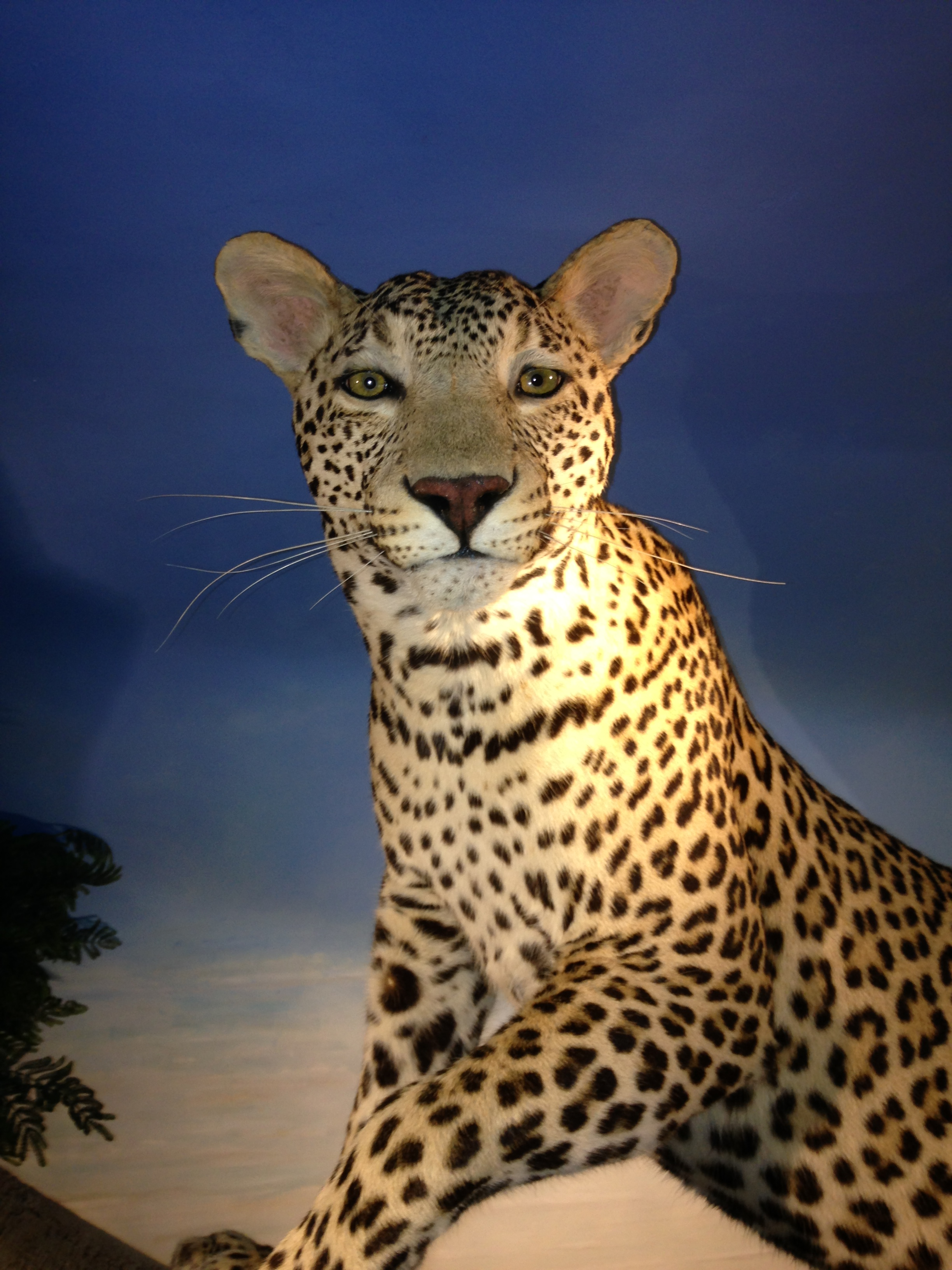
Leopard in museum display

== Gallery of Planetarium Images ==
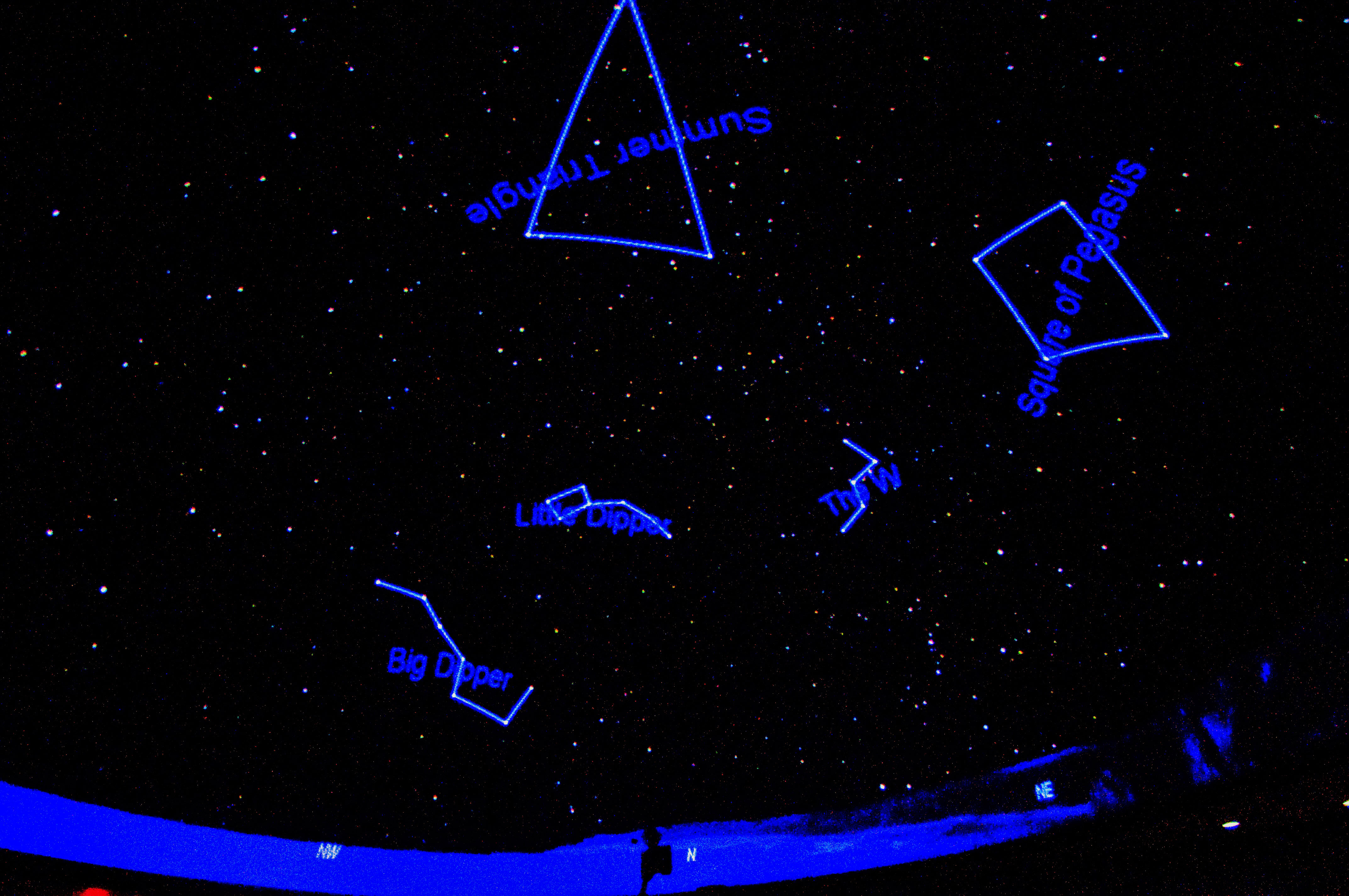
Constellations

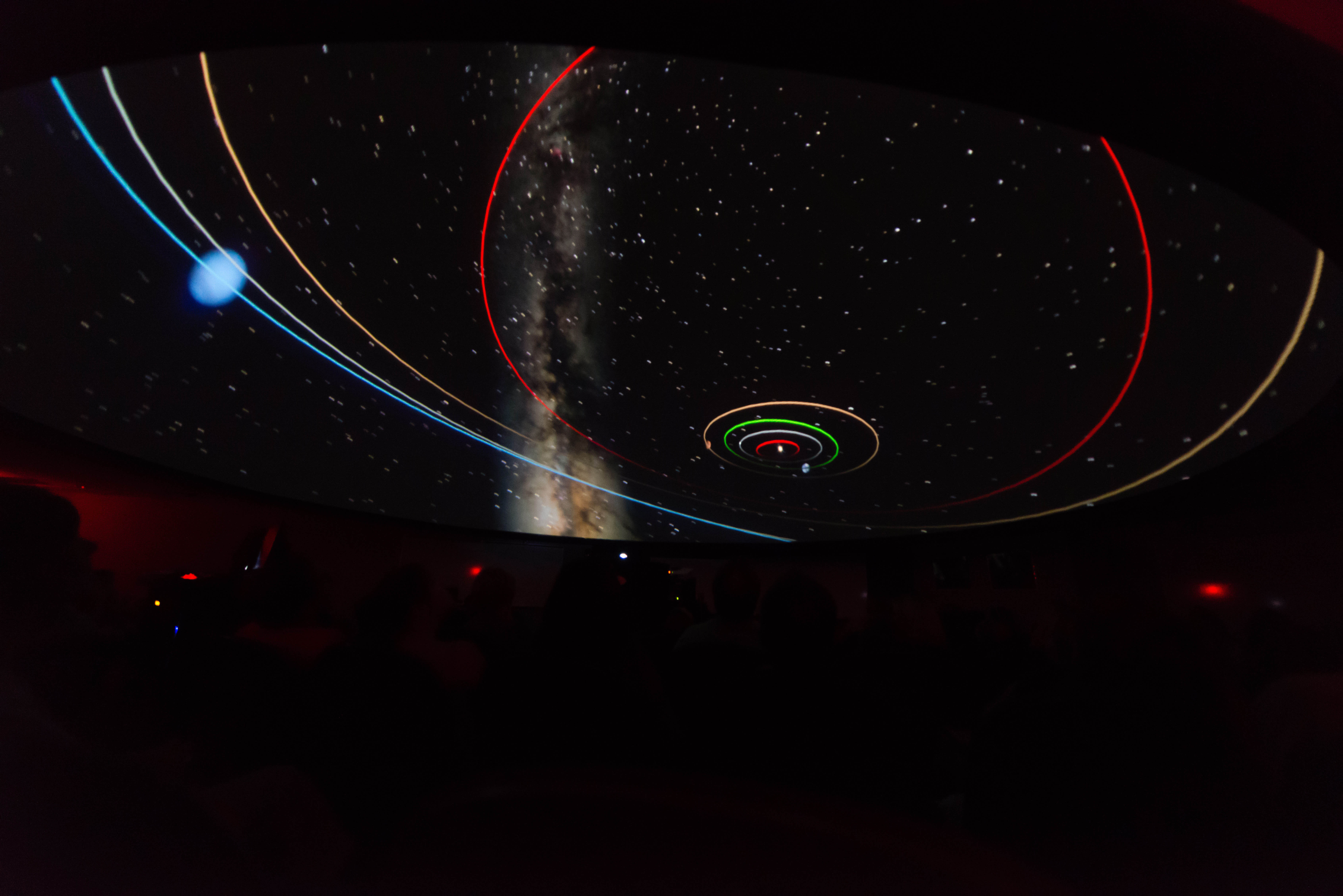
Planetary orbits

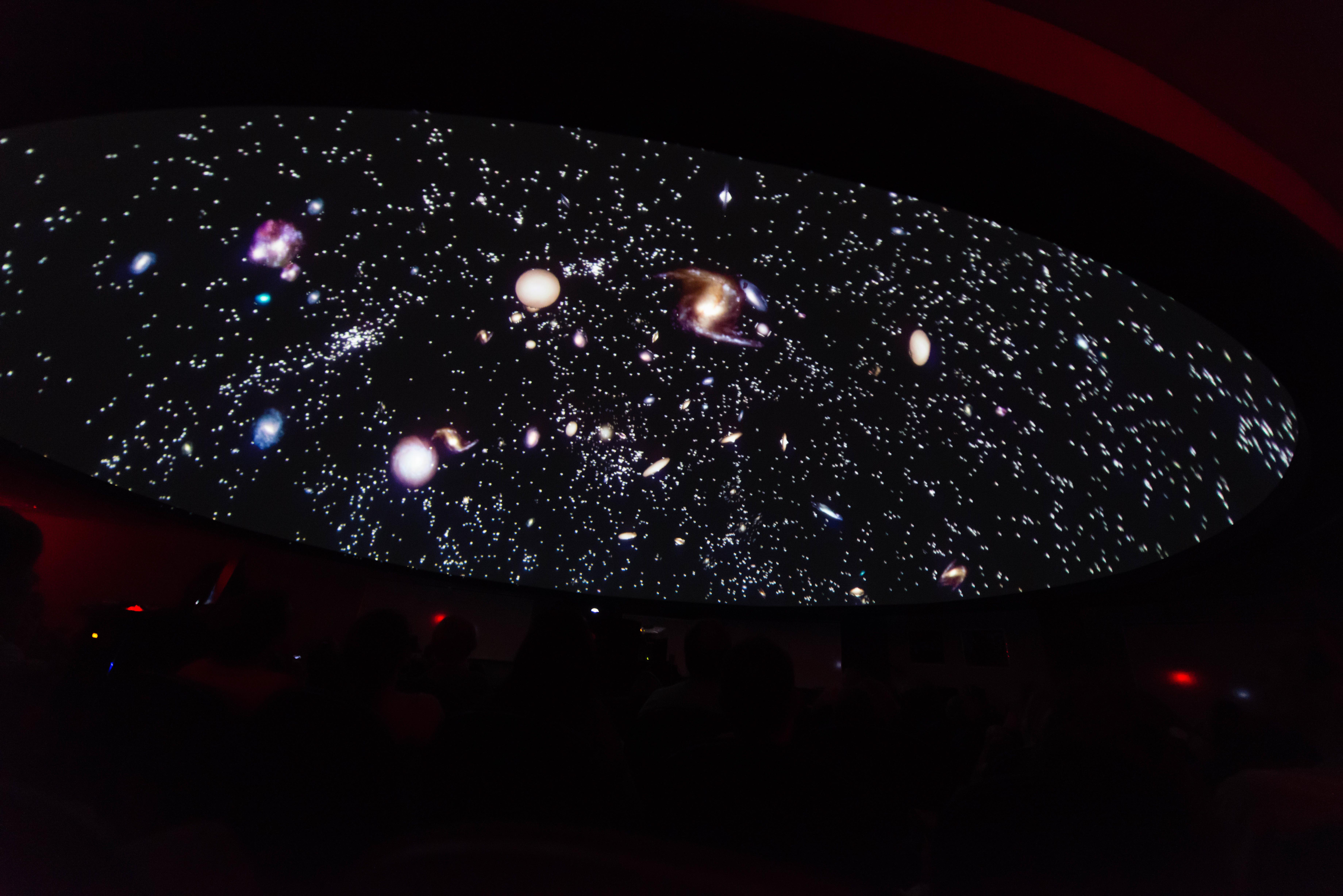
Starfield

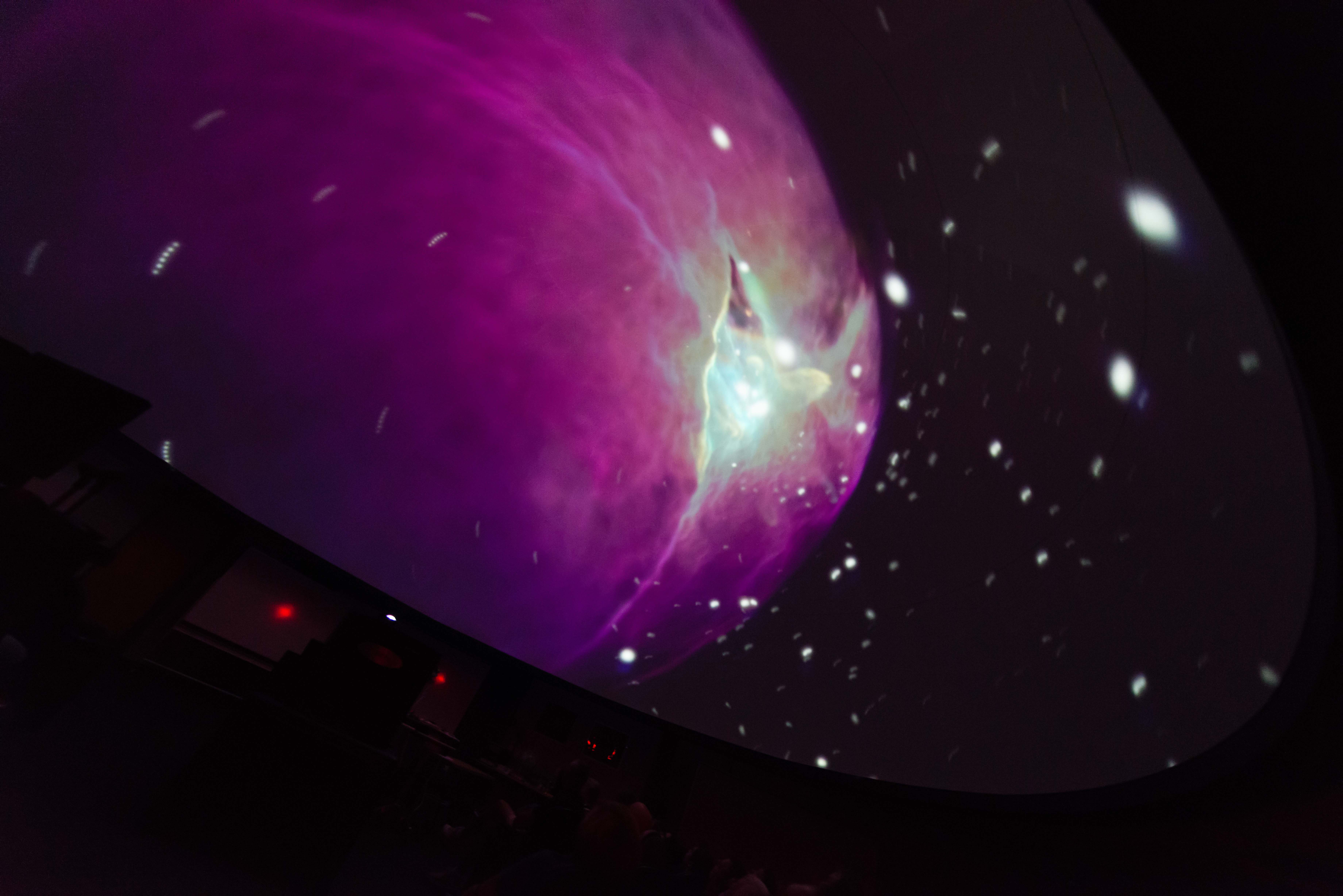
Stellar cloud

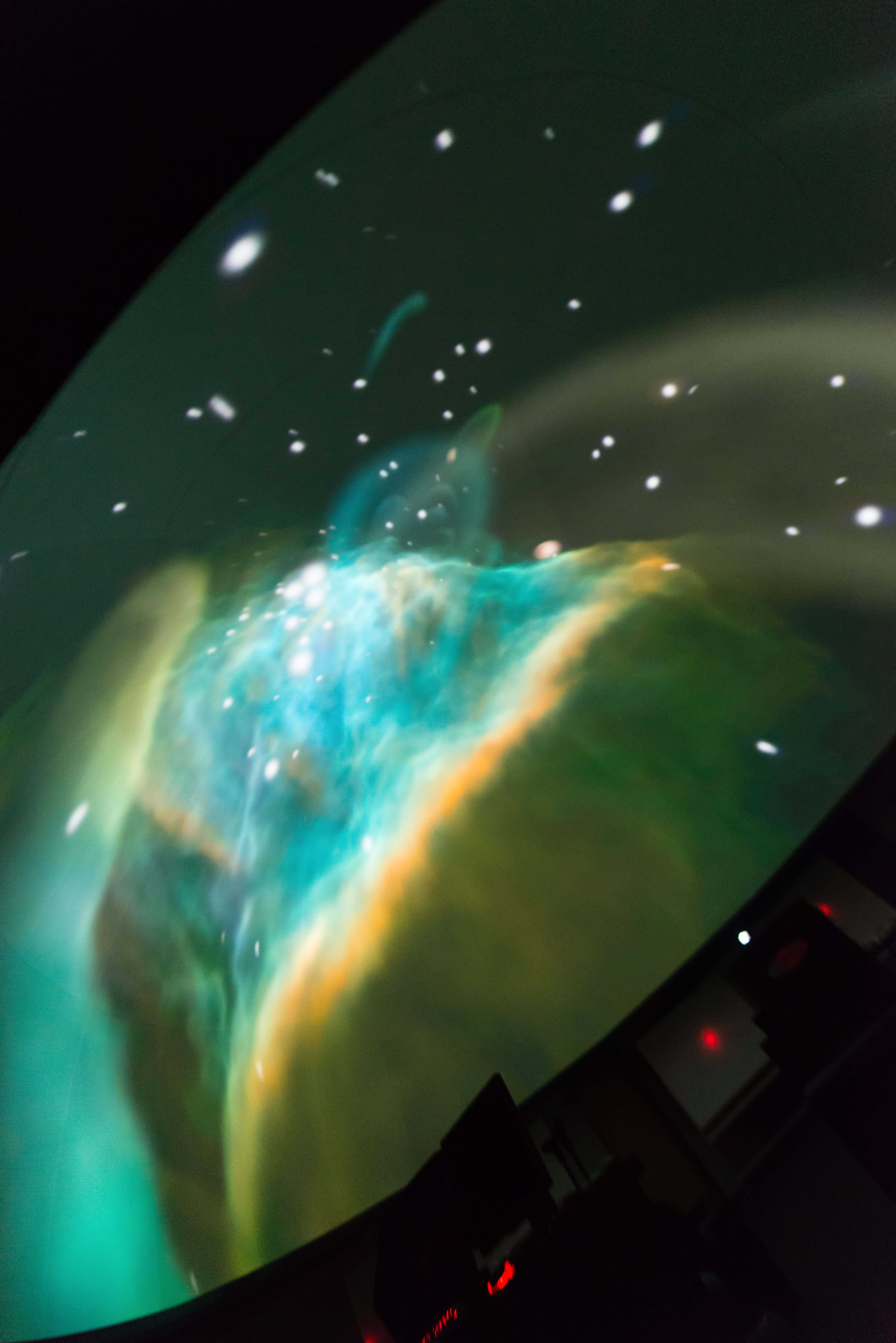
Gas cloud

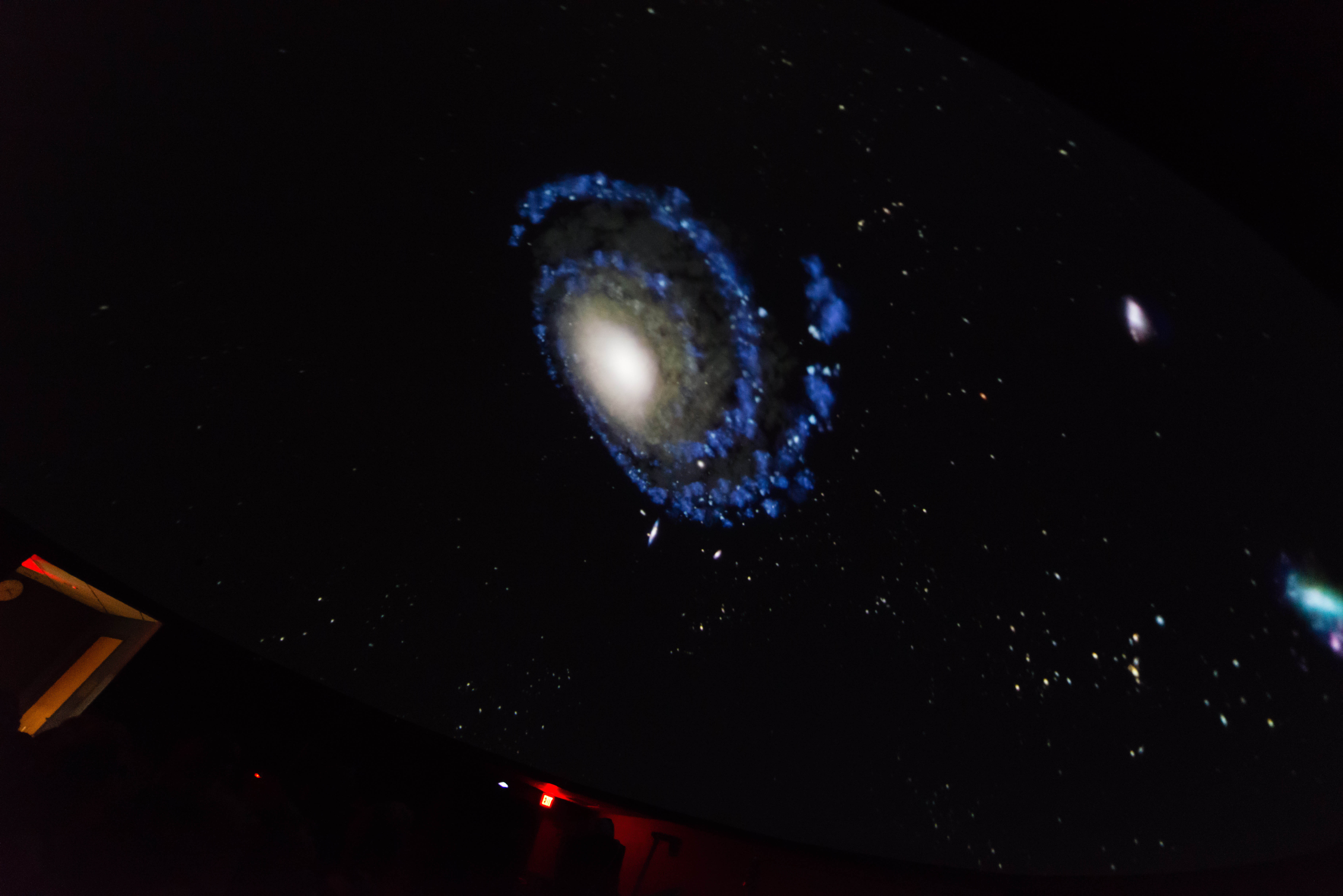
Galaxy

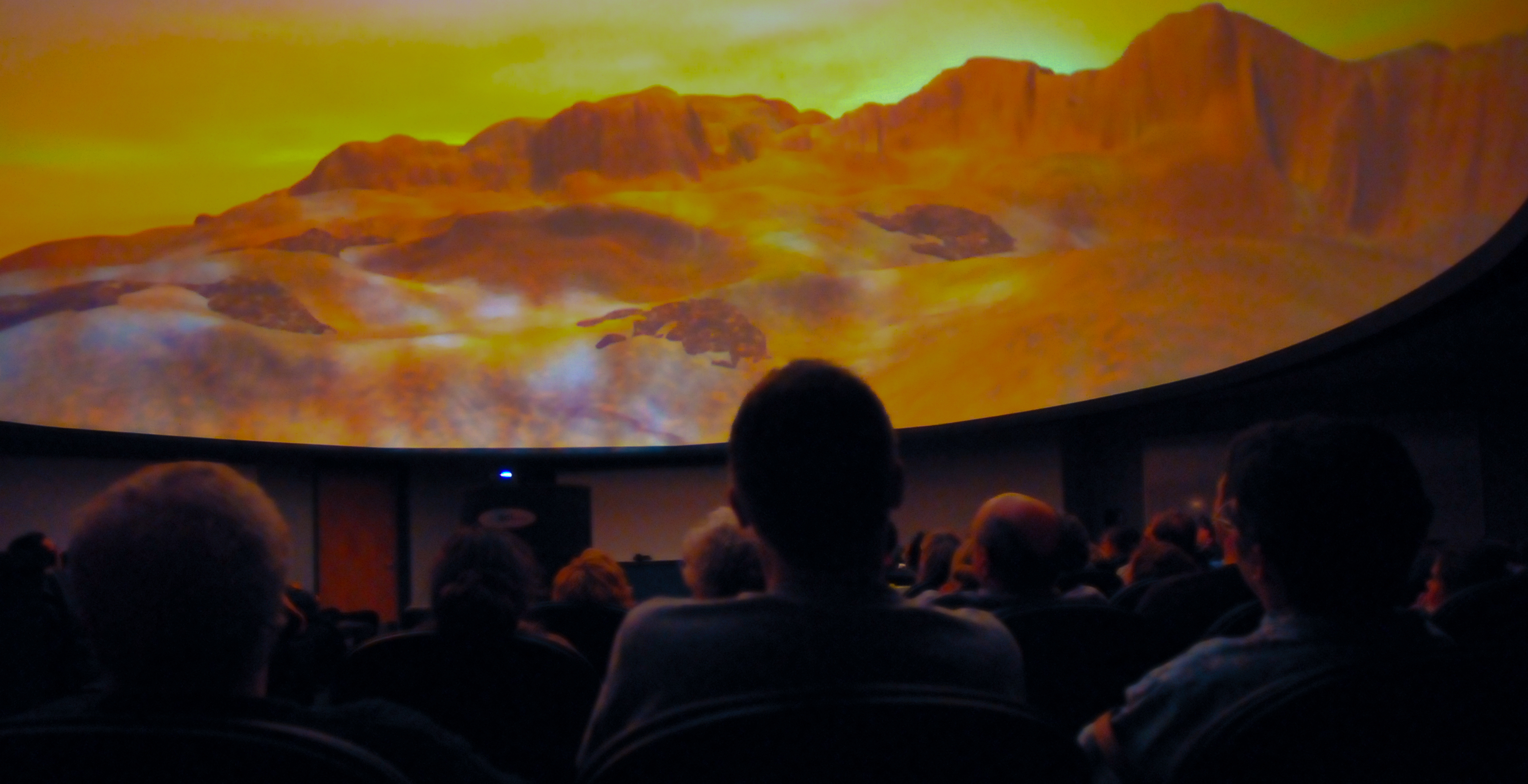
Martian landscape

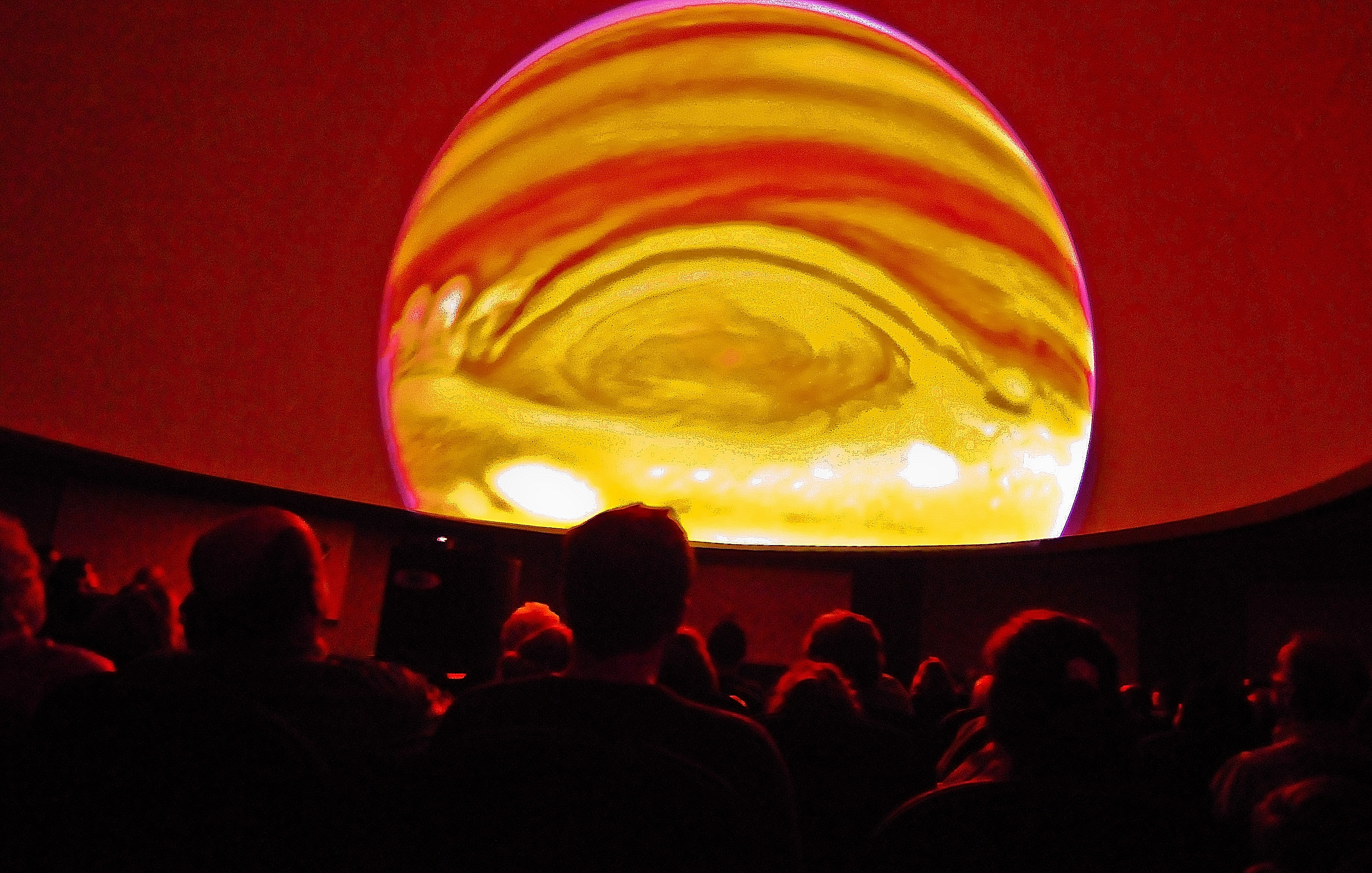
Red giant

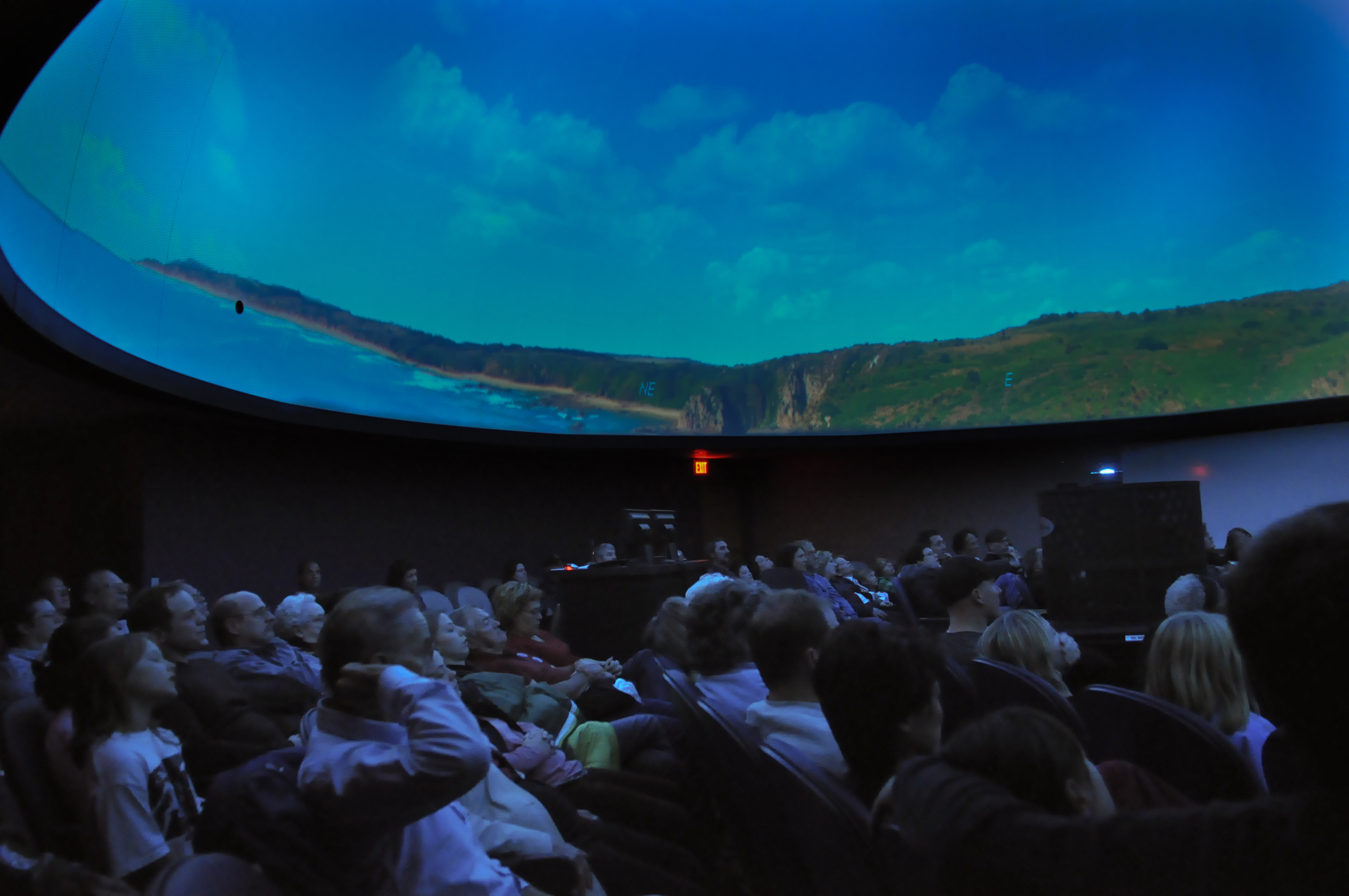
Earth's horizon

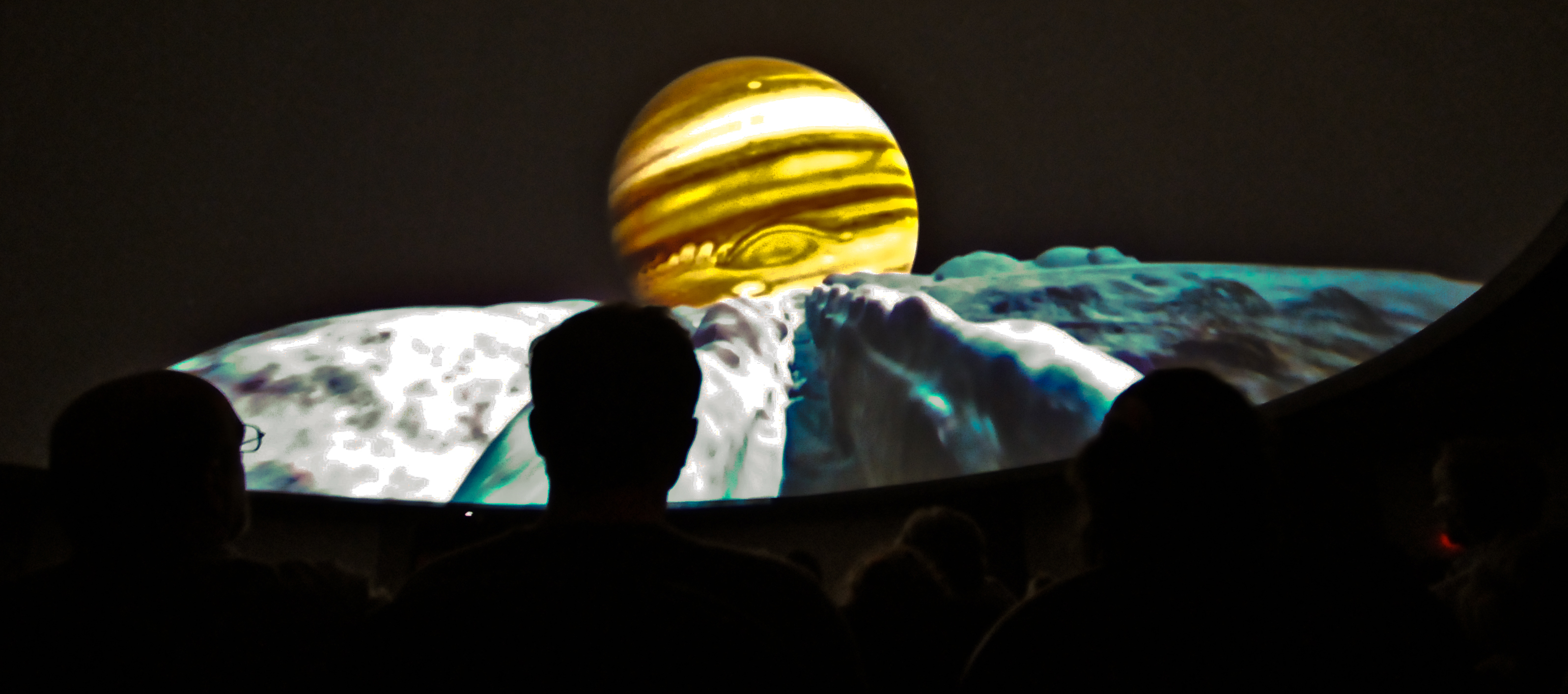
Planet rising over moon's horizon
