= Niagara Science Museum =

Coordinates: 43.1209°N 79.0442°W

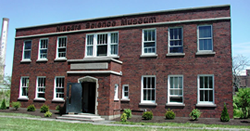
- The Museum is housed in the 1910 former Union Carbide Building.
- Established: 2009
- Location: 3625 Highland Ave. Niagara Falls, New York 14305 United States
- Type: Science museum
- Director: Nick Dalacu

The Niagara Science Museum was a science museum in Niagara Falls, New York which ran from 2009 to 2016. The museum's mission was to demonstrate the history of scientific discovery through the preservation, restoration, and demonstration of the scientific instruments and technologies. The Niagara Science Museum housed a collection of over 2,000 scientific instruments and technologies dating from the 1700s to the 21st century. The museum closed in December 2016.

== Overview ==
The Niagara Science Museum was founded by Nick Dalacu, a physicist who amassed a personal collection of hundreds of historically significant instruments and technologies over four decades. The museum presents its collection in 'living laboratories' in the style of the wunderkammern, or cabinet of curiosity, of Renaissance Europe. Its dozen rooms include laboratories dedicated to high-voltage electronics and galvanometers, a large collection of microscopes and optics, meteorological instruments, communication and media technologies, hydraulics and vacuum technologies, medical technologies, computing history, and others. It also houses the Charlie Troutman Printing Press Room, a working letterpress studio using a 1914 Chandler & Price press. The museum is housed in the former Union Carbide building, built in 1910, and restored to house the museum's collection, and is currently powered by an array of solar cells on its roof.

The museum has offered public demonstrations of its collection, including as a part of Atlas Obscura's Obscura Day in 2010 and 2011, visits from regional schools, and has been invited to exhibit artifacts from its collection at the University at Buffalo and Buffalo State College. The museum is also open to the public for visits.

In 2010, the museum received a large donation of historically significant artifacts from the early days of electrical production.

In 2011, the Niagara Science Museum was certified as a not-for-profit educational corporation with a charter by the Board of Regents of the State University of New York.
