= Slovak name =

Slovak names consist of a given name and surname. Slovakia uses the Western name order with the given name being listed before surname. However, there is a historical tradition to reverse this order, especially in official contexts including administrative papers and legal documents, as well as on gravestones and memorials.

Most Slovaks do not have a middle name. The family name forms for men and women are distinct in Slovakia, making it possible to identify gender from the name alone. As of 2003 there were 185,288 different family names in use among 5.4 million Slovaks, or one family name for every 29 citizens. There is an estimated 90,000 lineages in Slovakia. With marriage, the bride typically adopts the bridegroom's surname. Slovak names are very similar to Czech names.

== Given names ==
Given names in Slovakia are called baptismal names (Slovak: krstné mená) despite being completely different from the Christian baptismal names. Proper baptismal names given during infant baptism are still common in the countryside, yet they are only seldom used within the official name (if they are, they form the person's middle name). Generally, names in Slovakia can be of several distinct origins:

- Slavic names of pre-Christian origin (e.g. Dobromil)
- Christian names often inspired by saints (e.g. Vojtech)
- Names of past kings and rulers (e.g. Ladislav)
- Modern names (e.g. Lukas)
- Names of ethnic minorities living in Slovakia (e.g. Béla)

Most common given names in Slovakia (as of 2010)
Male names	Total people	Female names	Total people
Jozef	175,593	Mária	225,471
Ján	174,949	Anna	161,812
Peter	158,593	Zuzana	88,276
Martin	87,283	Katarína	88,001
Štefan	80,647	Eva	85,952
Milan	78,781	Jana	85,518
Michal	78,548	Helena	66,898
Miroslav	78,093	Monika	48,667
Tomáš	59,653	Marta	47,586
Ladislav	58,927	Martina	44,738

== Surnames ==
Surnames differ according to gender. Normally, the feminine form is created by adding suffix "ová" to the masculine form (e.g. Bača would be Bačová). If the surname is derived from adjectives, the ý suffix is replaced with á. Because Slovakia also has people with Hungarian, German, and other ancestors, some surnames in Slovakia will follow the convention of those languages and not conform to these norms.

Some popular surnames include:

- Derived from profession:
  - Kováč – Smith
  - Mlynár – Miller
  - Bača – shepherd
  - Rybár – fisher
  - Kráľ – king
  - Pekár – baker
  - Kuchár – cook
  - Mäsiar – butcher
  - Holič – barber
  - Maliar – painter
  - Kľúčiar – key maker
  - Mečiar – sword maker
  - Sklenár – glassmaker.
- Derived from adjectives:
  - Čierny – black
  - Biely – white
  - Suchý – dry
  - Mokrý – wet
  - Slaný – salty
  - Smutný – sad
  - Šťastný – happy/lucky
  - Malý – small
  - Široký – wide
  - Tichý – quiet
  - Surový – raw
- Others:
  - Koreň – root
  - Chren – horseradish
  - Repa – beet
  - Slanina – bacon
  - Polievka – soup
  - Cibuľka – little onion
  - Malina – raspberry
  - Dobrovodský – good water
  - Holub – pigeon
  - Chrobák – beetle
  - Komár – mosquito
  - Medvedík – little bear
  - Koleno – knee
  - Mráz – frost
  - Okienka – little window
  - Otčenáš – our father
  - Bezdeda – without a grandpa
  - Dolina – valley
  - Kocur – tomcat

== See also ==
- Slavic surnames
- Name days in Slovakia
- Czech name
- Slovak identity card
