= Suchý (surname) =

Suchý (Czech pronunciation: [ˈsuxiː]; feminine: Suchá) is a Czech and Slovak surname meaning "dry". Notable persons with that name include:

- Chuck Suchy, American musician and farmer
- Dominik Suchý (born 1987), Czech bobsledder
- Filip Suchý (born 1997), Czech ice hockey player
- Gregoria Karides Suchy (1923–2018), American composer and educator
- Jan Suchý (1944–2021), Czech ice hockey player
- Jaroslav Suchý (born 1971), Czech figure skater
- Jessica Suchy-Pilalis (born 1954), American musician
- Jiří Suchý (born 1931), Czech actor
- Jiří Suchý (ice hockey) (born 1988), Czech ice hockey player
- Marek Suchý (born 1988), Czech football player
- Martina Suchá (born 1980), Slovak tennis player
- Radoslav Suchý (born 1976), Slovak ice hockey player
- Růžena Suchá (1907–1989), Czech chess player

== See also ==
- Suchý, Czech village
- Suchy, Swiss municipality
- Suchy Las (disambiguation)
