= Slovak passport =

Passports issued to citizens and nationals of the Slovak Republic

Slovak passport; Slovenský pas
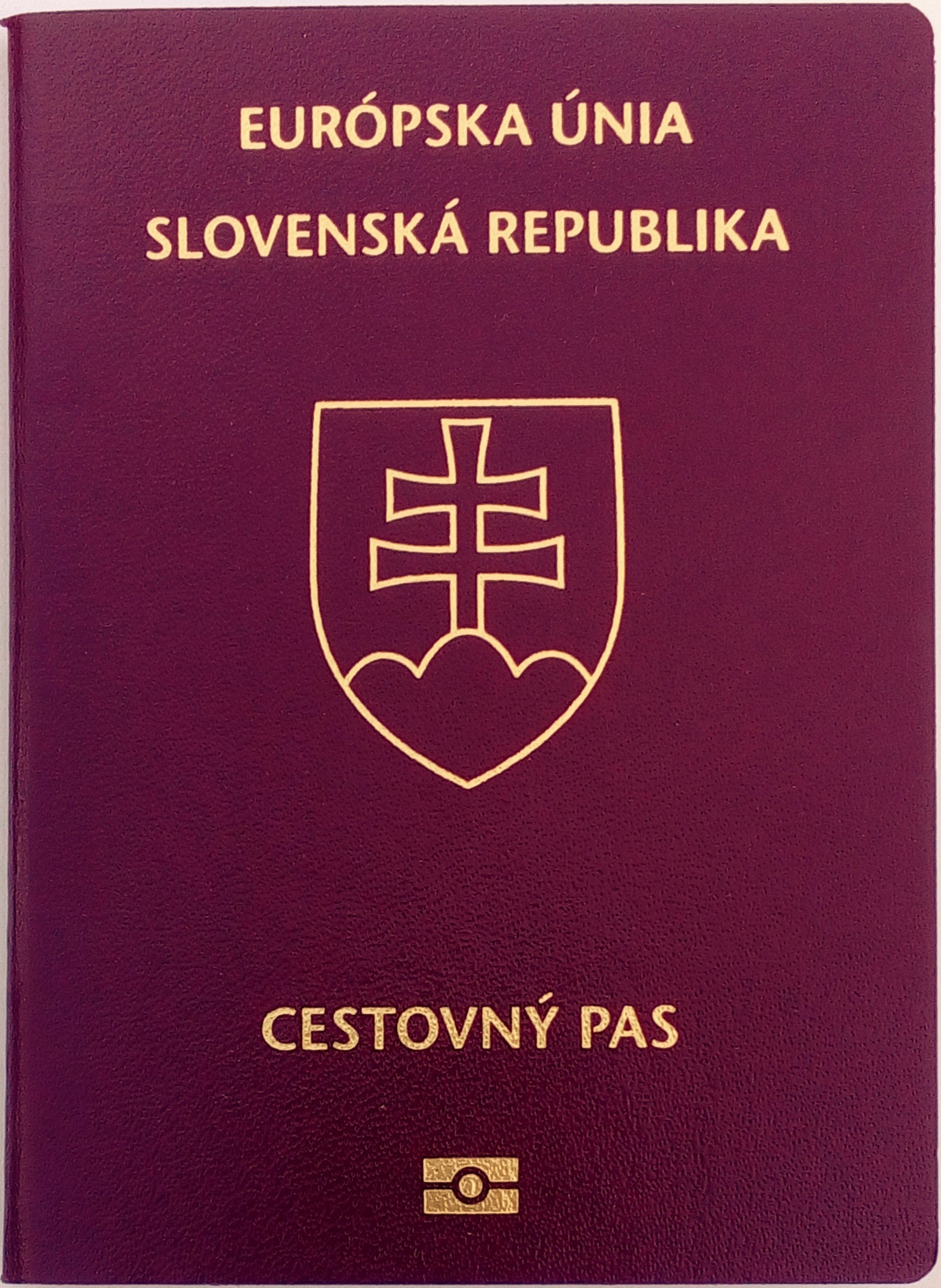
- The front cover of a contemporary Slovak biometric passport.
- Type: Passport
- Issued by: Slovakia
- First issued: 1 April 1993; 15 January 2008 (biometric passport booklet); 26 November 2014 (current version)
- Purpose: Identification
- Eligibility: Slovak citizenship
- Cost: €50/€100/€150 (age 16 and over, 30/10/2 days) €20/€40/€60 (age 6 - 16, 30/10/2 days) €12/€24/€36 (age 6 and under, 30/10/2 days)

The Slovak passport (Slovak: Slovenský pas) is issued to citizens of Slovakia to enable legal international travel. Every Slovak citizen is also a citizen of the European Union. The passport, along with the national identity card allows for free rights of movement and residence in any of the states of the European Economic Area and Schengen Area.

Every Slovak citizen is entitled to possess two passports of the same kind, if so desired. The second passport is valid for 5 years (instead of the standard 10 years), while the fee remains the same. Passports in Slovakia are issued by the police.

== History ==
Slovakia started issuing the current biometric passports on 15 January 2008. The biometric data consisted of the face picture. On 22 June 2009 the passports were changed to include second biometric data of the fingerprints. Because of the nature of biometric data acquirement, passports are now issued only directly to the passport owners.

=== Controversy ===
After a new design for Slovak passports was revealed in 2024, it was discovered that the ornamental design featured in the documents was created by a Polish artist, Agnieszka Murphy, rather than a Slovak designer, which sparked a controversy.

The pattern, which Slovak officials presented as a symbol of national pride was taken from a stock image library of Murphy’s work. Agnieszka Murphy sells her designs through image banks and doesn't receive information about buyers. As such she was completely unaware that her artwork had been used in the creation of Slovak passport. While Murphy stated that she is pleased her design was used, she also hoped that the Slovak Interior Ministry had purchased the appropriate license for her design.

Experts and groups like "Slovenský folklór bez fejku" (Slovak Folklore Without Fakes) criticized the design, stating that it was not an authentic Slovak pattern ("čičmiansky vzor"), but rather an imitation. This group posted pictures of buildings with authentic Slovak patterns to show the difference.

The discovery caused a backlash, which was also reported by Slovak television channel TA3.

== Visa requirements ==
As of April 2025, Slovak citizens had visa-free or visa on arrival access to 183 countries and territories, ranking the Slovak passport 9th in terms of travel freedom.

Visa requirements for Slovak citizens Slovakia Freedom of movement Visa free Visa issued upon arrival eVisa Visa available both on arrival or online Visa required prior to arrival

== Gallery of historic images ==
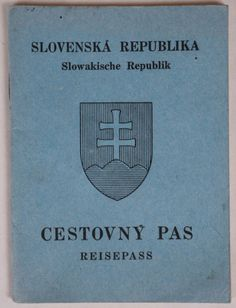
Slovak passport issued between 1939 and 1945, by the First Slovak Republic

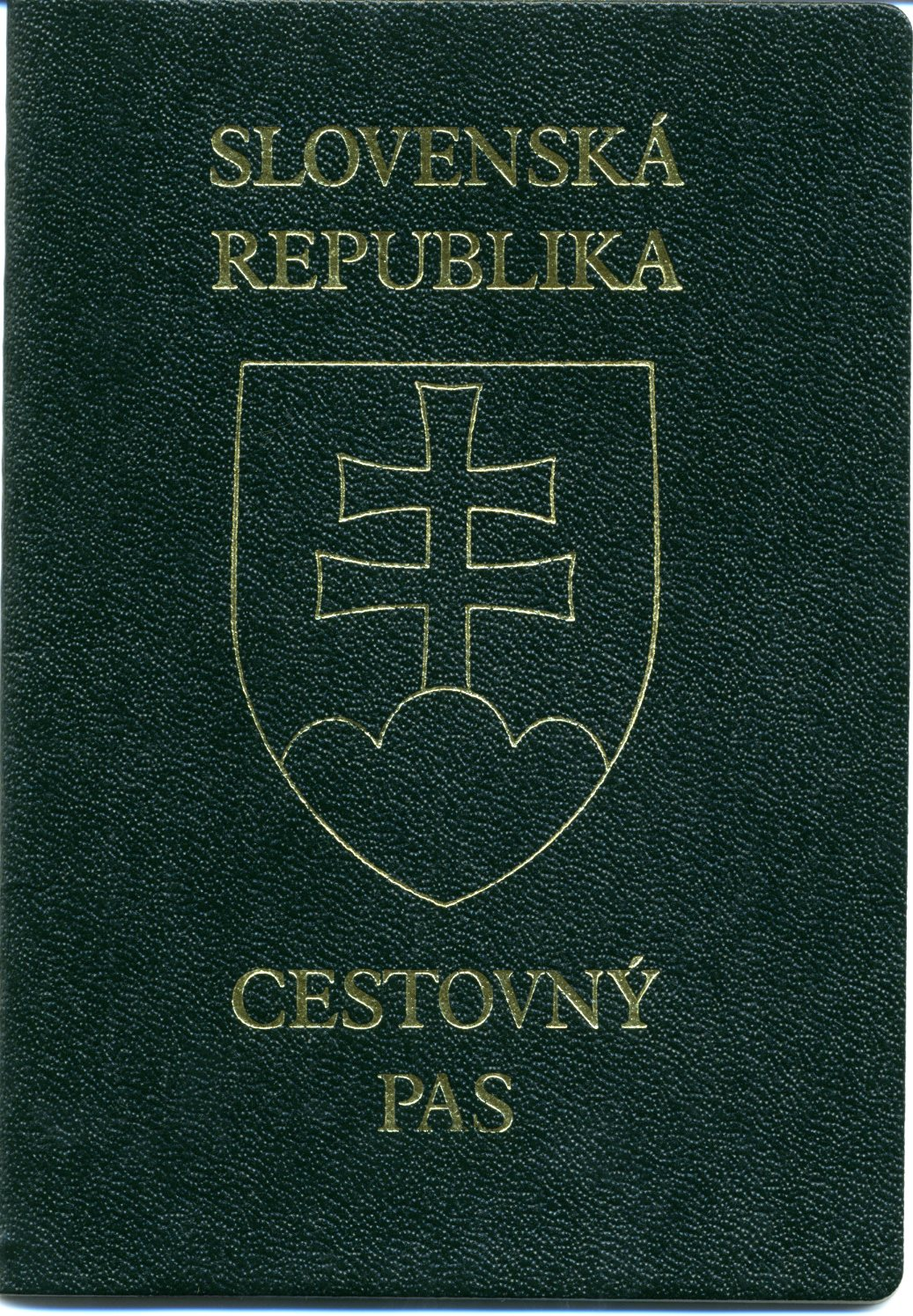
The non-biometric version issued between 1994 and 2005. The photo was glued onto the data page, which was then laminated

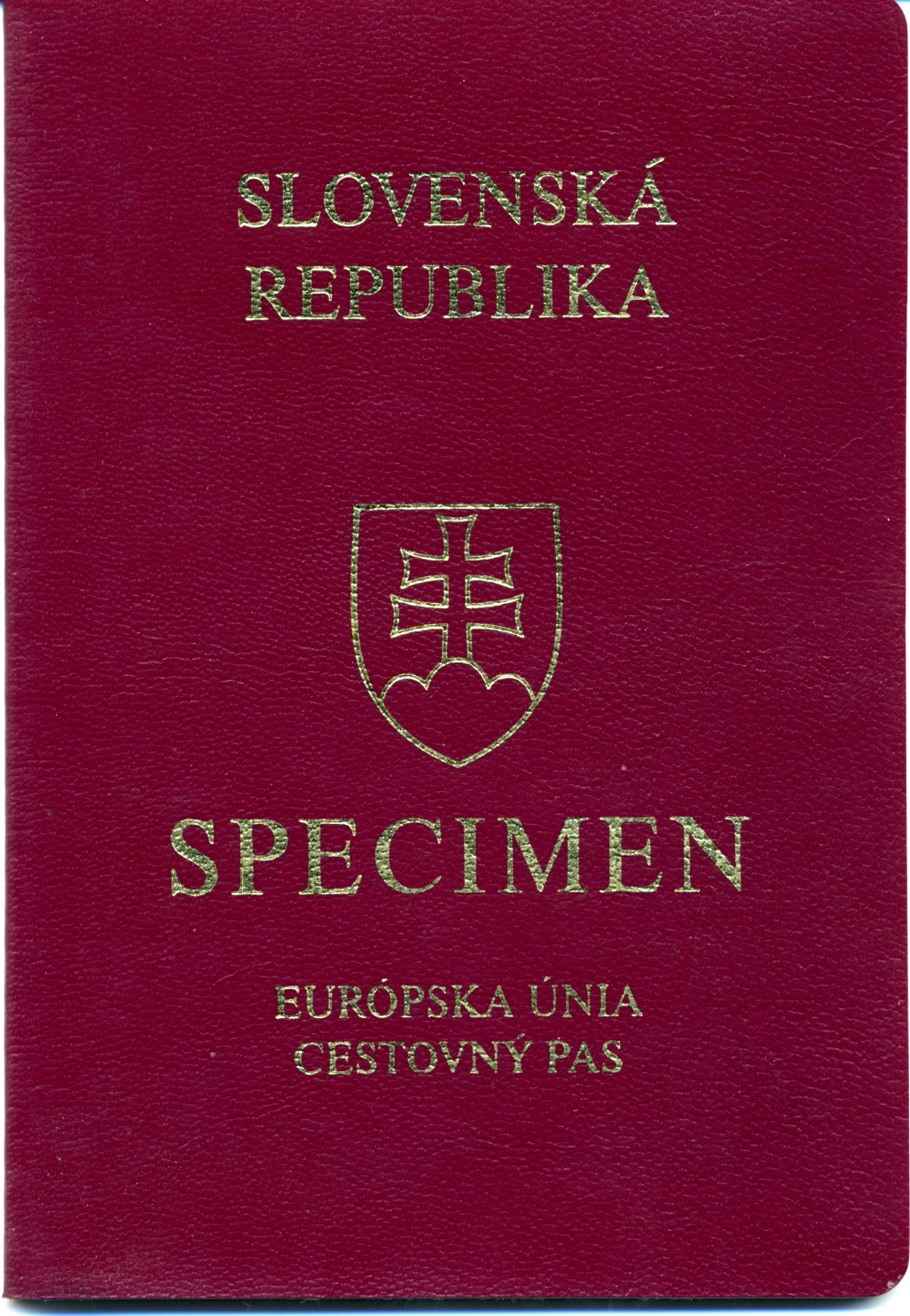
The non-biometric version issued between 2005 and 2008. The photo was imprinted directly onto the data page. Note that this is a specimen

== See also ==
- Visa requirements for Slovak citizens
- Passports of the European Union
