= Donald George =

American operatic tenor

Donald George is an American operatic tenor. He is a Professor of Voice at State University of New York, Potsdam's Crane School of Music. He has performed in major opera houses and concert halls of Europe.

== Biography ==
George was born in Pittsburg, California, and he grew up in Franklinton, Louisiana, near New Orleans. With voice scholarships, he obtained a bachelor's degree from Southeastern Louisiana University in Hammond, Louisiana, while studying with Ralph Roberts and a master's degree from Louisiana State University, where he studied with Paul Knowles. In Europe, he also studied with Margarethe von Winterfeldt the teacher of German tenor Fritz Wunderlich. He also worked with Kammersänger Josef Metternich and also with John Lester.

George made his debut in Munich at the Staatstheater am Gärtnerplatz as Belmonte in Mozart's Die Entführung aus dem Serail and at the Komische Oper Berlin as Tamino in Mozart's The Magic Flute in the production by Harry Kupfer, as Candide in a production of John Dew under the baton of James Allen Gähres at the Deutsche Oper Berlin and Alfredo in La traviata at the Staatsoper Unter den Linden Berlin. He sang at several Italian houses including La Scala, Teatro San Carlo in Naples and the Teatro Regio in Turin; France (Opéra Bastille, Théâtre du Châtelet, Théâtre du Capitole, Toulouse); and in the Netherlands at the De Nederlandse Opera, Opera Enschede, De Nationale Reisopera, Maastricht, and the Opera Zuid. In Austria he performed at the Salzburg Festival, Bregenz Festival, Vienna State Opera, Volksoper, and Theater an der Wien. In Spain he sang at the Teatro Real, Auditorio Nacional de Música, and Gran Teatre del Liceu in Barcelona; in Israel at the New Israel Opera; and in Argentina at the Teatro Colón. George has also sung with orchestras such as the Berlin Philharmonic, Vienna Philharmonic, l'Orchestra Sinfonica Nazionale della Rai, Italy, Radio France, Bilbao Orkestra Sinfonikoa, Czech Philharmonic, and London Symphony Orchestra with Zubin Mehta, Kurt Masur, Leonard Bernstein, Vladimir Jurowski, Christoph von Dohnányi, Sir Colin Davis, Lord Yehudi Menuhin and others.

In addition to Mozart roles, and such roles as Candide, the Prince in The Love for Three Oranges, Rodolfo in La bohème and the Duke in Rigoletto, George has sung as the tenor soloist in Bach's Passions and Cantatas with Helmuth Rilling, and in oratorio—Elijah, St. Paul and Carmina Burana. His voice has been credited with being a "pleasing tenor sound, inflected with an admirable musical sensitivity" and his portrayal in Love For Three Oranges as "…a wonderfully funny and sad prince" "Donald George suffers equally heartbreaking as the melancholy prince as he does as the prince in love...and an ideal casting. Opera International, said in a review of the premier recording of Rossini’s Aureliano in Palmira "Donald George qui confère à Aureliano une autorité..., et une virtuosité".

As an academic, George has formed with Lucy Mauro the ensemble DuoDrama and performed, given master classes and workshops, and published extensively. Articles written by George and Mauro include those appearing in American Music Teacher (on the nineteenth-century German Melodram), for Die Tonkunst (“The Historical Melodram”) and a review of the book Practicing: A Musicians Return to Music by Glenn Kurtz for American Music Teacher.. He is the author (with co-author Lucy Mauro) of the Oxford University Press book "Master Singers: Advice from the Stage" which interviews famous opera stars of today such as: Joyce DiDonato, Jonas Kaufmann, Thomas Hampson, Stephanie Blythe, Joseph Calleja, Christine Goerke and others.

Donald George’s honors include being made a colonel by Governor Buddy Roemer in 1990 for his service to Louisiana. He is an honorary citizen of Varna, Bulgaria and Bath, England and was appointed as an Honoured Professor at the Shenyang Conservatory of Music in Shenyang, China in 2007. He was also inducted into the Southeastern Louisiana University Hall of Fame in 2001 and received the key to his hometown in 2000. He has also been named the 2010 Alumnus of the Year by Southeastern Louisiana University. and received the SUNY Potsdam's President’s Award for Creativity and the Award from the Center for Student Research for Mentoring in 2014.

He resides in Germany on Lake Starnberg outside of Munich and in the US.

== Recordings ==
- Lang, Margaret Ruthven: Love is Everywhere: Songs Volume I, Donald George, tenor; Lucy Mauro, piano, Delos International
- Lang, Margaret Ruthven: New Love Must Rise: Songs Volume II, Donald George, tenor; Lucy Mauro, piano, Delos International
- Kralik Mathilde von: Komm Mit Mir-Come With Me: Songs, Donald George, tenor; Lucy Mauro, piano, Delos International
- Weigl, Joseph: Songs and Arias: Lieder und Arien, Donald George, tenor; Lucy Mauro, piano, Delos International
- Beethoven: Symphony No. 9 – BRTN Philharmonic Orchestra Brussels, Cantores Oratorio Choir Bruges, Gauci, Van Deyck, George Rosca, Alexander Rahbari (conductor). Label: Discover International DICD 920151
- Benoit, Peter: Hoogmis (High Mass) – BRTN Philharmonic Orchestra and Choir Brussels, Koniklijke Chorale Caecilia - Dubois, Donald George (tenor), Alexander Rahbari (conductor). Label: Discover International CICD 920178
- Laporte, André: Das Schloß- BRTN Philharmonic Orchestra Brussels

George, Waag, Rosca, Lootens, Rawlins, Alexander Rahbari, (conductor. Label: Koch Discover International DICD 920375-6

- Mach, Konstantin: ''Maria Himmelfahrt'', Op. 21 -Chor und Orchester des Philharmonischen Orchesters Regensburg, Baumann, Kessler, Donald George, Hillebrand, Eberhard Kraus, (conductor) Co-Production Bavarian Radio and Calig-Verlag Munich
- Mendelssohn: Elias(Elijah)-Israel Philharmonic Orchestra.MDR Choir Leipzig, Kurt Masur, conductor

Miles, Donath, van Ness, Donald George, Teldec Classics International 9031-73131-2

- Mozart: La Finita Giardiniera, Festival Radio France Montpellier, Friedemann Leyer, conductor, Donald George, Moser, McCarthy, Piland
- Orff: Carmina Burana, MDR Symphony Orchestra Leipzig, Daniel Nazareth, conductor, Donald George, Mohr, Korondi

(also in video with drefa Atelier GmbH)

- Puccini: Manon Lescaut, BRT Philharmonic Orchestra Brussels, Alexander Rahbari, conductor, Gauci, Kaludov, Sardiniero, Rosca, Donald George Naxos 8-660019
- Rossini: Aureliano In Palmira, I Virtuosi di Praga, Francesco Corti, conductor, Donald George, Manzotti, Korovine, Canis, Bongiovanni Records Bologna
- Rossini: Le Nozze Di Teti E Di Peleo (first recording)Czech Chamber Choir, I Virtuosi di Praga, Marc Andrea, conductor, Donald George, Korovina, Lopera, Malta, Schaefer, Hänssler Classic Collector CD-No. 91.111
- Saint-Saëns: Samson & Dalila, Munich Radio Orchestra, Sir Colin Davis, conductor, Baltsa, Carreras, Malmberg, George, Phillips Classics
- Schubert: Die Schöne MüllerinDonald George, tenor, Jan Vermeulen, pianoforte (Hamerflügel), Phaedra Classics 292 002
- Strauss Salome, Berliner Philharmoniker, Zubin Mehta, conductor, Marton, Zednik, Weikl, Fassbaender, Lewis, O'Neal, Maus, Donald George, Beyer, von Halem, Sony Classics s2K 46717
- Verdi: Alzira Munich Radio Orchestra, Lamberto Gardelli, conductor, Rotering, Bruson, Cotrubas, Araiza,

Bonilla, Donald George, Lis, Orfeo S 057832 H

- Verdi: Requiem, Slovak Radio New Philharmonic Orchestra & Slovak Philharonic Choir, Alexander Rahbari, conductor, Gauci, Alperyn, Donald George, Mikulas, Discover International DICD 920105-6
- Weill, Kurt: Seven Deadly Sins, Cleveland Orchestra, Christoph von Dohnanyi, conductor, Silja, Donald George, Vogel, Gottschick, Kapellmann, Cleveland Orchestra 75th Anniversary CD Edition
