= Art Museum at SUNY Potsdam =

- Location: State University of New York at Potsdam; Potsdam, New York
- Coordinates: 44.6651°N 74.970133°W
- Type: Art museum
- Website: www.potsdam.edu/museum

The Art Museum at SUNY Potsdam is part of the State University of New York at Potsdam, located in the village of Potsdam in St. Lawrence County, New York.

The permanent collection of the Art Museum at SUNY Potsdam consists of around 1,900 objects that range from post-war American and European art, contemporary art, ethnographic art, and early American and European art. The Japanese collection features a large number of Gutai group pieces that present a detailed outlook on Japanese abstract painting from the late 1950s to the early 1970s. The Italian collection contains a mix of mid-20th century painting, sculpture, and works on paper done by Italian artists from the postwar period, including works by Afro Basaldella, Giuseppe Capogrossi, Zuran Antoni Music, Arnoldo Pomodoro, Gio Pomodoro, Paolo Scheggi and Giulio Turcato.

== Exhibition Spaces ==
=== Gibson Gallery ===
The Gibson Gallery is located in Brainard Hall and is named after the late Dr. Roland Gibson after his donations of contemporary and modern works of art to the Potsdam Art Museum Collection. The space is divided into three sectors and hosts eight to ten exhibitions per year that range from international and regional professional artists to SUNY Potsdam Art students.

=== Hosmer Hall Gallery ===
The Gallery is housed within the Crane School of Music. The Gallery exhibits artworks from the museum's permanent collection along with work from professional artists.

=== Dunn Hall Display ===
Located in the lobby of Dunn Theater, this space shows a number of smaller works. Exhibitions in this space change by semester and include professional artists as well as SUNY Potsdam student work.

=== Art around Campus ===
Large works of art can be seen in collection hung in public spaces around campus. Most notable areas include Flagg Hall, Kellas Hall and Crumb Library, where work is displayed in high traffic walkways. Outdoor sculptures can also be spotted around campus located around the academic building.

=== Storage ===
The museum also includes a Print/Drawing Study and Storage room along with a Painting/Sculpture Study and Storage room. These spaces can service the studio classes and allow students the experience of hands on research in preservation and restoration of various works.
