= Alfred Music =

American music publishing company

- Founded: 1922; 104 years ago
- Founder: Sam Manus
- Country of origin: United States
- Headquarters location: Van Nuys, Los Angeles, California
- Key people: Steven Manus, Gear Fisher, Morton Manus, Iris Manus, Ron Manus,
- Official website: www.alfred.com

Alfred Music is an American music publishing company. Founded in New York in 1922, it is headquartered in Van Nuys, California, with additional branches in Miami, New York, Germany, Singapore, and the United Kingdom.

== History ==
In New York City’s Tin Pan Alley in 1922, Sam Manus, a violinist and importer of mood music for silent films, started a music publishing company and named it Manus Music. The company published primarily popular sheet music. In 1930, Sam acquired the music publisher, Alfred & Company, founded by Alfred Haase. Sam decided to combine the names and shortened it to Alfred Music, which the company is still known as today. Sam's son, Morty (né Morton Manus; 1926–2016), clarinetist and pianist, began working for Alfred Music in the late 1940s and met his wife Iris at the company when the bookkeeper, Rose Kopelman, brought her daughter to work one day. Inspired by the need for quality music educational products. Morty, a clarinetist and pianist, oversaw the development of an instructional series for accordion, followed by books for guitar, piano, and recorder. In 1975, the firm moved to larger offices in Los Angeles. In 1980, with growing sales, the company went international.

In 2002, the company partnered with Daisy Rock Girl Guitars, and in 2005 it acquired Warner Bros. Publications (including the Warner Bros. subsidiary company Belwin-Mills) from Warner Music Group. Warner Bros. Publications was the successor to companies such as Feist, Harms, Miller, Mills, Remick, and Witmark.

In April 2016, Alfred Music joined Peaksware Holdings LLC, parent company of MakeMusic. Gear Fisher became CEO, and Ron Manus moved from CEO to Business Development Manager. At this time, Alfred sold its sacred music catalog to Jubilate Music.

== Product offerings ==
Alfred's portfolio of music teaching products include:

- Sound Innovations
  - SI Online: Access streaming video MasterClasses and audio accompaniments for SI Strings and SI Band Books 1 & 2, and Sound Percussion.
  - Sound Innovations for String Orchestra: emphasizes playing with a characteristic sound.
  - Ensemble Development for Concert Band: provides exercises to help students develop concepts needed to build the foundational qualities of concert band performance.
  - Sound Percussion: four books plus a Teacher's Score for snare drum / bass drum, mallet percussion, timpani, and accessory instruments.
- Accent on Achievement course: a 3-book band-music course written by John O'Reilly and Mark Williams.
- Premier Piano course: includes a lesson book, theory books, performance books, technique books, and supplementary books.
- Behind the Player: a series of DVDs consisting of conversations with, and song instruction from, hard rock guitarists.
