= Robert McElheran =

Bishop in Canada

The Ven Robert Benjamin McElheran, DD (1 February 1877 – 12 August 1939) was Archdeacon of Winnipeg from 1920 to 1930 and later the president of Wycliffe College in Toronto.

== Early life and education ==
McElheran was born in London, Ontario, where his father was a newspaper editor. He was educated at Wycliffe College, Toronto; and ordained in 1906 in Winnipeg.

== Career ==
McElerhan left high school to work for the Farmers' Advocate newspaper, and was transferred to the paper's Winnipeg office. In 1898 h.e joined the newly formed Anglican parish of St. Matthews, serving a lay reader. IN 1900 he returned to London to work as a lay assistant at Cronyn Memorial Church.

After receiving his education at Wycliffe College, McElheran returned to Winnipeg, where he served at St Matthew Church, first as curate in 1906 then as rector until 1920. He was given an honorary Doctor of Devinity degree by St. John's College in 1925 and by Wycliffe college in 1927.

He was Archdeacon of Winnipeg until 1930, when he moved with his family to Toronto to become principal of Wycliffe College, Toronto. McElheran led the college through the Great Depression, during a time when it faced financial difficulties.

He died in Toronto in 1939. His wife Irene later wrote a book about his life and career.

== Personal ==
McElheran is the father of choral conductor Brock McElheran.
