= John O'Reilly (composer) =

American composer (born 1940)

John O'Reilly (born November 25, 1940) is an American composer and music author. He has received numerous ASCAP awards and studied composition with Robert Washburn, Arthur Frackenpohl, Charles Walton and Donald Hunsberger. He graduated from the Crane School of Music at the State University of New York at Potsdam. In addition, he is the recipient of a Master of Arts in Composition and Theory degree from Columbia University and an honorary Doctorate of Music from Crane. He taught instrumental music and theory at all grade levels and for 35 years was Editor-In-Chief and Executive Vice President for Alfred Publishing Company. He is co-author of Yamaha Band Student with Sandy Feldstein, Strictly Strings with Jacqueline Dillon and James Kjelland, and Accent on Achievement with Mark Williams. He has made a major impact on concert band, and string music education. He has received 50 prestigious commissions for his music, published 407 compositions and has conducted his music in 48 states, all Canadian provinces and numerous international venues.

== Books ==
- Solos for the Percussion Player
