= Jessica Suchy-Pilalis =

American classical composer (born 1954)

Jessica Ray Suchy-Pilalis (born 1954) is an American harpist. She is specialist in the theory and practice of Byzantine chant.

== Life and career ==
Jessica Suchy-Pilalis was born and grew up in Milwaukee. She became interested in playing the harp when she was in kindergarten. She graduated from Shorewood High School in 1972. Suchy-Pilalis went on to become an honor student at the University of Wisconsin–Milwaukee (UWM). Her mother, Gregoria Karides Suchy, who taught at UWM, was also a composer who has written harp music for her daughter.

She received two grants to study Byzantine music and to perform in Greece between 1984 and 1985. During that year, she became a psalti, or cantor, at the Indianapolis Holy Trinity Greek Orthodox Church. She studied Byzantine music at Holy Cross Greek Orthodox Theological Seminary with Savas I. Savas and in Greece where she studied primarily with Dimitrios Sourlantzis. In 1988, she received a fellowship from the Indiana Arts Commission and National Endowment for the Arts. She received diplomas with honors in Byzantine Music from two conservatories in Thessaloniki, Greece, and is recognized/certified as an Hieropsalti (Chanter) by both the Greek Orthodox Church and State.

In 1996 she took a teaching position with the Crane School of Music at State University of New York at Potsdam. She also established a concert career, performing both in the US and abroad. She has toured in Greece as a solo harpist under the auspices of the U.S. Department of State, and performed at international music festivals and for Greek National Radio-Television. In 2011, Suchy-Pilalis began a project with the Crane Harp Ensemble to encourage the creation and performance of new harp music for the twenty-first century.

=== Research ===
Her research involves modal analysis of Byzantine chant and, using the results of the analyses, she sets English translations of hymns as a Byzantine melodist. In 2006, she was awarded the Medallion of St. Romanos the Melodist by the National Federation of Greek Orthodox Church Musicians. Selected hymns have been recorded by Archangel Voices (Vladimir Morosan, director) and the Boston Byzantine Choir (Charles Marge, director). Presently, she chants at St. Olympia Orthodox Church, Potsdam, New York, and Holy Trinity Greek Orthodox Cathedral, Camp Hill, Pennsylvania.

Suchy-Pilalis' research in harp includes historical harps. She is a specialist on the life and compositions of Madame Delaval and has restored a single-action Érard harp specifically for performances of Madame Delaval's compositions. She has served as vice-president of the Historical Harp Society and as a member of the board, and has been a member of the editorial board of the American Harp Journal.

== Works ==
Selected works include:

- Kanon of St. Kosmas for the Nativity of Christ (Orthodox Music Press, 2011)
- Hymns for Pascha
- Divine Liturgy in the Varys Mode in Greek and English
- Guide to the Byzantine Modes: The Mnemonic Verses (two versions)
- Troparion of the Forefeast of the Cross and numerous other troparia for feasts and saints
- The Order of Service for the Lesser Sanctification of Water
- Prayer of Thanksgiving (paraliturgical)

Suchy-Pilalis appears on a number of recordings as a harpist. She has also written articles including "The Mysterious Madame Delaval (Part I)", published in the American Harp Journal.
