= Gregoria Karides Suchy =

Gregoria Karides Suchy (November 14, 1923 – October 3, 2018) was an American composer and educator. Her music uses electroacoustic and Greek musical elements.

== Biography ==
Karides Suchy was the daughter of Greek immigrants and was born on November 14, 1923 in Milwaukee. Her family was musical and she started playing piano and the accordion as a child in the family's band.

In 1945, she graduated from the Milwaukee State Teachers College, later University of Wisconsin–Milwaukee, (UWM) and began teaching soon after. She taught at UWM for more than fifty years. In 2015, she earned the Distinguished Alumni Award from UWM.

Karides Suchy died on October 3, 2018. Her work was celebrated posthumously by the Crane School of Music on November 14, 2023. UWM offers a scholarship in her name for Music students.

== Work ==
Karides Suchy began to create electroacoustic music in the 1960s. Her compositions use the twelve-tone scale. She also incorporated non-traditional items, like beer bottles and spliced tape, in her compositions. Some of her work incorporates Greek folk music. She called her experimental compositions "soundscaping." According to the Crane School of Music, she may have been the first person in Wisconsin to experiment with electronic music. She has written harp music for her daughter, Jessica Suchy-Pilalis.

Karides Suchy's work has been performed both in the United States and internationally.
