= Stacey Fox =

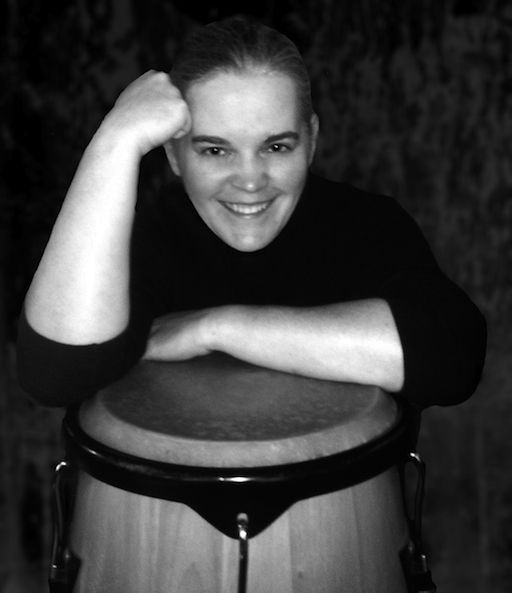

Background information
- Born: June 21, 1965 (age 61); Ithaca, New York
- Genres: independent music, indigenous music, instrumental, world music
- Occupation: Transdisciplinary artist
- Instruments: Percussion, piano, vocals
- Website: www.staceyfox.com

Stacey Fox (born June 21, 1965) is an American transdisciplinary artist, animator, percussionist, composer and filmmaker. Fox is a professor at Michigan State University under the College of Communication Arts and Sciences.

== Education ==
Fox graduated in 1983 from Saratoga Springs High School, Saratoga Springs, NY. Fox was a student of percussionist James Peterscak and conductor Timothy Topolevski at the Crane School of Music, State University of New York at Potsdam, where she received her Bachelor of Music in Music Education and Master of Music in Solo Performance - Percussion. Fox later attended post-graduate studies in Solo Performance at Arizona State University.

== Career ==
Fox's creative and educational works have been funded by institutions such as American Composers Forum, and NASA, alongside being presented in installations across numerous venues including the Tang Teaching Museum and Art Gallery.

She is currently Wizard-in-Residence in the School of Journalism at Michigan State University, a non-standard academic rank attributed to her multifaceted professorial position. Fox is also affiliated with Knight Center for Environmental Journalism. She has collaborated as Senior Educational Design Technology Adviser and Lead Artist on projects for the Smithsonian Institution and represented the United States as an Artist Ambassador performing and teaching in various countries through the invitation of the U.S Department of States' Performing Arts Initiative Program.

== Discography ==
Entries without year listed have unidentified release dates

Year	Title	Notes
2003	Chuang Tzu's Pow-Wow Drum	Soundtrack for multi-media work of the same name
2006	Maria's Pond	
2020	Songs of Mars	
2023	Unmetered	
	Echoes of Flight	
	Drumming	
	Alternative Scores	
	Drums	

== Filmography ==
This list is incomplete

- Chuang Tzu’s Pow-Wow Drum — film
- Children of the Wakarusa — film
- Balls — film component
- New Dawn Native Dancers — film
- Hidden Pools — multimedia work
- Cultivating Stillness — film
