= Mlynář =

Mlynář (feminine: Mlynářová) is a Czech surname derived from the Czech word for "miller", mlynář. The Slovak form is Mlynár (feminine: Mlynárová).

Mlynář, Mlynár or Mlynar may refer to:

- Peter Mlynár (born 1988), Slovak skier
- Vladimír Mlynář (born 1966), former journalist, politician and statesman
- Zdeněk Mlynář (1930–1997), Czech politician and politologist
- Zdeněk Mlynář (cyclist) (born 1976)

== See also ==
- Mynář
