= Maria Hepel =

American chemist and academic

Maria Hepel is an American chemist and SUNY Distinguished Professor at the State University of New York at Potsdam (SUNY Potsdam), where she served as a chair of the Department of Chemistry (2007–2015). She is known for her interdisciplinary research in nanoscience, electrochemistry, and environmental technologies. She received American Chemical Society Award for Research in 2017.

== Early life and education ==
Hepel earned a Master of Science (1969) and a PhD in Chemistry (1976) from Jagiellonian University in Kraków, Poland, where she was hired as an Assistant Professor of Chemistry in 1976. She also completed postdoctoral training in chemistry at the State University of New York at Buffalo (1982) and in physics at Brooklyn College of the City University of New York (1985).

== Career ==
Hepel's academic career continued at State University of New York at Potsdam, where she was hired as an Associate Professor in 1985, and Professor of Chemistry in 1991. From 2007 to 2015, she served as the Chair of the Chemistry Department.

In addition to her tenure at SUNY Potsdam, Hepel held adjunct positions, including an Adjunct Full Professor at SUNY Buffalo's Chemistry Department from 2002 to 2012. She was also an Adjunct Associate Professor at SUNY Buffalo from 1989 to 2002, and an Adjunct Assistant Professor at Brooklyn College of the City University of New York (CUNY) from 1984 to 1985, where she also held a Senior Research Associate position in the Physics Department.

Hepel authored and co-authored 179 publications, including 4 edited books, 44 contributed book chapters, published by the American Chemical Society, Materials Science Society and the Electrochemical Society, and peer-reviewed articles published in international scientific journals.

She has secured over $1.3 million in grants, advancing SUNY Potsdam’s research programs. Hepel holds memberships in the American Chemical Society (1981 – present), the Electrochemical Society (1980–present), and the Materials Research Society (1998–present).

=== Research ===
Hepel’s research spans nanoscience, electrochemistry, and nanomedicine with applications in public health, environmental remediation, and energy technologies. Her work on nanowires and quantum conductance investigates electron transport in atomically thin structures, while her development of piezoelectric and electrochemical biosensors focuses on detecting biomarkers for diseases such as cancer and diabetes. Her research works on supercapacitors based on nanostructured materials resulted in the development of new energy technologies for electrochemical power sources. Hepel's interdisciplinary projects employ advanced instrumentation, such as atomic force microscopy (AFM), electrochemical quartz crystal nanogravimetry (EQCN), and Raman spectroscopy.

== Selected publications ==
- Hepel, Maria; Petrukhina, Marina A.; Samuilov, Vladimir (2023). "High Power-Density WO3-x–Grafted Corannulene-Modified graphene nanostructures for Micro-Supercapacitors". Journal of Electroanalytical Chemistry. 928 116990. doi:10.1016/j.jelechem.2022.116990.
- Grabowska, Iwona; Hepel, Maria; Kurzątkowska-Adaszyńska, Katarzyna (2021-12-27). "Advances in Design Strategies of Multiplex Electrochemical Aptasensors". Sensors. 22 (1): 161. Bibcode:2021Senso..22..161G. doi:10.3390/s22010161. ISSN 1424-8220. PMC 8749765. PMID 35009703.
- Hepel, Maria (2022-03-07). "Advances in micro-supercapacitors (MSCs) with high energy density and fast charge-discharge capabilities for flexible bioelectronic devices—A review". Electrochemical Science Advances. 3 (3) e2100222. doi:10.1002/elsa.202100222. ISSN 2698-5977.
- Stobiecka, Magdalena; Hepel, Maria (2011). "Double-shell gold nanoparticle-based DNA-carriers with poly-l-lysine binding surface". Biomaterials. 32 (12): 3312–3321. doi:10.1016/j.biomaterials.2010.12.064. ISSN 0142-9612. PMID 21306772.
- Hepel, Maria; Dela-Moss, Lumbini Indee; Redmond, Haley (2014). "Lattice polarization effects in electrochromic switching in WO3−x films studied by pulse-nanogravimetric technique". Journal of Solid State Electrochemistry. 18 (5): 1251–1260. doi:10.1007/s10008-013-2219-8. ISSN 1432-8488.
- Nowicka, Anna M.; Stojek, Zbigniew; Hepel, Maria (2013-01-31). "Chromium(VI) but Not Chromium(III) Species Decrease Mitoxantrone Affinity to DNA". The Journal of Physical Chemistry B. 117 (4): 1021–1030. doi:10.1021/jp3109094. ISSN 1520-6106. PMID 23293930.
- Hepel, Maria (2020-01-09). "Magnetic Nanoparticles for Nanomedicine". Magnetochemistry. 6 (1): 3. doi:10.3390/magnetochemistry6010003. ISSN 2312-7481.
- Hepel, Maria; Stobiecka, Magdalena (2018). "Supramolecular interactions of oxidative stress biomarker glutathione with fluorone black". Spectrochimica Acta Part A: Molecular and Biomolecular Spectroscopy. 192: 146–152. Bibcode:2018AcSpA.192..146H. doi:10.1016/j.saa.2017.11.017. PMID 29128748.
