= Lisa Vroman =

American lyric soprano and stage actress (born 1956)

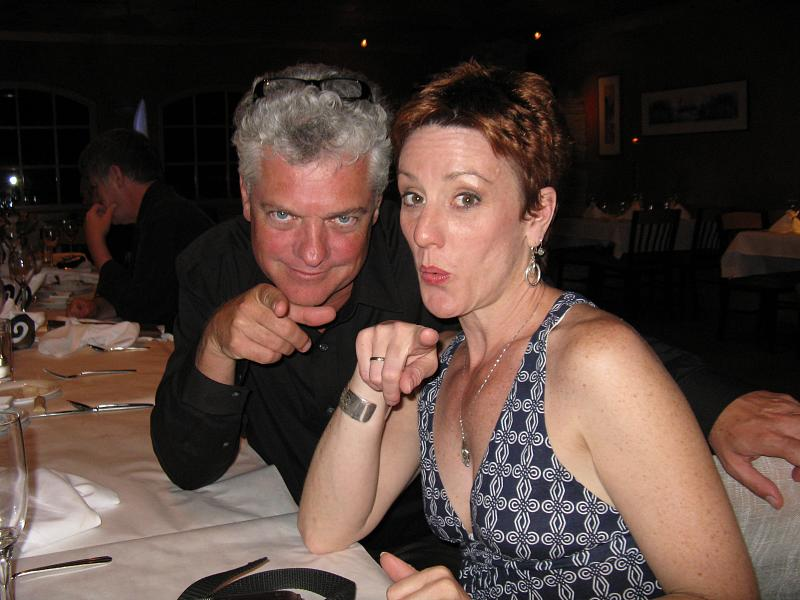
- Vroman with Michael Barrett
- Education: Crane School of Music at SUNY Potsdam; Carnegie Mellon University (MFA)
- Occupation: Stage actress
- Website: lisavroman.com

Lisa Vroman (born 1956) is an American lyric soprano and stage actress.

Vroman's mother and stepfather teach music, and her father was a singer. She graduated from the Crane School of Music at SUNY Potsdam in 1979. She earned a master of fine arts degree in opera and voice performance at Carnegie Mellon University. Vroman became a teacher before her interest in performing took precedence.

Vroman debuted on Broadway as Christine in The Phantom of the Opera (1988), a role she also played for five years in San Francisco, she again returned to Phantom in 2025 taking on the supporting role of Madame Giry for the United States tour. Her other Broadway work was in the Andrew Lloyd Webber musical Aspects of Love (1990). She also appeared in a concert version of Sweeney Todd in the role of Johanna in San Francisco.

Vroman is a frequent guest soloist with orchestras. She recently made her debut with the New York Festival of Song and the New York City Opera, in the latter starring as Rosabella in The Most Happy Fella. In the summer of 2006 she sang the role of Mabel in The Pirates of Penzance at Utah Opera. In the summer of 2008 she starred as Lili Vanessi/Kate in Glimmerglass Opera's production of Kiss Me, Kate.
