= Suchy Las (disambiguation) =

Suchy Las is a large village north of Poznań in west-central Poland.

Suchy Las (literally meaning "dry forest") may also refer to the following villages in Poland:

- Suchy Las, Koło County in Greater Poland Voivodeship (west-central Poland)
- Suchy Las, Masovian Voivodeship (east-central Poland)
- Suchy Las, West Pomeranian Voivodeship (north-west Poland)
