= Mynář =

Mynář (feminine: Mynářová) is a Czech surname. It is a dialectical form of the word mlynář, i.e. 'miller'. Notable people with the surname include:

- Radek Mynář (born 1974), Czech footballer
- Vratislav Mynář (born 1967), Czech businessman, civil servant and politician
- Vojtěch Mynář (1944–2018), Czech politician
