= Arthur Frackenpohl =

American composer (1924–2019)

Arthur Roland Frackenpohl (23 April 1924 – 8 June 2019) was an American composer and Professor Emeritus at the Crane School of Music at the State University of New York at Potsdam.

Frackenpohl was born in Irvington, New Jersey. He held degrees from the Eastman School of Music (BA, MA) and McGill University (DM). In 1942, he was initiated into the Alpha Zeta chapter of Theta Chi fraternity at the University of Rochester. He studied composition at Tanglewood in 1948 with Darius Milhaud and with Nadia Boulanger at Fontainebleau in 1950, where he was awarded the First Prize in Composition. In 1949, Frackenpohl joined the faculty of the Crane School of Music at the State University of New York at Potsdam. From 1961 until his retirement, he served there as Professor of Music and Coordinator of Keyboard Courses, receiving the SUNY Chancellor’s Award for Excellence in Teaching in 1982.

Frackenpohl has been awarded numerous grants and fellowships for composition over the years, including one from the Ford Foundation in 1959-60 to serve as composer-in-residence for the Hempstead (NY) Public Schools. He has published over 250 instrumental and choral compositions and arrangements, various recordings and one textbook, Harmonization at the Piano, which is used in several college-level keyboard classes in the United States.
