= Brock McElheran =

Canadian coductor (1918–2008)

Brock McElheran (6 January 1918 – 23 September 2008) was a Canadian conductor and professor at the Crane School of Music at SUNY Potsdam and a published author.

== Early life and education ==
McElheran was born in Winnipeg, Manitoba, the son of Robert and Irene McElherean. He moved with his family to Toronto in 1930 when his father became president of Wycliffe College, Toronto. He attended the University of Toronto, graduating with a Bachelor of Arts degree in 1939 and a Bachelor of Music degrees in 1947. He studied conducting at The Royal Conservatory of Music.

== Career ==
McElheran served in the navy during World War II as a meteorological officer. He then joined the faculty of the State of New York University at Potsdam.

In 1964, McElheran wrote the textbook Conducting Techniques for Beginners and Professionals, which is used today in several conducting classes around the world.

Besides conducting various ensembles at the Crane School of Music, McElheran was also a guest conductor for a number of ensembles, including the Philadelphia Orchestra.

For fourteen years, beginning in about 1970, McElheran directed the Saratoga-Potsdam Choral Institute, (SPCI), a three-week summer school held at Skidmore College in Saratoga Springs, New York. He was also conductor of The Elgar Choir in Montreal from 1972 until about 1980.

McElheran conducted the orchestra and chorus at the closing ceremonies of the 1980 Winter Olympics in Lake Placid. In July 1986, he conducted the Liberty Weekend Chorus on Governors Island in New York; the opening ceremony was televised on ABC.

In 1995, he published a book recalling his experiences in World War II, V-Bombs and Weathermaps. He also authored Music Reading by Intervals: A Modern Sight-Singing and Ear-Training Method for Singers, Conductors, and Teachers in 1998.

Brock had various compositions published too. During his active career he prepared choruses for many of the world's leading conductors, including Eugene Ormandy, Robert Shaw, and Zubin Mehta. He died in Potsdam, New York, in 2008.

Recently, Nelly Maude Case, a professor at Crane, wrote a biography on McElheran, Worry Early: The Life of Brock McElheran.
