= State University of New York at Potsdam =

Public college in Potsdam, New York, US

- Motto: "To Learn - To Search - To Serve"
- Type: Public college
- Established: 1816; 210 years ago
- Parent institution: State University of New York
- Endowment: $60.4 million (2025)
- President: Suzanne Smith
- Students: 2,519 (fall 2025)
- Undergraduates: 1,750 (fall 2025)
- Postgraduates: 769 (fall 2025)
- Location: Potsdam, New York, U.S. 44°39′45″N 74°58′27″W
- Campus: Rural, 240 acres (97 ha) maintained
- Colors: Maroon & Gray
- Nickname: Bears
- Sporting affiliations: NCAA Division III – SUNYAC
- Mascot: Max C. Bear
- Website: potsdam.edu

The State University of New York at Potsdam (SUNY Potsdam or simply Potsdam) is a public college in Potsdam, New York, United States. Founded in 1816, it is the northernmost member of the State University of New York (SUNY) system. It is composed of the College of Arts & Sciences, the School of Education and Professional Studies, and the Crane School of Music.

== History ==
=== 1800s ===
Potsdam was founded by Benjamin Raymond in 1816 as the "St. Lawrence Academy". In 1834, the academy was chosen by the New York State Legislature to exclusively offer a teacher education program for its senatorial district. With funds from the state, and from support by preceptor Reverend Asa Brainerd, the first diploma in teaching was given in 1836, thus beginning the academy's and eventually the college's longstanding tradition of excellence in the field of teacher education.

In 1866, the State Legislature ended its funding of teacher education departments in private academies, and began establishing several normal schools throughout the state. The Village of Potsdam was thus named as one of four locations for new normal schools, and in 1867, the St. Lawrence Academy became the Potsdam Normal School.

By 1886, the Potsdam Normal School had become the first institution in the United States to offer a normal training course for public school music teachers in the United States. Founded by Julia E. Crane, the "Crane Normal Institute of Music" continues today as the world-renowned Crane School of Music as a leader in the field of music education.

=== 1900s ===
The State University of New York was founded in 1948, and Potsdam became one of its founding members, and was thus renamed New York State Teachers College at Potsdam. In 1964, the college's mission changed to providing multiple programs, and the university adopted its current name.

During the 1980s, despite the college's traditional strengths in music and education, the college gained recognition for its quickly blossoming mathematics program under the guidance of Clarence F. Stephens. Known as the Potsdam Miracle, Stephens transformed a practically non-existent department to having the third largest number of mathematics majors of any institution in the United States during his tenure.

=== 2010 enrollment peak ===
In 2010, the college had a total enrollment of approximately 4,500 students, with approximately 930 freshmen entering, the largest first-year class since 1982.

Since that time, enrollment has declined by 43%, and the student body now hovers at around 2,500 students. In response to declining enrollment, in September 2023, SUNY Potsdam president Suzanne Smith announced a plan to reduce the deficit of $9 million by eliminating up to 14 degree programs over the next three to five years.

== Campus ==
Undergraduate demographics as of Fall 2023
Race and ethnicity	Total
White	73%
Hispanic	10%
Black	7%
Two or more races	3%
Unknown	2%
American Indian/Alaska Native	2%
Asian	2%
International student	1%
Economic diversity
Low-income (Note: The percentage of students who received an income-based federal Pell grant intended for low-income students.)	44%
Affluent (Note: The percentage of students who are a part of the American middle class at the bare minimum.)	56%

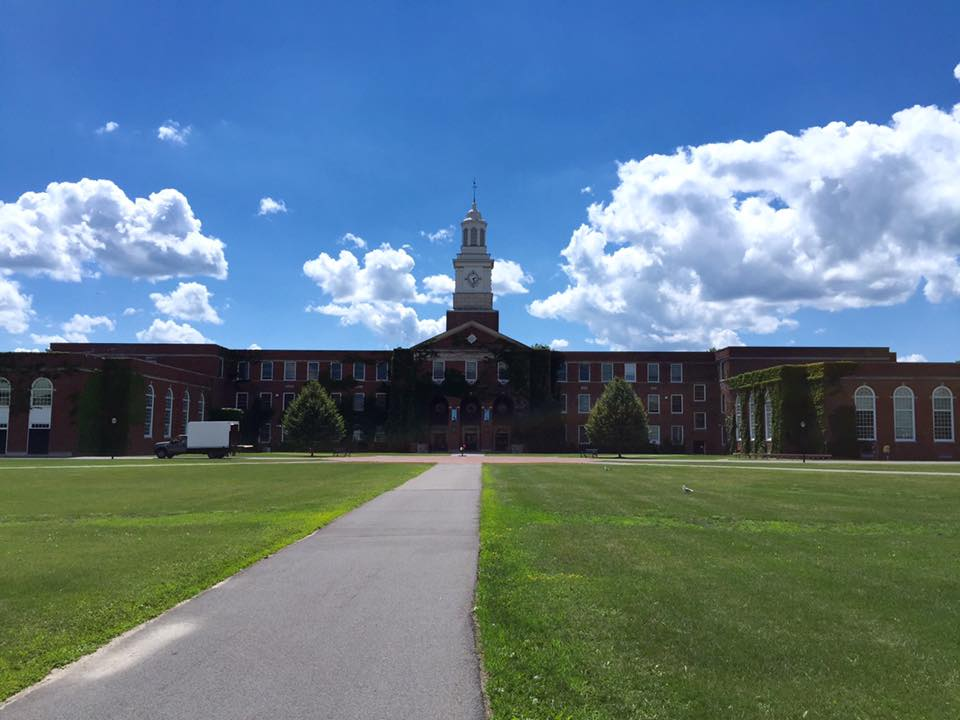
Satterlee Hall

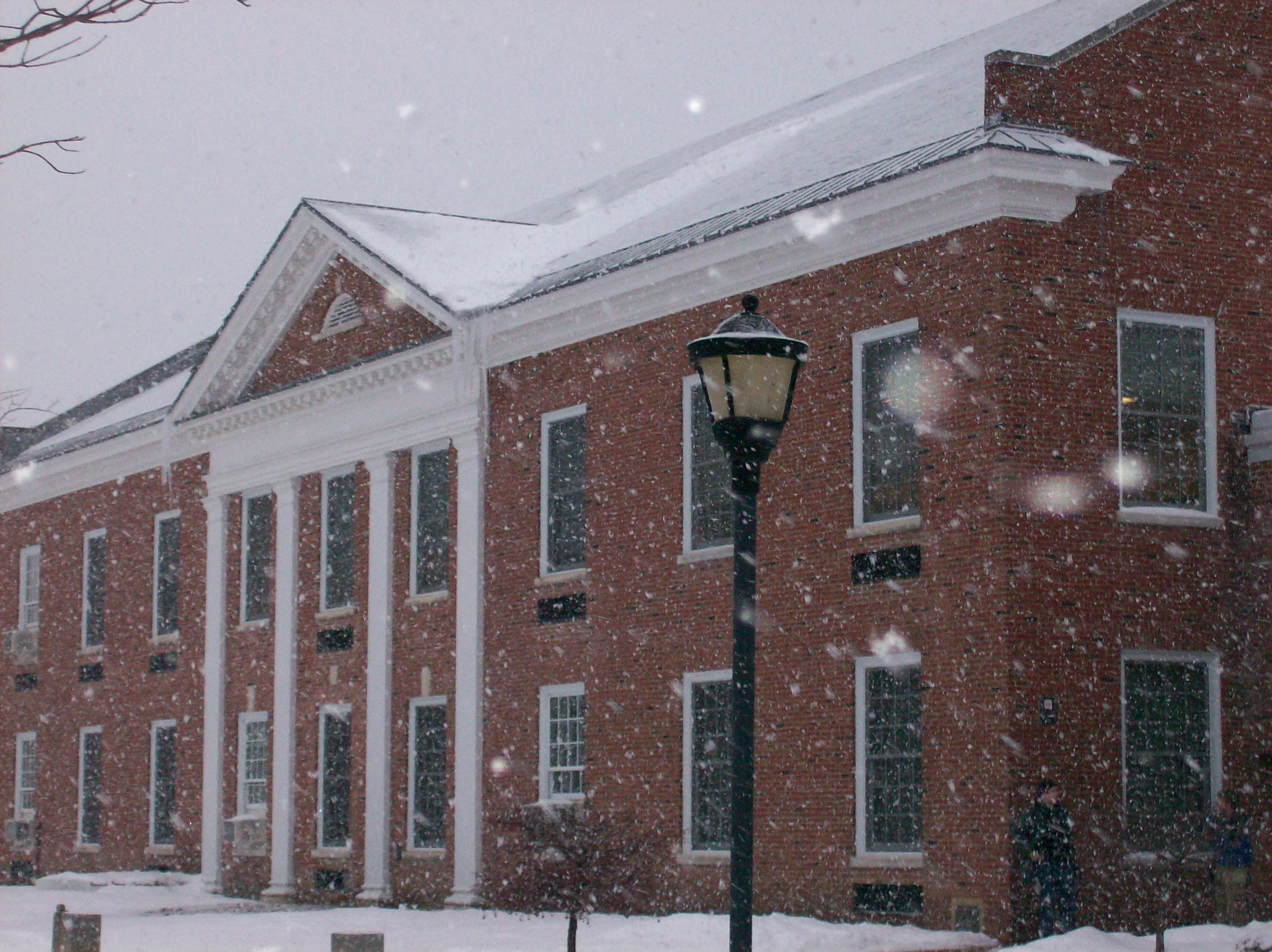
Carson Hall

The campus is in the village of Potsdam, approximately a half hour drive from the Canada–United States border. It is situated in the St. Lawrence Valley, between the St. Lawrence River and the foothills of the Adirondack Mountains, approximately 20 miles from the border of Adirondack Park. The Raquette River flows through the middle of the town of Potsdam.

The school sits on 240 acres (97 ha) and consists of 44 buildings. Barrington Drive runs through the center of the campus, with all academic buildings on the northwest side of the street, and all campus life and residence buildings on the southeast side. The Crane School of Music campus is in the northern part of the campus, east of the academic quad.

The college has two libraries, the Frederick W. Crumb Memorial Library in the center of the academic quad, and the Crane Music Library in Schuette Hall at the Crane complex. The college also has six performance facilities. Hosmer Hall, Snell Theatre, and Wakefield Recital Hall are all located in the Crane School of Music, while the Proscenium Theater, the Black Box Theater, and the Dance Theater are located in the college's new Performing Arts Center.

SUNY Potsdam is home to the Charles T. Weaver Anthropology Museum, a teaching museum that allows students to curate exhibitions and have hands on experience with the museum's collection. Also on campus is the Art Museum at SUNY Potsdam, also known as the Gibson Gallery, which stresses its mission to connect students, faculty and all those on campus with visual art. The college also houses the Maxcy Hall Athletic Facility.

The affiliated non-profit organization that provides dining services and runs the union market and college bookstore on campus is known as PACES or Potsdam Auxiliary College Education Services. This organization is the largest financial supporter of the college, annually donating significant portions of their proceeds back to the college in support of scholarships and other initiatives on campus.

== Athletics ==
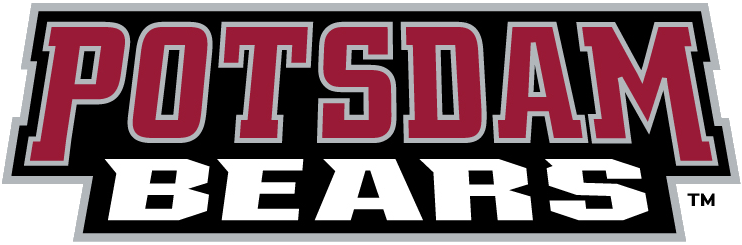
Potsdam athletics wordmark

Potsdam athletics teams are nicknamed the Bears. In 1981 and 1986, under Hall of Fame coach Jerry Welsh, the basketball team won the NCAA Division III national championship. In 1979, 1982, and 1985, the Potsdam Bears were national runners-up for this title.

The SUNY Potsdam men's ice hockey team has competed in the NCAA since 1976. Most recently, they played in the State University of New York Athletic Conference (SUNYAC), which is a Division III athletics conference. The 1995–96 men's ice hockey team won the program's only SUNYAC title in school history, under Hall of Fame coach Ed Seney.

In 2011, SUNY Potsdam athletics was placed on NCAA probation due to an inadvertent error in the awarding of international student-athlete grants. The teams affected by the NCAA probation were the men's and women's hockey, women's volleyball, men's and women's lacrosse and women's soccer and led to a two year post-season ban.

== A cappella ==
SUNY Potsdam has four a cappella groups on campus: The Potsdam Pointercounts, founded in 1993, the A Sharp Arrangement founded in 1994, the Potsdam Pitches founded in 2007 and Stay Tuned founded in 2012. All four groups have competed in International Championship of Collegiate A Cappella run by Varsity Vocals. In 2018, The Potsdam Pitches made their way to the ICCA finals and performed at the Beacon Theatre in New York City, marking the first time that a SUNY Potsdam group had made in to finals.

== Notable faculty, faculty emeriti and alumni ==
- Ernest Blood, basketball coach, enshrined in the Basketball Hall of Fame
- Stephanie Blythe, opera singer, mezzo-soprano
- T. Coraghessan Boyle, author
- Marc Butler, politician and member of the New York State Assembly
- Michael J. Colburn, 27th Director of the United States Marine Band
- Mike Deane, former Division 1 head basketball coach
- Daniel Decker, composer and recording artist
- Renée Fleming, opera singer, soprano
- Stacey Fox, percussionist, composer, filmmaker and animator
- Arthur Frackenpohl (Professor Emeritus), Composer and author
- Marion Fricano (professor), Major League Baseball pitcher for the Philadelphia and Kansas City Athletics
- David J. Hanson (professor emeritus), alcohol researcher
- Maria Hepel, chemist and distinguished professor
- Maurice Kenny (emeritus writer-in-residence), poet, editor/publisher, and essayist
- Stanley Kunitz, former U.S. poet laureate
- Chris Lee, professional hockey player, KHL All-Star, 2018 Canadian Olympian
- Chuck Lorre, television director, writer, producer, composer, and actor
- Brock McElheran (professor emeritus), conductor and author
- C. J. Rapp, entrepreneur and beverage executive (creator of Jolt Cola)
- William Buell Richards, first Chief Justice of Canada
- Stephen Savoia, two-time Pulitzer Prize-winning photographer
- Daniel Schaefer, politician, former U.S. Representative from Colorado
- Clarence F. Stephens (professor emeritus), mathematics educator
- Joy Tanner, actress
- David Valesky, politician and member of the New York State Senate
- Lisa Vroman, singer and stage actress, soprano
- Tim Welsh, former head basketball coach at Providence College
- John Zakour, writer and cartoonist
