= Slovak nationality law =

Slovak Citizenship Act

Parliament of Slovakia
- Long title: An Act relating to Slovak citizenship
- Enacted by: Government of Slovakia
- Enacted: 19 January 1993
- Status: Current legislation

Slovak nationality law is the law governing the acquisition, transmission and loss of Slovak citizenship. The Citizenship Act is a law enacted by the National Council of Slovakia in regard to the nationality law following the dissolution of Czechoslovakia. In 2010, it was controversially amended, enacting loss of Slovak citizenship upon naturalization elsewhere. This was said to have affected the 2012 election to some degree.

== Enactment of the Citizenship Act ==
Prior to 1993, the Slovak Republic was a part of the now defunct state of Czechoslovakia. On 19 January 1993, after the Slovak Republic had become a separate state, the National Council of the Slovak Republic enacted a nationality law to establish "the conditions of gain and loss of citizenship" in the newly formed republic. The law came into effect the day after its publication on 16 February. Citizenship applications would be issued by the Ministry of Interior after application with a district office. A citizen of Czechoslovakia as of 31 December 1992, who was not already a citizen of the Slovak Republic, could acquire Slovak citizenship upon declaration until 31 December 1993. Citizenship was also open to those who had lost Czechoslovak citizenship as a result of territorial dissolution after the fall of the Austro-Hungarian Empire. Under the 1993 law, a citizen could lose Slovak citizenship only at his or her own request, after having acquired citizenship in another country. However, release of citizenship would not be allowed for people who owed taxes, were under criminal investigation, serving a prison sentence or who were fugitives.

=== Amendment ===
Neighboring Hungary passed a resolution on 26 May 2010, amending its own nationality law to allow any ethnic Hungarian living abroad (who was able to speak the Hungarian language, and was a Hungarian citizen before 1920 or a descendant of a pre-1920 Hungarian citizen) to seek Hungarian citizenship. The new Hungarian law, which was enacted by a majority of 344 votes in favor with three opposed and five abstentions, elicited a reaction in the surrounding region. The strongest reaction came from Slovakia. Prime Minister Robert Fico said Hungary's action was a "security threat," because Slovakia hosts a 500,000-strong Hungarian minority community within its borders that could possibly become citizens of Hungary. That same day, Slovakia passed a motion to amend the Citizenship Act to limit dual citizenship by barring Slovak citizenship for anyone, who acquired foreign citizenship by an act of will. The amendment did not, however, bar dual citizenship for those who acquired it at birth or by marriage.

The verbal spat continued the following year when Hungarian Deputy Prime Minister and Justice Minister Tibor Navracsics complained to the European Union's Justice Commissioner Viviane Reding that the law allegedly violated the EU's Charter of Fundamental Rights in that he believed it was against the free choice of identity and that Slovakia should be punished if it was found to be in violation of the charter:

I believe the European Union must go further than saying this is a Hungarian-Slovak conflict ... because it violates the charter of fundamental rights. If a democracy robs its own citizens of their citizenship by applying sanctions against people who practice their right to a free choice of identity, I believe it becomes a problem of democracy.

The amendments affected voting in the Slovak 2012 parliamentary election, when some people who attempted to vote were turned away because they had been granted Hungarian citizenship.

== Requirements ==
Under the Citizenship Act, Slovak citizenship can be acquired by birth, adoption or grant (naturalization).

Birth

A child is a citizen upon birth if one or both parents is a Slovak citizen. Additionally a child born within the nation's territory to non-citizen parents may acquire citizenship if the parents are stateless, if the parents are unknown and there is no proof of foreign citizenship, or if the child does not choose to adopt the parents' nationality. When one parent is a citizen and the other is not, the child is considered a Slovak citizen even if the citizen parent is later determined not to be the child's actual parent.

Adoption

Citizenship is given to a child upon adoption if at least one parent is a citizen.

Grant

There are several eligibility requirements for a person to be granted citizenship. For example:

- Citizenship may be granted to a person who has had permanent residence in the country continuously for at least eight years prior to application and has satisfied the nation's obligations for foreign residents; does not have a criminal record, pending extradition hearings, or outstanding European arrest warrants; was not subject to deportation hearings or hearings for removal of asylum; and can demonstrate knowledge of the Slovak language and a general knowledge of the country.
- Former citizens who have maintained permanent residence for at least two years prior to application can be granted Slovak citizenship again.
- Grants of citizenship are available to persons who are married to Slovak citizens and have lived in Slovakia with their spouse for five years prior to application.
- Citizenship may be granted to persons who have "significantly contributed to the benefit for the Slovak Republic on economic, scientific, technical, cultural, social or sport sphere."
- Adults who resided in Slovakia on a continuous permanent basis for at least three years before the age of 18 can be granted citizenship.
- Anyone whose parent, grandparent, or great-grandparent was a Czechoslovak citizen born within Slovakia's present-day borders may apply for citizenship by descent.

Grants of citizenship can be revoked if:

- The applicant's documents are later found to have been forged or altered.
- Applicant is determined to be a different individual from information in the application.
- The applicant withheld required information that could have changed the determination on grant of citizenship.
- There was criminal action in connection with the issuance of the grant of citizenship.

In such cases, the Ministry of Interior would notify the applicants municipality, police, tax office, customs and social insurance and public health insurance institutions. Within 30 days from the date of notice the citizenship would lapse and certificates returned.

== Procedure ==
Applications are accepted by the County Administrative Authority (obvodný úrad in Slovak) or a Slovak diplomatic mission or consular office abroad and then scrutinized and sanctioned by the Ministry of Interior. After approval, the oath of citizenship must be taken within six months otherwise the application is suspended. Rejected applicants must wait at least two years to re-apply.

== Oath ==
The oath of citizenship is administered by the head of the County Administrative Authority, Slovak ambassador or Consul, or their authorized persons. It reads as follows:

In Slovak:

Sľubujem na svoju česť a svedomie, že budem verný Slovenskej republike, budem dodržiavať Ústavu Slovenskej republiky, ústavné zákony, zákony a iné všeobecne záväzné právne predpisy a riadne plniť všetky povinnosti štátneho občana Slovenskej republiky

English translation:

I promise on my honor and conscience that I will be faithful to the Slovak Republic, I will comply with the Constitution of the Slovak Republic, constitutional laws, laws and other generally binding legal regulations and properly fulfill all the duties of a citizen of the Slovak Republic

== Dual citizenship ==
Slovakia restricts its nationals from acquiring another citizenship, and upon manifesting an act of will to acquire another (through declaration or any other mode of acquisition), Slovak citizenship is automatically lost. Dual citizenship is permitted in all other cases, for instance where a person acquired an additional nationality at birth or through marriage, or if they held the additional citizenship before becoming a Slovak citizen. If a citizen of Slovakia holds another citizenship, their Slovak citizenship is considered to be dominant. In February 2022, the Slovak government passed a law allowing Slovak citizens living abroad to keep their citizenship when acquiring foreign citizenship, if they have lived in the country for which they will gain citizenship for five or more years.

== Citizenship of the European Union ==
Because Slovakia forms part of the European Union, Slovak citizens are also citizens of the European Union under European Union law and thus enjoy rights of free movement and have the right to vote in elections for the European Parliament. When in a non-EU country where there is no Slovak embassy, Slovak citizens have the right to get consular protection from the embassy of any other EU country present in that country. Slovak citizens can live and work in any country within the EU as a result of the right of free movement and residence granted in Article 21 of the EU Treaty.

== Travel freedom of Slovak citizens ==
Visa requirements for Slovak citizens

Visa requirements for Slovak citizens are administrative entry restrictions by the authorities of other states placed on citizens of Slovakia. As of 7 April 2020, Slovak citizens had visa-free or visa-on-arrival access to 181 countries and territories, ranking the Slovak passport 11th in the world according to the Visa Restrictions Index.

In 2018, Slovak nationality is ranked seventeenth in Nationality Index (QNI). This index differs from the Visa Restrictions Index, which focuses on external factors including travel freedom. The QNI considers, in addition, to travel freedom on internal factors such as peace & stability, economic strength, and human development as well.
