= Daniel Decker =

Puerto Rican composer

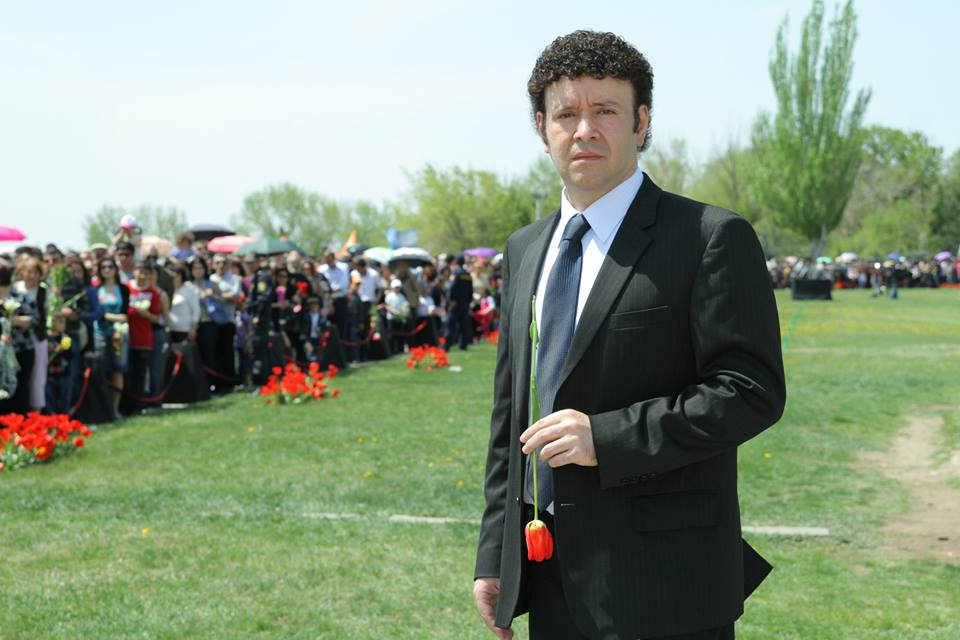

Background information
- Born: Río Piedras, Puerto Rico
- Genres: Pop, Folk, Fusion, World music
- Occupation: Composer
- Instruments: Piano, synthesizer, keyboard

Daniel Decker is a Puerto Rican composer, singer and recording artist, who has produced work blending musical influences (classical, jazz, pop and world music) from many cultures.

Decker was born in Rio Piedras, Puerto Rico. He was raised in Solvay, New York, and was trained at the Crane School of Music in New York.

He collaborated with Armenian composer Ara Gevorgian. "Noah’s Prayer" (originally entitled "Mush") chronicles Noah's journey to Mount Ararat. "Noah’s Prayer" debuted in 2002 in Sardarapat, Armenia to celebrate Armenian Independence day; in attendance were Armenian President Robert Kocharyan, Karekin II, Supreme Patriarch and Catholicos of All Armenians (head of the Armenian Apostolic Church), and ambassadors from many countries. The concert was broadcast live on Armenian television and via satellite to over 30 nations.

He later heard Gevorgian's composition "Adana" and set up a second collaboration. Named after the city where one of the first massacres of the Armenian people took place, it tells the story of the Armenian genocide; soldiers of the Ottoman Empire forced 1.5 million Armenians into starvation, torture and extermination for being Christian. As with their first collaboration, Decker wrote the song's lyrics to complement the musical landscape of Ara Gevorgian: "I wrote 'Adana' not only as a way to draw international attention to a terrible tragedy, but as a source of healing to the Armenian people."

He was invited by the Armenian government to sing it at a special concert in Yerevan, Armenia; it was broadcast live on Armenian television on April 24, 2005 to commemorate the 90th Anniversary of the Armenian Genocide. As of 2013 "Adana" had been translated into 17 languages and recorded by singers and musicians around the world.

Decker has worked with relief organizations to bring aid to the poorest regions and to children and the elderly.

He produced a CD named "My Offering" with "Noah’s Prayer and "Adana" played by the Armenian Philharmonic Orchestra, and eight tracks including, "My Offering", Decker's contribution to the world of modern worship songs, "There Is A Place", "Dust in the Wind", and "And So It Goes".
