= Julia Ettie Crane =

American music educator

Julia Ettie Crane (May 19, 1855 – June 11, 1923), also known as Julia Etta Crane, was an American music educator and the founder of the Crane School of Music. This was the first school specifically created for the training of public school music teachers. She is among the most important figures in the history of American music education. Crane was a student of Manuel García.

Crane was inducted into the Music Educators Hall of Fame in 1986.

== Sources ==
- Patricia Shehan Campbell; Rita Klinger (2000). "Learning". In Koskoff, Ellen (ed.). Garland Encyclopedia of World Music, Volume 3: The United States and Canada. Garland Publishing. pp. 274–287. ISBN 0-8240-4944-6.
- Julia Ettie Crane and her Dream
