= Slovak identity card =

National identity card of Slovakia

Slovak citizen ID card (Občiansky preukaz)
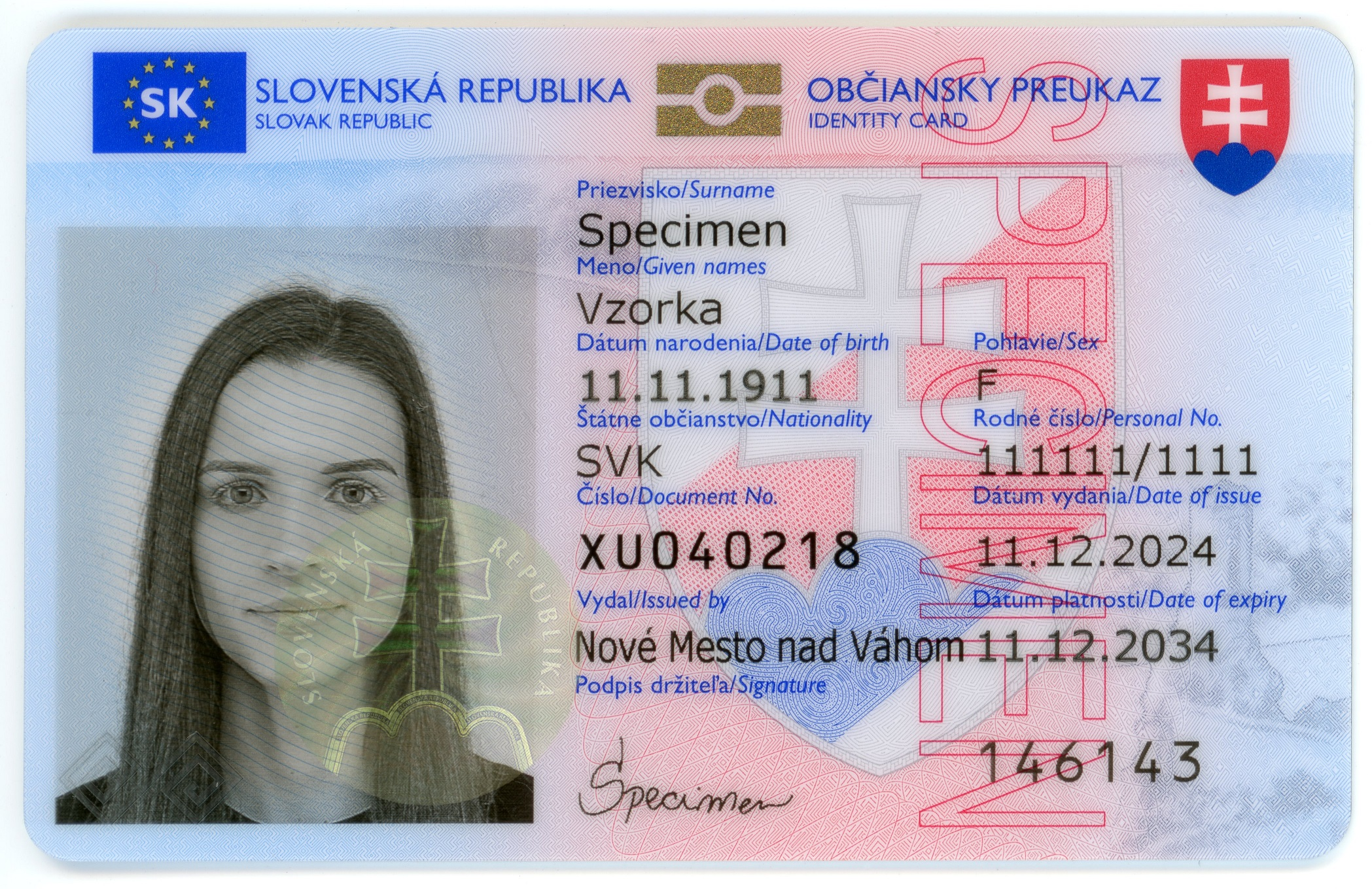
- Slovak national ID card (front)
- Issued by: Slovakia
- Purpose: Identification, travel, proof of citizenship
- Valid in: EFTA; European Union; United Kingdom (EU Settlement Scheme); Rest of Europe (except Belarus, Russia, and Ukraine) Georgia; Montserrat (max. 14 days); Overseas France
- Expiration: 10 years (age 15 or over); 5 years (age 6–14); 2 years (age under 6)

The Slovak citizen ID card (Slovak: Občiansky preukaz, citizen card, literally civic certificate) is the identity document used in the Slovak Republic (and formerly in Czechoslovakia), in addition to the Slovak passport. It is issued to all citizens, and every person above 3 years of age permanently living in Slovakia. It is required by law to hold a valid identity card.

The Slovak identity card can be used for travel anywhere in Europe (except Belarus, Russia, Turkey and Ukraine) as well as to Georgia, French overseas territories, Montserrat and organized tours to Tunisia in lieu of a passport.

A new biometric ID card with NFC chip has been issued since 1 December 2022.

== History ==
During the communist regime (1948–89) this simple card developed into a booklet dozens of pages long. It contained such personal details as employment history and vaccination records.

== See also ==
- National identity cards in the European Union
- ROCA vulnerability
- Smart card
