= Crane School of Music =

Public college in Potsdam, New York, US

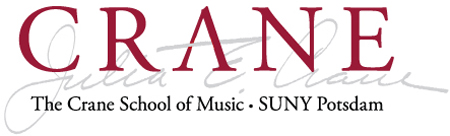
- Motto: "To learn – to search – to serve"
- Type: Public
- Established: 1886
- Dean: Andrew Mast
- Faculty: 70
- Undergraduates: 630
- Postgraduates: 30
- Location: Potsdam, New York, United States; 44.6650994°N 74.9701343°W
- Campus: Rural
- University: State University of New York at Potsdam
- Mascot: Max C. Bear
- Website: www.potsdam.edu/CRANE

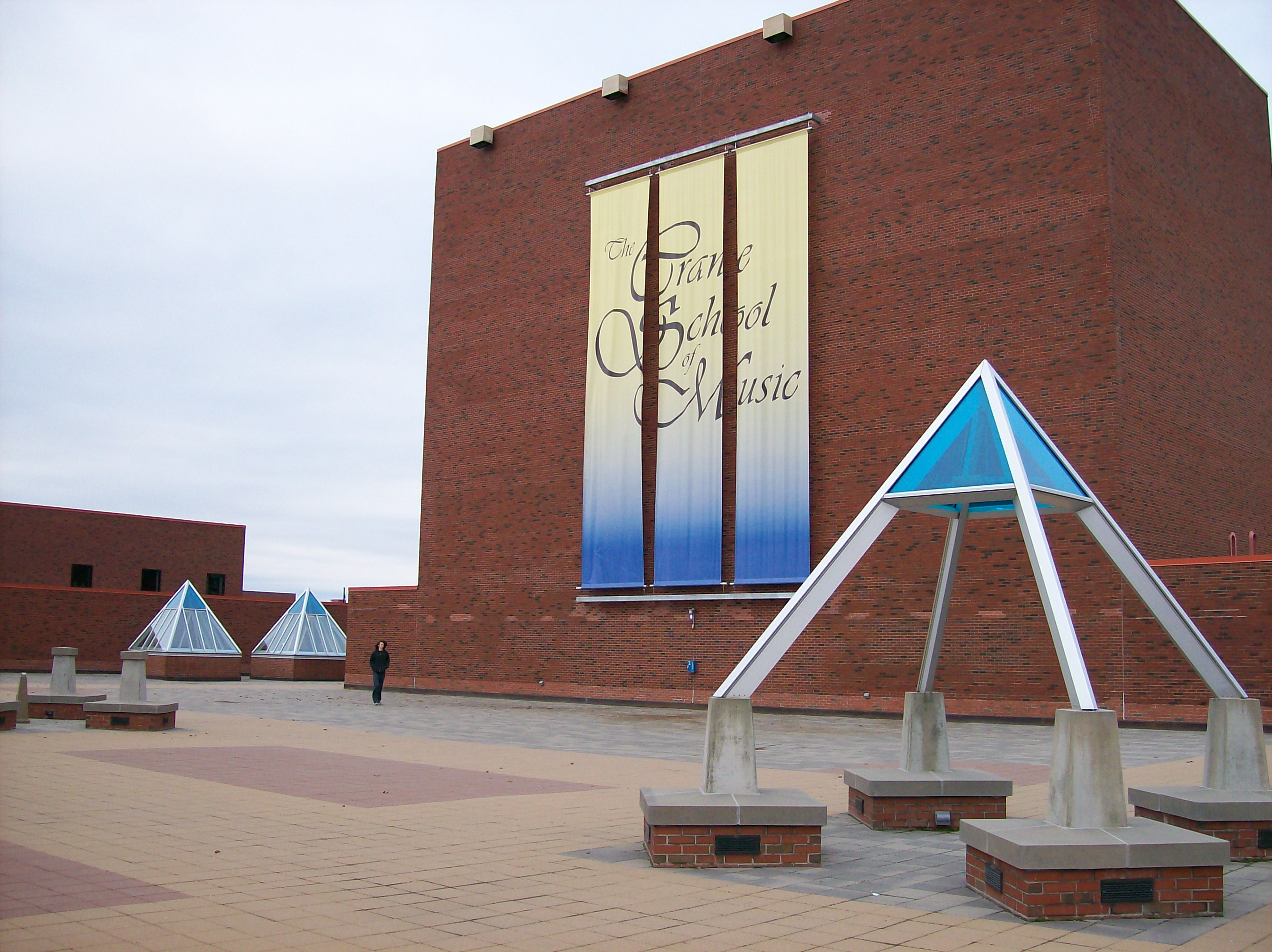
The Crane School Quad at SUNY Potsdam

The Crane School of Music is located in Potsdam, New York, and is one of three schools which make up the State University of New York (SUNY) at Potsdam.

Crane consists of approximately 630 undergraduate and 30 graduate students and a faculty of 70 teachers and professional staff in a college of 2500 students and 250 faculty. Crane is housed in the Julia E. Crane Music Center on the north side of the campus. The complex consists of four buildings: two classroom buildings (Bishop and Schuette Halls), three concert areas (the Helen M. Hosmer Concert Hall, 1290 seats, the Sara M. Snell Music Theater, 452 seats, and the Ralph Wakefield Lecture and Recital Hall located within Bishop Hall, 130 seats) as well as extensive supporting areas. Located within Schuette Hall is the Crane Music Library, which includes an extensive collection of literature, scores, and recordings. Located within the music library is a MIDI Computer Lab. All four of Crane's buildings are connected underground.

Crane became an All-Steinway School following the acquisition of 141 Steinway pianos beginning January 24, 2007. This $3.8 million purchase included three new concert grand pianos and was the largest purchase order that Steinway had ever received in the history of the company.

== History ==
The Crane School was founded in 1886 by Julia Etta Crane (1855–1923) as the Crane Normal Institute of Music, and was one of the first institutions in the country to have programs dedicated to training public school music teachers.

The school suffered from financial difficulties and around 1920, Julia Crane unsuccessfully petitioned the Juilliard Foundation to purchase the school. In 1922, the State of New York also turned down an offer to buy, but in 1926, after Crane's 1923 death, the State bought the school.

In addition to the permanent faculty, performances by the Wind Ensemble and Symphony Orchestra have been given by notable conductors as Franz Allers, Nadia Boulanger, Igor Buketoff, Sarah Caldwell, Stanley Chapple, Aaron Copland, Rodney Eichenberger, Alfred Gershfeld, Howard Hanson, Lukas Foss, Thor Johnson, Ann Howard Jones, Jan Meyerowitz, Charles O’Neill, Christof Perick, Eve Queler, Vincent Persichetti, Helmuth Rilling, Adnan Saygun, Gunther Schuller, Robert Shaw, Michael Tilson Thomas, Virgil Thomson.

Select Crane School students also have the opportunity to perform with professional ensembles in the North Country. Each year, The Northern Symphonic Winds and The Orchestra of Northern New York invite Crane students to play in their groups. Many Crane School faculty and alumni are full-time members of both NSW and ONNY.

== The Crane Symphony Orchestra ==
The Crane Symphony Orchestra was formed in 1939, the second-earliest college orchestra in the country after Harvard. The permanent conductors have been Samuel Spurbeck, Maurice Baritaud, John L. Jadlos, Richard Stephan, Christopher Lanz, Ching-Chun Lai, and Adrian Slywotzky.

== The Crane Wind Ensemble ==
The Crane Wind Ensemble comprises the most outstanding wind and percussion majors at The Crane School of Music. The CWE performs as a full wind band and also in smaller chamber groups with varied instrumentation. This group is dedicated to the performance of the finest wind repertoire, regardless of period or disposition of instrumental forces. The Crane band program is led by Dr. Brian K. Doyle, Director of Bands.

== Crane Chorus ==
The Crane Chorus was founded in 1931 by Helen M. Hosmer. It is composed almost entirely of music majors at the Crane School of Music, and usually numbers between 185 and 200 singers. Principal conductors have included Helen M. Hosmer, Brock McElheran, Calvin Gage, Stanley Romanstein, Rick Bunting, Daniel Gordon, and Jeffrey Francom.

== Crane Opera Ensemble ==
The Crane Opera Ensemble offers students performing opportunities in operatic and musical theatre productions. The ensemble began producing shows in 1924 and several recent productions have been the recipients of national awards.

Two fully staged productions are performed each year. The ensemble also hosts an opera education outreach program. The program brings in large groups of children from local schools to experience opera and engage in post-performance workshops with cast members and faculty. To date, over 4,000 children have participated in the program.

== Pellicciotti Opera Composition Prize ==
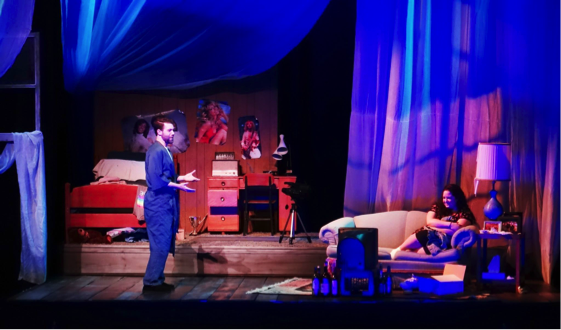
The first-prize winning premiere of "A Letter to East 11th Street"

Once every four years, the Domenic J. Pellicciotti Opera Composition Prize is awarded to a composer/librettist team developing an operatic work which explores and celebrates themes of tolerance, inclusion or diversity. Winning teams earn a commission and production award with the premiere of their work at the Crane School of Music. The prize was founded by Gary C. Jaquay to honor his life partner Domenic J. Pellicciotti, an ardent fan of opera.

The premiere of the first winners of the Pellicciotti Opera Composition Prize took place in November 2014, with the second cycle completed in November 2018 with the premiere of Tom Cipullo's Mayo.

The following is a list of the winning works:

- Computing Venus (Timothy C. Takach, Libretto by Caitlin Vincent), Nov. 2024
- Mayo (Tom Cipullo), Nov. 2018
- In a Mirror, Darkly (Christopher Weiss, Libretto by S. O’Duinn Magee), Nov. 2014
- The Fox and the Pomegranate (Matt Frey, Libretto by Daniel J. Kushner), Nov. 2014
- A Letter to East 11th Street (Martin Hennessey, Libretto by Mark Campbell), Nov. 2014

== Community Performance Series ==
Crane has played home to the Community Performance Series (CPS) since 1989. CPS brings outside artists in to perform at Crane. Often a visiting artist will also conduct a master class during their time at the school. A pre-concert lecture is also given by a member of the faculty on the evening of the concert.

== Notable faculty and alumni ==
- Stephanie Blythe (1992) – operatic mezzo-soprano and contralto
- Michael J. Colburn – 27th Director of the United States Marine Band
- Daniel Decker – composer and recording artist
- Renée Fleming (1981) – operatic soprano
- Stacey Fox (1987 and 1989) - percussionist, composer, filmmaker and animator
- Arthur Frackenpohl – Professor Emeritus
- John Geggie – bassist
- Donald George – American operatic tenor
- Dan Graser – soprano saxophonist for the Sinta Quartet, Associate Professor of Saxophone Grand Valley State University
- Brock McElheran – professor emeritus
- Barton McLean – composer
- John O'Reilly - composer
- David Pittman-Jennings - American opera singer
- Jessica Suchy-Pilalis – harpist, Byzantine singer and composer
- Lisa Vroman (1979) – musical theatre and opera crossover
- Jay Wanamaker – President and CEO, Roland Corporation U.S.
- James (Jim) Petercsak - Percussionist, Former President of the Percussive Arts Society
