= Bedford Hills, New York =

Hamlet in Westchester County, New York

- Hamlet & CDP
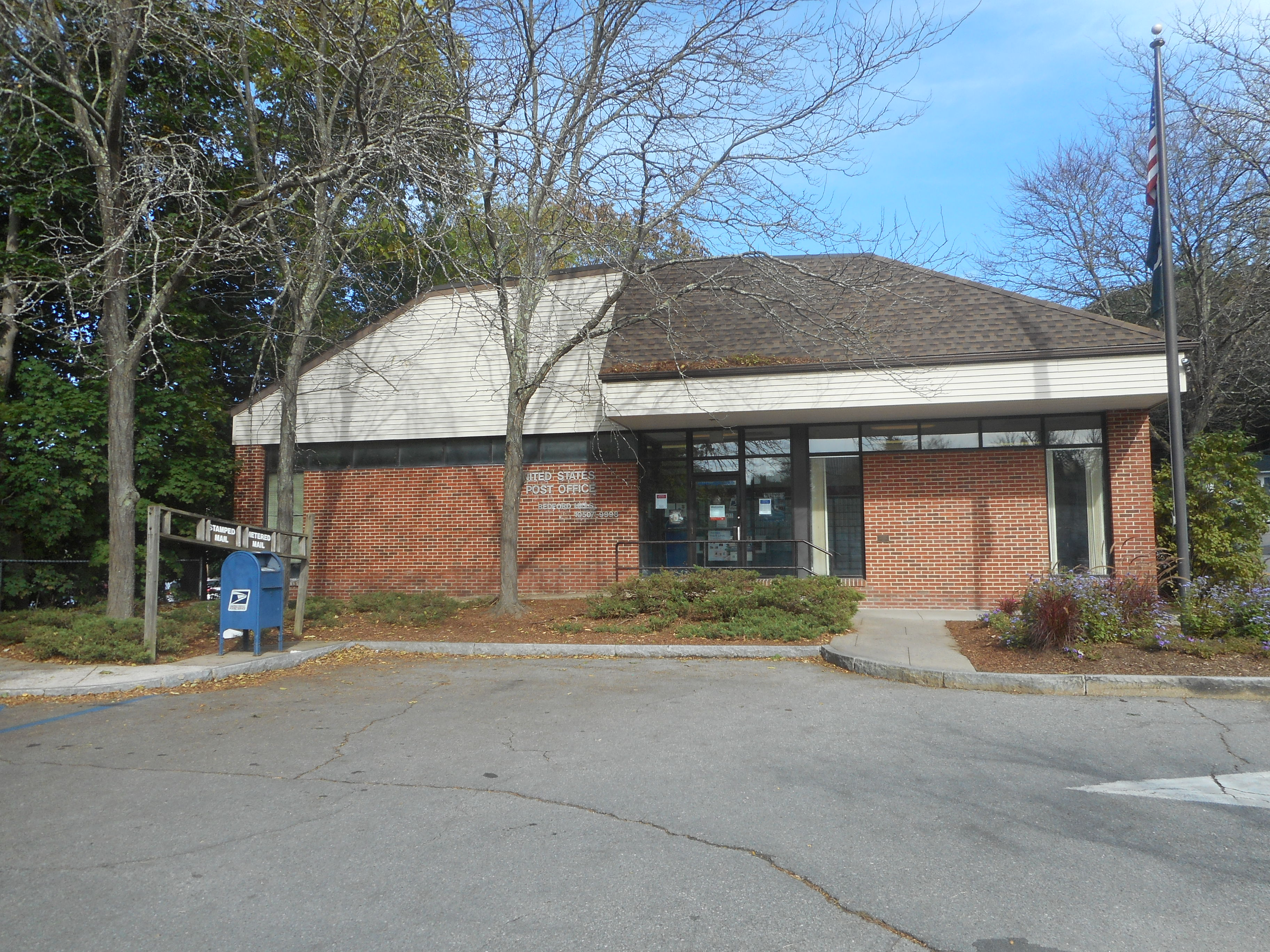
- Bedford Hills post office

- Location of Bedford Hills, New York
- Coordinates: 41°14′12″N 073°41′40″W
- Country: United States
- State: New York
- County: Westchester County
- Town: Bedford

Area
  - Total: 1.03 sq mi (2.66 km^{2})
  - Land: 1.03 sq mi (2.66 km^{2})
  - Water: 0 sq mi (0.00 km^{2})
- Elevation: 341 ft (104 m)

Population (2020)
  - Total: 3,239
  - Density: 3,159.3/sq mi (1,219.82/km^{2})
- Time zone: UTC−5 (Eastern (EST))
  - Summer (DST): UTC−4 (EDT)
- ZIP Code: 10507
- Area code: 914
- FIPS code: 36-05342
- GNIS feature ID: 943491

Bedford Hills is a hamlet and census-designated place (CDP) in the town of Bedford, Westchester County, New York, United States. As of the 2020 census, Bedford Hills had a population of 3,239. Two New York State prisons for women, Bedford Hills Correctional Facility for Women and Taconic Correctional Facility, are located in the hamlet.

== History ==
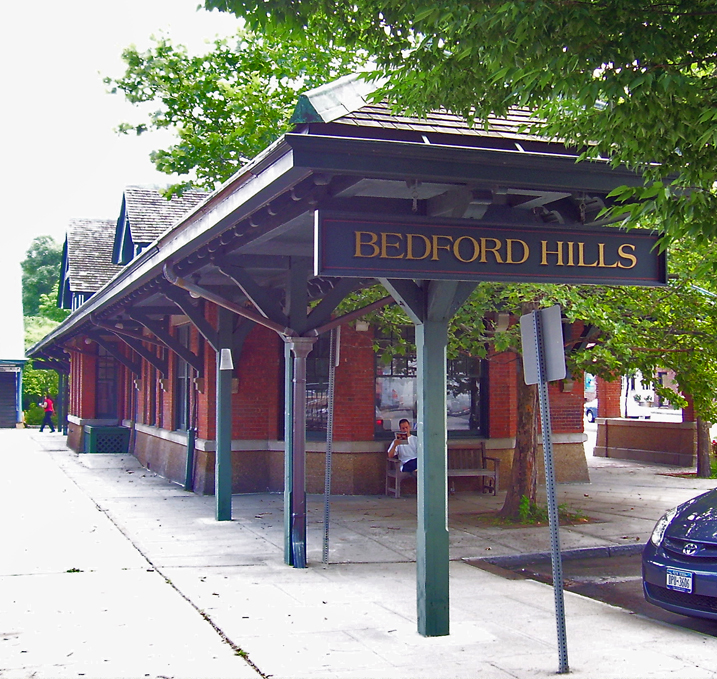
Old Bedford Hills station next to the Bedford Hills Metro-North station

When the railroad was built in 1847, Bedford Hills was known as Bedford Station. Bedford Hills extends from a business center at the railroad station to farms and estates, eastward along Harris, Babbitt and Bedford Center roads and south along the Route 117 business corridor up to Mt. Kisco. Bedford Hills is the seat of government of the town of Bedford. The Town House, built in 1927, and Town buildings containing the Police Department and Town offices are located in Bedford Hills.

The Richard H. Mandel House, designed by Edward Durell Stone, was added to the National Register of Historic Places in 1996.

Bedford Hills is the site of Stepping Stones, the historic home of Alcoholics Anonymous co-founder Bill W. and his wife Lois Burnham Wilson, founder of Al-Anon/Alateen. The home, located at 62 Oak Road in Katonah, is on the National Register of Historic Places, and has become a tour destination for members of 12 Step organizations.

The Community House located on Church Street, was originally built in 1919 to serve the needs of returning World War I veterans. Following that time, it was used for potluck suppers, theater productions, and sport activities.

== Geography ==
Bedford Hills is located at 41°14′12″N 073°41′40″W (41.2367613, -73.6945751) and its elevation is 341 feet (104 m).

According to the United States Census Bureau, Bedford Hills has a total area of 1.006 square miles (2.61 km^{2}), all land.

Climate data for Bedford Hills, New York, 1899–1977
Month	Jan	Feb	Mar	Apr	May	Jun	Jul	Aug	Sep	Oct	Nov	Dec	Year
Mean daily maximum °F (°C)	37 (3)	38 (3)	48 (9)	60 (16)	72 (22)	80 (27)	85 (29)	82 (28)	76 (24)	65 (18)	52 (11)	40 (4)	61 (16)
Mean daily minimum °F (°C)	20 (−7)	20 (−7)	29 (−2)	38 (3)	48 (9)	57 (14)	62 (17)	60 (16)	54 (12)	43 (6)	34 (1)	24 (−4)	41 (5)
Average precipitation inches (mm)	3.23 (82)	3.05 (77)	3.71 (94)	3.78 (96)	3.75 (95)	3.87 (98)	4.53 (115)	4.55 (116)	4.20 (107)	3.49 (89)	3.44 (87)	3.73 (95)	45.33 (1,151)
Average snowfall inches (cm)	8.9 (23)	10.2 (26)	7.5 (19)	1.1 (2.8)	0 (0)	0 (0)	0 (0)	0 (0)	0 (0)	0 (0)	1.2 (3.0)	7.9 (20)	36.8 (93)
Average precipitation days (≥ .01 in)	9	8	9	10	10	10	10	9	8	7	8	9	109
Source: Western Regional Climate Center

== Demographics ==
Historical population
Census	Pop.	Note	%±
2020	3,239		—
U.S. Decennial Census

=== 2020 census ===
As of the 2020 census, Bedford Hills had a population of 3,239. The median age was 38.6 years. 23.7% of residents were under the age of 18 and 15.1% of residents were 65 years of age or older. For every 100 females there were 96.8 males, and for every 100 females age 18 and over there were 90.7 males age 18 and over.

100.0% of residents lived in urban areas, while 0.0% lived in rural areas.

There were 1,168 households in Bedford Hills, of which 37.7% had children under the age of 18 living in them. Of all households, 49.7% were married-couple households, 15.4% were households with a male householder and no spouse or partner present, and 29.2% were households with a female householder and no spouse or partner present. About 26.6% of all households were made up of individuals and 12.0% had someone living alone who was 65 years of age or older.

There were 1,229 housing units, of which 5.0% were vacant. The homeowner vacancy rate was 2.4% and the rental vacancy rate was 3.4%.

Racial composition as of the 2020 census
Race	Number	Percent
White	1,664	51.4%
Black or African American	164	5.1%
American Indian and Alaska Native	28	0.9%
Asian	112	3.5%
Native Hawaiian and Other Pacific Islander	0	0.0%
Some other race	764	23.6%
Two or more races	507	15.7%
Hispanic or Latino (of any race)	1,431	44.2%

== Local media ==
The Record-Review, a weekly newspaper, reports on local issues in Bedford, Bedford Hills, Katonah, and Pound Ridge. The newspaper began publishing in 1995.

== Schools ==
Bedford Hills Elementary School is a K–5 school that many children in the town attend. Bedford Hills is one of five schools in the Bedford Central School District where older students attend Fox Lane Middle School and High School.

The Bedford Hills Free Library is located in Bedford Hills and is a member of the Westchester Library System.

== Centennial ==
In May 2010, Bedford Hills celebrated its centennial with a number of community-wide events, including a scavenger hunt and a pie baking contest. This event celebrated the town's name change from Bedford Station to Bedford Hills. This event was organized with help from the Bedford Hills Historical Museum.

== Notable people ==
- Gertrude Berg, actress, screenwriter, producer.
- Glenn Close, actress
- Michael Douglas and Catherine Zeta-Jones, actors
- Kimya Dawson, musician
- Charles Frankel, philosopher
- Nan Hayworth, former Congresswoman.
- Barnard Hughes, actor
- Janet Lee, psychic
- Abbie Ives, professional ice hockey player
- Michael J. Knowles, American conservative political commentator
- George Soros, billionaire hedge fund investor
- Julie Strauss-Gabel, editor of acclaimed young adult literature
- Bruce Willis, actor
- Bill W., co-founder Alcoholics Anonymous; Bill's home Stepping Stones (house) is a museum in Bedford Hills, NY
