= Pine Bluff Civic Center =

- U.S. National Register of Historic Places
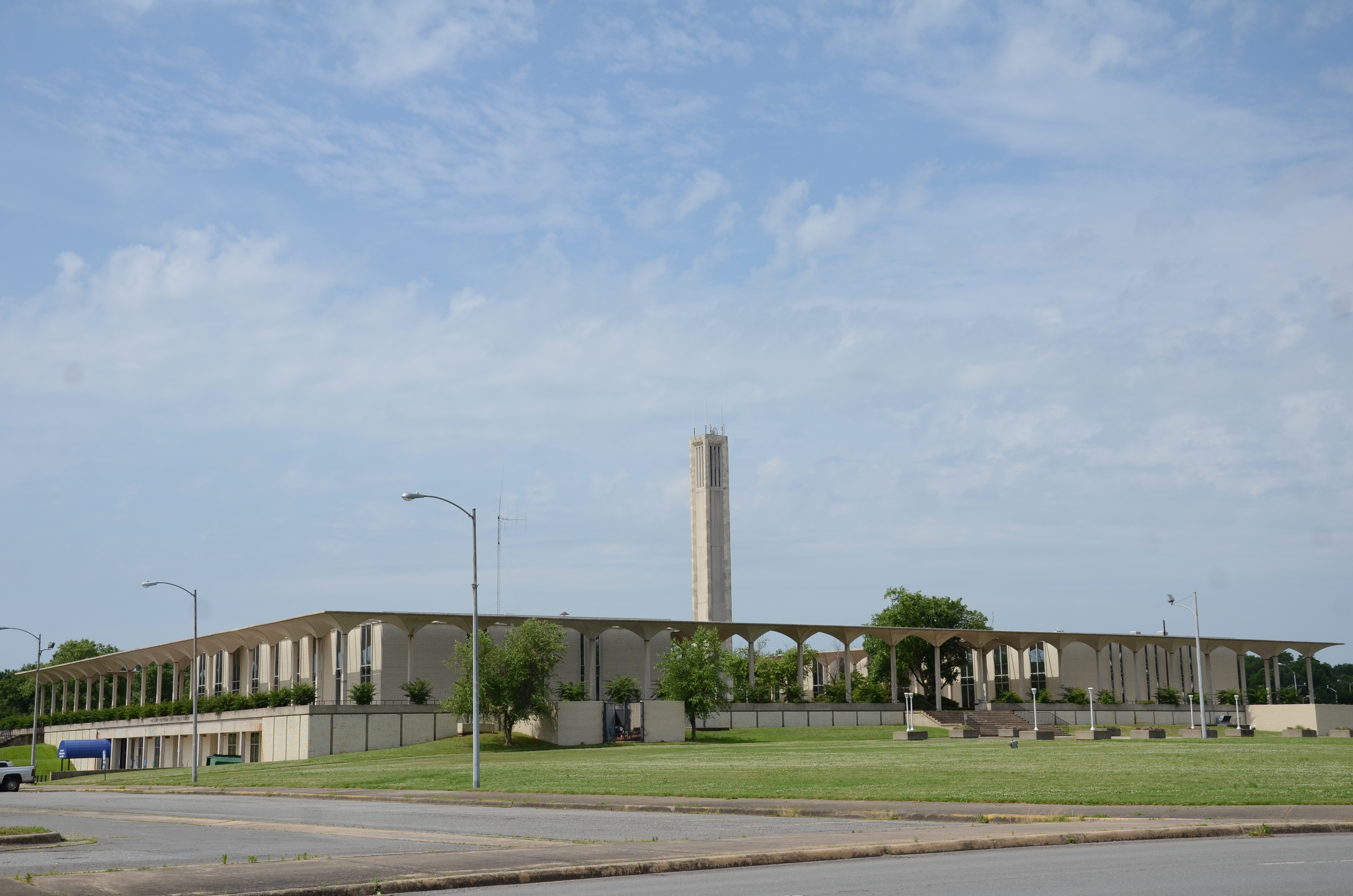

- Location within Arkansas Location within the United States
- Location: 200 E. 8th Ave., Pine Bluff, Arkansas
- Coordinates: 34.22037°N 92.00111°W
- Area: 10 acres (4.0 ha)
- Architect: Edward Durell Stone
- Architectural style: Modern Movement
- NRHP reference No.: 05000496
- Added to NRHP: June 1, 2005

The Pine Bluff Civic Center is the center of municipal government for the city of Pine Bluff, Arkansas. It is located at 200 East 8th Avenue in downtown Pine Bluff. The building is a colonnaded complex of three structures, designed by Arkansas architects Edward Durell Stone and his son Edward Jr., and built from 1963 to 1968. It was the only such civic commission of the elder Stone in his native state, and followed his 1959 groundbreaking work on the United States Embassy in New Delhi.

The center was listed on the National Register of Historic Places in 2005.

== See also ==
- National Register of Historic Places listings in Jefferson County, Arkansas
