= Edward Durell Stone =

American architect (1902–1978)

- Born: March 9, 1902; Fayetteville, Arkansas, U.S.
- Died: August 6, 1978 (aged 76); New York City, U.S.
- Education: University of Arkansas, Harvard University, M.I.T.
- Occupation: Architect
- Buildings: Parliament House of Pakistan, Radio City Music Hall, Museum of Modern Art, Kennedy Center, 2 Columbus Circle, First Canadian Place, Aon Center, University at Albany Uptown Campus
- Design: New Formalism with Neoclassical design influences

Edward Durell Stone (March 9, 1902 – August 6, 1978) was an American architect known for the formal, highly decorative buildings he designed in the 1950s and 1960s. His works include the Museum of Modern Art, in New York City; the Parliament House of Pakistan in Islamabad; the Museo de Arte de Ponce in Ponce, Puerto Rico; the United States Embassy in New Delhi, India; The Keller Center at the University of Chicago; the John F. Kennedy Center for the Performing Arts in Washington, D.C., the EcoTarium, formerly known as the New England Science Center in Worcester, Massachusetts; and the campus of Windham College (which became Landmark College) in Putney, Vermont.

== Early life ==
Stone was born and raised in Fayetteville, Arkansas. He attended the University of Arkansas, where he joined the Sigma Nu fraternity, Harvard and M.I.T., but did not earn a degree. In 1927, he won the Rotch Travelling Scholarship, which afforded him the opportunity to travel through Europe on a two-year stipend. Stone was impressed by the new architecture he observed in Europe, buildings designed in what would come to be known as the International Style. He returned to the United States in 1929 and took up residence in Manhattan.

== Career ==
Hired by the architectural firm of Schultze and Weaver, he designed interiors for the new Waldorf-Astoria Hotel. He subsequently worked for the Associated Architects of Rockefeller Center and became the principal designer of Radio City Music Hall.

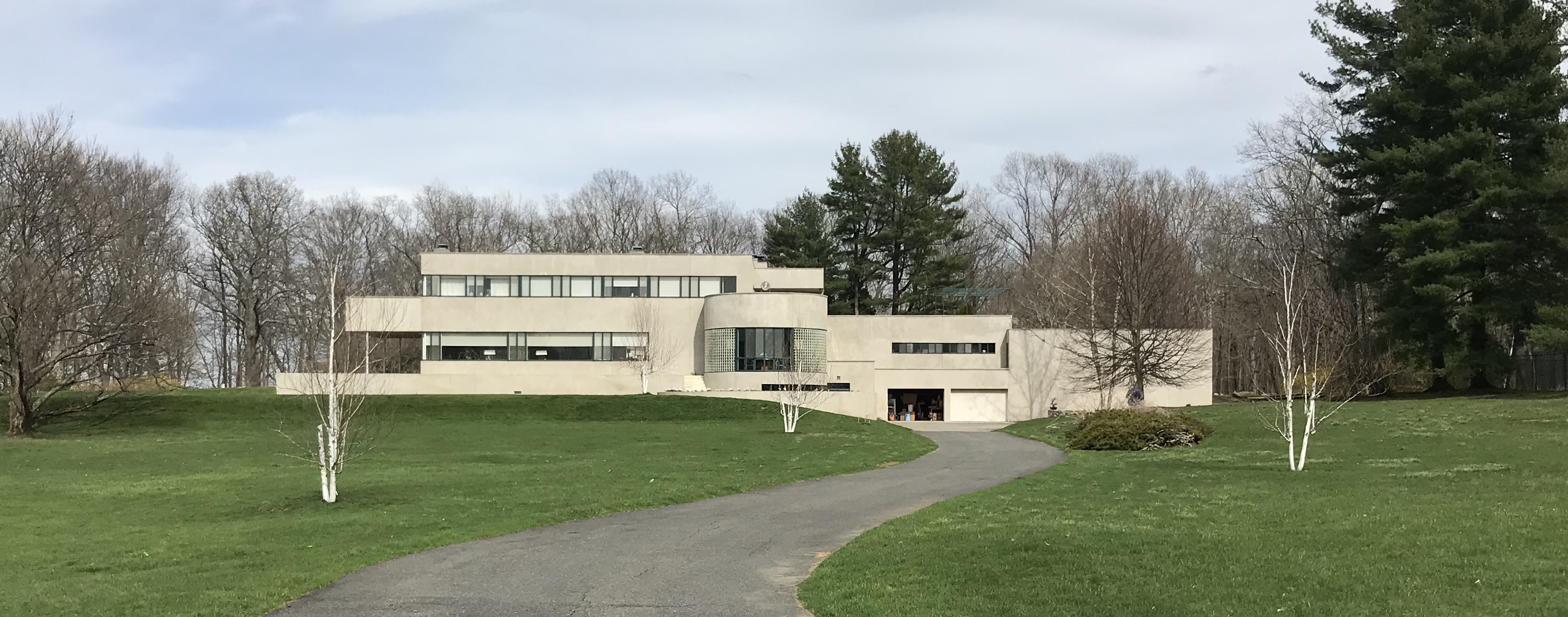
Richard H. Mandel House, Mt. Kisco, New York (1933)

Stone was an early advocate of the International Style. His first independent commission was the Richard H. Mandel House, in Mount Kisco, New York (1933). This was followed by the Ulrich Kowalski house, also in Mt. Kisco (1934), and the Albert C. Koch house in Cambridge, Massachusetts (1936). (Note: The Koch house was designed in association with Carl Koch Jr.) In 1936, Stone was chosen as associate architect for the new Museum of Modern Art in New York City, designed in collaboration with Philip L. Goodwin. Stone also designed a private residence for MoMA president Anson Conger Goodyear, the A. Conger Goodyear House, in Old Westbury, New York (1938). Both the Richard H. Mandel House and A. Conger Goodyear House are listed on the National Register of Historic Places.

At the outset of World War II, Stone enlisted in the U.S. Army. He was promoted to the rank of major and served as chief of the Army Air Force Planning and Design Section. Returning to New York after the war, Stone was commissioned to design the ten-story El Panama Hotel in Panama City, Panama (1946), the University of Arkansas Fine Arts Center in Fayetteville (1948), and the 850-bed Hospital del Seguro Social del Empleado in Lima, Peru (1950). (Note: The hospital was designed in association with Alfred L. Aydelott.)

Stone's career and personal life were in deep flux by the end of the 1940s. His alcoholism led to the failure of his first marriage. After the 1950 divorce, Stone had retreated to Paris where he was living in a houseboat on the Seine, drinking, and doing little work when his friends Allan Jacobs and Hans Knoll came to retrieve him to help sober him up for an opportunity to design an embassy building through the Foreign Buildings Operations (FBO) of the United States.

By 1953, the Architectural Advisory Committee, which advised FBO on which established or rising American architects to employ for the massive Cold War embassy building program, included architect Henry R. Shepley, Ralph T. Walker and Pietro Belluschi. Stone knew Shepley and Walker from his student days at the Boston Architectural Club, and Shepley had given Stone an early project. Ultimately, Shepley vouched for Stone and convinced the committee and FBO that he had reformed and possessed the talent and dedication to complete an embassy project, and a contract to design an embassy in India was eventually signed in March 1954.

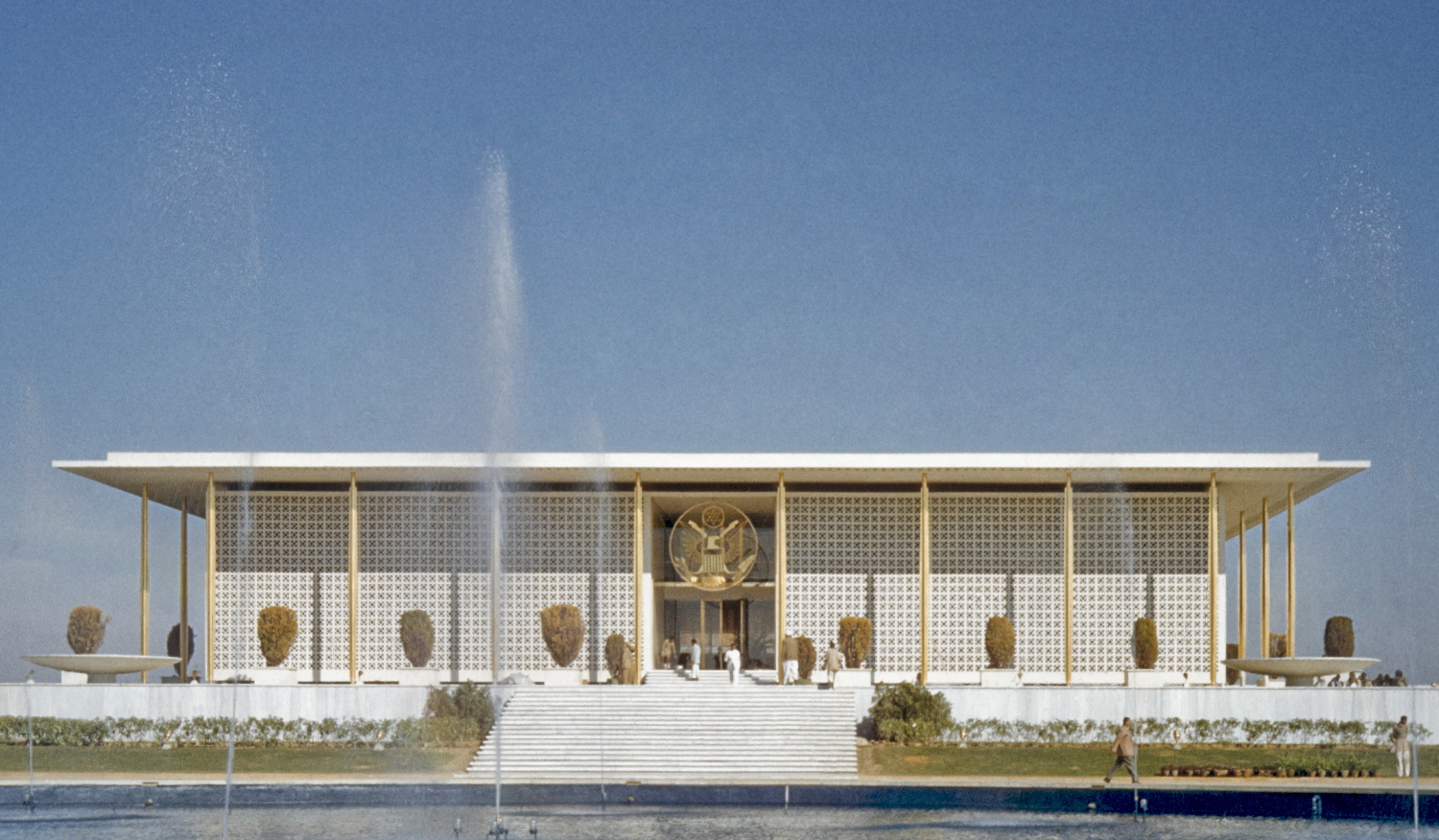
U.S. Embassy in New Delhi, India (1959)

The Embassy of the United States in New Delhi, India (1959) would become Stone's best known work and make his career. Tasked with creating a modern building that respected the architectural heritage of its host country, he designed a temple-like pavilion on a raised podium. Frank Lloyd Wright called the embassy one of the most beautiful buildings he had ever seen, and it won a first honor award from the American Institute of Architects (AIA). Subsequent commissions such as the Stanford University Medical Center in Palo Alto, California (1955), the Stuart Pharmaceutical Company in Pasadena, California (1956), and the United States pavilion at the 1958 Brussels World's Fair (1957), repeated elements originally designed for the embassy. The Stuart building and World's Fair pavilion both won awards from the AIA, and Stone was elected to the Institute's College of Fellows in 1958.

Described as romanticist, Stone's ornate designs brought him commercial success. By the 1960s, his firm was among the largest architectural practices in the United States, with over 200 employees and offices on both coasts. Buildings from this period include the North Carolina State Legislative Building in Raleigh (1960), the Pakistan Institute of Nuclear Science and Technology in Nilore (1961), the National Geographic Society building in Washington, D.C. (1961), the Museo de Arte in Ponce, Puerto Rico (1961), the uptown campus of the University at Albany (1962), the John F. Kennedy Center for the Performing Arts in Washington, D.C. (1962), the General Motors Building in New York City (1964), the PepsiCo World Headquarters, in Purchase, New York (1967), and the EcoTarium in Worcester, Massachusetts, the Florida State Capital complex in Tallahassee, and the Standard Oil building (now known as the Aon Center) in Chicago, Illinois (all 1970).

Stone also was the architect of the former Windham College in Putney, Vermont. Windham closed in 1978 and its abandoned campus was taken over by the present-day Landmark College in 1985.

Furthermore, Stone also designed Harvey Mudd College in Claremont, California. Harvey Mudd College is a highly ranked private liberal arts college, and according to Travel and Leisure Magazine in 2013, is one of "America's ugliest college campuses".

Stone retired in 1974 and died in 1978. Following a New York City funeral his ashes were buried in his hometown of Fayetteville.

== Personal life ==
Stone had five children from three different marriages. His first marriage, to Orlean Vandiver, ended in divorce due to his alcoholism in 1950; they had two children, Edward Durell Jr. and Robert Vandiver. He met his second wife, Maria Elena Torch, on a transatlantic flight in 1953; his continuing struggles with alcohol led to her ultimatum that he credited with keeping him sober for the rest of his life; they married in 1954 and had a son, Benjamin Hicks III, in 1955 and a daughter, Francesca. A combination of the age gap between the two, Stone was 23-years older than Maria, and their mutual infidelities led to a public and messy divorce that was widely reported in New York City where they resided. In 1972, he married a third time to Violet Campbell Moffat, they had one daughter, Fiona.

== Honors and awards ==
=== Honorary degrees ===
- Doctor of Fine Arts, University of Arkansas, 1951
- Doctor of Fine Arts, Colby College, 1959
- Master of Fine Arts, Otis Art Institute of Los Angeles County, 1961
- Doctor of Fine Arts, Hamilton College, 1962

=== Memberships and honors ===
- Medal of Honor, New York Chapter of the American Institute of Architects, 1955
- American Institute of Architects, Fellow, 1958
- National Institute of Arts & Letters, Member, 1958
- National Urban League, Trustee, 1958
- American Academy of Arts & Sciences, Fellow, 1960
- American Federation of Arts, Trustee, 1960
- National Institute of Social Sciences, Gold Medal, 1961
- Building Stone Institute, Architect of the Year, 1964
- Horatio Alger Award, 1971

=== Architectural awards ===
- Silver Medal, Architectural League of New York, 1937 – Guest House for Henry R. Luce, Mepkin Plantation, Moncks Corner, South Carolina
- Silver Medal, Architectural League of New York, 1950 – A. Conger Goodyear Residence, Old Westbury, New York
- Gold Medal, Architectural League of New York, 1950 – Museum of Modern Art, New York City (Philip Goodwin, Associate)
- Gold Medal, Architectural League of New York, 1950 – El Panama Hotel, Panama City, Panama
- First Honor Award, American Institute of Architects, 1958 – Stuart Pharmaceutical Co., Pasadena, California
- Award of Merit, American Institute of Architects, 1958 – U.S. Pavilion, Brussels, Belgium
- First Honor Award, American Institute of Architects, 1961 – U.S. Embassy, New Delhi, India
- Award of Merit, American Institute of Architects, 1963 – Community Hospital of the Monterey Peninsula, Carmel, California
- Honor Award, American Institute of Architects, 1967 – Ponce Museum of Art, Ponce, Puerto Rico

== Selected works ==
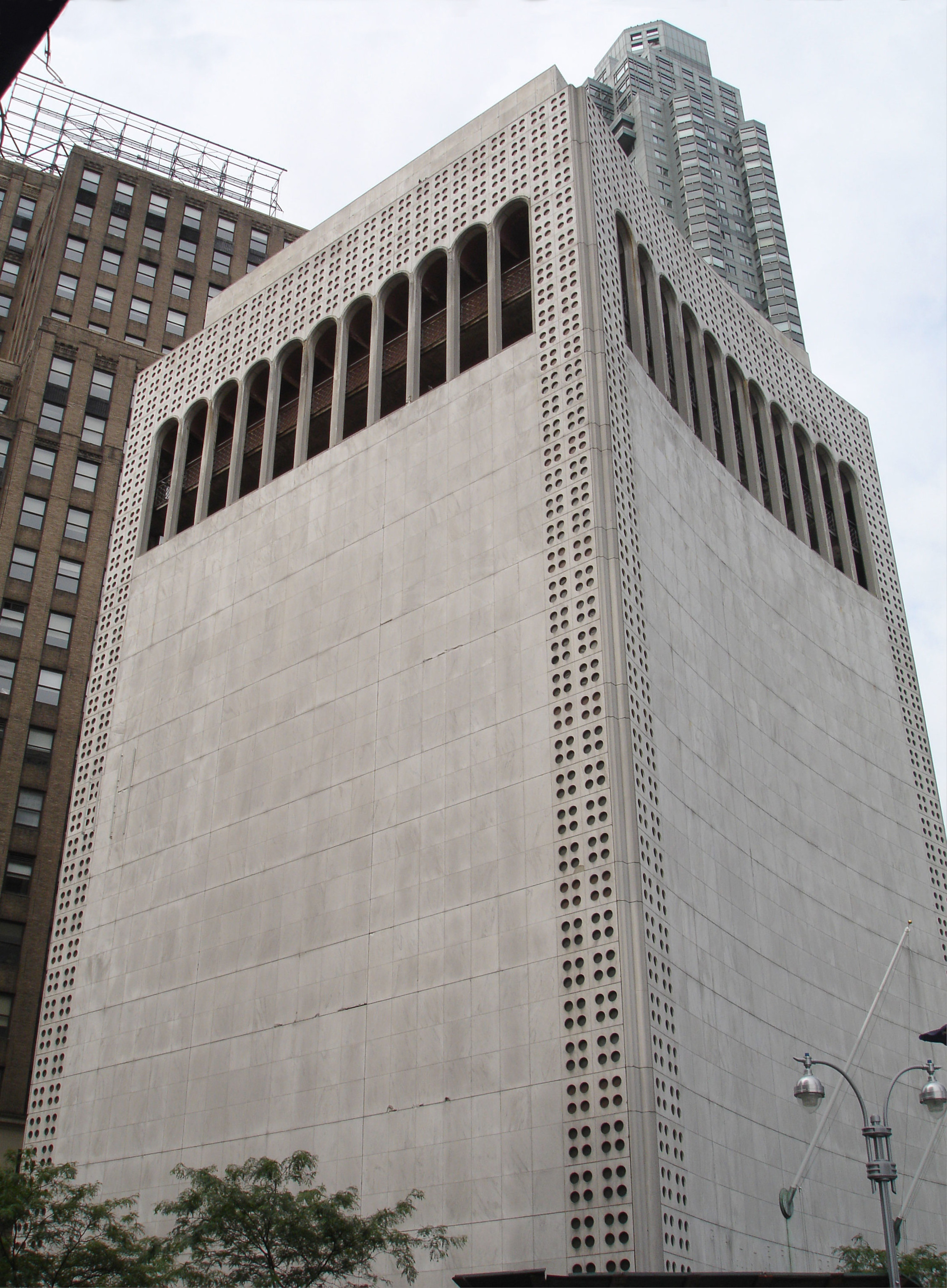
2 Columbus Circle, New York City (1958), before the facade was altered and the interior renovated

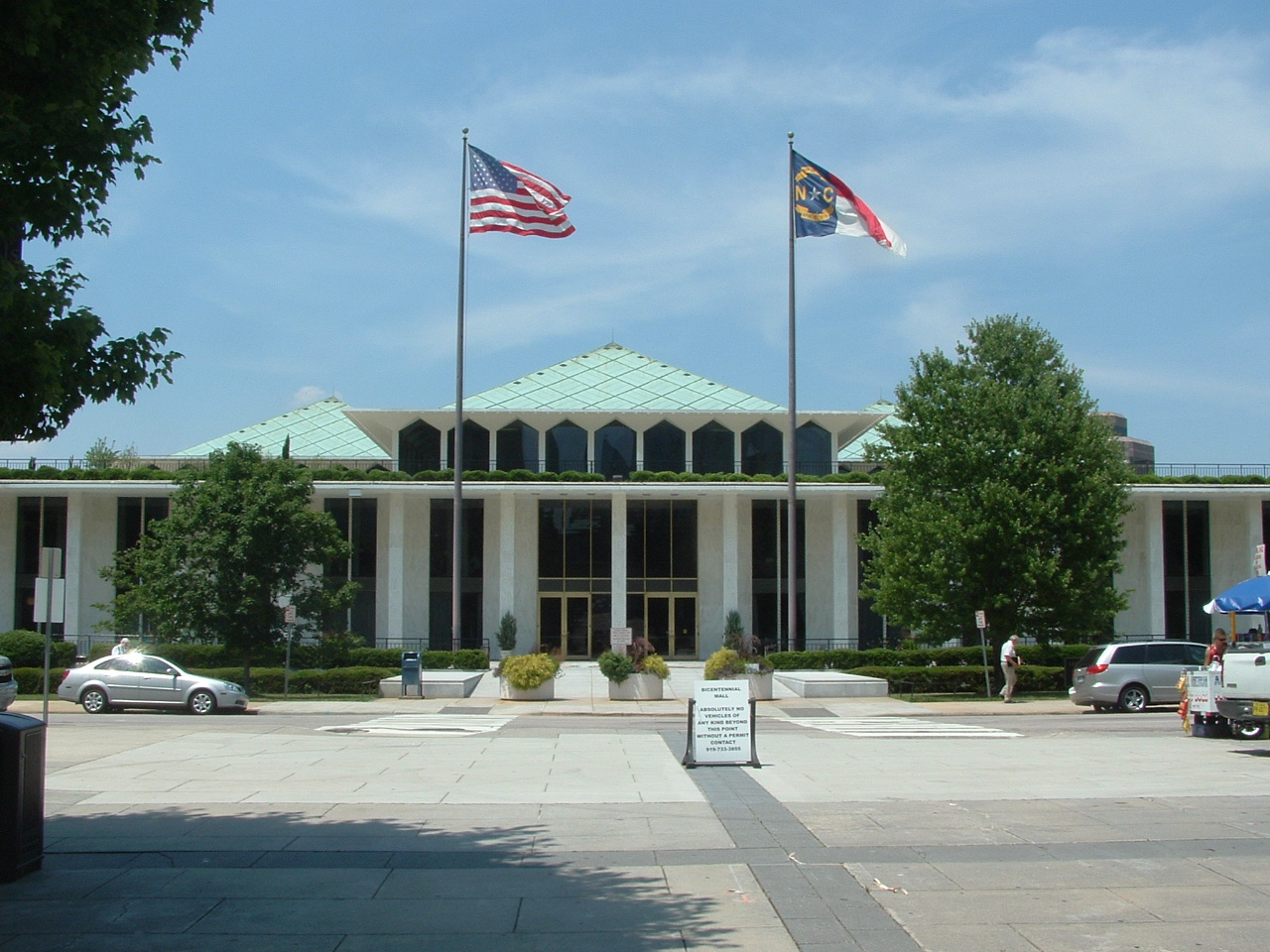
North Carolina State Legislative Building in Raleigh, North Carolina (1960)

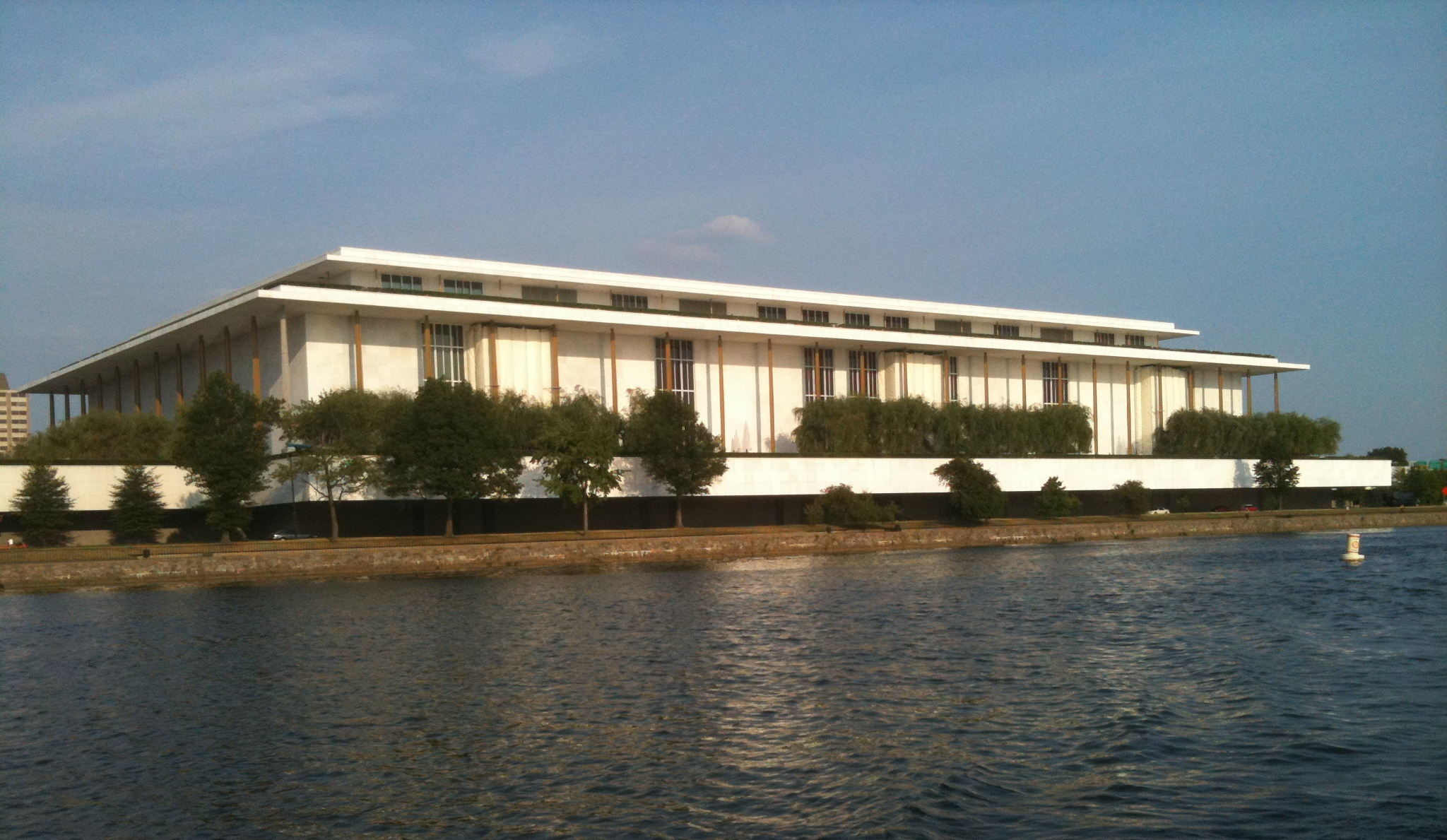
Kennedy Center for the Performing Arts, Washington, D.C. (1962)

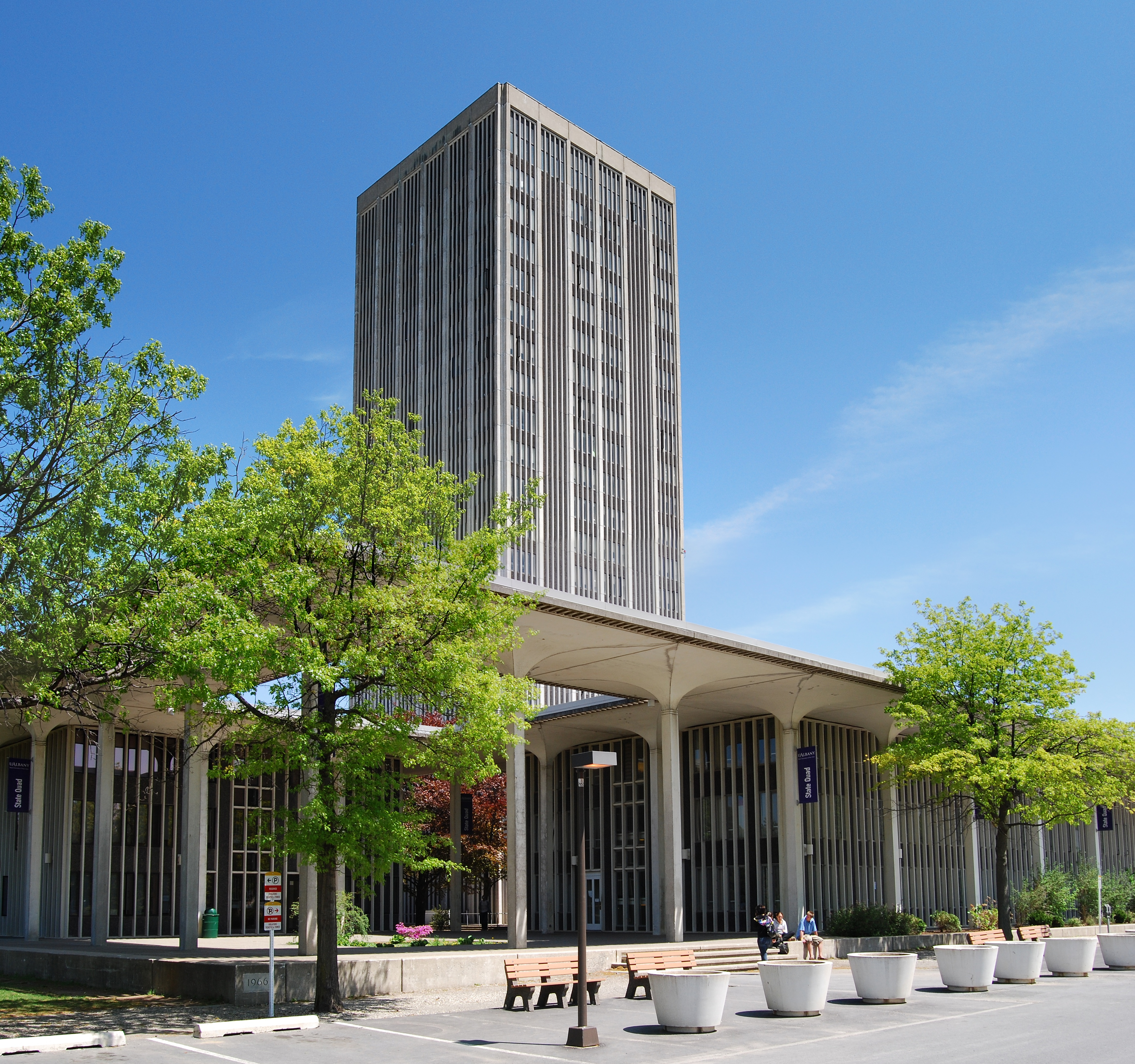
The Uptown Campus of the State University of New York at Albany (1962)

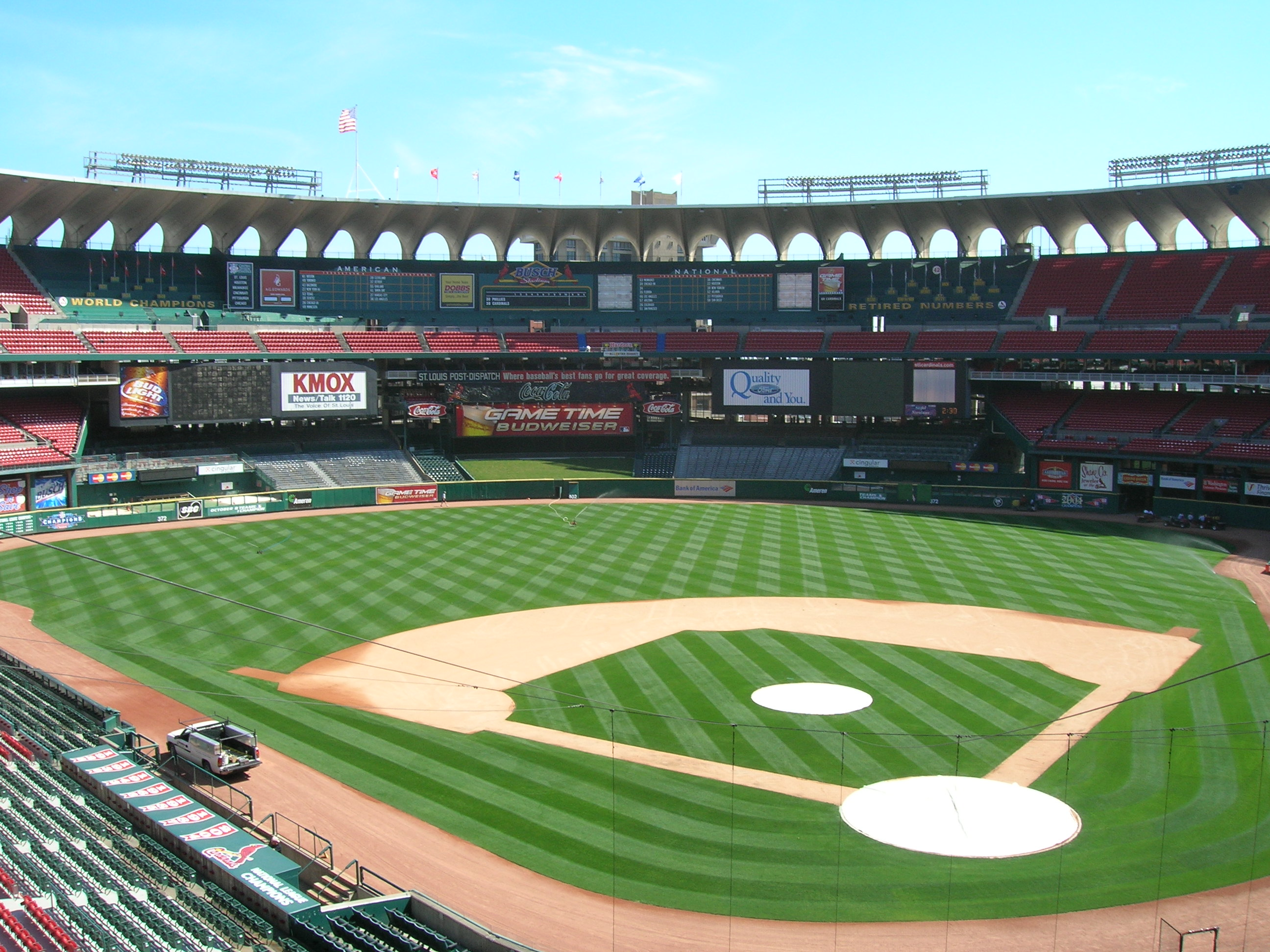
Busch Stadium (1966), the home of the St. Louis Cardinals baseball team from 1966 to 2005 and the St. Louis Cardinals football team from 1966 to 1987

- Radio City Music Hall and the Center Theater, in Rockefeller Center, New York City (as senior designer in the employ of the Rockefeller Center Associated Architects with Donald Deskey and Eugene Schoen, interior designers, 1932)
- Richard H. Mandel House, Bedford Hills, New York (with Donald Deskey, interior designer, 1933)
- Mepkin Plantation for Mr. and Mrs. Henry R. Luce, (now known as Mepkin Abbey), Monck's Corner, South Carolina (1936)
- Museum of Modern Art, New York City, (Philip L. Goodwin, associate architect, 1937)
- A. Conger Goodyear House, Old Westbury, New York (1938)
- Ingersoll Steel, Utility Unit House, Kalamazoo, Michigan (1946)
- El Panama Hotel, Panama City, Panama (Mendez and Sanders, associated architects, 1946)
- Fine Arts Center, University of Arkansas, Fayetteville, Arkansas (Haralson & Mott, associated architects, 1948)
- United States Embassy, New Delhi, India (1954)
- Phoenicia InterContinental Hotel first phase, Beirut, Lebanon (Elias and Dagher, associated architects, 1954. Second phase by Joseph Philippe Karam, then altered 1997)
- Stanford Medical Center, Palo Alto, California (1955)
- Bruno & Josephine Graf Residence, Dallas, Texas (1956)
- Main Library and Mitchell Park Branch Library, Palo Alto, California (1956, Mitchell Park Branch demolished 2010)
- Edward Durell Stone Townhouse, 130 East 64th Street, New York City (1956)
- Stuart Pharmaceutical Co., Pasadena, California (1956, partially demolished)
- U.S. Pavilion at Expo 58, Brussels, Belgium (1957, partially demolished)
- First Unitarian Society Church, Schenectady, New York (1958)
- Gallery of Modern Art, including the Huntington Hartford Collection (now known as Museum of Arts & Design), New York City (1958, substantially altered 2006)
- International Trade Mart (now known as Four Seasons Hotel and Private Residences New Orleans), New Orleans, Louisiana (Robert Hall, associate architect, 1959)
- Robert M. Hughes Memorial Library, Norfolk, Virginia (1959, substantially altered 2011)
- Harvey Mudd College, Claremont, California (1959)
- Thomas Cooper Library, University of South Carolina-Columbia, Columbia, SC (1959)
- North Carolina State Legislative Building, Raleigh, North Carolina (Holloway-Reeves & Associates, associated architects, 1960)
- Beckman Auditorium, California Institute of Technology, Pasadena, California (1960)
- National Geographic Society Museum, Washington, D.C. (1961)
- Museo de Arte, Ponce, Puerto Rico (1961)
- Windham College (now known as Landmark College), Putney, Vermont (1961)
- State University of New York at Albany, Albany, New York (1962)
- John F. Kennedy Center for the Performing Arts, Washington, D.C. (1962)
- Prince George's Center (now known as University Town Center), Hyattsville, Maryland (1962)
- Busch Memorial Stadium, St. Louis, Missouri (1962, demolished 2005)
- WAPDA House, Lahore, Pakistan (1962)
- Stuhr Museum of the Prairie Pioneer, Grand Island, Nebraska (1963)
- Claremont School of Theology, Claremont, California (1963)
- P.S. 199 School, Lincoln Square/Upper West Side, New York (1963)
- Davenport Public Library, Davenport, Iowa (1964)
- General Motors Building, New York City (Emory Roth and Sons, associated architects, 1964)
- Ethel Percy Andrus Gerontology Center, University of Southern California, Los Angeles, California (1964)
- Tulsa Convention Center, Tulsa, Oklahoma (Murray, Jones and Murray, associated architects, 1964, expanded and renamed to Cox Business Center)
- Von KleinSmid Center (now known as Dr. Joseph Medicine Crow Center for International and Public Affairs), University of Southern California, Los Angeles, California (1964,)
- Garden State Arts Center (now known as PNC Bank Arts Center), Holmdel, New Jersey (1965)
- Pakistan Institute of Nuclear Science and Technology, (1965)
- Georgetown University Law Center Bernard P. McDonough Hall, Washington, D.C. (1966)
- Westgate Tower, Austin, Texas (1966)
- Brith Emeth Temple, Pepper Pike, Ohio (1967)
- Fort Worth City Hall, Fort Worth, Texas (1967)
- Kirwan-Blanding Complex, University of Kentucky, Lexington, Kentucky (1967; demolished 2020)
- PepsiCo World Headquarters Complex, Purchase, New York (1967)
- Jefferson County Civic Center, Pine Bluff, Arkansas (1968)
- Place Bell, Ottawa (1969)
- Worcester Science Museum (now known as the EcoTarium), Worcester, Massachusetts, (1964, altered 1998)
- Aiwan-e-Sadr (1970), Islamabad
- Wilshire Colonnade, Los Angeles, California (1970)
- Eisenhower Medical Center, Rancho Mirage, California (1971)
- W. E. B. Du Bois Library, University of Massachusetts Amherst, Amherst, Massachusetts (1971)
- Amarillo Museum of Art, Amarillo, Texas (1972)
- Standard Oil Building (now known as Aon Center), Chicago, Illinois (Perkins & Will, associated architects, 1972)
- Buffalo News Building, Buffalo, New York (1973)
- Scripps Green Hospital, La Jolla, California (1974)
- First Bank Tower (now known as First Canadian Place), Toronto, Ontario (1975)
- Babin Kuk Resort, Dubrovnik, Croatia (1976)
- Florida State Capitol, Tallahassee, Florida (Reynolds, Smith & Hills, associated architects, 1977)
- University of Alabama School of Law, Tuscaloosa, Alabama (1977)
- Scripps Anderson Outpatient Pavilion, La Jolla, California (by Edward Durell Stone Associates, 1983)
- Government Center Station, Miami, Florida (1984)
- Scripps Research Institute, La Jolla, California (by Edward Durell Stone Associates, 1985)
- Museum of Anthropology, Xalapa, Veracruz, Mexico (by Edward Durell Stone Associates, 1986)

== Gallery ==
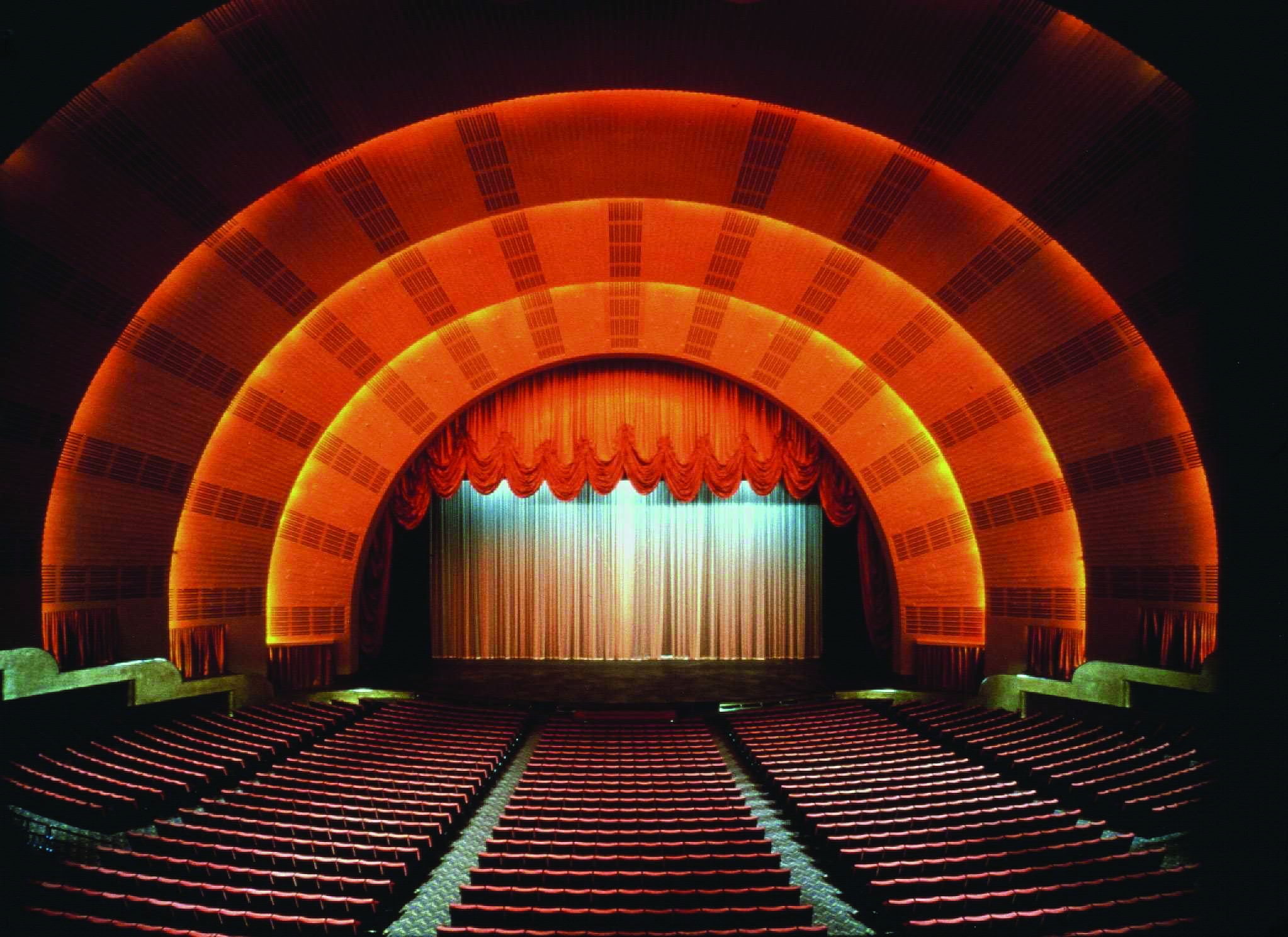
Radio City Music Hall, New York City (1932)

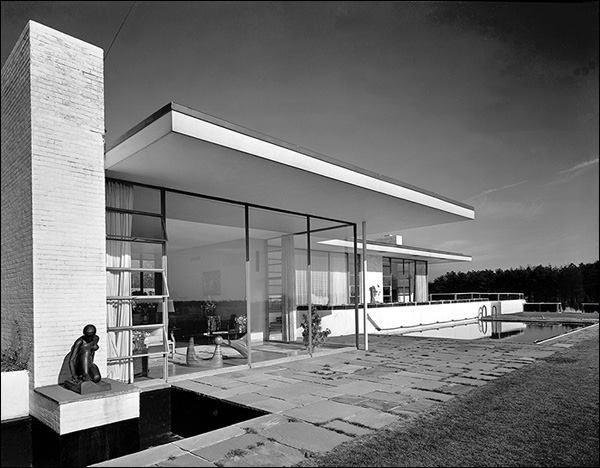
Anson Conger Goodyear House, Old Westbury, New York (1938)

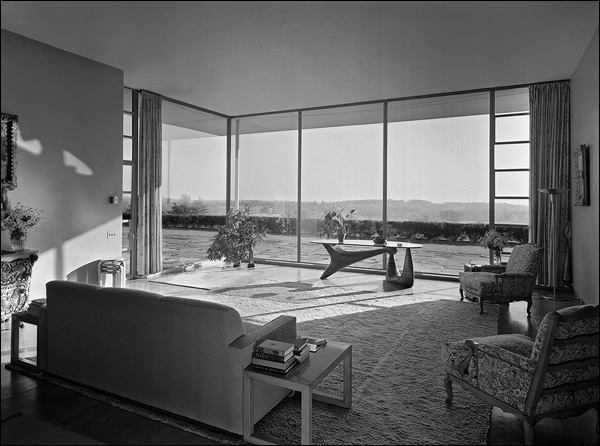
Anson Conger Goodyear House, Old Westbury, New York (1938)

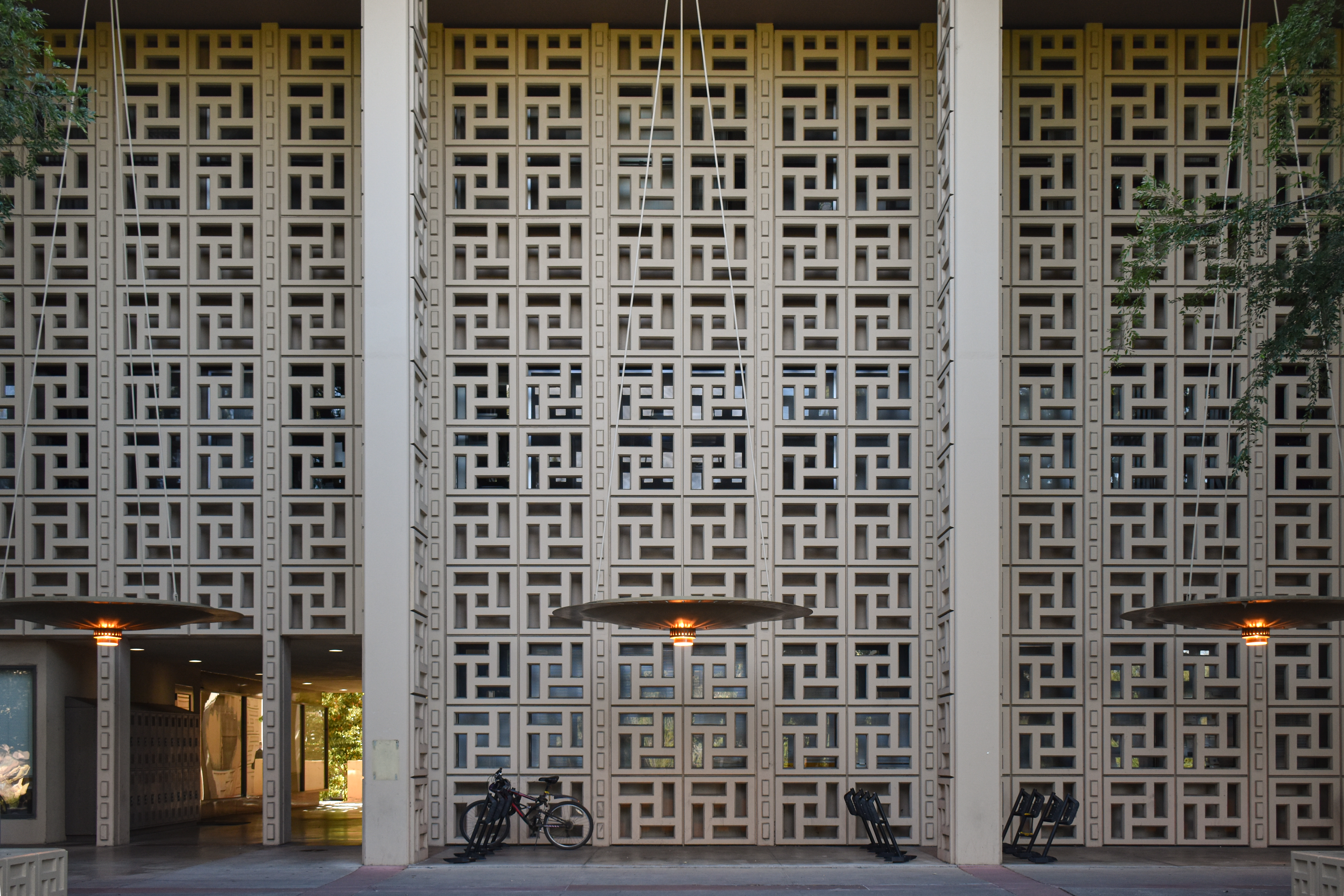
Stanford U. Medical Center, Palo Alto, California (1955)

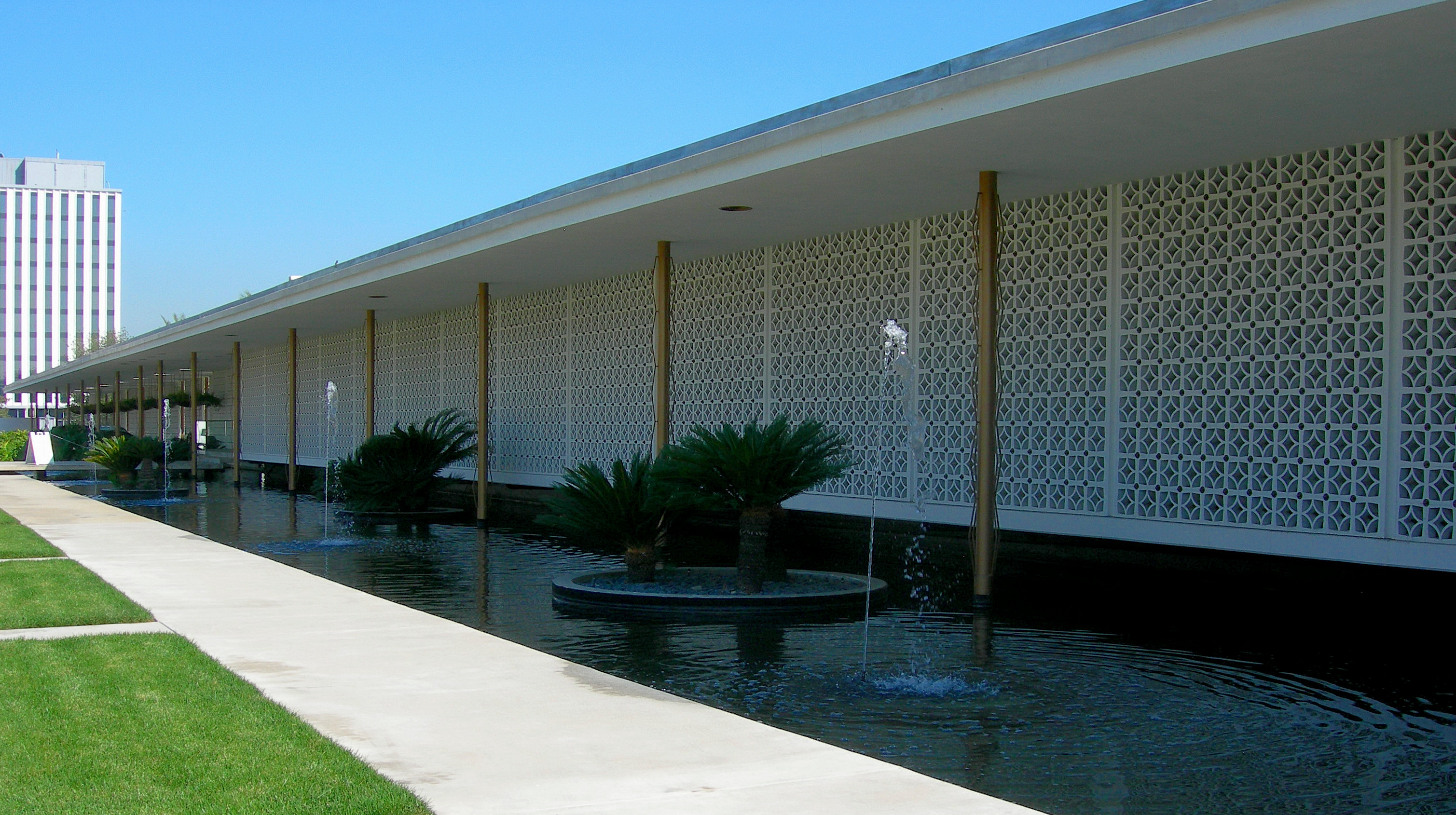
Stuart Pharmaceutical Co., Pasadena, California (1956)

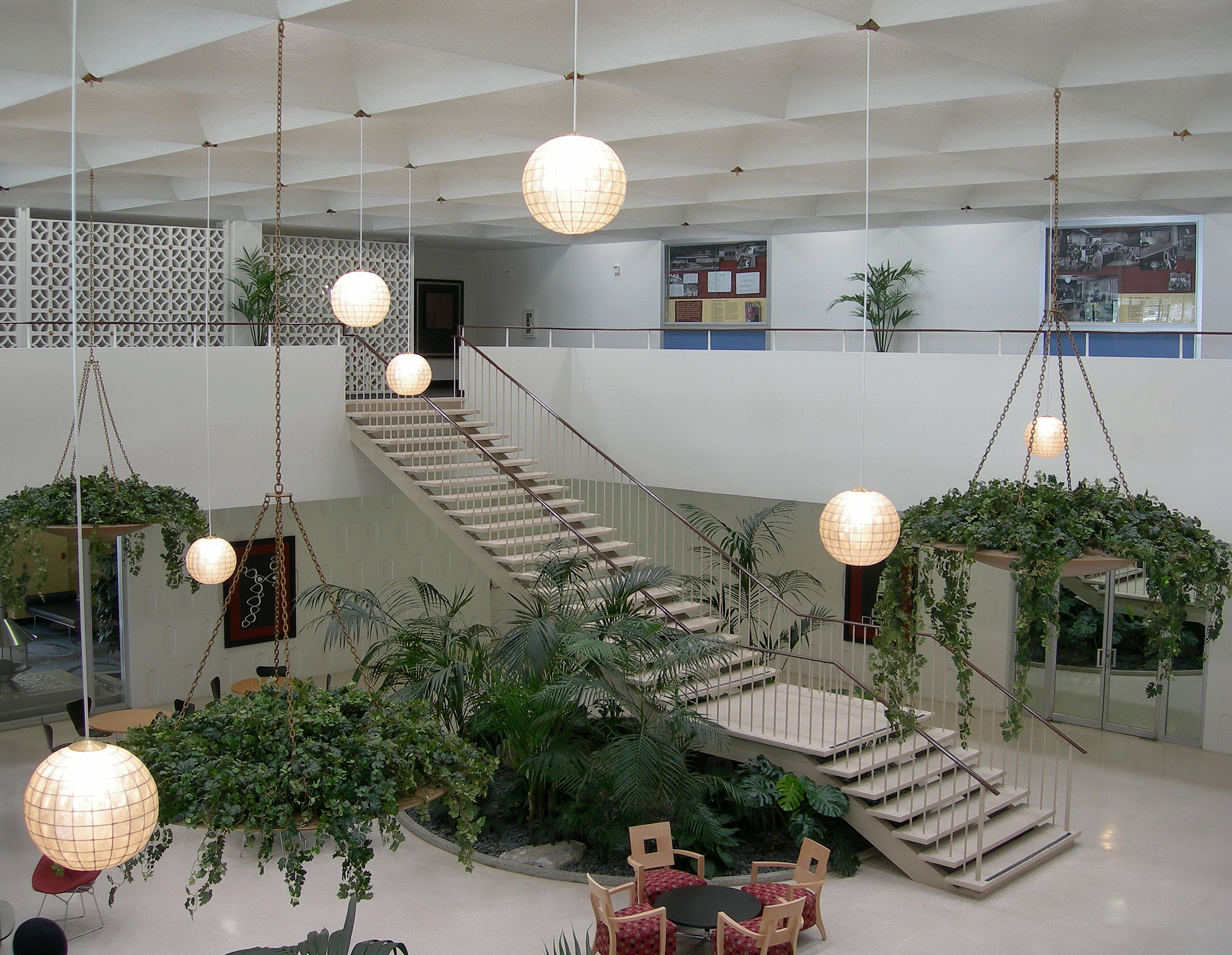
Stuart Pharmaceutical Co., Pasadena, California (1956)

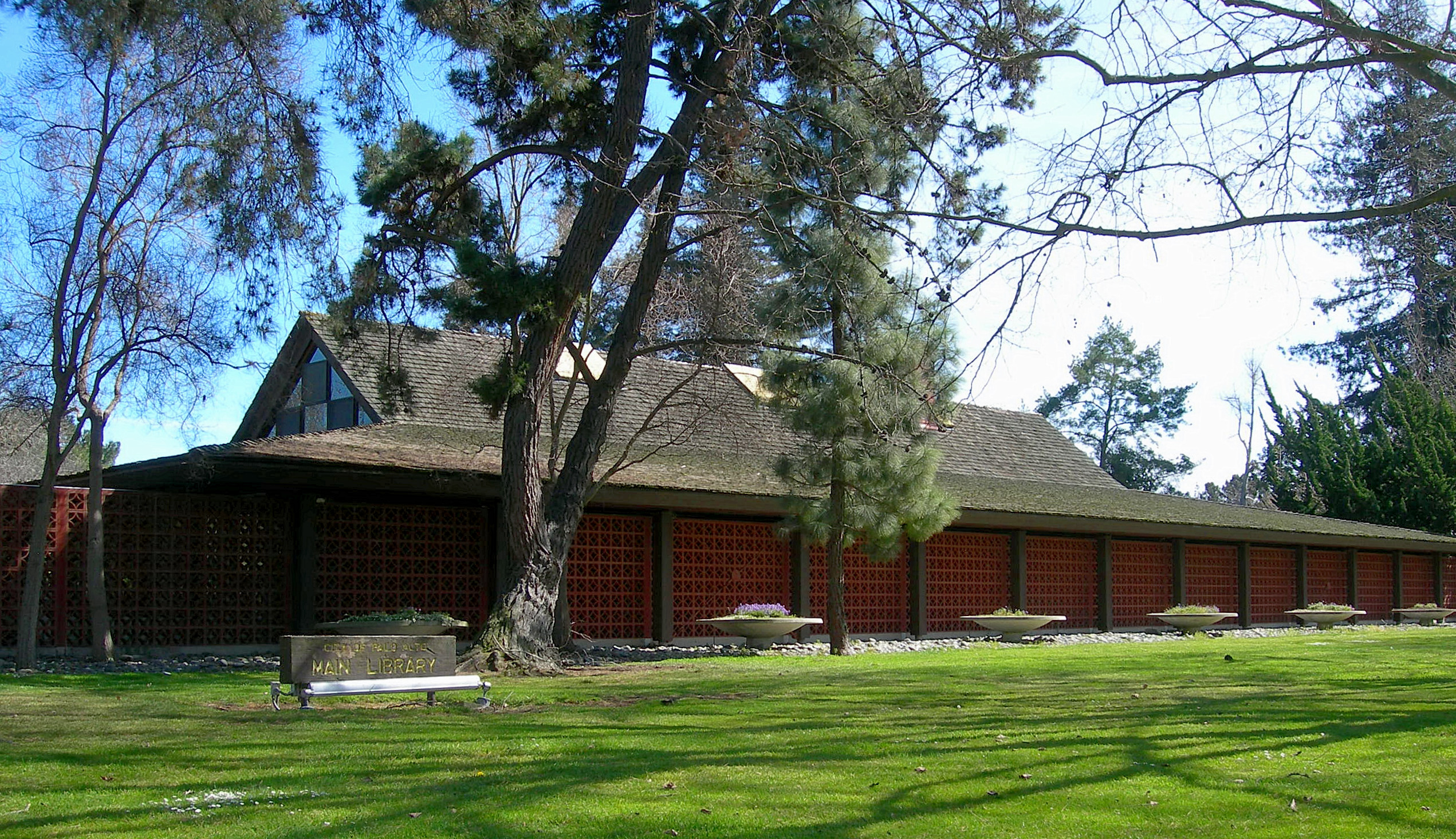
Palo Alto Main Library, Palo Alto, California (1956)

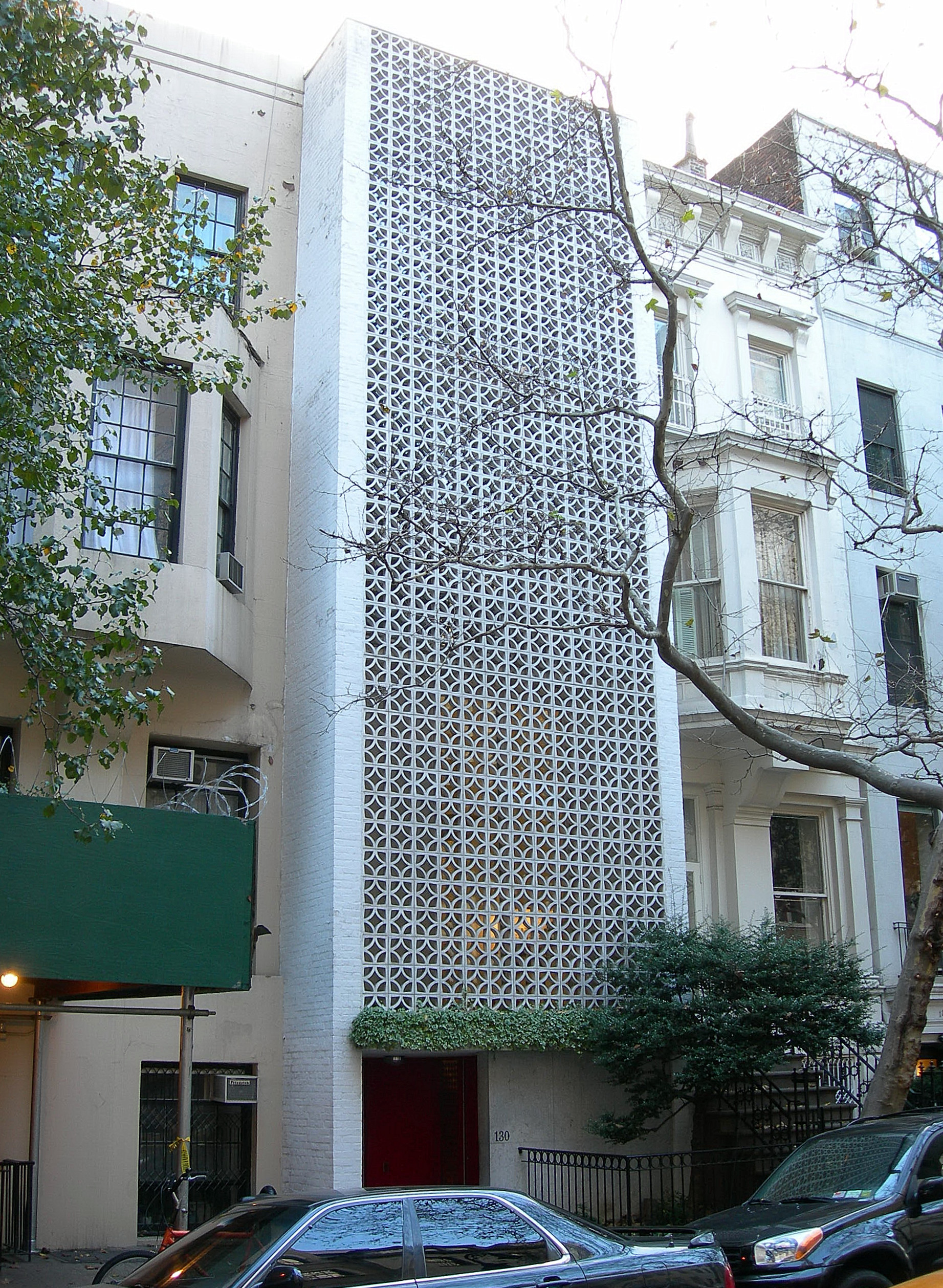
Edward Durell Stone Townhouse, New York City (1956)

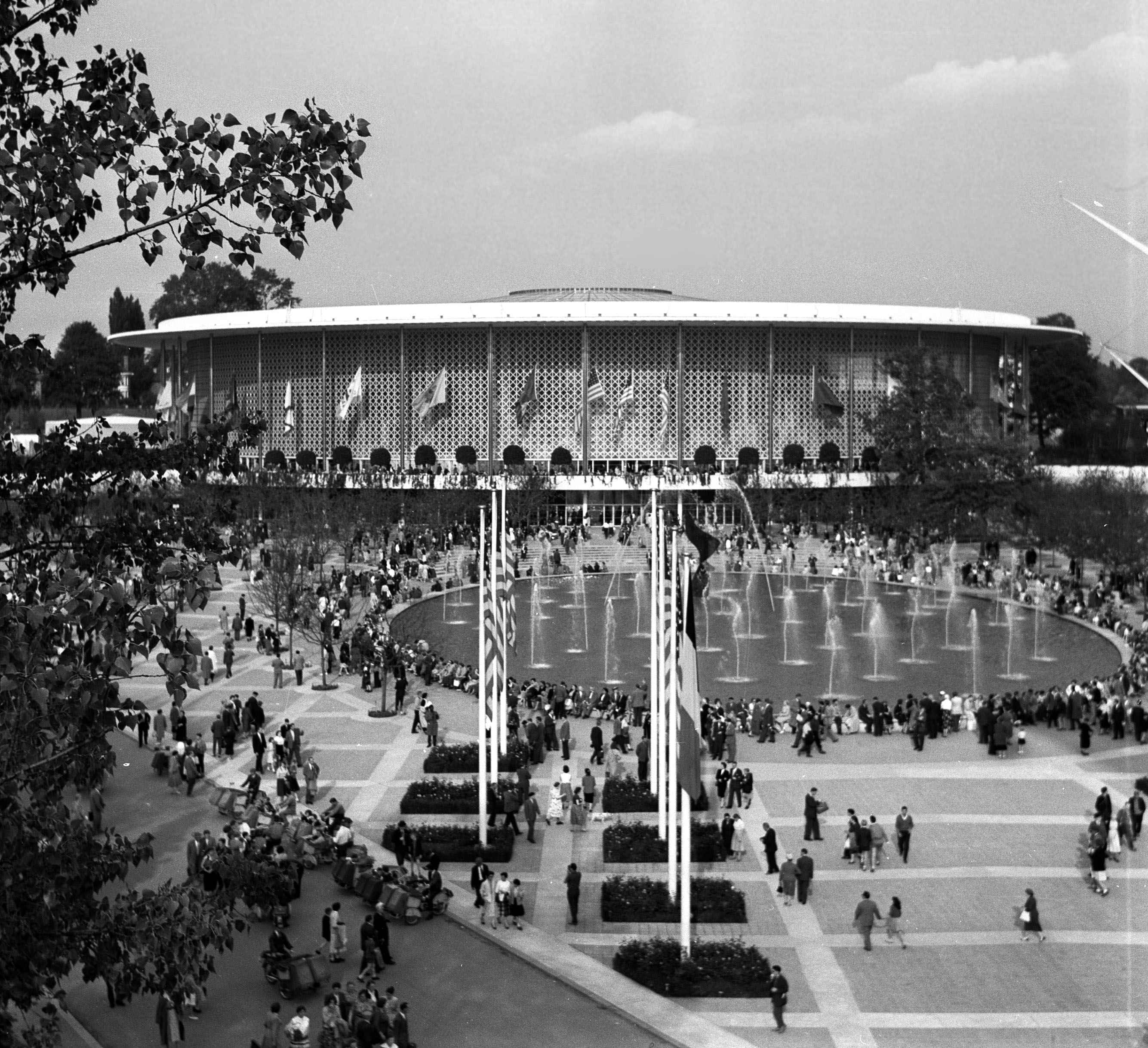
United States Pavilion, Expo 1958, Brussels, Belgium (1957)

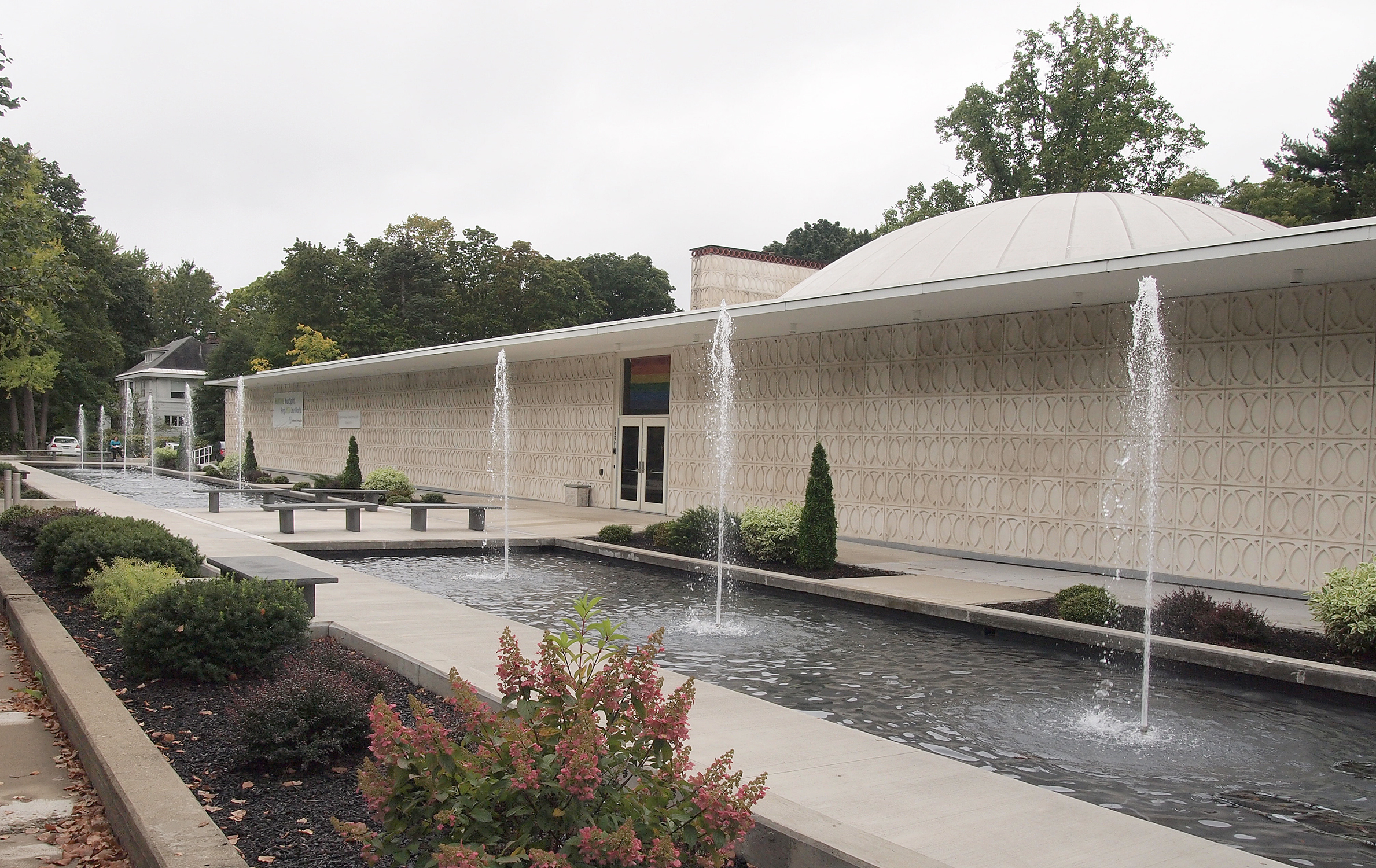
First Unitarian Society, Schenectady, New York (1958)

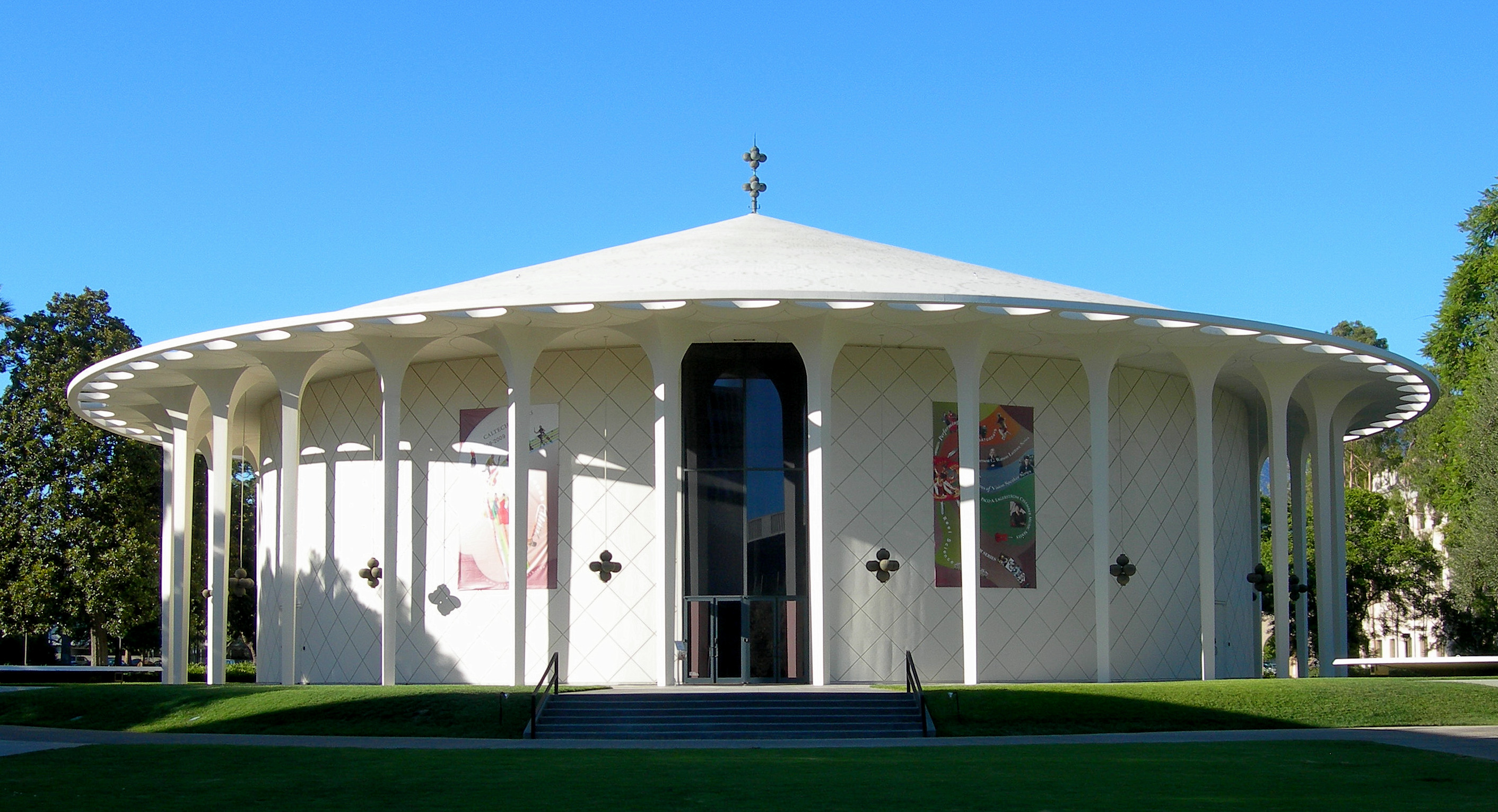
Beckman Auditorium, California Institute of Technology, Pasadena, California (1960)

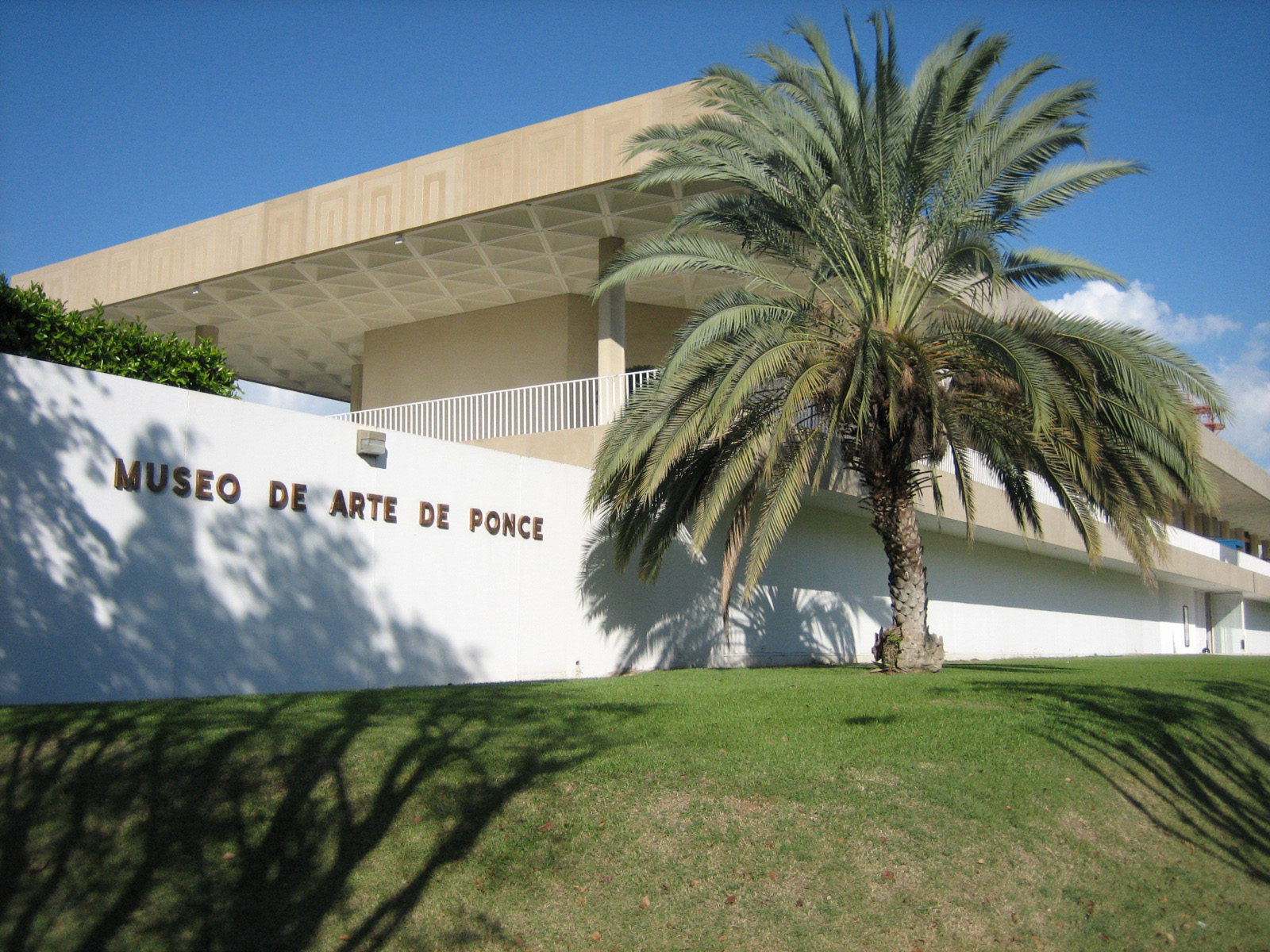
Museo de Arte, Ponce, Puerto Rico (1961)

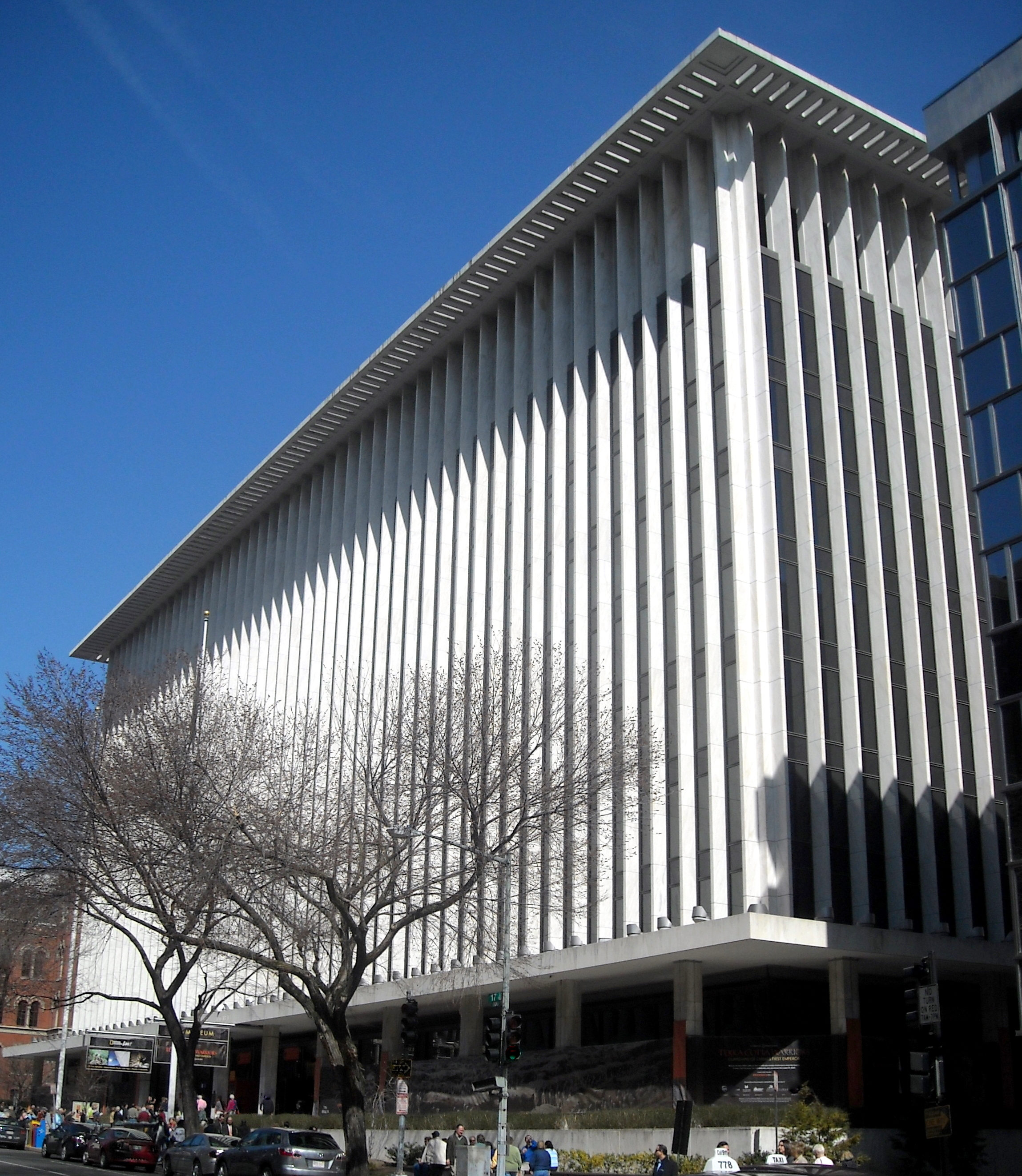
National Geographic Society Headquarters, Washington, D.C. (1961)

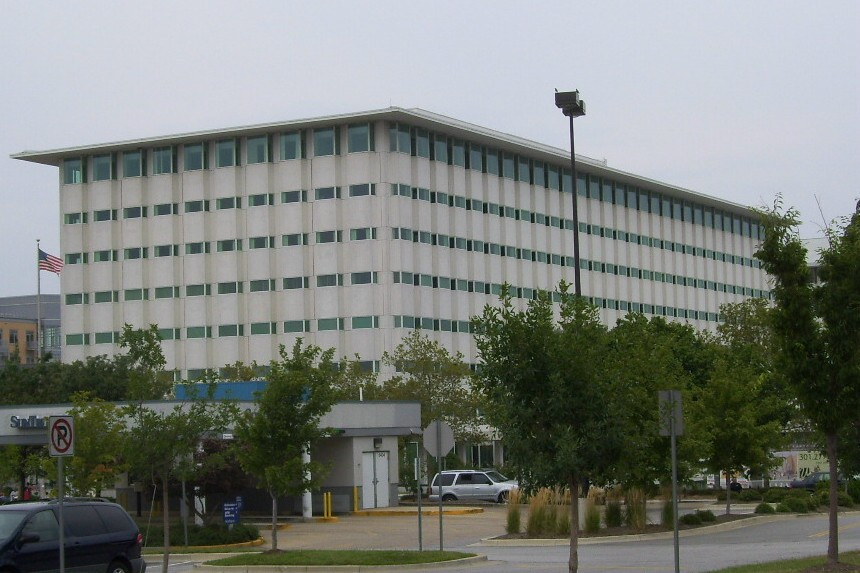
Metro One Building, University Town Center, Hyattsville, Maryland (1962)

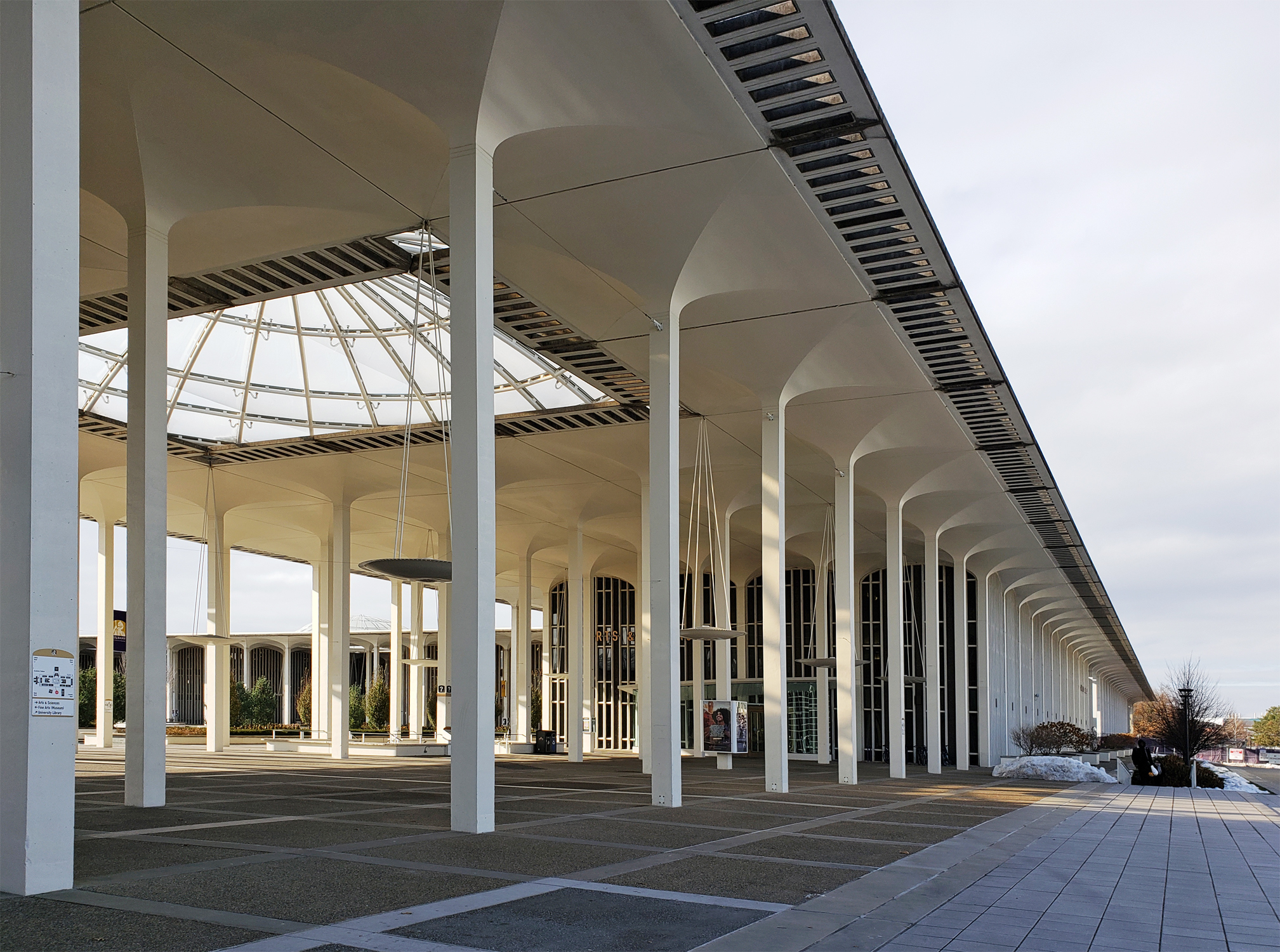
Main academic podium, University at Albany, Albany, New York (1962)

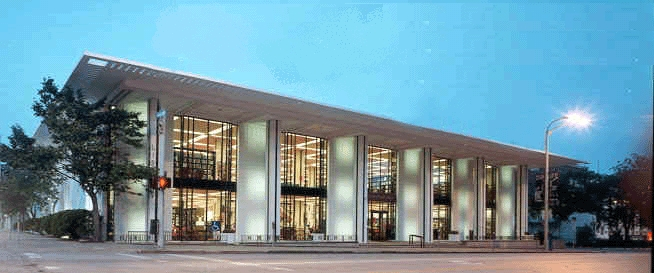
Davenport Public Library, Davenport, Iowa (1964)

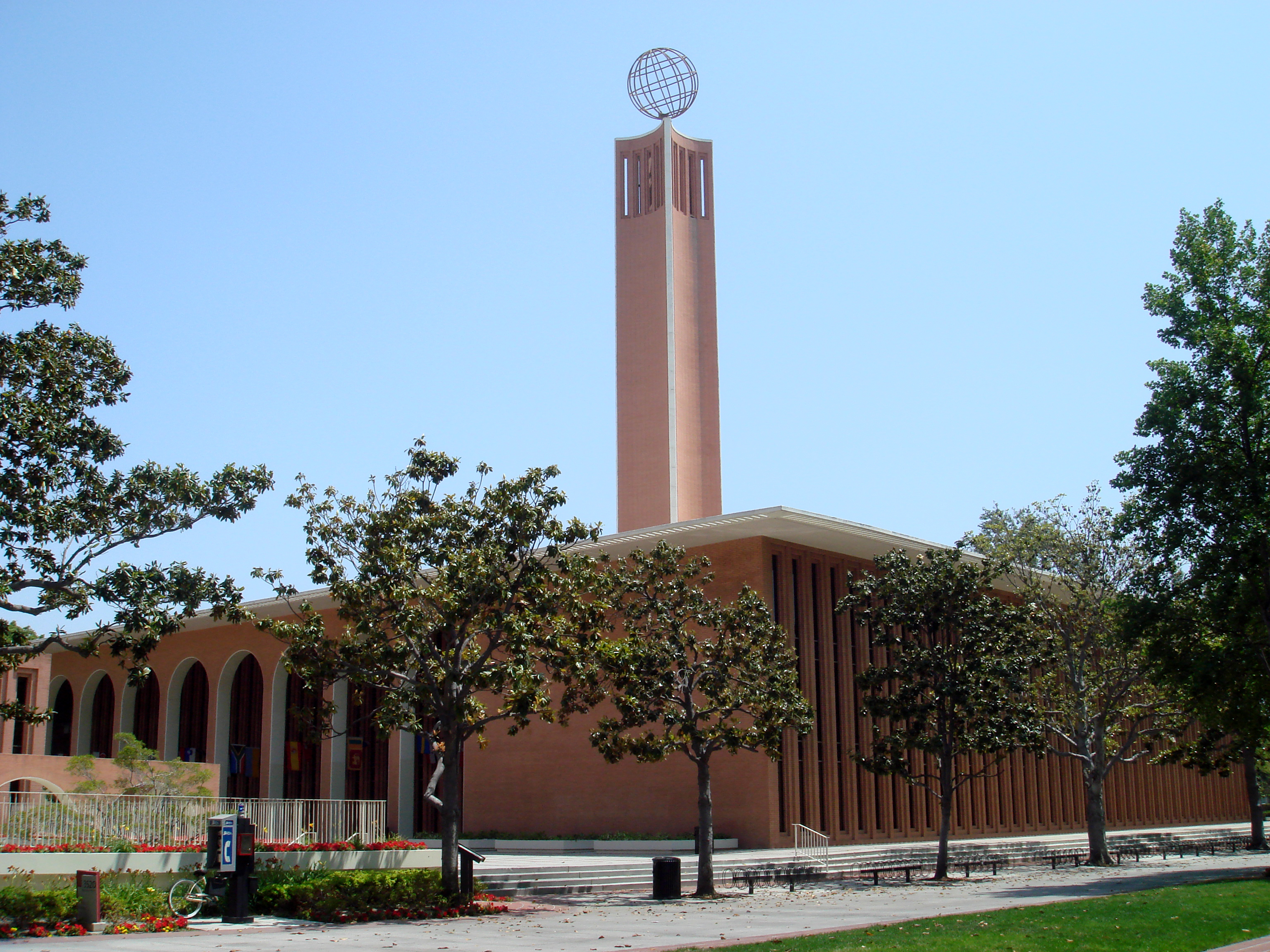
Joe Medicine Crow Center, University of Southern California, Los Angeles, California (1964)

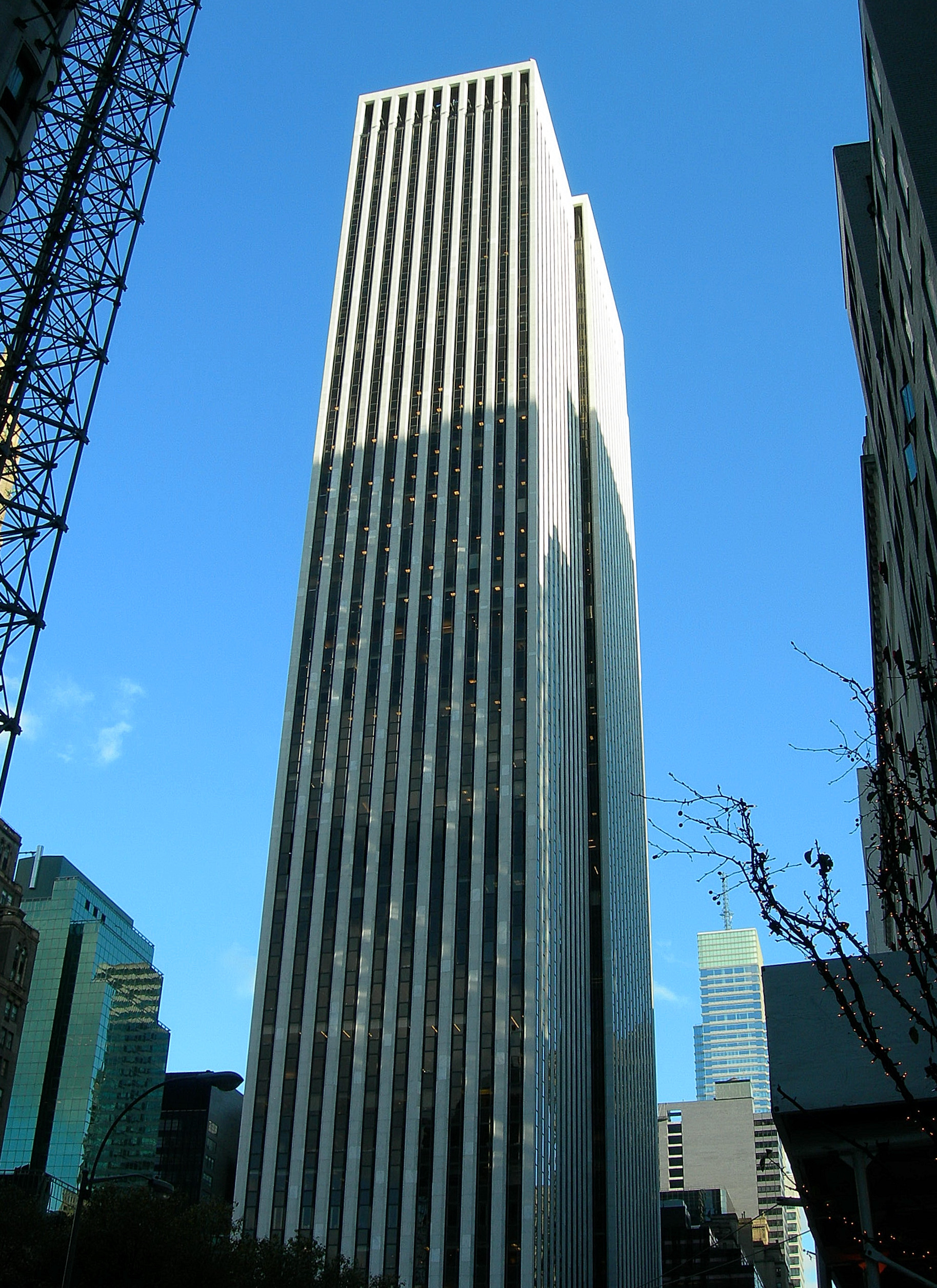
General Motors Building, New York City (1964)

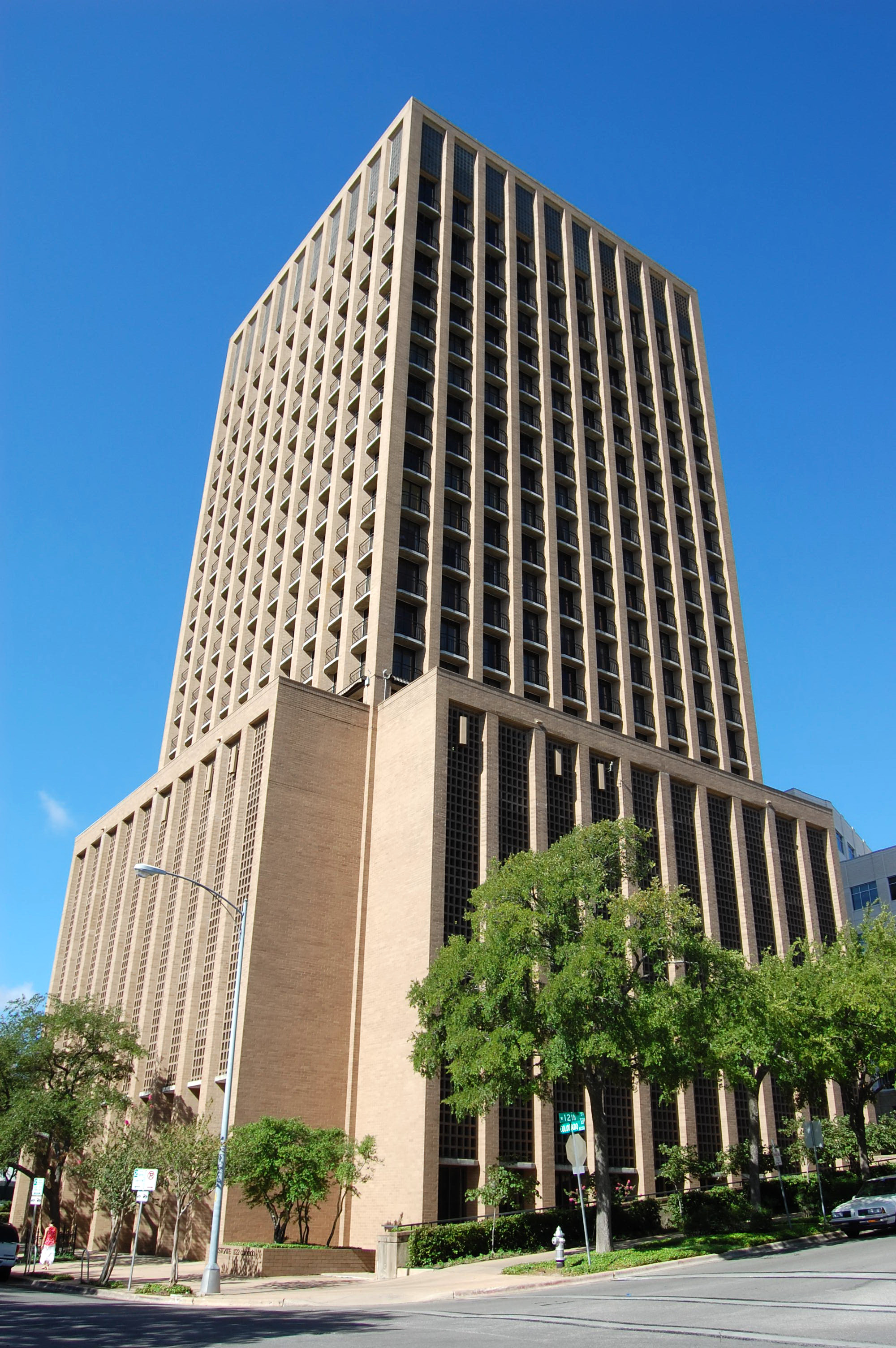
Westgate Tower, Austin, Texas (1966)

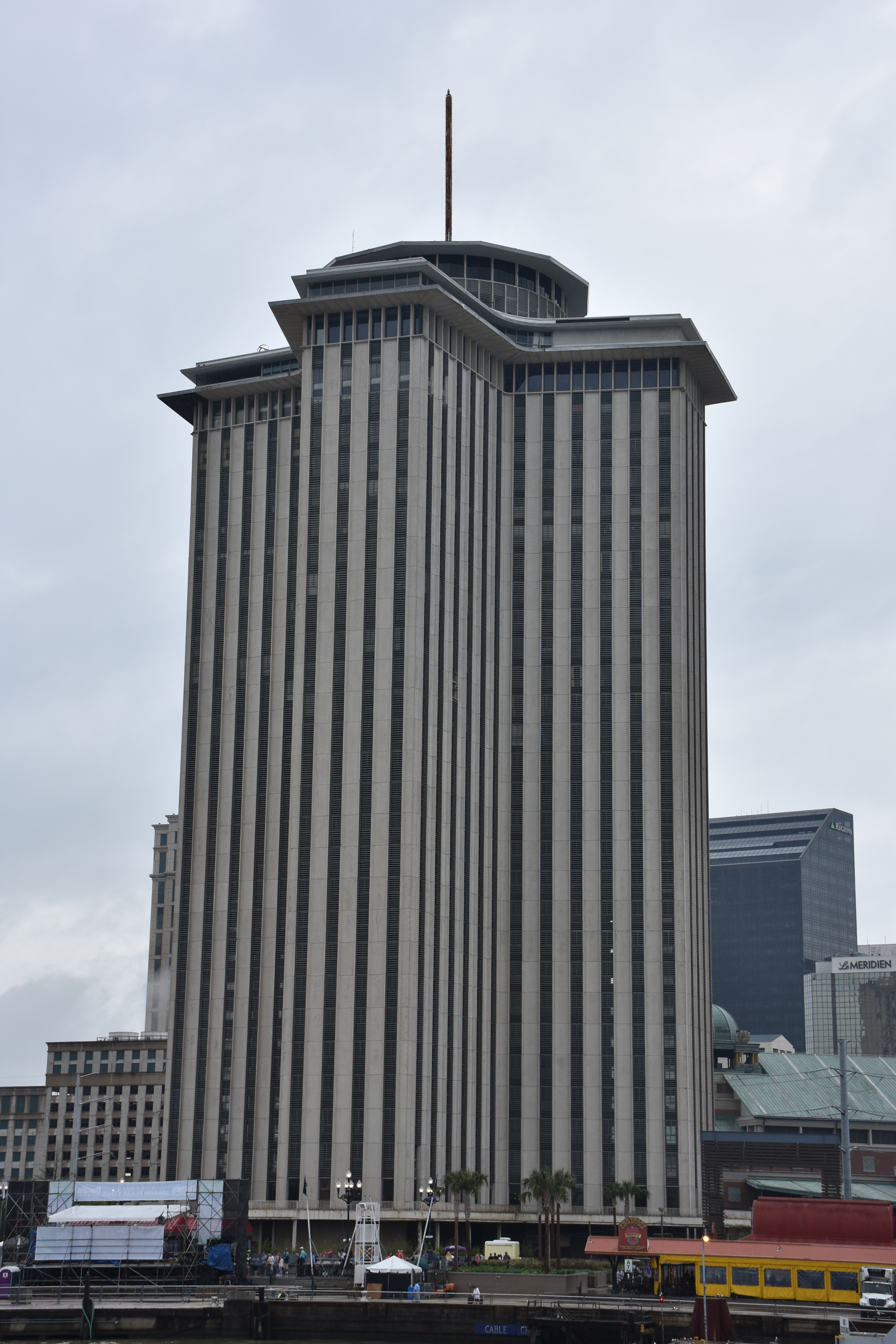
ITM Building, New Orleans, Louisiana (1967)

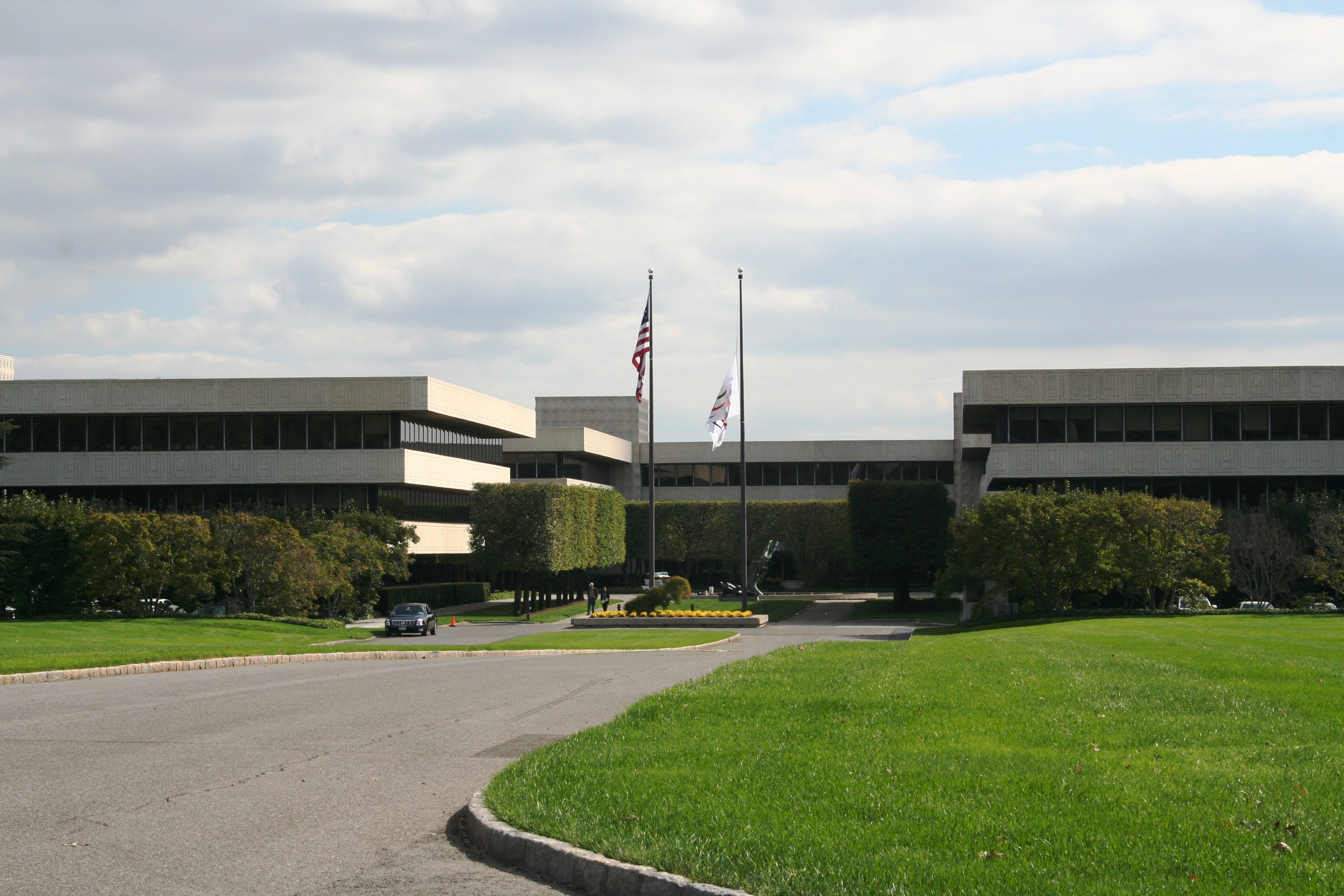
PepsiCo Headquarters, Purchase, New York (1967)

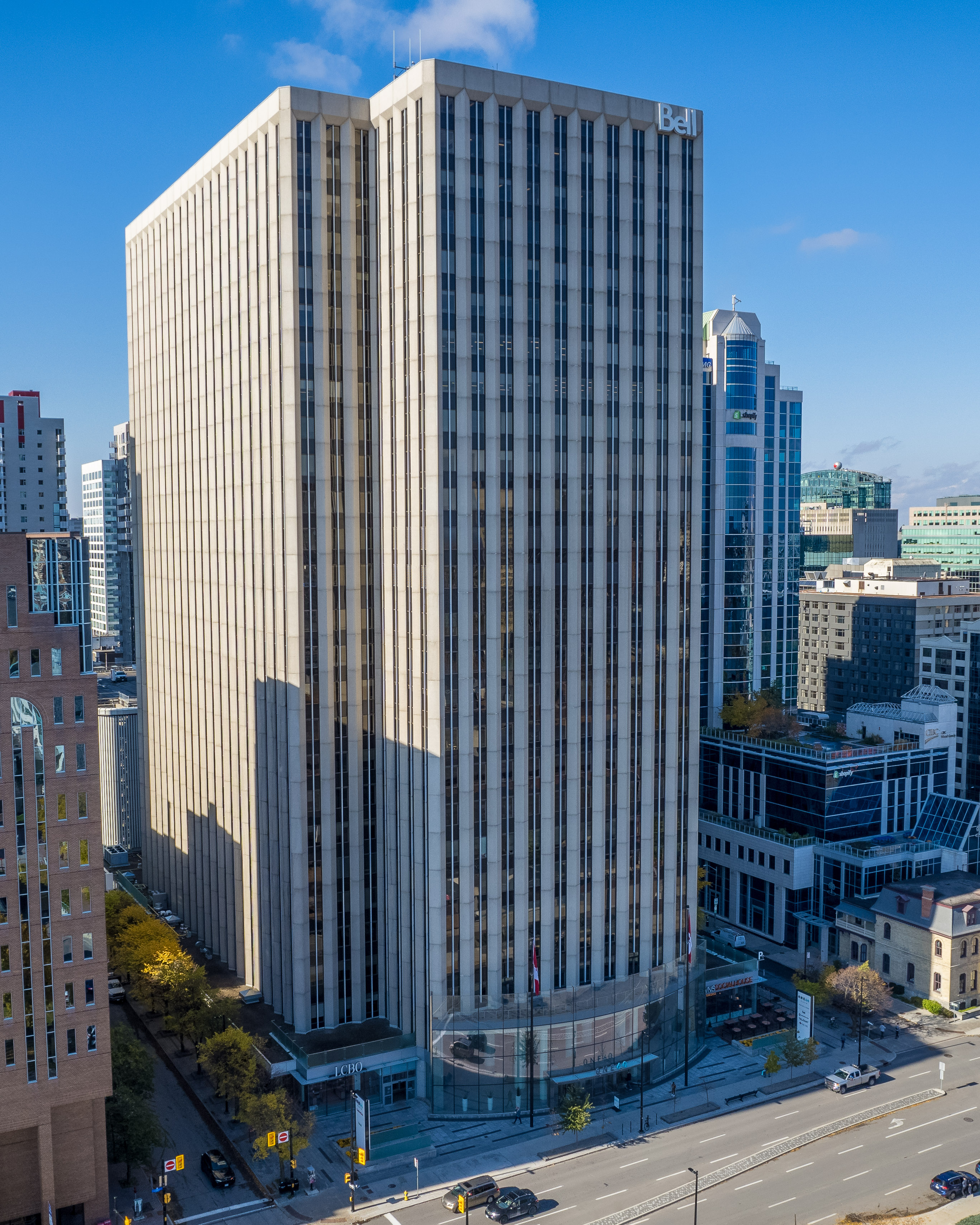
Place Bell, Ottawa (1969)

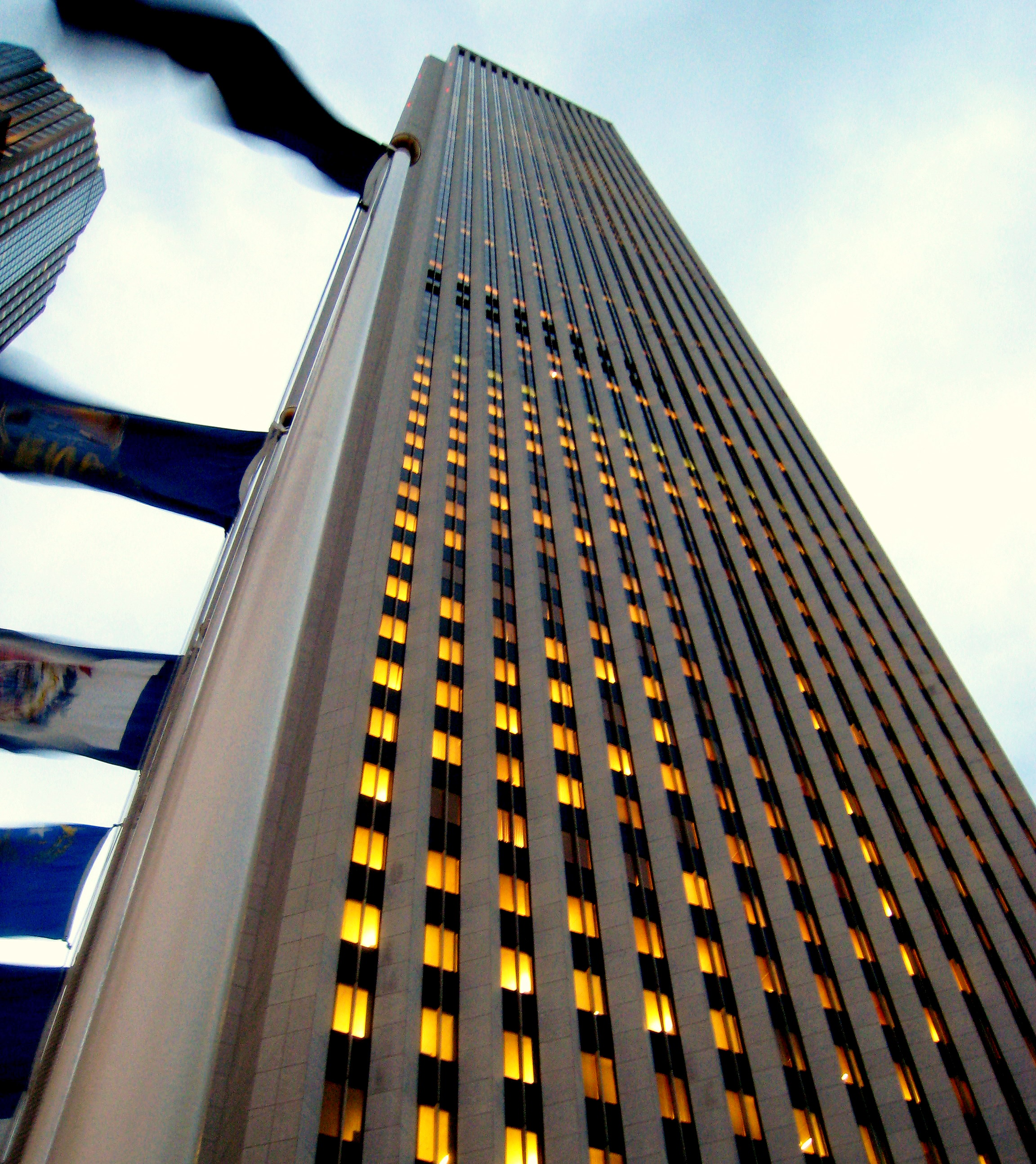
Aon Center, Chicago, Illinois (1972)

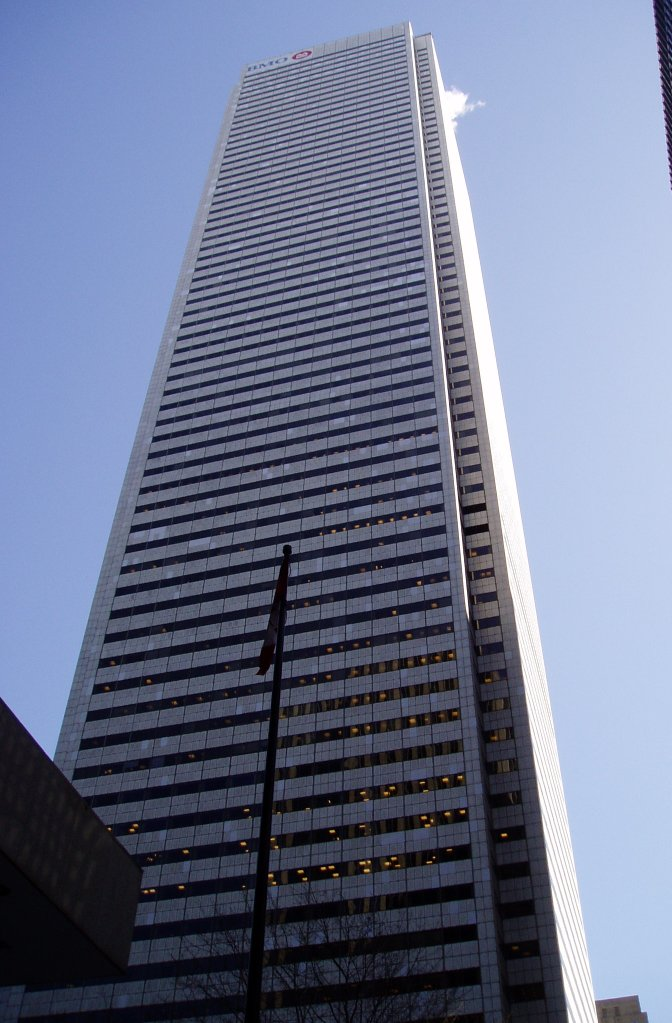
First Canadian Place, Toronto, Ontario, Canada (1975)

== Footnotes ==
=== Works cited ===
- Stone, Edward Durell (1962). The Evolution of an Architect. Horizon Press. OCLC 929669.
- Stone, Hicks (2011). Edward Durell Stone: A Son's Untold Story of a Legendary Architect. Random House Incorporated. ISBN 978-0-8478-3568-3.
- von Eckardt, Wolf (1961). Mid-century Architecture in America: Honor Awards of the American Institute of Architects, 1949-1961. Baltimore: Johns Hopkins Press.
- Hunting, Mary Anne (2013). Edward Durell Stone: Modernism's Populist Architect. W.W. Norton. ISBN 978-0-393-73301-3.
- Williams, John Griffith (1984). The curious and the beautiful: a memoir history of the architecture program at the University of Arkansas. University of Arkansas Press. ISBN 9780938626329.
- Stone, Edward Durell (1967). Edward Durell Stone: Recent and Future Architecture. New York: Horizon Press.

=== General references ===
- Everett, Derek R. "Modern Statehouses for Modern States: Edward Durell Stone's Capitol Architecture in North Carolina and Florida." Southern Historian, Vol. 28 (Spring 2007): pp. 74–91.
- Head, Jeffrey. "Unearthing Stone." Metropolis magazine, Urban Journal, January 2008.
- Heyer, Paul. Architects on Architecture: New Directions in America. (New York: Walker & Co., 1966): pp. 172–183.
- Hunting, Mary Anne. "Edward Durell Stone, Perception and Criticism." (PhD diss., Graduate Center, City University of New York, 2007).
- Hunting, Mary Anne. “Edward Durell Stone.” In Oxford Bibliographies in Architecture, Planning, and Preservation. New York: Oxford University Press, forthcoming.
- Hunting, Mary Anne. "From Craft to Industry: Furniture designed by Edward Durell Stone for Senator Fulbright." The Magazine Antiques (May 2004): 110–121.
- Hunting, Mary Anne. “Legacy of Stone: As Campus Buildings Rise and Fall, A Leading Mid-20th-Century Architect's Vision Endures,” Vanderbilt Magazine (Summer 2014): *18–19, 78–79.
- Hunting, Mary Anne. "The Richard H. Mandel House in Bedford Hills, New York." Living with Antiques.The Magazine Antiques (July 2001): 72–83.
- Hunting, Mary Anne. "Rediscovering the Work of Edward Durell Stone". Modern Magazine (Spring 2013): 70 and 72.
- Ricciotti, Dominic. "Edward Durell Stone and the International Style in America: Houses of the 1930s." American Art Journal, Vol. 20, No. 3 (Summer 1988): pp. 48–73.
- Ricciotti, Dominic. "The 1939 Building of the Museum of Modern Art: The Goodwin-Stone Collaboration." American Art Journal, Vol. 17, No. 3 (Summer 1985): pp. 51–76.
