= A. Conger Goodyear House =

Historic house in New York, United States

- U.S. National Register of Historic Places
- New York State Register of Historic Places
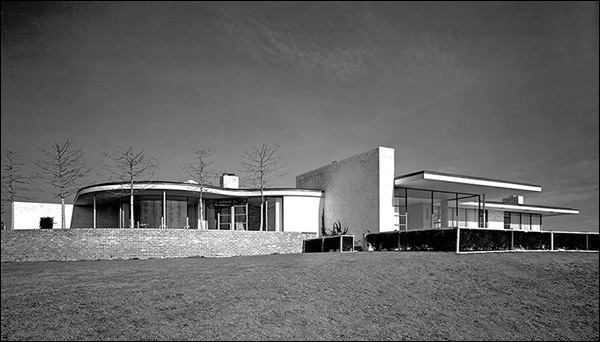
- A historic image of the A. Conger Goodyear House

- Location within New York Location within the United States
- Location: 14 Orchard Ln., Old Westbury, New York
- Coordinates: 40°48′3.826″N 73°35′24″W
- Area: 5.5 acres (2.2 ha)
- Built: 1938
- Architect: Edward Durell Stone
- Architectural style: International Style
- NRHP reference No.: 03001246

Significant dates
- Added to NRHP: December 4, 2003
- Designated NYSRHP: October 3, 2003

The A. Conger Goodyear House is a historic home located in the Village of Old Westbury in Nassau County, New York, United States.

== History ==
The house was built in 1938 in the International style. The house was designed by architect Edward Durell Stone, and was owned by businessman and philanthropist Anson Conger Goodyear. The house has 6,000 square feet (560 m^{2}) of space, five bedrooms and five and a half baths and currently sits on a five-and-a-half-acre lot.

The home has been described as "a remarkable balancing act between the austerity of the then·developing high modernism of Mies van der Rohe and the warm, site-oriented romantic functionalism of earlier American masters like Frank Lloyd Wright."

When Goodyear died in 1964, the home was left unoccupied until 1970, when the family donated the house to the New York Institute of Technology (NYIT) for use as the president's house. In 1997, NYIT sold it to Wheatley Construction Company, which had planned to raze it for new development. The World Monuments Fund campaigned to save it, starting in 2001, and eventually bought it in 2005. Later that year, the fund sold it to the Modernist design dealer Troy Halterman with constrictive limitations on renovations to the interior and exterior, though the lot was reduced from 100 acres. Halterman never moved in, and sold the house in 2007 to Eric Cohler, an interior designer who spent a purported US$2 million in renovations. The home was sold to art and architecture collector Aby Rosen in 2011.

It was listed on the National Register of Historic Places and the New York State Register of Historic Places in 2003.

== Importance ==
In his 1962 memoir, The Evolution of an Architect, Edward Durell Stone wrote:

The site, a barren hilltop, demanded the low horizontal lines of a one-story house. Mr. Goodyear had a fine collection of modern paintings, and I decided to have a gallery serve as a "spinal column" from which all the rooms, with an expansive view to the south, opened, I employed glass walls from floor to ceiling, the ceilings continuing beyond the walls to form wide sheltering eaves. As the house faces south, the eaves were adjusted in depth so that the glass areas were shaded during the summer months, and when the sun was low during the winter months, its welcoming rays penetrated the house through the glass walls.

Of the house's eaves, he wrote:

Not only is the overhanging eave an important practical consideration, but I find it aesthetically mandatory on a house with a flat roof, satisfying visually the desire for certain aspects of the pitched roof so long associated with residential architecture.

Robert A.M. Stern, dean of the Yale School of Architecture, told The New York Times, "It's one of the few great International Style houses by an American architect of the 1930s. It's a great country house as well and surprisingly luxurious in a Busby Berkeley-meets-Bauhaus kind of way."

The New Yorker architecture critic, Paul Goldberger, called the Goodyear home "one of the most important houses built in the United States between the two world wars."

== Gallery ==
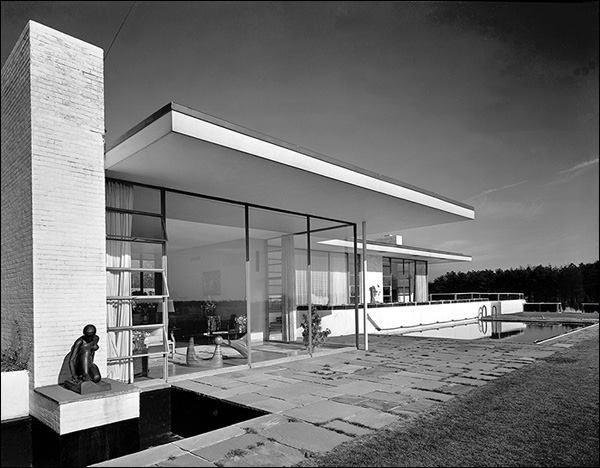
Exterior

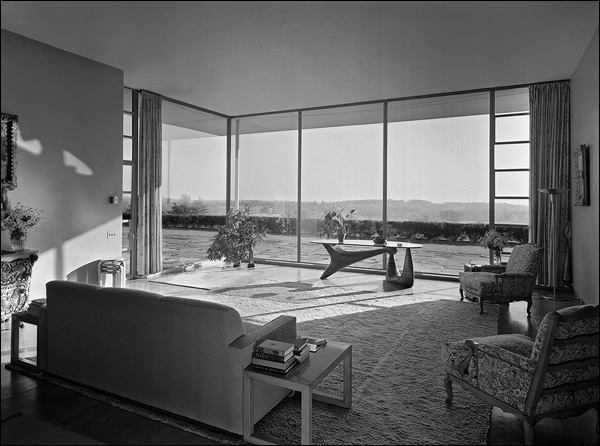
Interior

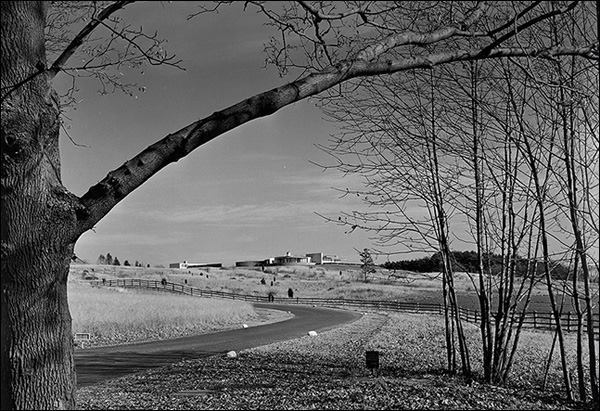
Approach

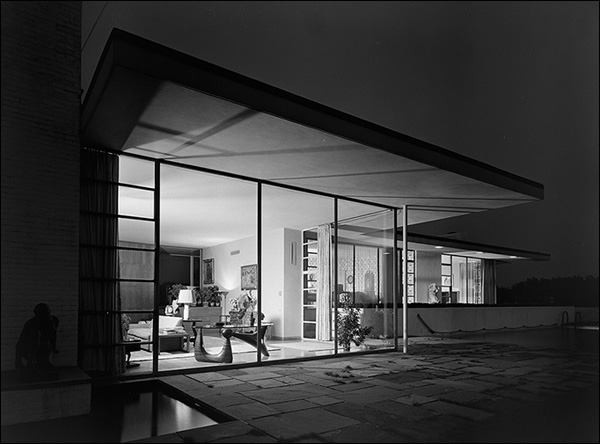
Exterior at night
