= Richard H. Mandel House =

Historic house in New York, United States

- U.S. National Register of Historic Places
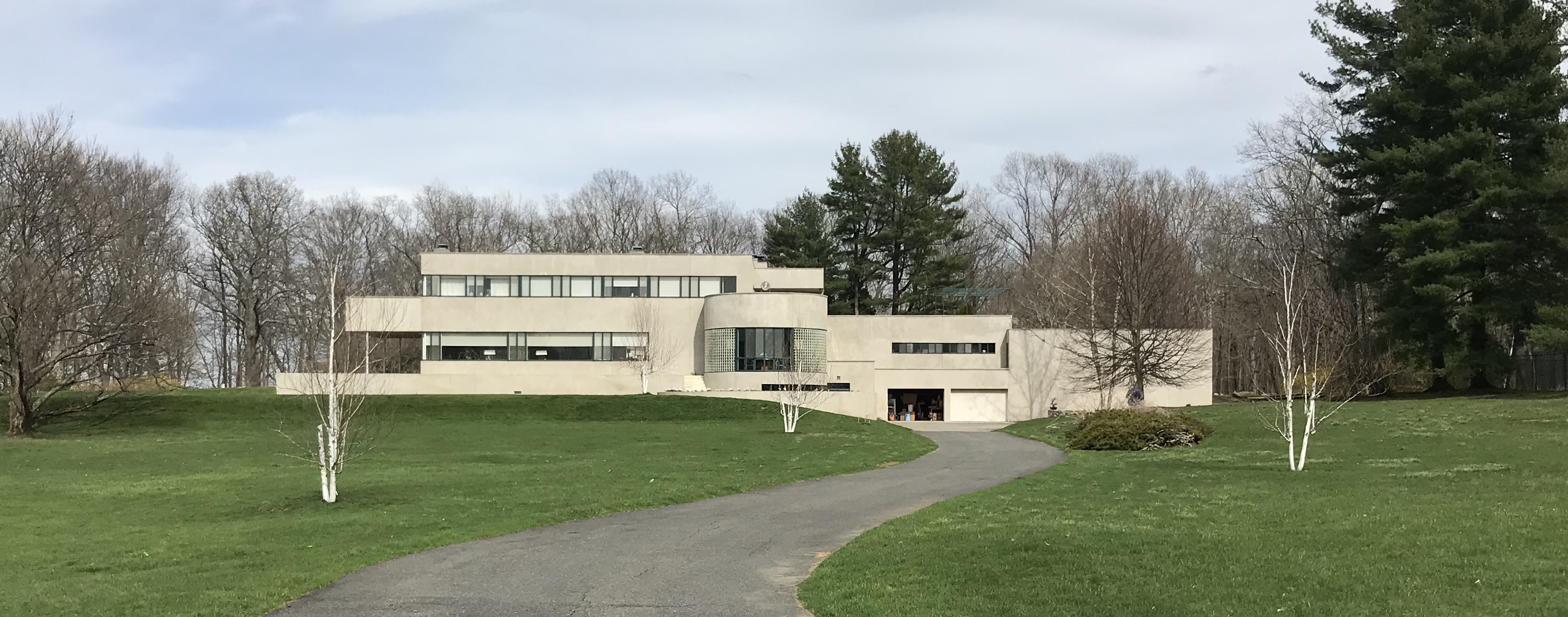

- Location within New York Location within the United States
- Location: 323 Haines Rd., Bedford Hills, New York
- Coordinates: 41°14′40″N 73°43′33″W
- Area: 16.9 acres (6.8 ha)
- Built: 1935
- Architect: Stone, Edward Durell; Deskey, Donald
- Architectural style: International Style
- NRHP reference No.: 96000176
- Added to NRHP: March 1, 1996

The Richard H. Mandel House is a historic home located at Bedford Hills, Westchester County, New York. It was designed by architect Edward Durell Stone and built between 1933 and 1935 in the International style. It is a Z-shaped building sited overlooking the Croton Reservoir. It is a two-story, concrete block, steel frame, and stucco building with a partial basement recessed into the sloping site. Located on a lot of 21 acres, the house is almost 10,000 square feet with 7 bedrooms and 4.5 bathrooms. It features a flat roof, smooth and uniform wall surfaces, lack of applied ornament, asymmetrical composition with an emphasis on horizontality, and projecting balconies and wide expanses of ribbon windows. The interiors and furnishings for the home were designed by Donald Deskey. The original owner was Richard Mandel (1907–1976), a member of the Mandel Brothers department store family of Chicago.

It was added to the National Register of Historic Places in 1996.

== See also ==
- National Register of Historic Places listings in northern Westchester County, New York
