= Julie Strauss-Gabel =

American publisher and book editor (born 1972)

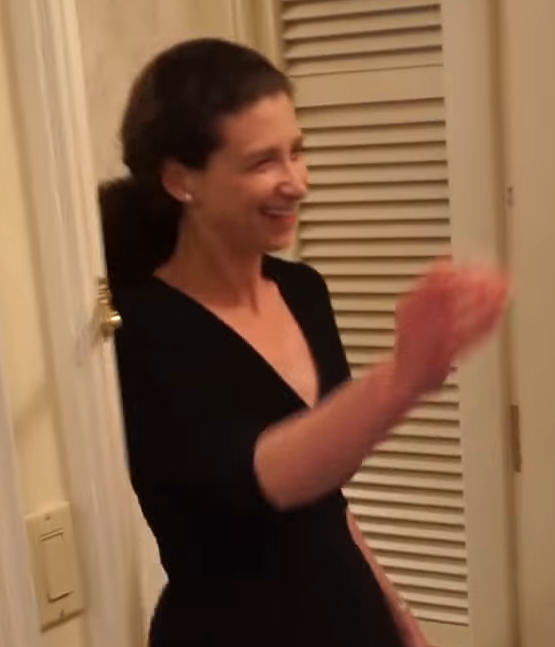
- Strauss-Gabel in 2016
- Born: 1972 (age 53–54)
- Education: Amherst College; Harvard Graduate School of Education
- Notable work: Will Grayson, Will Grayson (editor); The Fault in Our Stars (editor)
- Spouse: David Feldman

Julie Ellyn Strauss-Gabel (born 1972) is an American publisher and editor of books for young adults. She has gotten numerous titles on The New York Times Best Seller list.

== Early and personal life ==
Strauss-Gabel grew up in White Plains, New York. Her father was a forensic photographer, and her mother was a teacher of home economics. She attended Amherst College where she edited the college newspaper, The Amherst Student. She graduated cum laude from Amherst, then graduated from the Harvard Graduate School of Education. She married David Feldman, whom she had met at Amherst, in 2000. Feldman is a writer and puppeteer for children's television.

== Career ==
Strauss-Gabel was associate editor at Clarion Books and was later an editor at Hyperion Books for five years before becoming editor and publisher at Dutton Books, an imprint of the Penguin Group. In one week in April 2015, novels that she edited occupied five of the top ten spots. According to one count, she has edited 22 books which were New York Times Bestsellers. She edited titles such as Will Grayson, Will Grayson. Her books If I Stay and The Fault in Our Stars were adapted into movies. Her books have won book awards including the Printz, two Edgars, a Boston Globe-Horn, and the E.B. White Read Aloud Award. The New York Times described her as having a "knack for spotting and developing talent".

Strauss-Gabel is the president and publisher of Dutton Children's Books.
