= 41st Primetime Emmy Awards =

1989 American television programming awards

- Date: September 17, 1989 (Ceremony); September 16, 1989 (Creative Arts Awards)
- Location: Pasadena Civic Auditorium, Pasadena, California
- Presented by: Academy of Television Arts and Sciences
- Hosted by: John Larroquette

Highlights
- Most awards: Cheers (3)
- Most nominations: L.A. Law (15)
- Outstanding Comedy Series: Cheers
- Outstanding Drama Series: L.A. Law
- Outstanding Miniseries: War and Remembrance
- Outstanding Variety, Music or Comedy Program: The Tracey Ullman Show

Television/radio coverage
- Network: Fox

The 41st Primetime Emmy Awards were held on Sunday, September 17, 1989. The ceremony was broadcast on Fox from the Pasadena Civic Auditorium in Pasadena, California, where 26 awards were presented. The ceremony saw the guest acting categories double, as they were now based on gender as well as genre. Two networks, Lifetime and USA Network, received their first major nominations this year.

After being nominated and losing for the previous four years, Cheers regained the title of Outstanding Comedy Series. L.A. Law also won Outstanding Drama Series after losing the previous year. For the second straight year, L.A. Law received 15 major nominations, making it the first show ever to receive more than 14 major nominations multiple times. With nine main cast acting nominations, L.A. Law tied the record set by Hill Street Blues in 1982.

== Winners and nominees ==
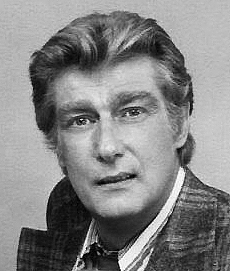
Richard Mulligan, Outstanding Lead Actor in a Comedy Series winner

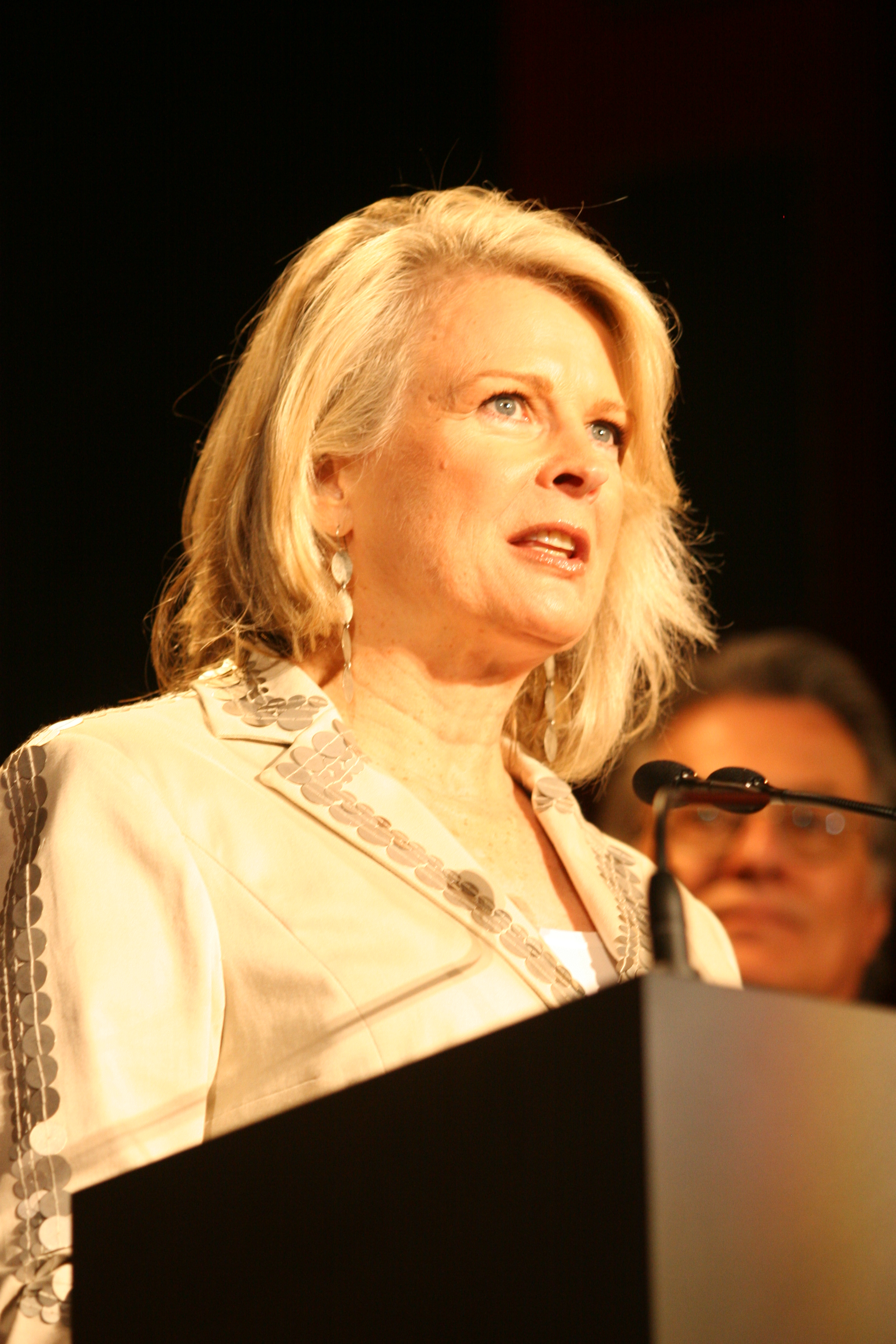
Candice Bergen, Outstanding Lead Actress in a Comedy Series winner

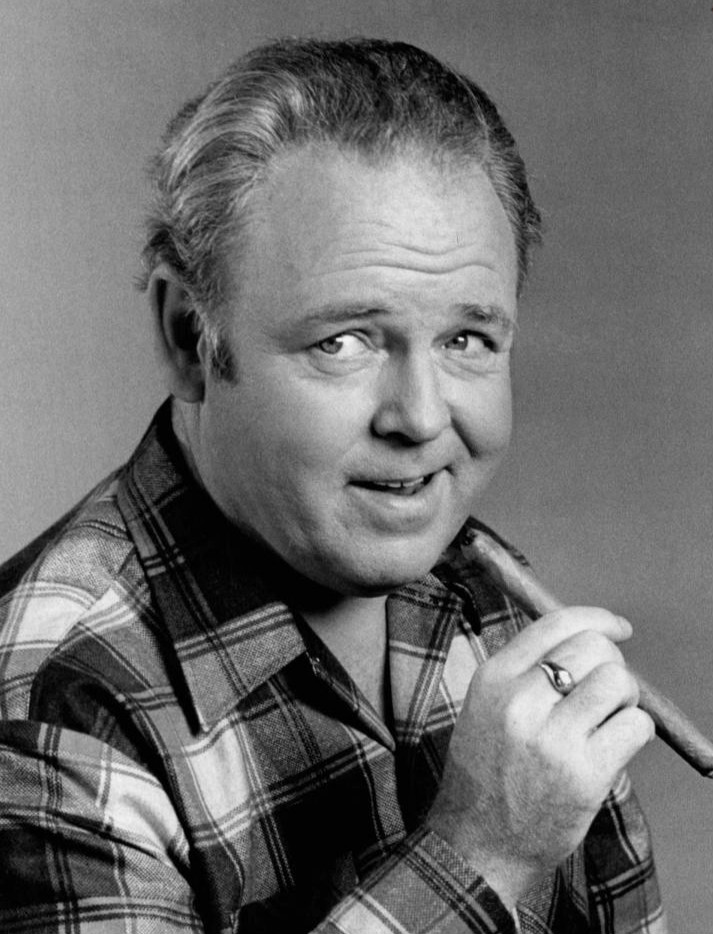
Carroll O'Connor, Outstanding Lead Actor in a Drama Series winner

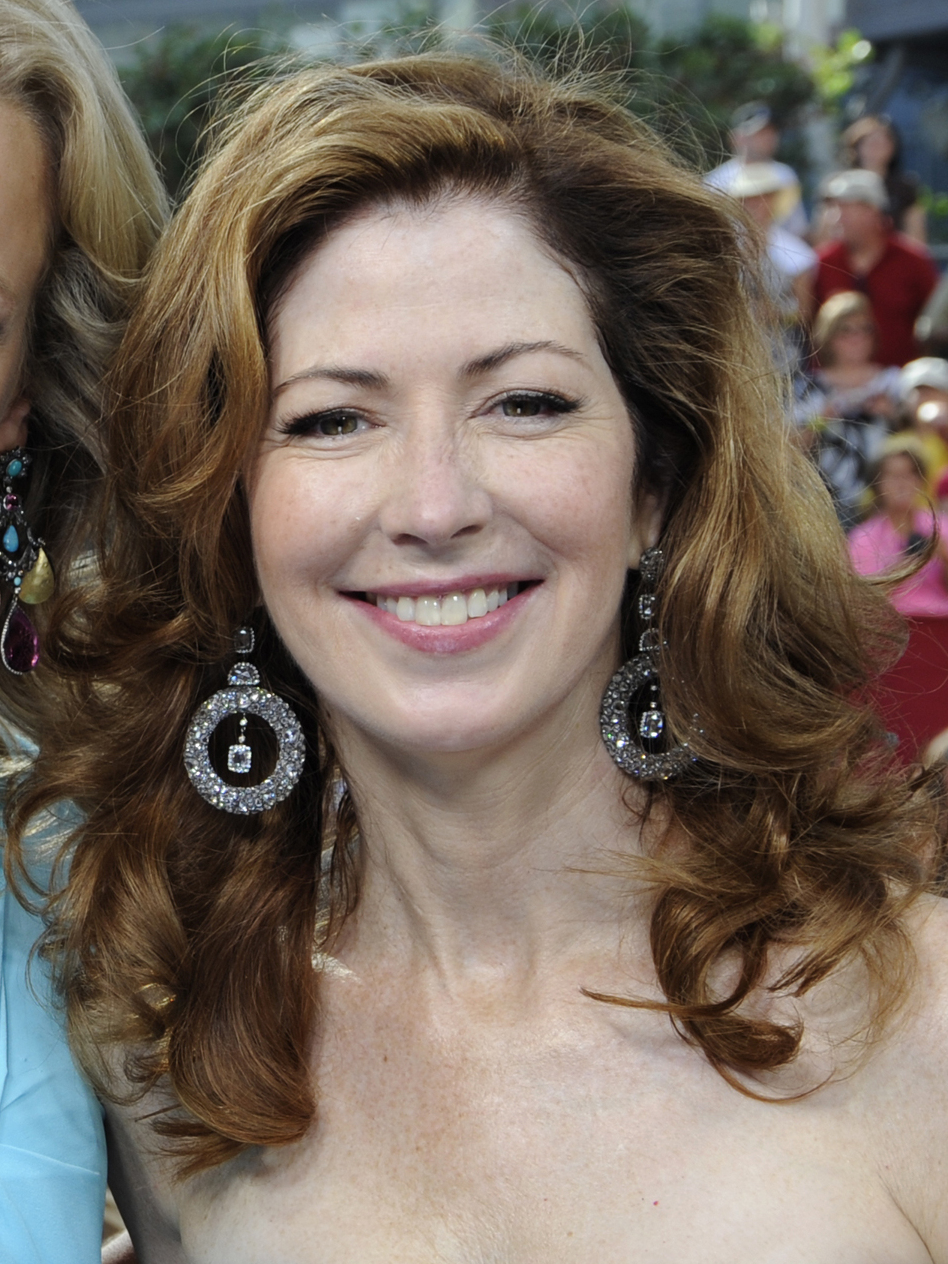
Dana Delany, Outstanding Lead Actress in a Drama Series winner

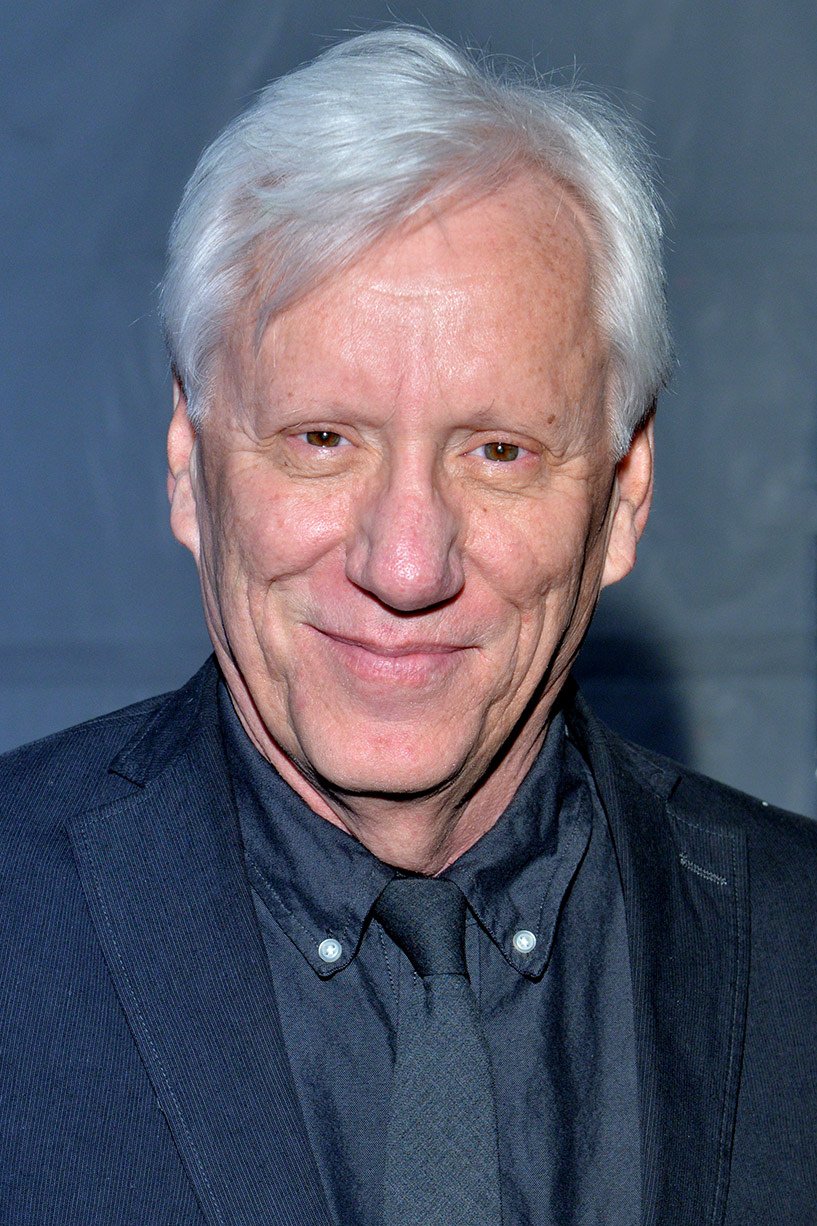
James Woods, Outstanding Lead Actor in a Miniseries or a Special winner

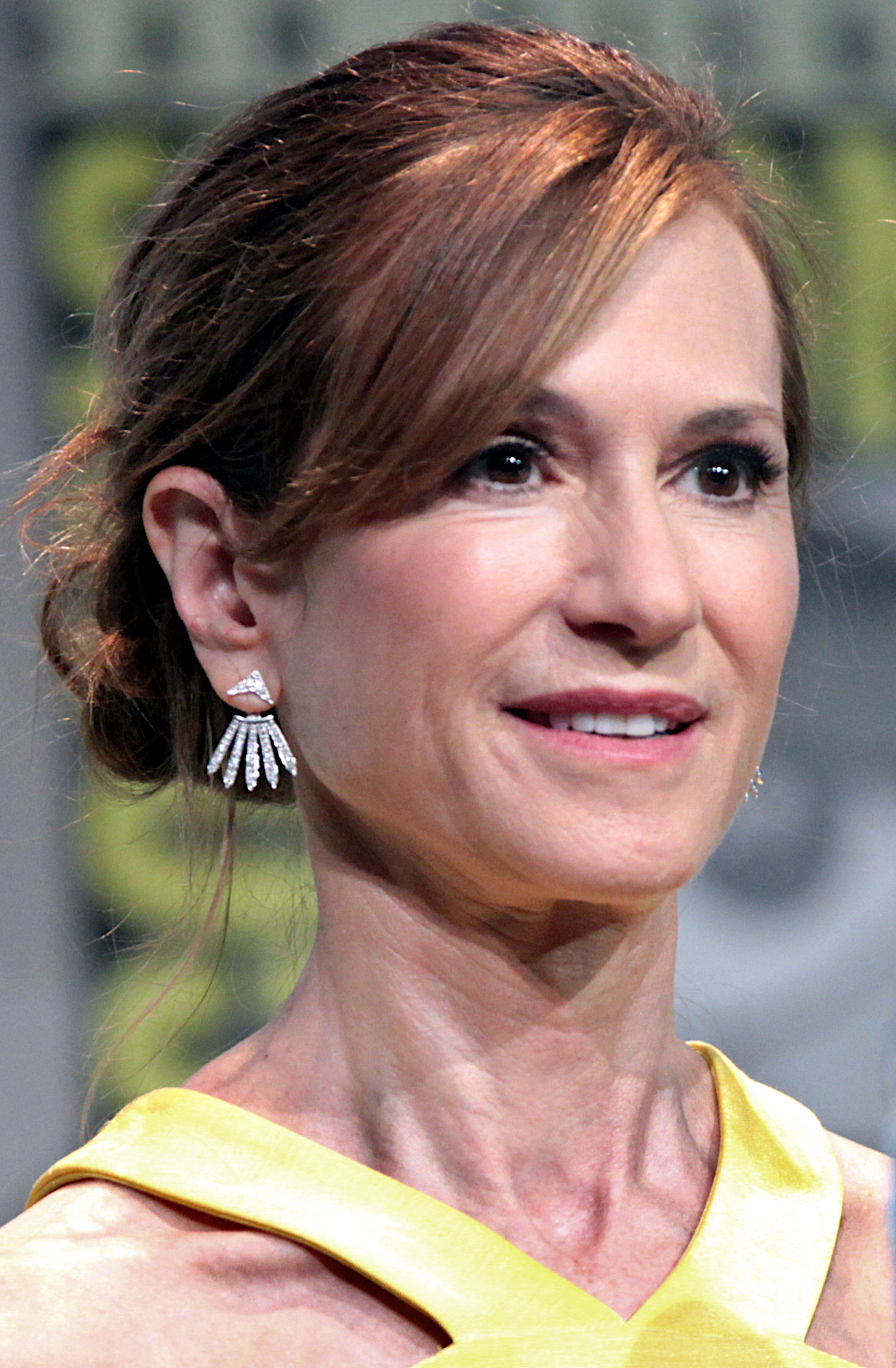
Holly Hunter, Outstanding Lead Actress in a Miniseries or a Special winner

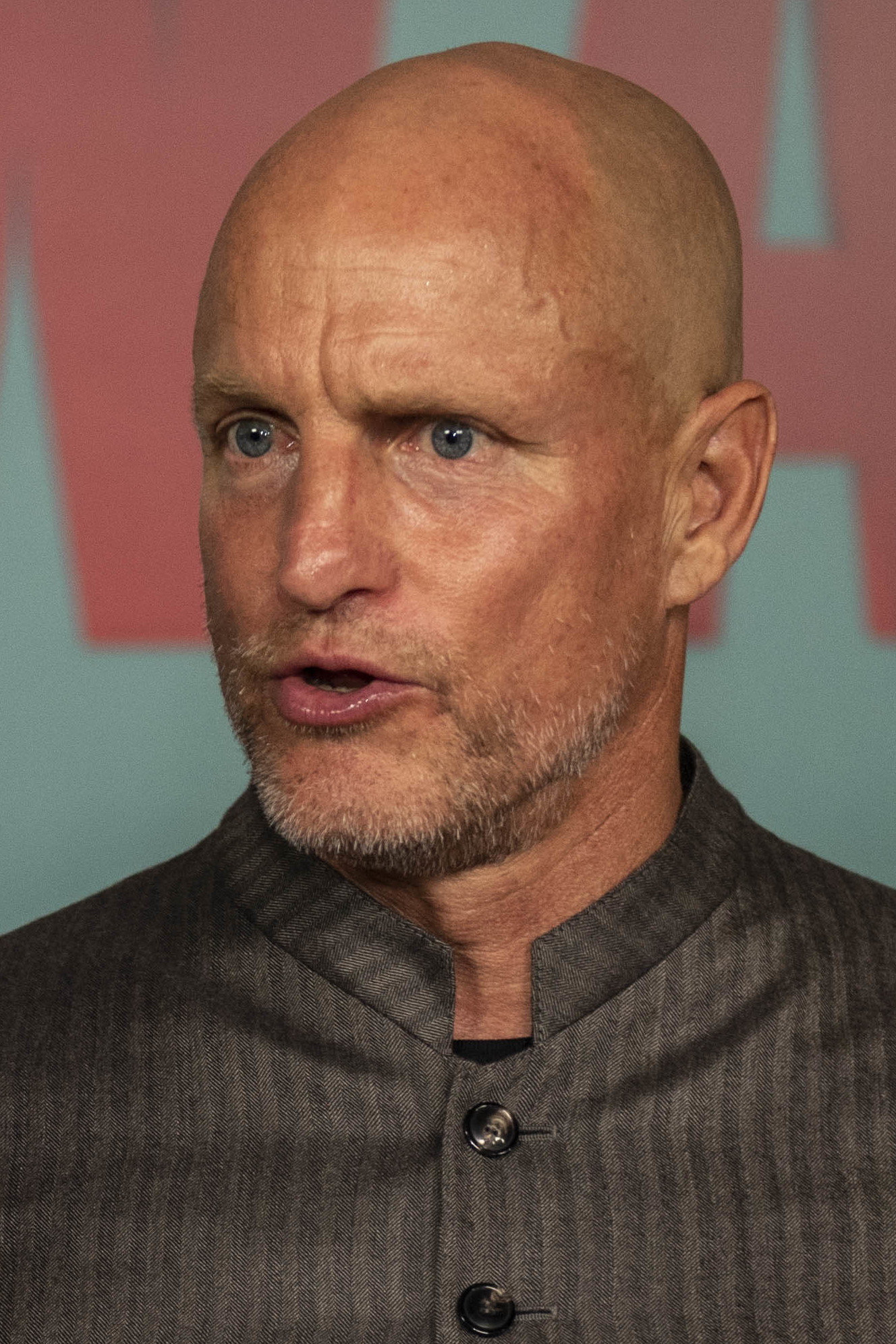
Woody Harrelson, Outstanding Supporting Actor in a Comedy Series winner

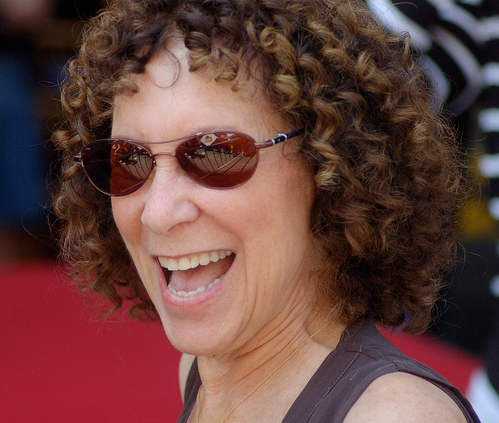
Rhea Perlman, Outstanding Supporting Actress in a Comedy Series winner

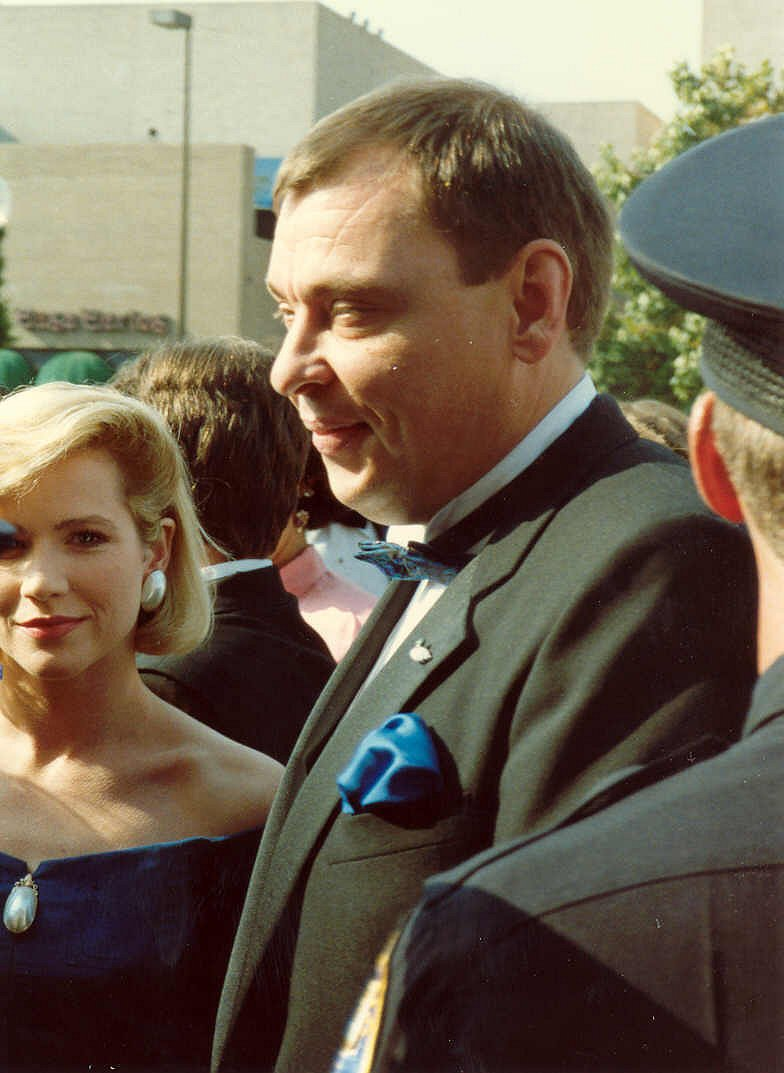
Larry Drake, Outstanding Supporting Actor in a Drama Series winner

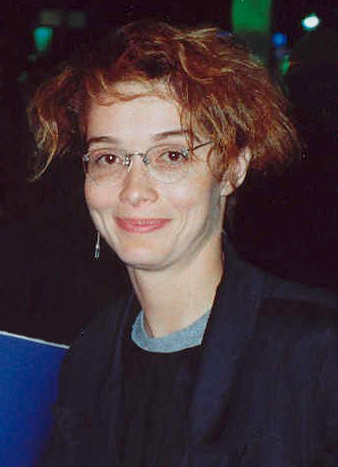
Melanie Mayron, Outstanding Supporting Actress in a Drama Series winner

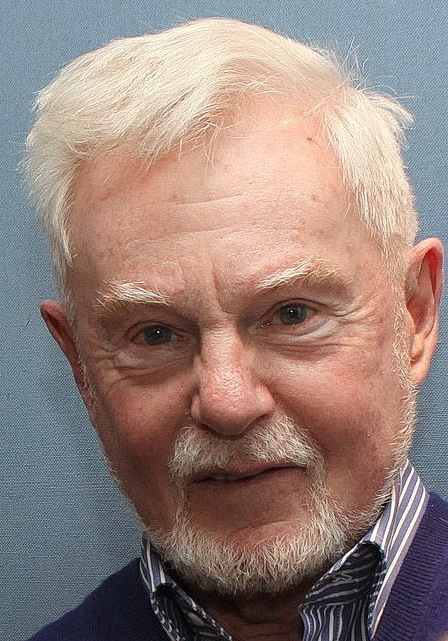
Derek Jacobi, Outstanding Supporting Actor in a Miniseries or a Special winner

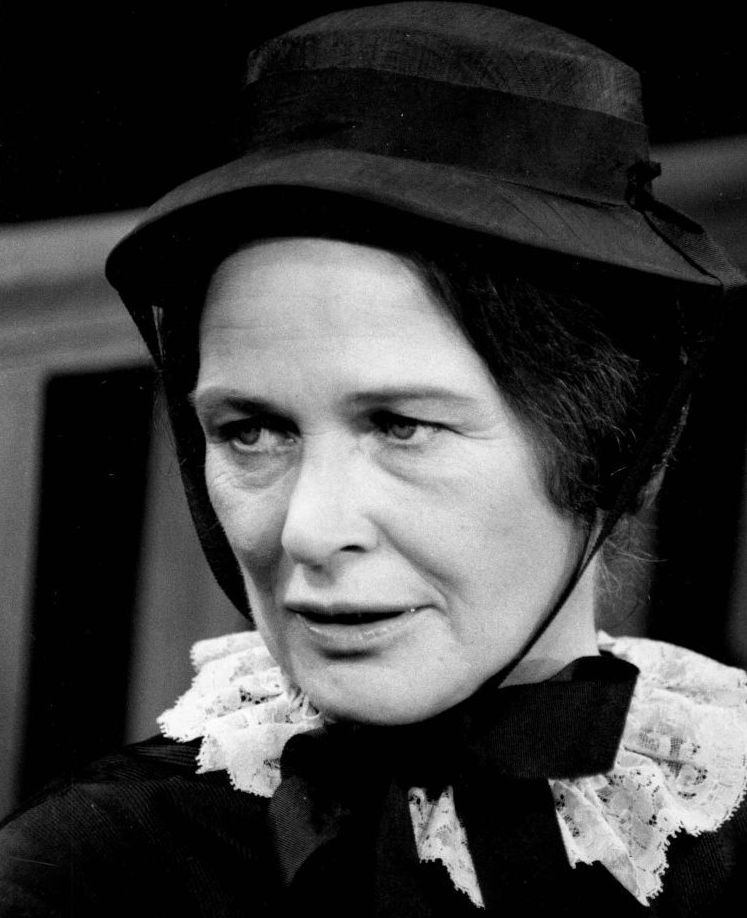
Colleen Dewhurst, Outstanding Supporting Actress in a Miniseries or a Special winner

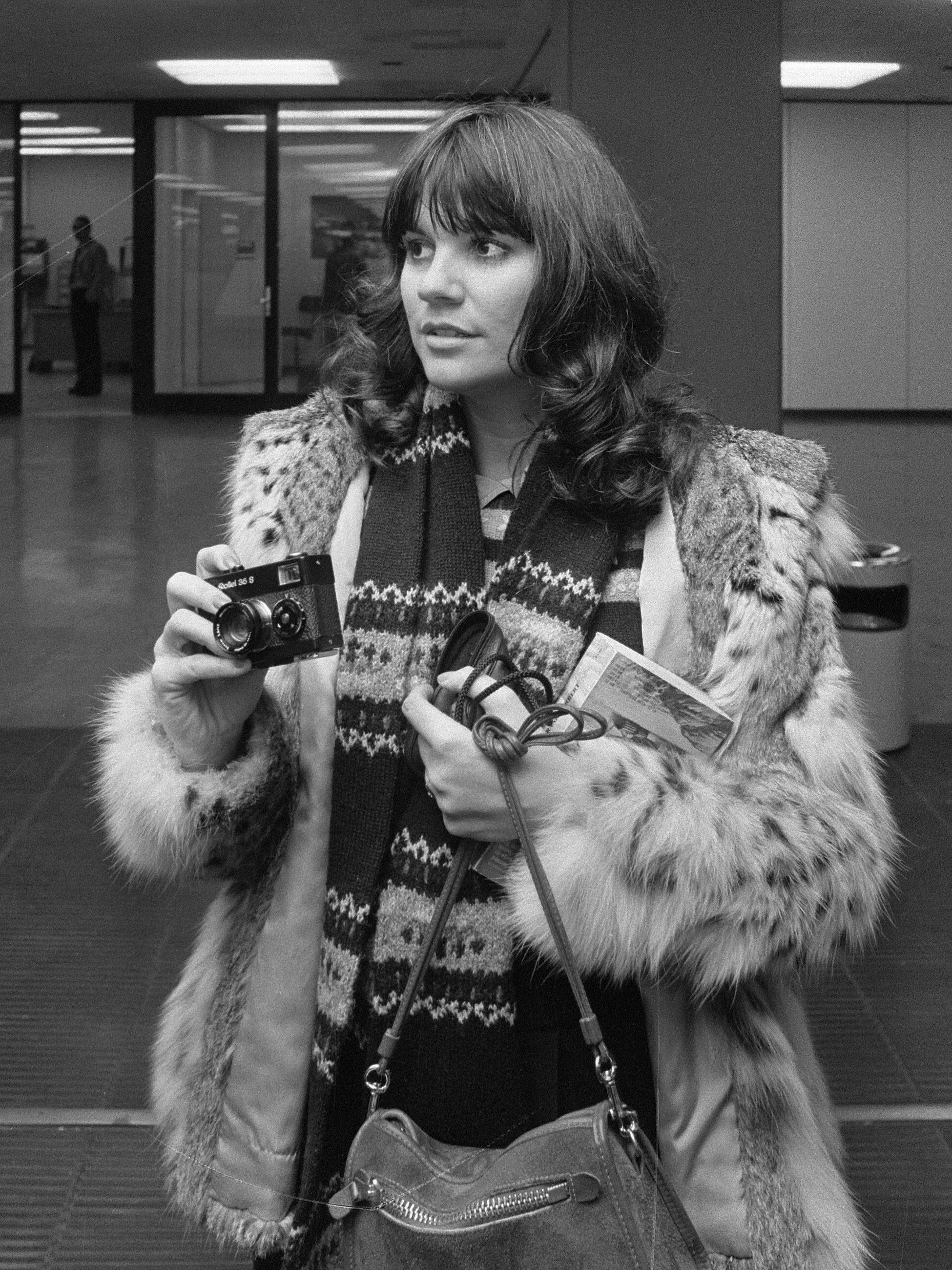
Linda Ronstadt, Outstanding Individual Performance in a Variety or Music Program winner

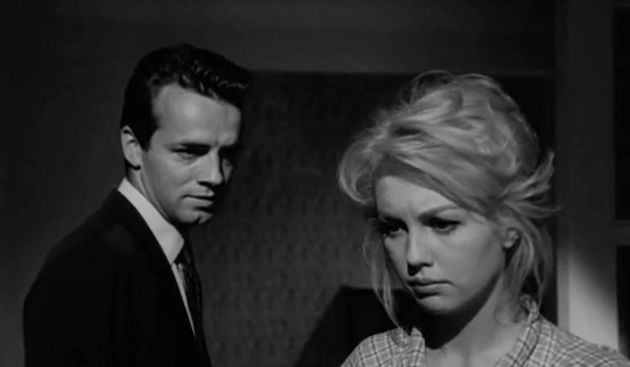
Peter Baldwin (right), Outstanding Directing in a Comedy Series winner

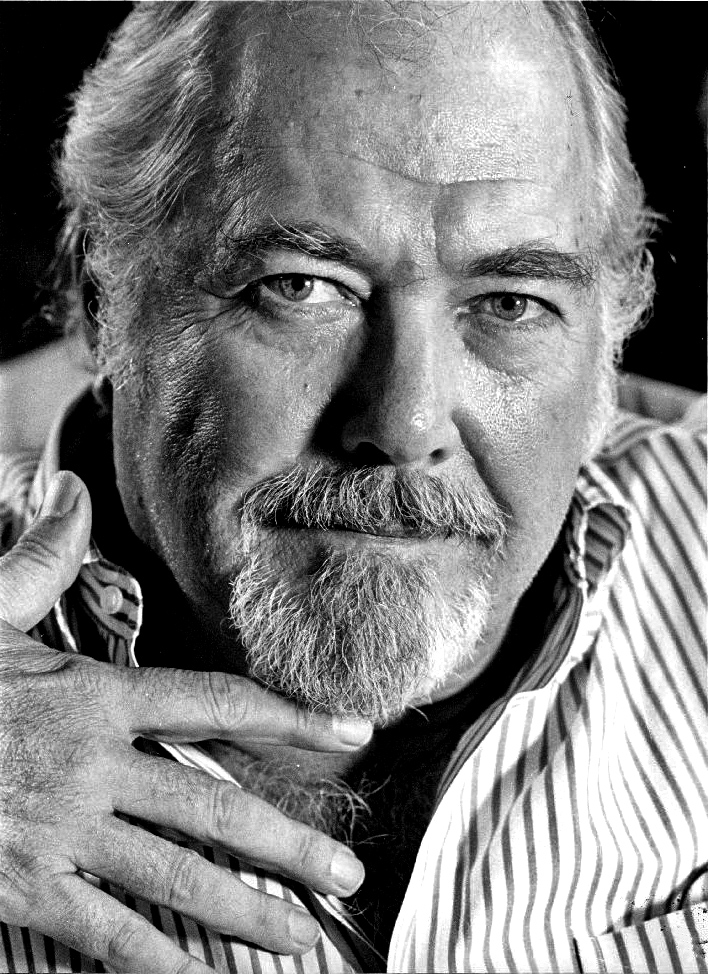
Robert Altman, Outstanding Directing in a Drama Series winner

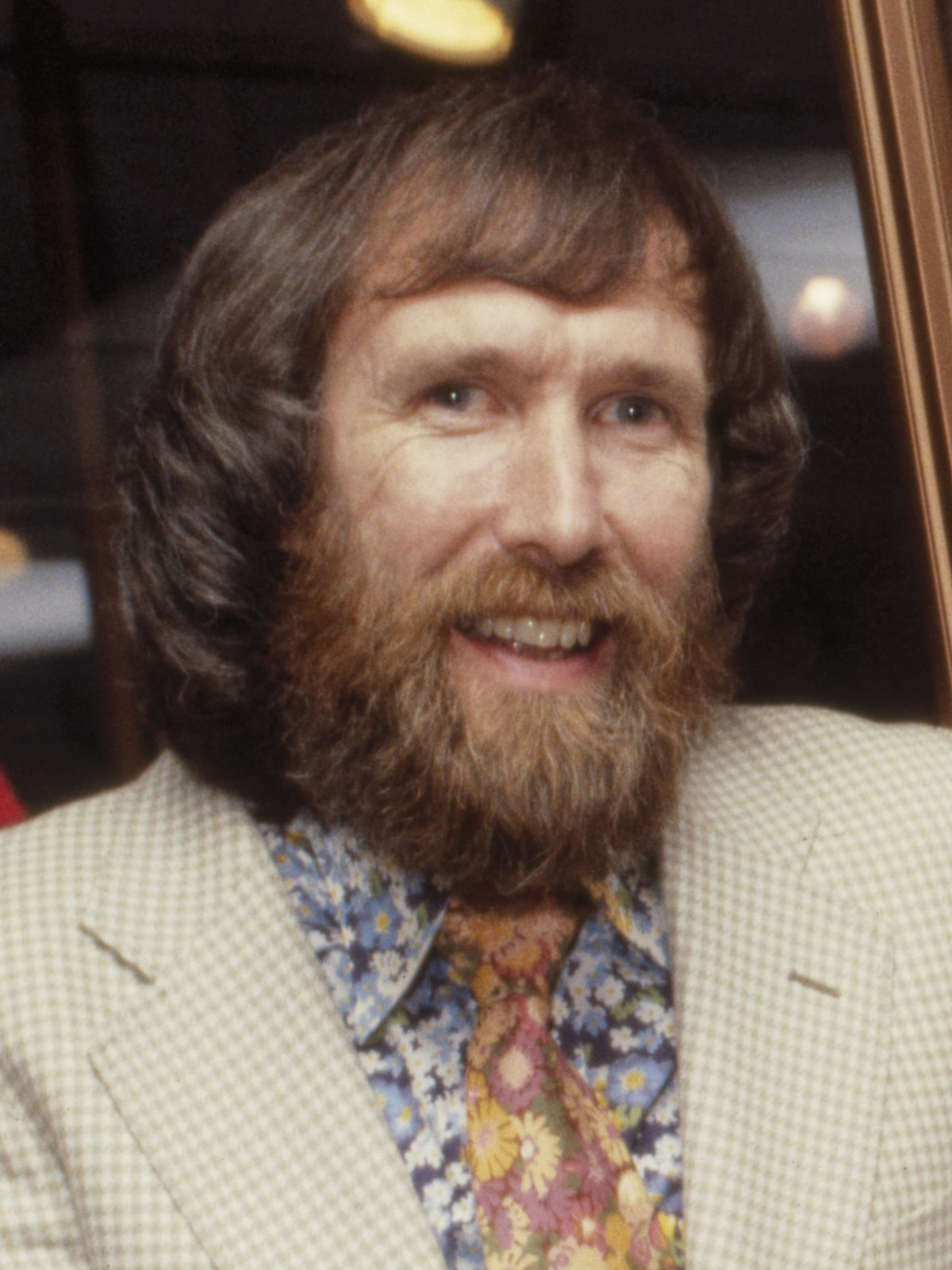
Jim Henson, Outstanding Directing in a Variety or Music Program winner

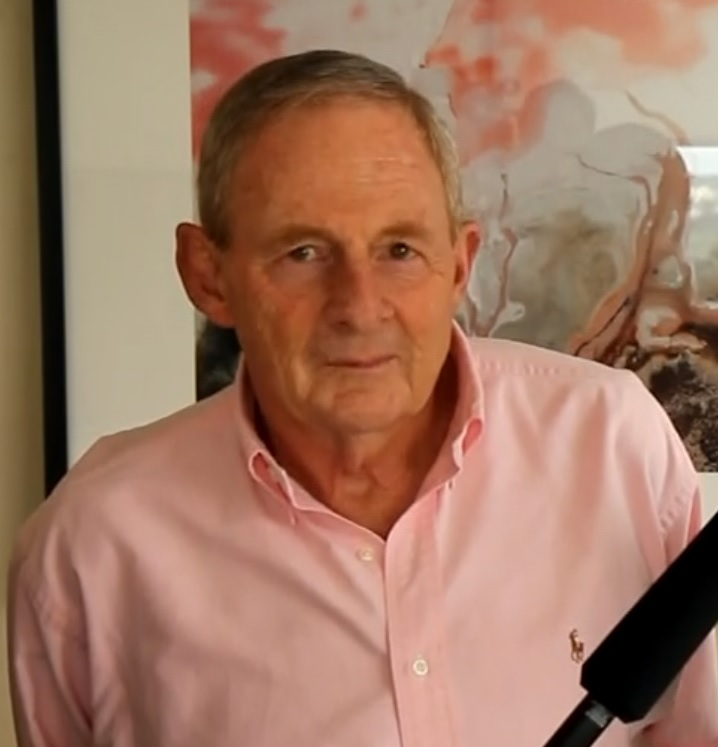
Simon Wincer, Outstanding Directing in a Miniseries or a Special winner

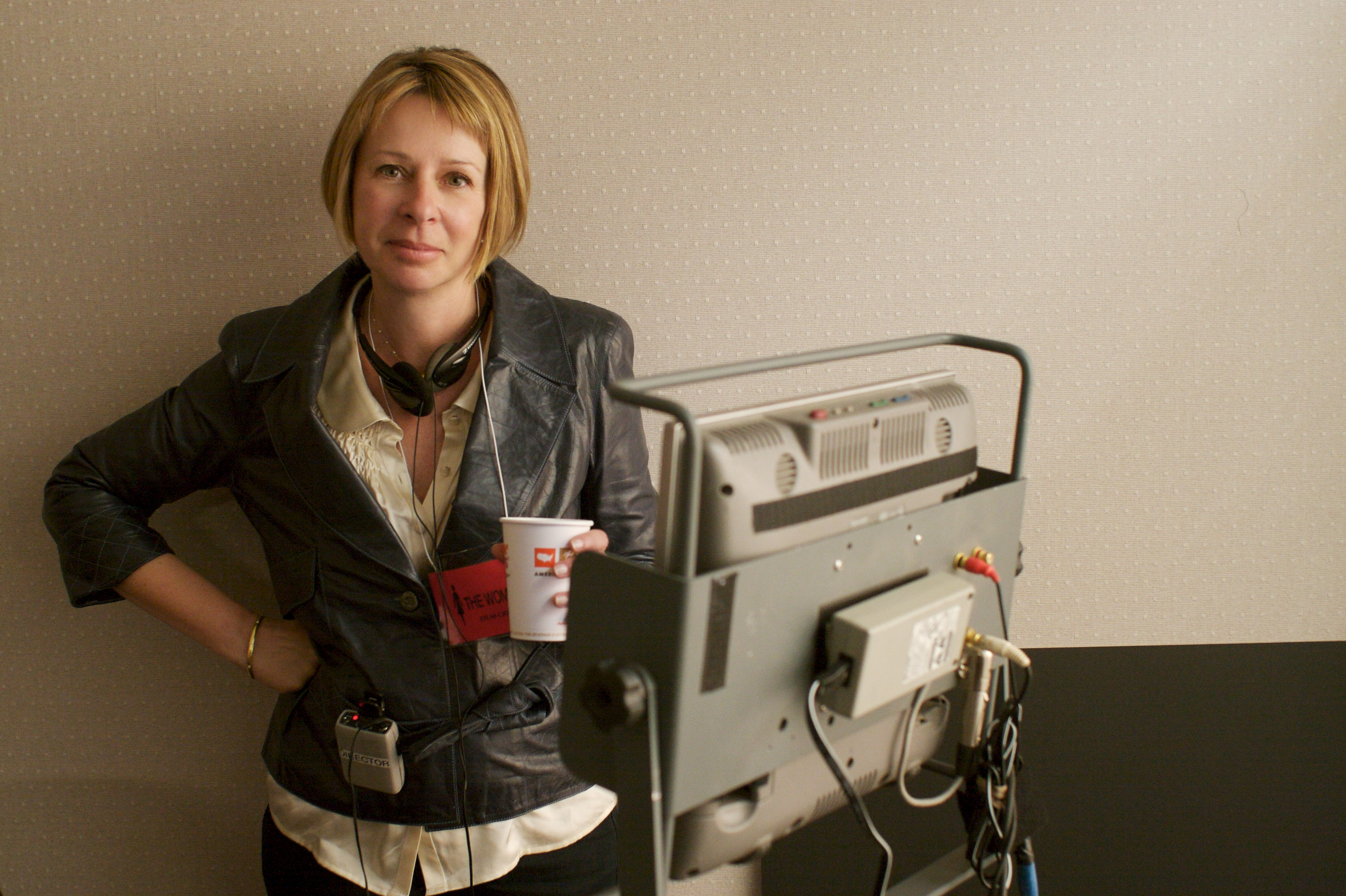
Diane English, Outstanding Writing in a Comedy Series winner

=== Programs ===
Programs
Outstanding Comedy Series: Cheers (NBC); Designing Women (CBS); The Golden Girls (NBC); Murphy Brown (CBS); The Wonder Years (ABC)	Outstanding Drama Series: L.A. Law (NBC); Beauty and the Beast (CBS); China Beach (ABC); Thirtysomething (ABC); Wiseguy (CBS)
Outstanding Drama/Comedy Special: Day One (CBS); Roe vs. Wade (NBC); David (ABC); Murderers Among Us: The Simon Wiesenthal Story (HBO); My Name Is Bill W. (ABC)	Outstanding Miniseries: War and Remembrance (ABC); I Know My First Name Is Steven (NBC); Lonesome Dove (CBS); A Perfect Spy (PBS); The Women of Brewster Place (ABC)
Outstanding Variety, Music or Comedy Program: The Tracey Ullman Show (Fox); The Arsenio Hall Show (Syndicated); Late Night with David Letterman (NBC); Saturday Night Live (NBC); Tap Dance in America (PBS)

=== Acting ===
==== Lead performances ====
Acting
Outstanding Lead Actor in a Comedy Series: Richard Mulligan as Dr. Harry Weston in Empty Nest (NBC) (Episode: "Pilot"); Ted Danson as Sam Malone in Cheers (NBC) (Episode: "Swear to God"); Michael J. Fox as Alex P. Keaton in Family Ties (NBC) (Episode: "Alex Doesn't Live Here Anymore"); John Goodman as Dan Conner in Roseanne (ABC) (Episode: "Dan's Birthday Bash"); Fred Savage as Kevin Arnold in The Wonder Years (ABC) (Episode: "Birthday Boy")	Outstanding Lead Actress in a Comedy Series: Candice Bergen as Murphy Brown in Murphy Brown (CBS) (Episode: "Respect"); Bea Arthur as Dorothy Zbornak in The Golden Girls (NBC) (Episode: "Love Me Tender"); Blair Brown as Molly Dodd in The Days and Nights of Molly Dodd (Lifetime); Rue McClanahan as Blanche Devereaux in The Golden Girls (NBC) (Episode: "Yes, We Have No Havanas"); Betty White as Rose Nylund in The Golden Girls (NBC) (Episode: "High Anxiety")
Outstanding Lead Actor in a Drama Series: Carroll O'Connor as Chief Bill Gillespie in In the Heat of the Night (NBC) (Episode: "A Trip Upstate"); Ron Perlman as Vincent in Beauty and the Beast (CBS); Michael Tucker as Stuart Markowitz in L.A. Law (NBC); Ken Wahl as Vincent Terranova in Wiseguy (CBS); Edward Woodward as Robert McCall in The Equalizer (CBS)	Outstanding Lead Actress in a Drama Series: Dana Delany as Nurse Colleen McMurphy in China Beach (ABC) (Episode: "The World"); Susan Dey as Grace Van Owen in L.A. Law (NBC); Jill Eikenberry as Ann Kelsey in L.A. Law (NBC); Linda Hamilton as Asst. DA Catherine Chandler in Beauty and the Beast (CBS); Angela Lansbury as Jessica Fletcher in Murder, She Wrote (CBS)
Outstanding Lead Actor in a Miniseries or a Special: James Woods as Bill Wilson in My Name Is Bill W. (ABC); Robert Duvall as Augustus "Gus" McCrae in Lonesome Dove (CBS) (Episode: "Part II"); John Gielgud as Aaron Jastrow in War and Remembrance (ABC) (Episode: "Part VIII"); Tommy Lee Jones as Woodrow F. Call in Lonesome Dove (CBS) (Episode: "Part IV"); Ben Kingsley as Simon Wiesenthal in Murderers Among Us: The Simon Wiesenthal Story (HBO)	Outstanding Lead Actress in a Miniseries or a Special: Holly Hunter as Ellen Russell in Roe vs. Wade (NBC); Anjelica Huston as Clara Allen in Lonesome Dove (CBS) (Episode: "Part III"); Diane Lane as Lorena Wood in Lonesome Dove (CBS) (Episode: "Part IV"); Amy Madigan as Sarah Weddington in Roe vs. Wade (NBC); Jane Seymour as Natalie Henry in War and Remembrance (ABC) (Episode: "Part XI")

==== Supporting performances ====
Outstanding Supporting Actor in a Comedy Series: Woody Harrelson as Woody Boyd in Cheers (NBC) (Episodes: "Golden Boyd" + "The Gift of the Woodi" + "Call Me Irresponsible"); Joe Regalbuto as Frank Fontana in Murphy Brown (CBS) (Episodes: "Baby Love" + "It's How You Play the Game" + "The Summer of '77"); Peter Scolari as Michael Harris in Newhart (CBS); Meshach Taylor as Anthony Bouvier in Designing Women (CBS) (Episodes: "Hard Hats and Lovers" + "Tyrone" + "One Sees, the Other Doesn't"); George Wendt as Norm Peterson in Cheers (NBC) (Episodes: "Norm, Is That You?" + "Jumping Jerks" + "Don't Paint Your Chickens")	Outstanding Supporting Actress in a Comedy Series: Rhea Perlman as Carla Tortelli in Cheers (NBC) (Episodes: "Swear to God" + "Those Lips, Those Ice" + "I Kid You Not"); Julia Duffy as Stephanie Vanderkellen in Newhart (CBS); Faith Ford as Corky Sherwood in Murphy Brown (CBS) (Episodes: "Devil with a Blue Dress On" + "It's How You Play the Game" + "The Morning Show"); Estelle Getty as Sophia Petrillo in The Golden Girls (NBC) (Episodes: "The Days and Nights of Sophia Petrillo" + "Sophia's Wedding" + "Two Rode Together"); Katherine Helmond as Mona Robinson in Who's the Boss? (ABC) (Episodes: "Double Dump" + "Your Grandmother's a Bimbo" + "Party Double")
Outstanding Supporting Actor in a Drama Series: Larry Drake as Benny Stulwicz in L.A. Law (NBC) (Episodes: "Hey, Lick Me Over" + "I'm in the Nude for Love" + "America the Beautiful"); Jonathan Banks as Frank McPike in Wiseguy (CBS); Timothy Busfield as Elliot Weston in Thirtysomething (ABC); Richard Dysart as Leland McKenzie Jr. in L.A. Law (NBC); Jimmy Smits as Victor Sifuentes in L.A. Law (NBC)	Outstanding Supporting Actress in a Drama Series: Melanie Mayron as Melissa Steadman in Thirtysomething (ABC) (Episodes: "Trust Me" + "Success" + "Be a Good Girl"); Michele Greene as Abby Perkins in L.A. Law (NBC) (Episodes: "Sperminator" + "Victor/Victorious" + "America the Beautiful"); Lois Nettleton as Joanne St. John in In the Heat of the Night (NBC) (Episodes: "Stranger in Town" + "Tear Down the Walls" + "A.K.A. Kelly Kay"); Amanda Plummer as Alice Hackett in L.A. Law (NBC) (Episodes: "America the Beautiful" + "Urine Trouble Now" + "Consumed Innocent"); Susan Ruttan as Roxanne Melman in L.A. Law (NBC) (Episodes: "Romancing the Drone" + "Izzy Ackerman or Is He Not?" + "Urine Trouble Now")
Outstanding Supporting Actor in a Miniseries or a Special: Derek Jacobi as The Imposter in The Tenth Man (CBS); Armand Assante as Richard Mansfield in Jack the Ripper (CBS); James Garner as Dr. Bob Holbrook Smith in My Name Is Bill W. (ABC); Danny Glover as Joshua Deets in Lonesome Dove (CBS) (Episode: "Part II"); Corin Nemec as Steven Stayner in I Know My First Name Is Steven (NBC) (Episode: "Part I")	Outstanding Supporting Actress in a Miniseries or a Special: Colleen Dewhurst as Margaret Page in Those She Left Behind (NBC); Peggy Ashcroft as Miss Dubber in A Perfect Spy (PBS) (Episode: "Part V"); Polly Bergen as Rhoda Henry in War and Remembrance (ABC) (Episode: "Part XII"); Glenne Headly as Elmira Boot Johnson in Lonesome Dove (CBS) (Episode: "Part II"); Paula Kelly as Theresa in The Women of Brewster Place (ABC)

==== Individual performances ====
Outstanding Individual Performance in a Variety or Music Program
- Linda Ronstadt – Great Performances: "Canciones de Mi Padre" (PBS)
  - Dana Carvey – Saturday Night Live (NBC)
  - Julie Kavner – The Tracey Ullman Show (Fox)
  - The cast of Sid and Marty Krofft's D.C. Follies Episode 202 (Syndicated)
  - The cast of Sid and Marty Krofft's D.C. Follies Episode 211 (Syndicated)

=== Directing ===
Directing
Outstanding Directing in a Comedy Series: The Wonder Years (ABC): "Our Miss White" – Peter Baldwin; Cheers (NBC): "The Visiting Lecher" – James Burrows; The Golden Girls (NBC): "Brother Can You Spare That Jacket" – Terry Hughes; Murphy Brown (CBS): "Pilot" – Barnet Kellman; The Wonder Years (ABC): "Birthday Boy" – Steve Miner; The Wonder Years (ABC): "How I'm Spending My Summer Vacation" – Michael Dinner	Outstanding Directing in a Drama Series: Tanner '88 (HBO): "The Boiler Room" – Robert Altman; L.A. Law (NBC): "I'm in the Nude for Love" – Eric Laneuville; L.A. Law (NBC): "To Live and Diet in L.A." – John Pasquin; Midnight Caller (NBC): "Pilot" – Thomas Carter; Thirtysomething (ABC): "We'll Meet Again" – Scott Winant
Outstanding Directing in a Variety or Music Program: The Jim Henson Hour (NBC): "Dog City" – Jim Henson; The Debbie Allen Special (ABC) – Debbie Allen; Late Night with David Letterman (NBC): "In Chicago" – Hal Gurnee; Tap Dance in America (PBS) – Don Mischer; The Tracey Ullman Show (Fox): "Family Therapy" – Ted Bessell	Outstanding Directing in a Miniseries or a Special: Lonesome Dove (CBS): "Part IV" – Simon Wincer; I Know My First Name Is Steven (NBC) – Larry Elikann; My Name Is Bill W. (ABC) – Daniel Petrie; Roe vs. Wade (NBC) – Gregory Hoblit; War and Remembrance (ABC): "Part XII" – Dan Curtis

=== Writing ===
Writing
Outstanding Writing in a Comedy Series: Murphy Brown (CBS): "Respect" – Diane English; The Wonder Years (ABC): "Coda" – Todd W. Langen; The Wonder Years (ABC): "Loosiers" – David M. Stern; The Wonder Years (ABC): "Our Miss White" – Michael J. Weithorn; The Wonder Years (ABC): "Pottery Will Get You Nowhere" – Matthew Carlson	Outstanding Writing in a Drama Series: Thirtysomething (ABC): "First Day / Last Day" – Joseph Dougherty; L.A. Law (NBC): "His Suit Is Hirsute" – Steven Bochco, David E. Kelley, Michele Gallery and William M. Finkelstein; L.A. Law (NBC): "I'm in the Nude for Love" – David E. Kelley; L.A. Law (NBC): "Urine Trouble Now" – David E. Kelley, William M. Finkelstein, Michele Gallery and Judith Parker; Thirtysomething (ABC): "The Mike Van Dyke Show" – Marshall Herskovitz and Edward Zwick
Outstanding Writing in a Variety or Music Program: Saturday Night Live (NBC); Late Night with David Letterman (NBC): "Seventh Anniversary Special"; Not Necessarily the News (HBO); The Tonight Show Starring Johnny Carson (NBC); The Tracey Ullman Show (Fox)	Outstanding Writing in a Miniseries or a Special: Murderers Among Us: The Simon Wiesenthal Story (HBO) – Abby Mann, Robin Vote and Ron Hutchinson; I Know My First Name Is Steven (NBC) – Story by : JP Miller Teleplay by : JP Miller and Cynthia Whitcomb; Lonesome Dove (CBS): "Part I" – Bill Wyttliff; My Name Is Bill W. (ABC) – William G. Borchert; Roe vs. Wade (NBC) – Alison Cross

== Most major nominations ==
Networks with multiple major nominations (Note: "Major" constitutes the categories listed above: Program, Acting, Directing, and Writing. Does not include the technical categories.)
Network	Number of Nominations
NBC	57
ABC	40
CBS	35

Programs with multiple major nominations
Program	Category	Network	Number of Nominations
L.A. Law	Drama	NBC	15
Lonesome Dove	Miniseries	CBS	9
The Wonder Years	Comedy	ABC	9
Cheers	Comedy	NBC	6
The Golden Girls	Comedy	NBC	6
Murphy Brown	Comedy	CBS	6
Thirtysomething	Drama	ABC	6
My Name Is Bill W.	Special	ABC	5
Roe vs. Wade	Special	NBC	5
War and Remembrance	Miniseries	ABC	5
I Know My First Name Is Steven	Miniseries	NBC	4
The Tracey Ullman Show	Variety	Fox	4
Beauty and the Beast	Drama	CBS	3
Late Night with David Letterman	Variety	NBC	3
Murderers Among Us: The Simon Wiesenthal Story	Special	HBO	3
Saturday Night Live	Variety	NBC	3
Wiseguy	Drama	CBS	3
China Beach	Drama	ABC	2
D.C. Follies	Variety	Syndicated	2
Designing Women	Comedy	CBS	2
In the Heat of the Night	Drama	NBC	2
Newhart	Comedy	CBS	2
A Perfect Spy	Miniseries	PBS	2
Tap Dance in America	Variety	PBS	2
The Women of Brewster Place	Miniseries	ABC	2

== Most major awards ==
Networks with multiple major awards
Network	Number of Awards
NBC	12
ABC	6
CBS	5
HBO	2

Programs with multiple major awards
Program	Category	Network	Number of Awards
Cheers	Comedy	NBC	3
Murphy Brown	Comedy	CBS	2
L.A. Law	Drama	NBC	2
Roe vs. Wade	Special	NBC	2
Thirtysomething	Drama	ABC	2
