= When Love Is Not Enough: The Lois Wilson Story =

2010 television film by John Kent Harrison

- Promotional image
- Genre: Biographical drama
- Based on: The Lois Wilson Story: When Love Is Not Enough by William G. Borchert
- Written by: William G. Borchert; Camille Thomasson
- Directed by: John Kent Harrison
- Starring: Winona Ryder; Barry Pepper; John Bourgeois; Rosemary Dunsmore
- Music by: Lawrence Shragge
- Country of origin: United States
- Original language: English

Production
- Executive producers: Ira Pincus; John Morayniss; Brent Shields
- Producer: Terry Gould
- Cinematography: Miroslaw Baszak
- Editor: Ron Wisman
- Running time: 95 minutes
- Production companies: E1 Entertainment; Hallmark Hall of Fame Productions

Original release
- Network: CBS
- Release: April 25, 2010

When Love Is Not Enough: The Lois Wilson Story is a 2010 American biographical drama television film about Lois Wilson, the co-founder of Al-Anon, and her alcoholic husband Bill Wilson, the co-founder of Alcoholics Anonymous. Based on William G. Borchert's 2005 biography The Lois Wilson Story: When Love Is Not Enough, the film was directed by John Kent Harrison, written by Borchert and Camille Thomasson, and stars Winona Ryder as Lois and Barry Pepper as Bill. John Bourgeois and Rosemary Dunsmore also star.

The film premiered on CBS on April 25, 2010, as an episode of the Hallmark Hall of Fame anthology series.

== Plot ==
In 1914, Lois Burnham, a college-educated woman from an affluent family, meets and falls in love with Bill Wilson, a 19-year-old man of modest means. They marry in 1918. After his return from World War I, the two set out to build a life together.

While Lois works as a nurse, Bill struggles to find his niche. Lois believes that Bill is destined for greatness, and despite his increasing reliance on alcohol, she showers him with love and support. Eventually, Lois persuades a friend's husband to hire Bill at his financial firm. By 1927, Bill is working on Wall Street. The couple lives a luxurious lifestyle, but despite Lois's valiant efforts to control his drinking, Bill's alcoholism spirals out of control, and his job, their lifestyle, and their dreams are all gone.

In 1935, after years of struggling to cover for Bill and trying desperately to manage his disease by herself, Lois finally sees him get and stay sober – not through her help, but from the support of a fellow alcoholic, Dr. Bob Smith. Bill and Bob attain lasting sobriety and co-found Alcoholics Anonymous. During this time, Lois feels neglected. Bill manages to stay sober without her help and she now feels isolated and resentful. Lois discovers she is not alone in her isolation and anger, that there is a vast number of people whose lives and relationships have been devastated because a loved one is an alcoholic or drug addict. To help herself and others like her, she co-founds Al-Anon in 1951.

== Cast ==
- Winona Ryder as Lois Wilson
- Barry Pepper as Bill Wilson
- John Bourgeois as Dr. Clark Burnham
- Frank Moore as Dr. Bob Smith
- Rosemary Dunsmore as Matilda Burnham
- Ellen Dubin as Dora
- Adam Greydon Reid as Ebby Thacher
- Rick Roberts as Frank Shaw

== Production ==
When Love Is Not Enough: The Lois Wilson Story is the 240th presentation by Hallmark Hall of Fame, the long-running anthology program of American television films. The film was set primarily in the US but filmed in Canada.

== Reception ==
The film was given mixed reviews by critics. It was released on DVD in Hallmark stores in the United States.

In its original American broadcast on April 25, 2010, When Love is Not Enough was seen by 7.29 million viewers, according to MediaWeek. It was out performed during the same time slot by both Brothers & Sisters and Celebrity Apprentice.

Linda Stasi in the New York Post wrote, "Everyone does a wonderful job in this movie -- but, in the end, it seems more like a rehash of writer William G. Borchert's 1989 'Hall of Fame' movie, My Name Is Bill W. than a real portrait of the woman whose idea helped millions of suffering families." Mathew Gilbert in The Boston Globe wrote, "This new CBS Hallmark movie does its job effectively enough, bringing us through the ups and downs of Bill and Lois Wilson's marriage as they wrestle with his addiction."

== Award nominations ==
The film has been nominated for several awards:

- Screen Actors Guild Awards
  - Outstanding Performance by a Female Actor in a Miniseries or Television Movie - Winona Ryder
- Satellite Awards
  - Best Actor – Miniseries or Television Film - Barry Pepper (nomination)
  - Best Actress – Miniseries or Television Film - Winona Ryder (nomination)
  - Best TV Film (nomination)
- Emmy Awards
  - Music Composition for a Miniseries, Movie, or Special - Lawrence Shragge (nomination)
