= William G. Borchert =

American screenwriter (1933–2022)

William G. Borchert (September 9, 1933 – October 1, 2022) was an American screenwriter and author who wrote the script for the 1989 film My Name is Bill W., based on the true story of Alcoholics Anonymous founder Bill Wilson.

Borchert was born in Brooklyn, New York, on September 9, 1933. In 2005, he published a book about Bill Wilson's wife, Lois, called The Lois Wilson Story: When Love is Not Enough. A TV-movie with the same title, based on the book, was released in 2010. Borchert was also a director of Stepping Stones Foundation, the home of the Wilsons in New York. A second book, 1,000 Years of Sobriety: 20 People x 50 Years (2010), co-authored with Michael Fitzpatrick, tells the story of twenty pioneers of Alcoholics Anonymous from United States, Canada, Australia & New Zealand.

Borchert died on October 1, 2022, at the age of 89.
