= Lois W. =

American activist

- Born: Lois Burnham; March 4, 1891; Brooklyn, New York, U.S.
- Died: October 5, 1988 (aged 97); Mount Kisco, New York, U.S.
- Resting place: East Dorset Cemetery, East Dorset, Vermont; 43.216638°N 73.015148°W
- Spouse: Bill W. (m. 1918; died 1971)

Lois Wilson (née Burnham; March 4, 1891 – October 5, 1988), also known as Lois W., was the co-founder of Al-Anon Family Groups, a 12-Step fellowship for the friends and family of alcoholics. She was the wife of Alcoholics Anonymous (AA) co-founder Bill W. They both followed their respective groups' tradition of anonymity until The New York Times revealed their full names upon Bill's death in 1971. However, she continued to be known as Lois W. within Al-Anon until her death.

== Early life and education ==
Lois was the first of six children born to Matilda Burnham (née Spelman) and Brooklyn Heights New York surgeon Clark Burnham. Lois was raised in the Swedenborgian faith, of which her grandfather was a pastor. Lois's kindergarten was run by the Pratt Institute, and after that she attended Friends School. She graduated from the Packer Collegiate Institute with a concentration in the fine arts. She had a talent for drawing, and later became an interior decorator. After graduation she worked for the YWCA and later taught at a school in Short Hills, New Jersey.

== Marriage and career ==
The Burnham family spent summers in Vermont, where Dr. Burnham provided medical care to vacationers. Rogers Burnham, a younger brother of Lois, became friends with a local boy named Bill Wilson (William Griffith Wilson). Lois and Bill met in the summer of 1914, when Lois was 23 and Bill was 19. At that time, Lois was a college graduate and working with the YWCA. Bill was working his way through Norwich University. The following summer they secretly became engaged.

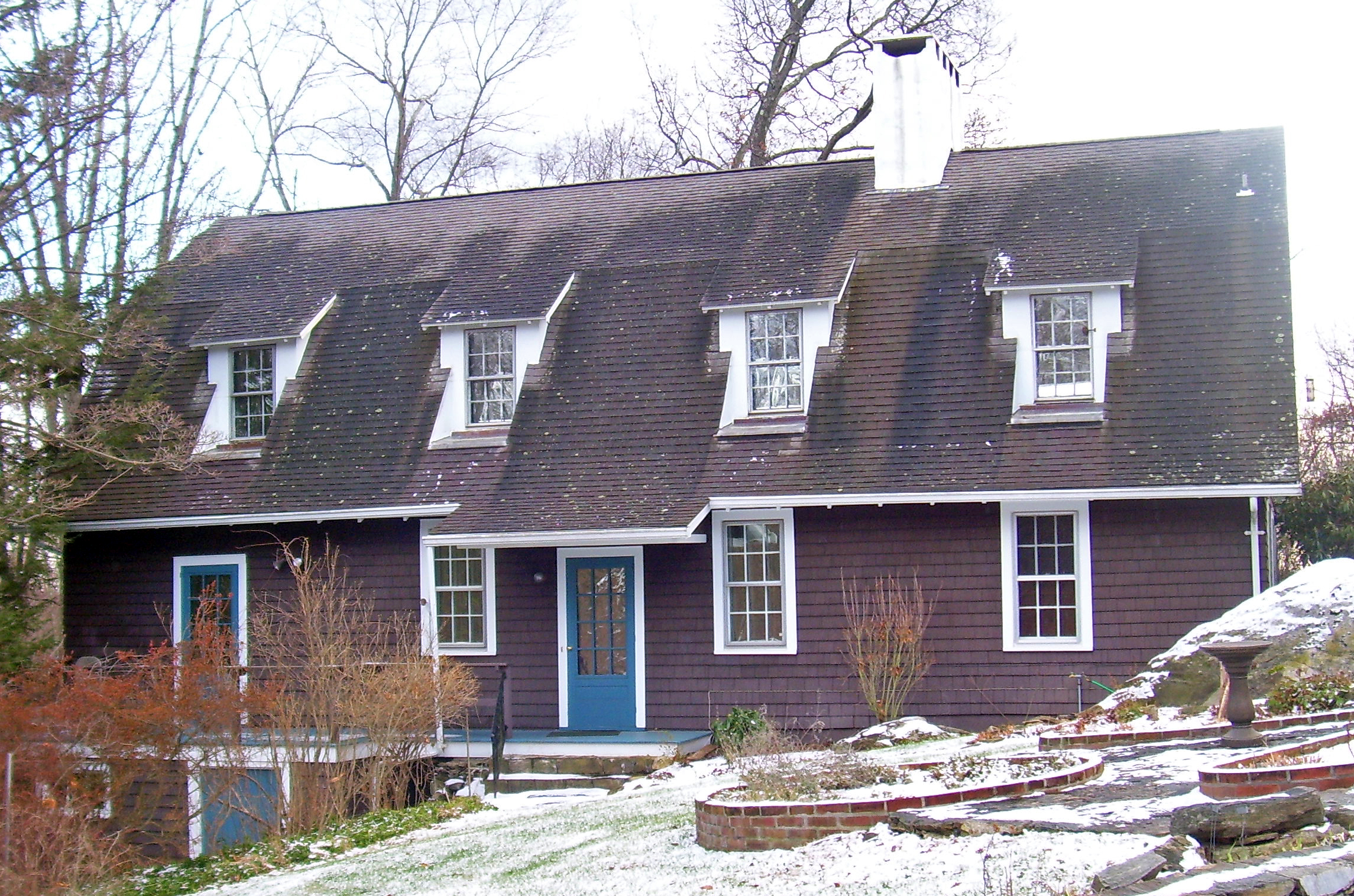
Stepping Stones in Bedford Hills, NY, where she co-founded Al-Anon.

They married on January 24, 1918, in the New York Swedenborgian Church. At that time, Bill was in the United States Army and they wanted to marry before he was sent to the Western Front. Lois completed an occupational therapy training programme through the War Department. During Bill's absence and on and off afterwards, Lois worked at the Walter Reed General Hospital in the 'shell shock' ward for veterans; as a physical therapist at the Brooklyn Navy Hospital and as an occupational therapist at Bellevue Hospital, New York in the 1920s. After his return, the couple hoped to start a family, but after ectopic pregnancies she was advised that pregnancy would be dangerous or impossible. Their attempts to adopt children were unsuccessful.

Her marriage to Bill W. began to be challenging due to the combination of a series of ectopic pregnancies and his drinking problem. Lois began to work on programs to help families of alcoholics after Bill had gone through rehabilitation at Towns Hospital in 1934 and cofounded Alcoholics Anonymous (AA) in 1935. The same 12-Steps of recovery used by AA were adopted by Al-Anon Al-Anon or Al-Anon Family Groups.

Her autobiography, Lois Remembers, was published in 1979.

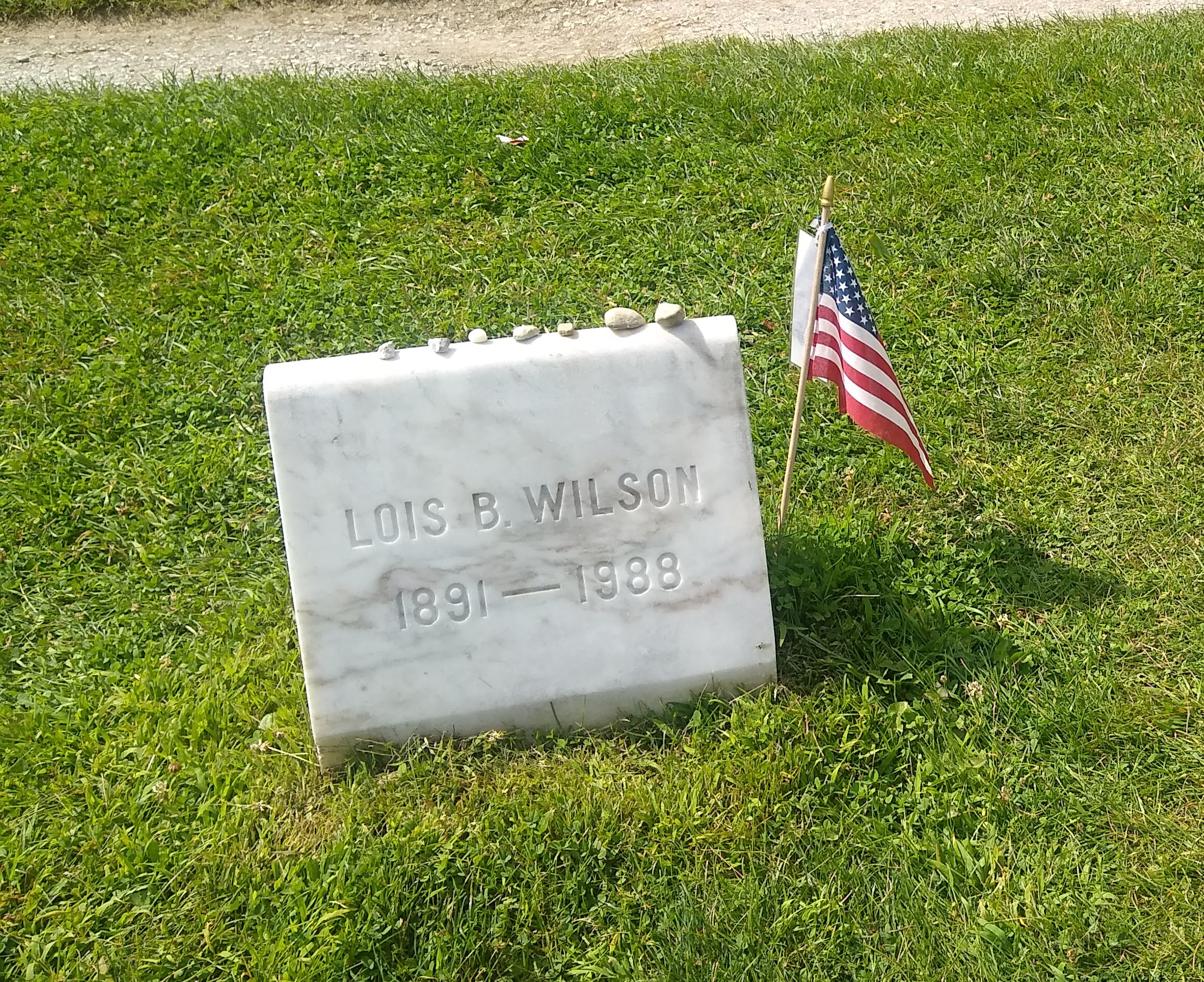
Lois W. headstone in the East Dorset Cemetery in East Dorset, Vermont

She died in 1988 at age 97, and is buried beside her husband in the East Dorset Cemetery in East Dorset, Vermont. Without children, she left Stepping Stones, the family home, gardens, archives and a writing studio (nicknamed "Wit's End" and "The Shack") on 8.5 acres in Bedford Hills, New York that she and Bill had owned since 1941, to the nonprofit, tax-exempt privately run Stepping Stones Foundation. She served as Stepping Stones Foundation's first president from 1979 to 1988 and led its programs to increase education, awareness and prevention of alcoholism. Stepping Stones historic site is on the National Register of Historic Places, was designated a National Historic Landmark in October 2012, and has become a tour destination for members of 12-step organizations, history buffs, and scholars and experts from many fields including those interested in alcoholism, history, spirituality, philosophy, pop culture, addiction, democracy and social movements.

Her memoir "Lois Remembers" is published by Al-Anon Family Groups.

== In popular culture ==
A 2010 made-for-TV movie based on her life, When Love Is Not Enough: The Lois Wilson Story featuring actress Winona Ryder as Lois Wilson, premiered on Hallmark Hall of Fame on CBS April 25, 2010. The film is based on the 2005 book of the same name written by William G. Borchert, author of the screen play for the 1989 film My Name Is Bill W., based on the story of Alcoholics Anonymous founder Bill Wilson, in which she was portrayed by JoBeth Williams.

She was also featured in a 2012 part documentary biographical film Bill W., directed by Dan Carracino and Kevin Hanlon.

An excerpt from a letter written by Lois W. and sent to her husband was sampled in the song "Adamord" by American ambient/drone duo Stars of the Lid on the album Music for Nitrous Oxide.

=== See also ===
- Al-Anon
- Stepping Stones, home of Lois and husband Bill W.
