= Barry Pepper =

Canadian-American actor

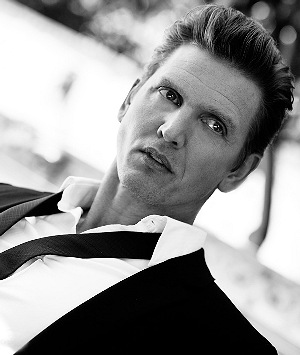
- Pepper in 2011
- Born: Barry Robert Pepper; April 4, 1970 (age 56); Campbell River, British Columbia, Canada
- Citizenship: Canada; United States
- Occupation: Actor
- Years active: 1992–present
- Spouse: Cindy Pepper
- Children: 1
- Website: www.barrypepper.com

Barry Robert Pepper (born April 4, 1970) is a Canadian-American actor. His best-known film roles include Private Daniel Jackson in Saving Private Ryan (1998), Corrections Officer Dean Stanton in The Green Mile (1999), Jonnie 'Goodboy' Tyler in Battlefield Earth (2000), Roger Maris in 61* (2001), he appeared in Jagged Edge music video Goodbye as a soldier (2001) Joseph L. Galloway in We Were Soldiers (2002), Charlie Halliday in The Snow Walker (2003), Mike Norton in The Three Burials of Melquiades Estrada (2005), Sergeant Michael Strank in Flags of Our Fathers (2006), Lucky Ned Pepper in True Grit (2010), DEA Agent Cooper in Snitch (2013), Vince in Maze Runner: The Scorch Trials (2015) and Maze Runner: The Death Cure (2018), and David Keller in Crawl (2019).

Among other accolades, Pepper has been nominated for three Screen Actors Guild Awards, a Genie Award, an Independent Spirit Award, and a Golden Globe Award. For his role as Robert F. Kennedy in the miniseries The Kennedys (2011), Pepper won the Primetime Emmy Award for Outstanding Lead Actor in a Limited or Anthology Series or Movie.

== Early life and education ==
Pepper was born the youngest of three boys in Campbell River, British Columbia, the son of a lumberjack. When he was five years old, his family set sail in a homemade yacht, navigating through the South Pacific islands for five years. He was educated through correspondence courses and public schools in Polynesia. His family encouraged him to entertain himself through improvisation and acting games while aboard the ship. When the family had finished their travels, they returned to Canada, settling on Denman Island, which his mother's family had called home for five generations. He graduated from Georges P. Vanier Secondary School in 1988. Pepper attended Camosun College after receiving a scholarship for artistic achievement, studying marketing and design. He later moved to Vancouver, where he enrolled in acting classes and worked at White Spot, where he was known for wearing a cow print jacket with a fringe. He spent four years studying, including at the Gastown Actors Studio, before landing a recurring role on the show Madison.

== Career ==
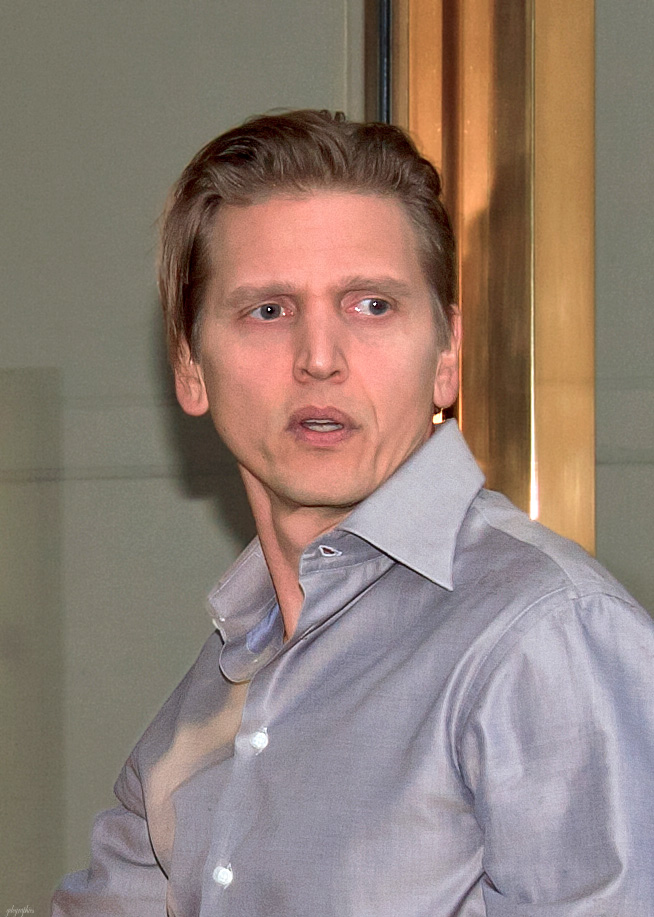
Pepper at the 2010 Toronto Film Festival

Pepper is perhaps best known for his role as the sniper Private Daniel Jackson in Saving Private Ryan (1998). He also played David Pratt in Enemy of the State (1998) with Will Smith, portrayed Corrections Officer Dean Stanton in The Green Mile (1999), depicted Roger Maris in Billy Crystal's HBO film 61* (2001), appeared as journalist Joseph L. Galloway in We Were Soldiers (2002), and appeared as Frank Slaughtery in Spike Lee's 25th Hour (2002). He played Charlie Halliday in The Snow Walker (2003), appeared as Dale Earnhardt in the ESPN produced film 3: The Dale Earnhardt Story (2004), played Mike Norton in The Three Burials of Melquiades Estrada (2005), portrayed Sergeant Michael Strank in Flags of Our Fathers (2006), and played Dan Morris in the film Seven Pounds (2008) again with Will Smith. He also had roles in Casino Jack (2010) and the Coen brothers' True Grit (2010). Pepper provided the voice for Alex Mercer, the protagonist of the video game Prototype (2009) and the voice for Corporal Dunn, a character in the video game Call of Duty: Modern Warfare 2 (2009).

Pepper won the Golden Raspberry Award for Worst Supporting Actor for his performance in Battlefield Earth: A Saga of the Year 3000 (2000). He has stated that, had he known in advance he was going to win the award, he would have gladly accepted it in person. He also appeared in Jagged Edge's music video for "Goodbye". In 2011, he starred as Robert F. Kennedy in the Canadian-American TV mini-series The Kennedys, for which he won the Primetime Emmy Award for Outstanding Lead Actor in a Limited or Anthology Series or Movie.

In 2013, Pepper played DEA Agent Cooper in Snitch. In 2015, he appeared in The Maze Runner sequel, Maze Runner: The Scorch Trials, as Vince, "a survivalist who is one of the last remaining soldiers of a legendary unit called the Right Arm". In 2018, Pepper reprised his role as Vince in Maze Runner: The Death Cure.

In 2019, Pepper starred as Dave Keller in the horror film Crawl.

== Personal life ==
Pepper is a naturalized United States citizen. He has one child, a daughter, with his wife Cindy.

== Filmography ==
=== Film ===
Year	Title	Role	Notes	Ref(s)
1996	Urban Safari	Rico		
1998	Firestorm	Packer		
1998	Saving Private Ryan	Private Daniel Jackson		
1998	Enemy of the State	NSA Agent David Pratt		
1999	The Green Mile	Dean Stanton		
2000	Battlefield Earth	Jonnie 'Goodboy' Tyler		
2000	We All Fall Down	John		
2001	Knockaround Guys	Matty DeMaret		
2002	We Were Soldiers	Joseph L. Galloway		
2002	25th Hour	Frank Slaughtery		
2003	The Snow Walker	Charlie Halliday		
2005	The Three Burials of Melquiades Estrada	Mike Norton		
2005	Ripley Under Ground	Tom Ripley		
2006	Flags of Our Fathers	Sgt. Michael Strank		
2006	Unknown	Rancher Shirt		
2007	Miami Drifters	Billy Masterson (voice)		
2008	Seven Pounds	Dan Morris		
2009	Princess Kaiulani	Lorrin A. Thurston		
2009	Like Dandelion Dust	'Rip' Porter		
2010	Casino Jack	Michael Scanlon		
2010	True Grit	"Lucky" Ned Pepper		
2013	Broken City	Jack Valliant		
2013	Snitch	DEA Agent Cooper		
2013	The Lone Ranger	Captain Jay Fuller		
2014	Kill the Messenger	Russell Dodson		
2015	Maze Runner: The Scorch Trials	Vince		
2016	Monster Trucks	Sheriff Rick Lovick		
2017	Bitter Harvest	Yaroslav		
2018	Maze Runner: The Death Cure	Vince		
2019	Crawl	Dave Keller		
2019	The Painted Bird	Mitka		
2019	Running with the Devil	The Boss		
2021	Trigger Point	Nicolas Shaw		
2021	Awake	Pastor		
2023	Bring Him to Me	Driver		
2026	Newborn	Hersh	Post-production	

=== Television ===
Year	Title	Role	Notes
1992	A Killer Among Friends	Mickey Turner	Television film
1993–1996	Madison	Mick Farleigh	16 episodes
1994	Neon Rider	Jason	Episode: "The Secret Life of Garret Tuggle"
1994	M.A.N.T.I.S.	Clayton Kirk	Episode: "Days of Rage"
1995	Johnny's Girl	Jimmy Zee	Television film
1995	Highlander: The Series	Michael Christian	Episode: "They Also Serve"
1995	Sliders	Skidd	Episode: "Summer of Love"
1995	Lonesome Dove: The Series	Cam	Episode: "Ties That Bind"
1996	Lonesome Dove: The Outlaw Years	Jake	Episode: "Partners"
1996	The Outer Limits	Tyson Ruddick	Episode: "The Heist"
1996	The Sentinel	Kurt Hessman	Episode: "Payback"
1996	Viper	Johnny Hodge	Episode: "White Fire"
1996	Titanic	Harold Bride	Miniseries
2001	61*	Roger Maris	Television film
2004	3: The Dale Earnhardt Story	Dale Earnhardt	Television film
2010	When Love Is Not Enough: The Lois Wilson Story	Bill W.	Television film
2011	The Kennedys	Robert F. Kennedy	8 episodes
2017	The Kennedys: After Camelot	Robert F. Kennedy	1 episode
2023	Lawmen: Bass Reeves	Esau Pierce	Main role
TBA	The Best of Us	Coach	Main role

=== Video games ===
Year	Title	Voice role	Notes
2009	Prototype	Alex Mercer	
2009	Call of Duty: Modern Warfare 2	CPL. Dunn	

== Awards and nominations ==
Year	Association	Category	Nominated work	Result
1999	Online Film Critics Society	Best Ensemble	Saving Private Ryan	Won
1999	Screen Actors Guild Awards	Outstanding Performance by a Cast in a Motion Picture	Saving Private Ryan	Nominated
2000	Screen Actors Guild Awards	Outstanding Performance by a Cast in a Motion Picture	The Green Mile	Nominated
2001	Golden Raspberry Awards	Worst Supporting Actor	Battlefield Earth	Won
2001	Primetime Emmy Awards	Primetime Emmy Award for Outstanding Lead Actor in a Miniseries or Movie	61*	Nominated
2002	Broadcast Film Critics Association	Best Actor in a Miniseries or Movie	61*	Nominated
2002	Golden Globe Awards	Best Actor – Miniseries or Television Film	61*	Nominated
2004	Genie Awards	Best Performance by an Actor in a Leading Role	The Snow Walker	Nominated
2004	Leo Awards	Best Male Performance in a Drama	The Snow Walker	Won
2004	Screen Actors Guild Awards	Outstanding Performance by a Male Actor in a Miniseries or Television Movie	3: The Dale Earnhardt Story	Nominated
2006	Independent Spirit Awards	Best Supporting Male	The Three Burials of Melquiades Estrada	Nominated
2010	Satellite Awards	Best Actor – Miniseries or Television Film	When Love Is Not Enough: The Lois Wilson Story	Nominated
2011	Gemini Awards	Outstanding Lead Actor in a Miniseries or Movie	The Kennedys	Won
2011	Primetime Emmy Awards	Primetime Emmy Award for Outstanding Lead Actor in a Miniseries or Movie	The Kennedys	Won
2011	Prism Awards	Best Performance in a Miniseries or Movie	When Love Is Not Enough: The Lois Wilson Story	Nominated
