= Bill W. (film) =

- Theatrical poster
- Directed by: Dan Carracino; Kevin Hanlon
- Written by: Dan Carracino; Patrick Gambuti Jr. Kevin Hanlon
- Produced by: Dan Carracino
- Starring: Bill Wilson (voice); Blake J. Evans
- Cinematography: Ryo Murakami
- Edited by: Patrick Gambuti Jr.
- Music by: Gil Talmi. Also includes original selections from Yo-Yo Ma’s Bach: The Cello Suites
- Distributed by: Page 124 Productions
- Release date: May 18, 2012
- Running time: 104 minutes
- Country: United States
- Language: English

Bill W. is a 2012 American biographical film directed by Dan Carracino and Kevin Hanlon, about William Griffith Wilson, the co-founder of Alcoholics Anonymous, and the first feature length documentary on Wilson.

== Synopsis ==
The film includes interviews with several recovering alcoholics who are photographed in dark shadows to maintain their anonymity, and also makes use of dramatic reenactments to visualize key events in Wilson's life. Blake J. Evans portrays Wilson in the film.

== Production ==
Making a film about the founder of an anonymous society presented the filmmakers with challenges. For example, by the time production began, there were few people still alive that knew Wilson, and it first appeared that there was very little visual material available on Wilson. The filmmakers were able to unearth little-seen archival footage and previously unpublished photographs of Wilson and the people in his life.

== Release ==
The film opened on limited release in New York City and Los Angeles on Friday, May 18, 2012.

Prior to its theatrical release, Bill W. screened at the Cleveland International Film Festival.

== PBS version and Emmy Award ==
An extensively re-edited and extended “director’s cut” version of the film (116 minutes) was aired on PBS starting in September 2016. This version of the film won an Emmy award in 2017.

== Recognition ==
=== Critical response ===
On the Rotten Tomatoes the film received a 78% based on reviews from 18 critics. On Metacritic it has a score of 78 based on 10 reviews. Ernest Hardy in his Village Voice review described the film as "a loving, exhaustive, warts-and-all look at the man who spent years battling his own alcoholism before a spiritual experience in the hospital set him on the course to help others."

Sheri Linden's review in the Los Angeles Times described Bill W. as "a thoroughly engrossing portrait of Wilson, his times and the visionary fellowship that is his legacy."

Roger Ebert gave Bill W. three stars out of four, calling it "an assembly of styles. It incorporates such film footage of Bill as is available, and then uses actors to re-enact chapters in his story."

== Partial cast ==
- Bill Wilson as himself (voice)
- Dr. Bob as himself (voice)
- Blake J. Evans as Bill Wilson
- Chris Gates as Dr. Bob
- Leila J. Babson as Anne Smith
- Julia Schell as Lois Wilson
- Laura Kauffmann as Martha Deane
- Tim Intravia as Edwin “Ebby T.” Thacher
- Rachel Lynn Jackson as Ruth Hock
- Dennis Lowell as Hank Parkhurst
- Ron Nagle as Bill's Grandfather
- Max Owens as Young Bill Wilson
- Lenore Pershing as Henrietta Seiberling
- Norman Shultz as Father Ed Dowling
- Francis Stallings as Kathleen Parkhurst
- Catherine Hogan as Waitress
- Bill Weeden as Financier
