= Al-Anon/Alateen =

Support group

Al-Anon Family Groups
- Founder: Lois W. Anne B.
- Type: 501(c)(3) Nonprofit corporation
- Purpose: Mutual support
- Headquarters: Virginia Beach, Virginia, U.S.
- Region served: Worldwide
- Website: al-anon.org

Al-Anon Family Groups, founded in 1951, is an international mutual aid organization for people who have been impacted by another person's alcoholism. In the organization's own words, Al-Anon is a "worldwide fellowship that offers a program of recovery for the families and friends of alcoholics, whether or not the alcoholic recognizes the existence of an alcohol-related problem or seeks help." Alateen "is part of the Al-Anon fellowship designed for the younger relatives and friends of alcoholics through the teen years".

== Background ==
Al-Anon defines itself as an independent fellowship with the stated purpose of helping relatives and friends of alcoholics. According to the organization, alcoholism is a family illness. Its "Preamble to the Twelve Steps" provides a general description:

The Al-Anon Family Groups are a fellowship of relatives and friends of alcoholics who share their experience, strength, and hope in order to solve their common problems. We believe alcoholism is a family illness and that changed attitudes can aid recovery.

Al-Anon is not allied with any sect, denomination, political entity, organization, or institution; does not engage in any controversy; neither endorses nor opposes any cause. There are no dues for membership. Al-Anon is self-supporting through its own voluntary contributions.

Al-Anon has but one purpose: to help families of alcoholics. We do this by practicing the Twelve Steps by welcoming and giving comfort to families of alcoholics, and by giving understanding and encouragement to the alcoholic.

Not an intervention program, Al-Anon does not have the stated primary purpose of arresting another's compulsive drinking. Members meet in groups. Meetings are usually small (five to twenty-five); in larger meetings, members often split into smaller groups after the opening readings so everyone has a chance to speak.

Many Al-Anon family group meetings begin with the "Suggested Al-Anon/Alateen Welcome", which starts:

We welcome you to the [Name of Group] Al-Anon Family Group and hope you will find in this fellowship the help and friendship we have been privileged to enjoy. We who live, or have lived, with the problem of alcoholism understand as perhaps few others can. We, too, were lonely and frustrated, but in Al-Anon we discover that no situation is really hopeless, and that it is possible for us to find contentment, and even happiness, whether the alcoholic is still drinking or not.

== History ==
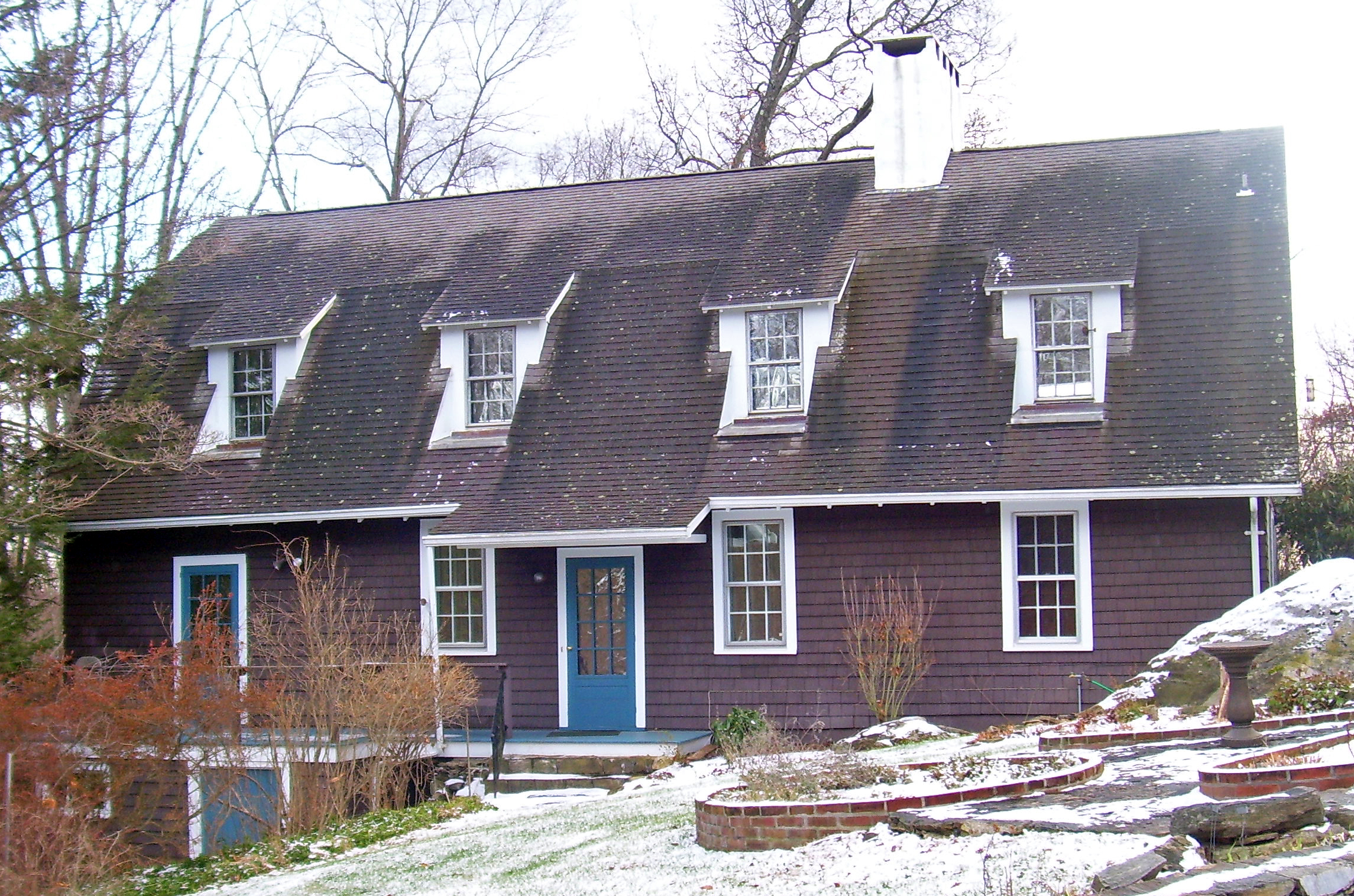
Stepping Stones in Katonah, NY, where Al-Anon was founded.

Al-Anon was co-founded in 1951, 16 years after the founding of Alcoholics Anonymous on June 10, 1935, by Anne B. and Lois W. (wife of AA co-founder Bill W.). Before the formation of Al-Anon, independent groups of families of alcoholics met. "Bill thought the[se] groups could be consolidated and that Lois should be the one to take it on."

Al-Anon adopted the Twelve Steps of Alcoholics Anonymous for their own use, changing the word "alcoholics" in the twelfth step to "others" ("we tried to carry this message to others"). Its name derives from the first parts of the words "Alcoholics Anonymous". Alateen, part of Al-Anon, began in California in 1957 when a teenager named Bob "joined with five other young people who had been affected by the alcoholism of a family member."

== Purpose ==
Although people commonly turn to Al-Anon for help in stopping another's drinking, the organization recognizes that the friends and families of alcoholics are often traumatized themselves and in need of emotional support and understanding. The Al-Anon program takes the focus away from the alcoholic and redirects it to the loved one. By working the 12 Steps, individuals can work on themselves and the ways that the family disease of alcoholism has changed their own thinking, opposed to the unsuccessful attempts of changing the alcoholic. The fellowship believes that after so long of living and loving an alcoholic, the loved ones take on blame, hurt, and the guilt of the alcoholic, in turn becoming ill too. The purpose is to have a community in which the loved one can share experience, strength, and hope aiding in solving common problems, not fixing the alcoholic.

According to Lois W.:

After a while I began to wonder why I was not as happy as I ought to be, since the one thing I had been yearning for all my married life [Bill's sobriety] had come to pass. Then one Sunday, Bill asked me if I was ready to go to the meeting with him. To my own astonishment as well as his, I burst forth with, "Damn your old meetings!" and threw a shoe as hard as I could.

This surprising display of temper over nothing pulled me up short and made me start to analyze my own attitudes ...

My life's purpose of sobering up Bill, which had made me feel desperately needed, had vanished ... I decided to strive for my own spiritual growth. I used the same principles as he did to learn how to change my attitudes ...

We began to learn ... that the partner of the alcoholic also needed to live by a spiritual program.

== Benefits ==
=== Problems ===
Al-Anon/Alateen literature focuses on problems common to family members and friends of alcoholics such as excessive care-taking, an inability to differentiate between love versus pity and loyalty to abusers, rather than the problems of the alcoholic. The organization acknowledges that members may join with low self-esteem, largely a side-effect of unrealistically overestimating their agency and control: attempting to control another person's drinking behavior and, when they fail, blaming themselves for the other person's behavior.

=== Improvement ===
Participation in Al-Anon has been associated with less personal blame by women who, as a whole, engage in more initial personal blame for the drinking than men. Family members of alcoholics begin to improve as they learn to recognize family pathology, assign responsibility for the pathology to a disease, forgive themselves, accept that they were adversely affected by the pathology and learn to accept their family members' shortcomings.

Al-Anon members are encouraged to keep the focus on themselves, rather than on the alcoholic. Although members believe that changed attitudes can aid recovery, they stress that one person did not cause, cannot cure and cannot control another person's alcohol-related choices and behaviors.

=== Treatment of alcoholism ===
Al-Anon's primary purpose is to help families and friends of alcoholics, rather than stopping alcoholism in others or assisting with interventions. When an alcoholic's spouse is active in Al-Anon and the alcoholic is active in AA, the alcoholic is more likely to be abstinent, marital happiness is more likely to be increased and parenting by both is more likely to improve. A 1999 clinical analysis of methods used by concerned significant others (CSOs) to encourage alcoholics to seek treatment indicated that Al-Anon participation was "mostly ineffective" towards this goal. The psychologists found community reinforcement approach and family training (CRAFT) "significantly more" effective than Al-Anon participation in arresting alcoholism in others.

== Demographics ==
In 2015, Al-Anon Family Groups published its 2015 Member Survey Results of demographic and other information from Al-Anon members in Canada and the United States Of the 8,517 respondents, 93 percent identified as white, 83 percent as female and 61 percent as married. Twelve percent of the respondents had children under age 18 at home, while "80 percent of respondents have been in a romantic relationship involving an alcoholic partner". And one side finding was that "40 percent of respondents initially joined Al-Anon because a person with a drug problem was negatively affecting their lives".

For the 2006 Alateen Member Survey, conducted in the U.S., 139 Alateen members responded. Sixty-five percent of the respondents were female, 35 percent were male, 72 percent were white and 20 percent spoke Spanish fluently. The respondents' average age was 14.

== Structure ==
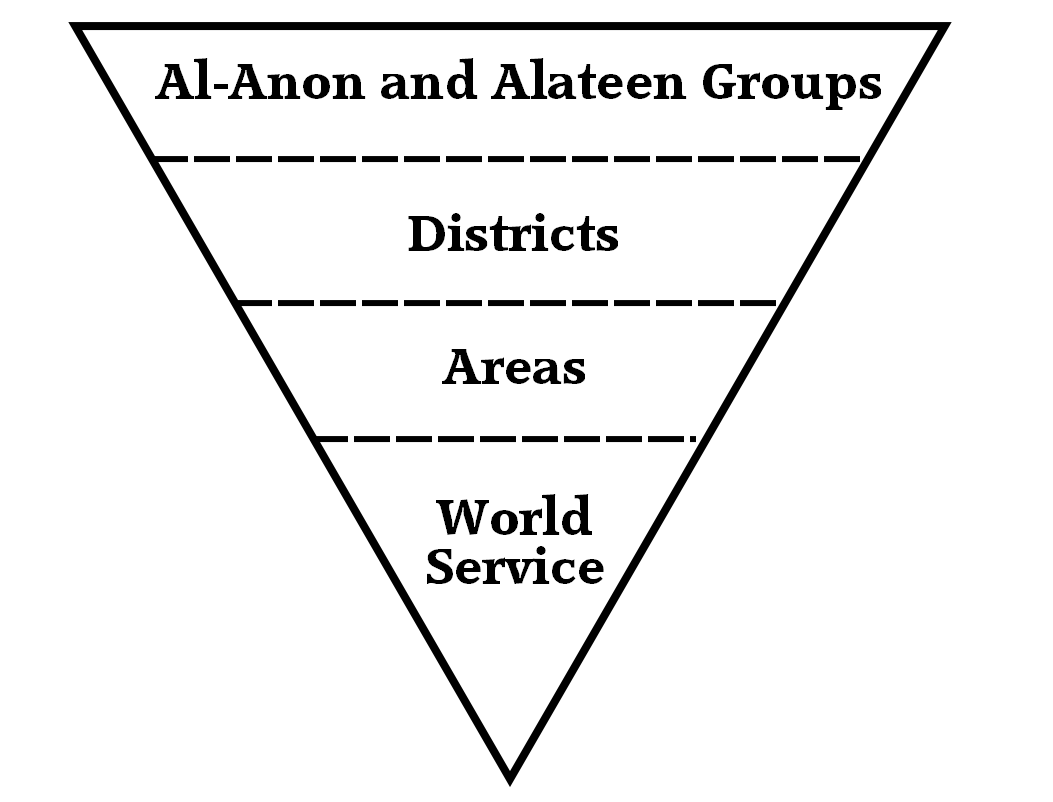
Al-Anon/Alateen organizational structure

The structure of Al-Anon Family Groups may be depicted as an inverted pyramid, with the organization's headquarters (the World Service Office) at the bottom and the "autonomous" groups at the top.

=== Groups ===
Al-Anon and Alateen members meet in Groups for fellowship and support. Each Group may elect a Group Representative (GR) to represent a group at District meetings.

=== Districts ===
Al-Anon and Alateen Groups' Group Representatives (GRs) attend District meetings. At these meetings they discuss service activities, Group issues (their primary purpose being to be a forum for Groups) and information from their Area and the World Service Office (WSO) of Al-Anon and Alateen, with GRs having voting privileges. A District may host regular events, such as workshops and speaker meetings, for the local fellowship.

=== Areas ===
An Area comprises several Districts. (For example, Texas is divided into two Al-Anon and Alateen Areas, East and West. Each Texas Area has about a dozen Al-Anon and Alateen Districts, for a total of about 24 in the state.) Each Area has regular meetings (known as Assemblies) where Group Representatives (GRs) meet and vote on issues impacting that Area, host workshops and speakers and get Area information to bring back to their Groups.

=== World Service ===
At Area Assembly, GRs elect a Delegate to the annual World Service Conference (WSC) (aka "The Conference"). The WSC meets annually to interface with the World Service Office (WSO), which is managed by administrators and overseen by the Board of Trustees (who meet more regularly themselves).

=== Democracy and accountability ===
Al-Anon promotes democracy and accountability. According to one of its General Warranties of the Conference, "That though the Conference serves Al-Anon it shall never perform any act of government; and that like the fellowship of Al-Anon Family Groups which it serves, it shall always remain democratic in thought and action." Another states "That no Conference member shall be placed in unqualified authority over other members."

According to Tradition Two of Al-Anon's Twelve Traditions: "Our leaders are but trusted servants—they do not govern." Tradition Nine says: "Our groups, as such, ought never be organized; but we may create service boards or committees directly responsible to those they serve." Districts and Areas are directly responsible to the Groups.

The World Service Office (WSO) is accountable to the World Service Conference (WSC). The WSC is responsible to the Areas through elected Delegates and ultimately responsible to the Groups. According to Concept One of Al-Anon's Twelve Concepts of Service: "The ultimate responsibility and authority for Al-Anon world services belongs to the Al-Anon Groups."

== In popular culture ==
The 1994 film When a Man Loves a Woman "...confronts the realities of substance abuse as it affects all members of one family with an alcoholic at its center." The alcoholic is played by Meg Ryan and her husband, who makes his way to an Al-Anon meeting, is played by Andy García. The hosts of Beyond Belief Sobriety discuss the film in a 2019 podcast episode.

== See also ==
- Adult Children of Alcoholics & Dysfunctional Families
- Alcoholism in family systems
- Community Reinforcement and Family Training (CRAFT)
- List of twelve-step groups
- Nar-Anon
- National Association for Children of Alcoholics
