= Stepping Stones (house) =

Historic house in New York, United States

- U.S. National Register of Historic Places
- U.S. National Historic Landmark
- New York State Register of Historic Places
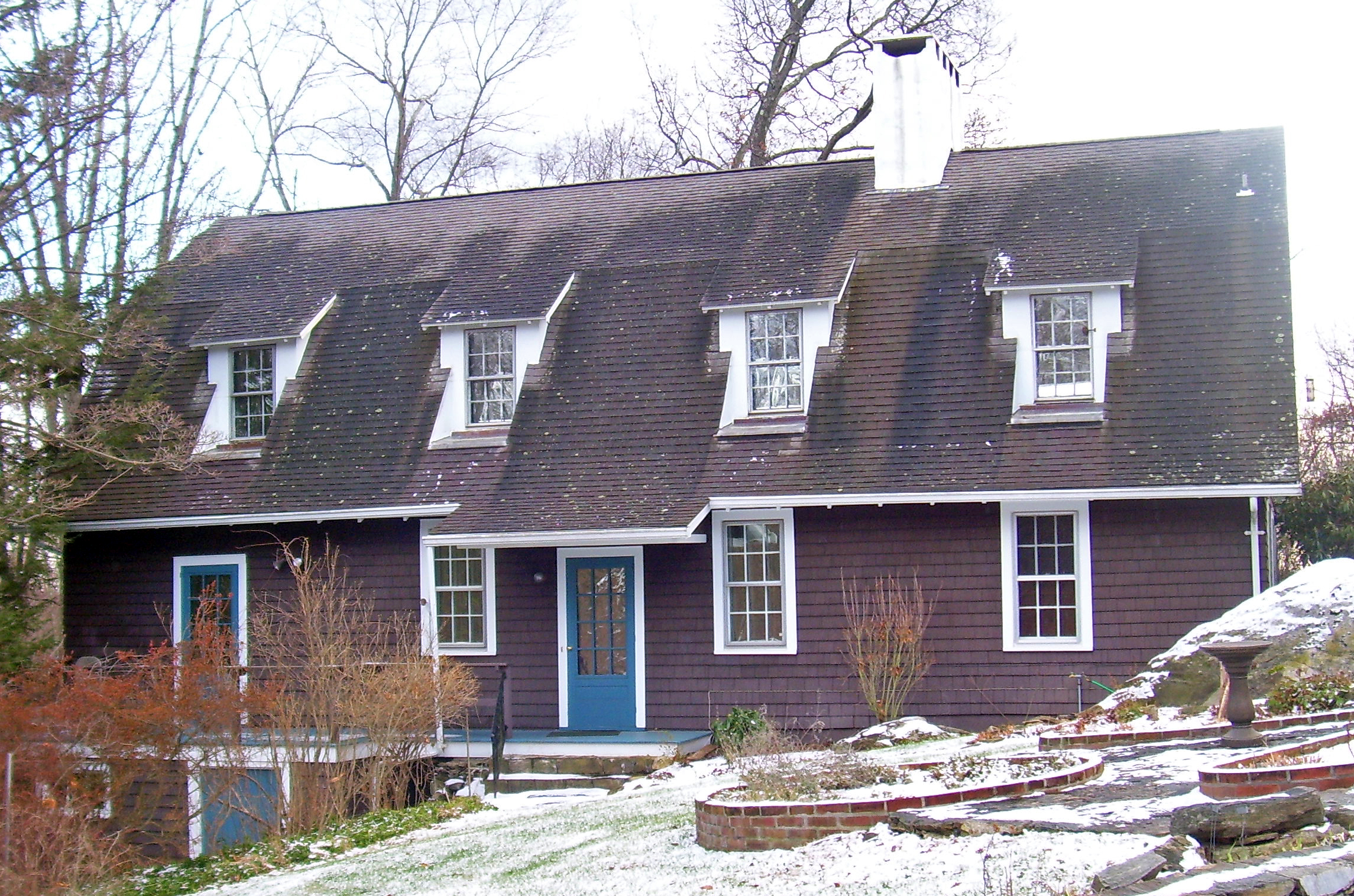
- North elevation, 2008

- Location within New York Location within the United States
- Interactive map showing the location of Stepping Stones
- Location: Katonah, NY
- Nearest city: Peekskill
- Coordinates: 41°14′48″N 73°42′3″W
- Area: 8 acres (3.2 ha)
- Built: 1920
- Architectural style: Dutch Colonial Revival
- NRHP reference No.: 04000705
- NYSRHP No.: 11901.000307

Significant dates
- Added to NRHP: July 16, 2004
- Designated NHL: October 16, 2012
- Designated NYSRHP: April 9, 2004

Stepping Stones is the historic home of Alcoholics Anonymous co-founder Bill Wilson (Bill W.) and his wife, co-founder of Al-Anon/Alateen Lois Wilson (Lois W.), in Bedford Hills, New York. The historic site features their house (a Dutch Colonial Revival structure from 1920); Bill W.'s writing studio, nicknamed "Wit's End"; approximately 15,000 objects (furniture, memorabilia, etc.) left by the Wilsons; a water pump house; the original one-car garage; a two-car garage and Welcome Center with an orientation display highlighting some of the 100,000 items in the Stepping Stones Archives; a flower garden; a community vegetable garden; and more. Lois left the property to The Stepping Stones Foundation - the nonprofit, tax-exempt organization that she founded in 1979. Since Mrs. Wilson's death in 1988 the Stepping Stones Foundation has maintained and preserved the site with the help of friends, and has offered on-site tours by reservation and off-site educational programs.

The house at 62 Oak Road, Katonah, New York is on the state and National Register of Historic Places listings in Westchester County, New York.

The New York Times quoted a former executive director of the site:

We always say it’s not a successful tour unless at least one person cries.

In 2012 it was designated a National Historic Landmark.

== History ==
The Wilsons bought the house on 1.7 acres in 1941 more than five years after Bill W. took his last drink in December 1934. Lois Wilson later co-founded Al-Anon there.

The desk on which Bill wrote much of the book Alcoholics Anonymous ("The Big Book", the principal text of A.A.) resides at "Wit's End," the office retreat he built out of cinder block with a friend on the property. Bill, after moving to Stepping Stones, wrote correspondence, Grapevine magazine articles, speeches, and three more books at the desk: The 12 Steps and 12 Traditions, As Bill Sees It, and AA Comes of Age.

The kitchen table Bill mentions in several of his accounts of his meeting with Ebby Thacher at Bill's former home in 182 Clinton Street, Brooklyn is also on view. The memorabilia display created in the mid-1900s by Lois herself includes a letter from Carl Jung to Bill Wilson, and a photograph of President Richard Nixon, receiving the millionth copy of the Big Book.

Bill died in 1971 and Lois died in 1988. The Wilsons did not have children. Their property was turned over to the Stepping Stones Foundation which maintains it and conducts the tours and presentations. In 2007, New York State Office of Parks, Recreation and Historic Preservation, added Stepping Stones to its new Women's Heritage Trail, in recognition of Lois. Every June (on the first Saturday), as per a tradition started by the Wilsons in 1952, hundreds of A.A. and Al-Anon members arrive for the Annual Stepping Stones Lois Family Groups Picnic, which is still a free event but requires tickets.

== See also ==
- List of National Historic Landmarks in New York
- National Register of Historic Places listings in northern Westchester County, New York
- Dr. Robert Smith House, Akron, Ohio
- Bill Wilson House, East Dorset, Vermont
