= Bill W. =

Founder of Alcoholics Anonymous (1895–1971)

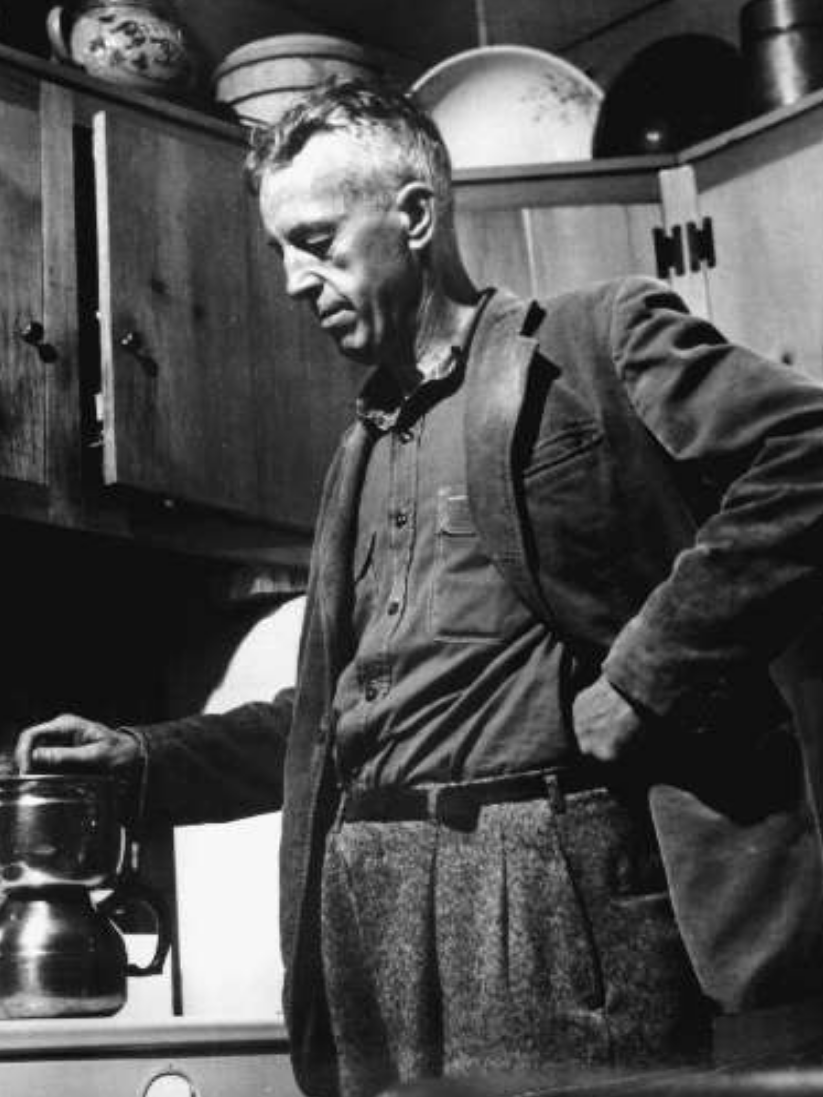
- Wilson, date unknown
- Born: William Griffith Wilson; November 26, 1895; East Dorset, Vermont, U.S.
- Died: January 24, 1971 (aged 75); Miami, Florida, U.S.
- Resting place: East Dorset Cemetery, East Dorset, Vermont; 43.216638°N 73.015148°W
- Education: Norwich University
- Occupations: Salesman, military officer, activist
- Known for: Co-founding Alcoholics Anonymous
- Spouse: Lois W. (m. 1918)
- Military career
- Allegiance: United States
- Branch: United States Army
- Years: 1916–1918
- Rank: Second lieutenant
- Unit: Vermont National Guard
- Conflicts: Pancho Villa Expedition; World War I

William Griffith Wilson (November 26, 1895 – January 24, 1971), also known as Bill Wilson or Bill W., was an American businessman who co-conceived and co-founded Alcoholics Anonymous (AA), with fellow co-founder Bob Smith.

AA is an international mutual aid fellowship with about two million members worldwide belonging to AA groups, associations, organizations, cooperatives, and fellowships of alcoholics helping other alcoholics achieve and maintain sobriety. Following AA's Twelfth Tradition of anonymity, within the organization Wilson is commonly known as "Bill W." or "Bill". After his death, with his prior written permission, his full name was included in obituaries.

Wilson's sobriety from alcohol, which he maintained until his death, began December 11, 1934. In 1955, he turned over control of AA to a board of trustees. He died in 1971, and in 1999 Time listed him as "Bill W.: The Healer" in the Time 100: The Most Important People of the Century.

== Early life ==
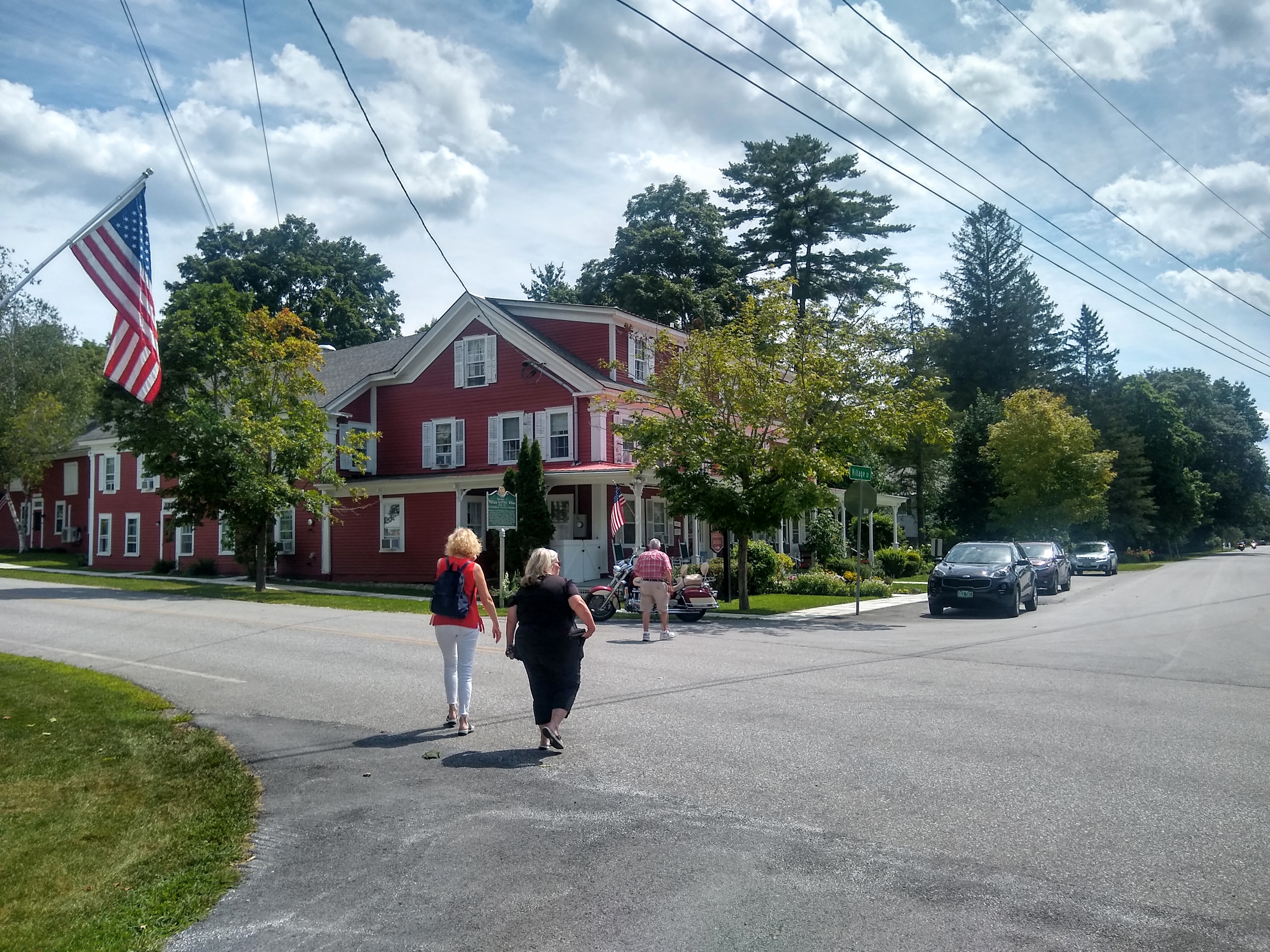
Bill Wilson's birthplace in East Dorset, Vermont

Wilson was born on November 26, 1895, in East Dorset, Vermont, the son of Emily (née Griffith) and Gilman Barrows Wilson. He was born at his parents' home and business, the Mount Aeolus Inn and Tavern. His sister, Dorothy, was born in 1898. His paternal grandfather, William C. Wilson, a hotelier and second-generation marble worker, was an alcoholic. Influenced by the preaching of an itinerant evangelist, some weeks before, William C. Wilson climbed to the top of Mount Aeolus, had a spiritual experience and quit drinking.

Wilson's parents divorced in 1906. His father left for western Canada, and his mother left soon after to study osteopathic medicine in Massachusetts. He and his sister, abandoned by their parents, were raised by their maternal grandparents, Gardner Fayette Griffith and Ella (née Brock).

By 1908, Wilson had met Mark Whalon, a fellow East Dorset resident who was nine years his senior. Whalon became Wilson's closest childhood friend, and introduced him to the world of ideas. Whalon continued to be a confidant, counselor, and emotional support to Wilson, even after Wilson became world famous, and as of Whalon's death in 1956 was still Wilson's best friend. Wilson later wrote of him, "He was a sort of uncle or father to me."

Wilson became the captain of his high school's football team, and the principal violinist in its orchestra. He dealt with a serious bout of depression at the age of 17, following the death of his first love, Bertha Bamford, who died of complications from surgery.

== Marriage, work, and alcoholism ==
Wilson met his future wife Lois Burnham during the summer of 1913 while sailing on Vermont's Emerald Lake; two years later, the couple became engaged. He entered Norwich University, but depression and panic attacks forced him to leave during his second semester. The next year he returned, but he was soon suspended with a group of students involved in a hazing incident. No one would take responsibility, and no one would identify the perpetrators, so the entire class was punished.

Pancho Villa's incursion into the U.S. in June 1916 resulted in Wilson's class being mobilized as part of the Vermont National Guard, and he was reinstated to serve. The following year he was commissioned as an artillery officer. During military training in Massachusetts, the young officers were often invited to dinner by the locals, and Wilson had his first drink, a glass of beer with little effect. A few weeks later at another dinner party held at the Joseph Grinnell Mansion in New Bedford, Massachusetts, he drank some Bronx cocktails and felt at ease with the guests and liberated from his awkward shyness. "I had found the elixir of life", he wrote. "Even that first evening I got thoroughly drunk, and within the next time or two I passed out completely. But as everyone drank hard, not too much was made of that."

Wilson married Burnham on January 24, 1918, just before he left to serve in World War I in France as a 2nd lieutenant in the Coast Artillery. After his military service, he returned to live with his wife in New York. He failed to graduate from law school because he was too drunk to pick up his diploma. Wilson became a stock speculator and had success traveling the country with his wife, evaluating companies for potential investors. During these trips, Lois had a hidden agenda: she hoped that the travel would keep Wilson from drinking. However, Wilson's constant drinking made business impossible and ruined his reputation.

In 1933, Wilson was committed to the Charles B. Towns Hospital for Drug and Alcohol Addictions in New York City four times under the care of William Duncan Silkworth. Silkworth's theory was that alcoholism was a matter of both physical and mental lack of control: a physical "allergy" resulting in a compulsion or physical inability to stop drinking once started, and a mental obsession (craving to take one first drink again). Wilson gained hope from Silkworth's assertion that alcoholism was a mental and medical condition, but even that knowledge could not help him. He was eventually told that he would either die from his alcoholism or have to be locked up permanently due to Wernicke encephalopathy (commonly referred to as "wet brain").

== Formation of Alcoholics Anonymous ==
In November 1934, Wilson was visited by an old drinking companion, Ebby Thacher. Wilson was astounded to find Thacher had been sober for weeks under the guidance of the evangelical Christian Oxford Group. Wilson took some interest in the group, but shortly after Thacher's visit, he was again admitted to Towns Hospital to recover from a bout of drinking. This was his fourth and last stay at Towns under Silkworth's care and he showed signs of delirium tremens. There, Bill W had a "White Light" spiritual experience and quit drinking. Earlier that evening, Thacher had visited and tried to persuade him to turn himself over to the care of a Christian deity who would liberate him from alcohol. He was also given belladonna, which causes hallucinations. According to Wilson, while lying in bed depressed and despairing, he cried out, "I'll do anything! Anything at all! If there be a God, let Him show Himself!". He said that in his mind's eye, that he was on a mountain and that a wind not of air but of spirit was blowing. Then he realised he was a free man. He then had the sensation of a bright light, a feeling of ecstasy, and a new serenity. He never drank again for the rest of his life. Wilson described his experience to Silkworth, who told him, "Something has happened to you I don't understand. But you had better hang on to it".

Wilson joined the Oxford Group and tried to help other alcoholics. They did not get sober, but Wilson kept sober himself. During a failed business trip to Akron, Ohio, Wilson was tempted to drink again and decided that to remain sober he needed to help another alcoholic. He called phone numbers in a church directory and eventually secured an introduction to Bob Smith, an alcoholic Oxford Group member. Wilson explained Silkworth's theory that alcoholics suffer from a physical allergy and a mental obsession. Wilson shared that the only way he was able to stay sober was through having had a spiritual experience. Smith was familiar with the tenets of the Oxford Group, and upon hearing of Wilson's experience, "began to pursue the spiritual remedy for his malady with a willingness that he had never before been able to muster. After a brief relapse, he sobered, never to drink again..." Wilson and Smith began working with other alcoholics. After that summer in Akron, Wilson returned to New York where he began having success helping alcoholics in what they called "a nameless squad of drunks" in an Oxford Group there.

In 1938, after about 100 alcoholics in Akron and New York had become sober, the 'fellowship' decided to promote its program of recovery through the publication of a book, for which Wilson was chosen as primary author. The book was given the title Alcoholics Anonymous and included the list of suggested activities for spiritual growth known as the Twelve Steps. The movement itself took on the name of the book. Bill incorporated the principles of nine of the Twelve Traditions, (a set of spiritual guidelines to ensure the survival of individual AA groups) in his foreword to the original edition; later, Traditions One, Two, and Ten were clearly specified when all twelve statements were published. The AA general service conference of 1955 was a landmark event for Wilson in which he turned over the leadership of the maturing organization to an elected board.

In 1939, Wilson and Marty Mann visited High Watch Farm in Kent, CT. They would go on to found what is now High Watch Recovery Center, the world's first alcohol and addiction recovery center founded on Twelve Step principles.

Wilson strongly advocated that AA groups have not the "slightest reform or political complexion". In 1946, he wrote "No AA group or members should ever, in such a way as to implicate AA, express any opinion on outside controversial issues – particularly those of politics, alcohol reform or sectarian religion. The Alcoholics Anonymous groups oppose no one. Concerning such matters they can express no views whatever." Reworded, this became AA's "Tradition 10".

== Final years ==
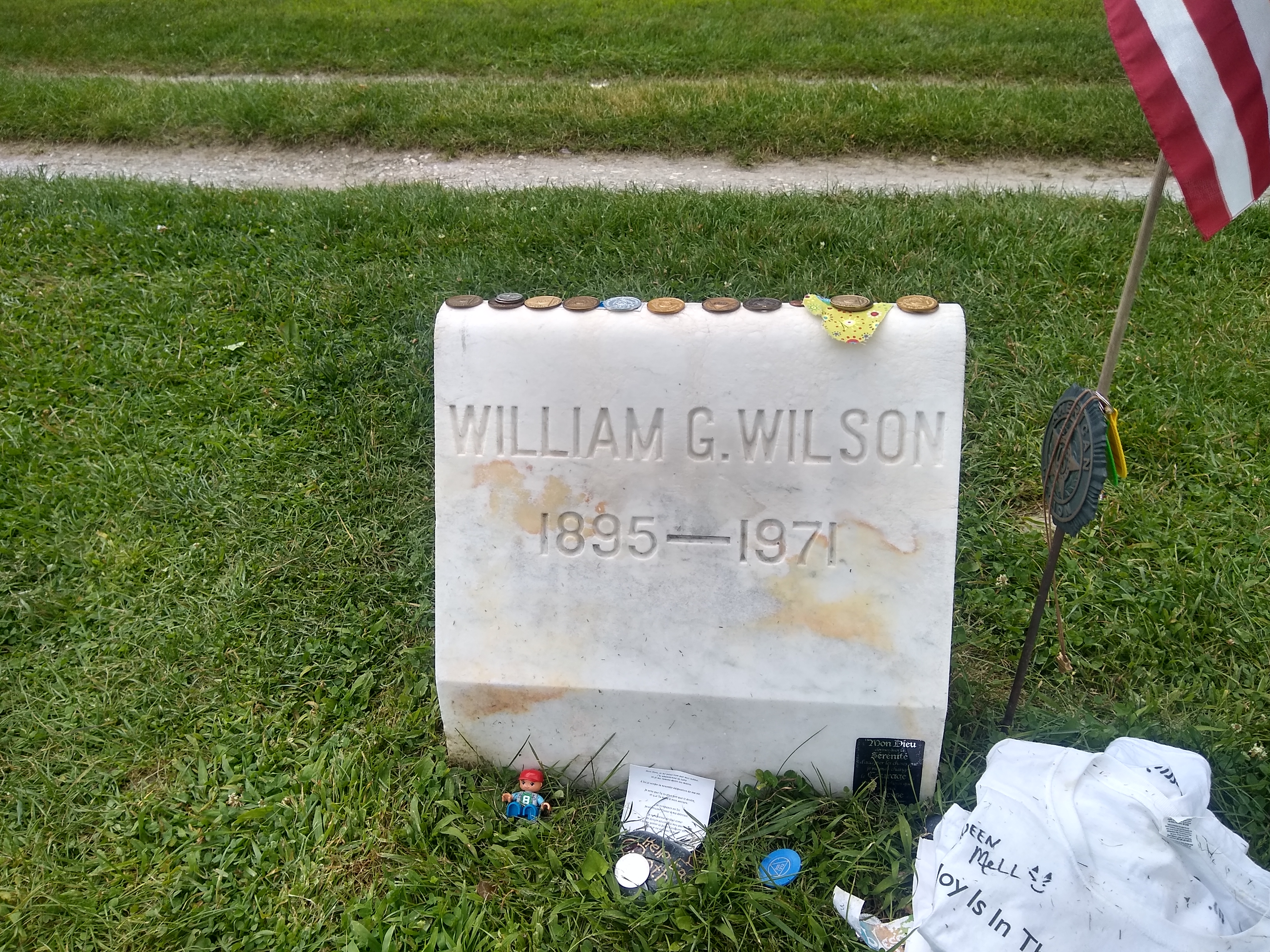
Bill Wilson's headstone in the East Dorset Cemetery

During the last years of his life, Wilson rarely attended AA meetings to avoid being asked to speak as the co-founder rather than as an alcoholic. A heavy smoker, Wilson eventually suffered from emphysema and later pneumonia. He continued to smoke while dependent on an oxygen tank in the late 1960s. While notes written by nurse James Dannenberg say that Bill Wilson asked for whiskey four times (December 25, 1970, January 2, 1971, January 8, 1971, and January 14, 1971) in his final month of living, he drank no alcohol for the last 36 years of his life.

== Personal life ==
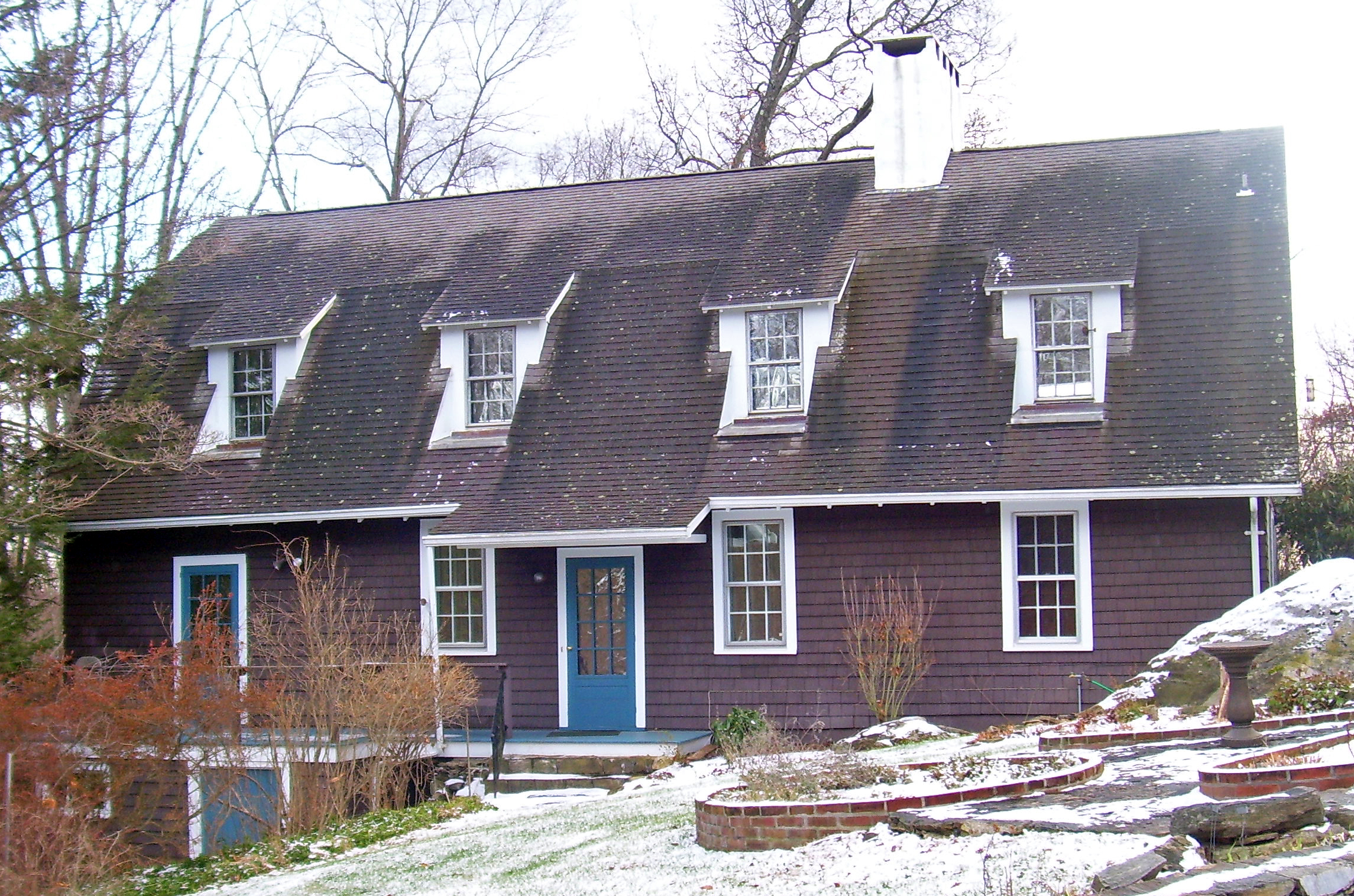
Stepping Stones, the Wilsons' home in later life in Bedford Hills, New York, now a museum

Wilson met his future wife, Lois Burnham, during the summer of 1913 while sailing on Vermont's Emerald Lake; two years later, the couple became engaged. They were married in the Swedenborgian Church (Church of the New Jerusalem) in Brooklyn, New York on January 24, 1918, just before Bill was shipped abroad to serve in the First World War as a young officer.

Personal letters between Wilson and his wife Lois spanning a period of more than 60 years are kept in the archives at Stepping Stones, their former home in Bedford Hills, New York, and in AA's General Service Office archives in New York.

Francis Hartigan, biographer of Bill Wilson and personal secretary to Lois Wilson in her later years, wrote that in the mid-1950s Bill began a fifteen-year affair with Helen Wynn, a woman 18 years his junior whom he met through AA. Hartigan also asserts that this relationship was preceded by other marital infidelities. Wilson arranged in 1963 to leave 10% of his book royalties to Helen Wynn, and the rest to his wife Lois. Historian Ernest Kurtz was skeptical of the veracity of the reports of Wilson's womanizing. He judged that the reports were traceable to a single person, Tom Powers, a formerly close friend of Wilson's with whom he had a falling-out in the mid-1950s.

Wilson’s biographer wrote that “Bill was compulsive, given to emotional extremes…Even after he stopped drinking, he was still a heavy consumer of cigarettes and coffee. He had a sweet tooth, a large appetite for sex, and a major enthusiasm for LSD and, later, for niacin.”

Having had lapses of depression all his life, between 1956 and some time in the 1960s, Wilson used LSD in medically supervised experiments with Betty Eisner, Gerald Heard, and Aldous Huxley. According to Wilson, his first LSD session allowed him to re-experience a spontaneous spiritual experience he had had years before, in 1934, which had helped him to overcome his own alcoholism. He thought he might have found something that could make a difference to the lives of some who still suffered. He felt that usage of LSD in a carefully controlled, structured setting might be beneficial for some recovering alcoholics. However, he felt this method should only be attempted by individuals with well-developed super-egos. Most AAs were strongly opposed to his experimenting with a mind-altering substance, and Wilson never publicly advocated for other AA members to use LSD.

In 1960 Wilson met Abram Hoffer and learned about the potential mood-stabilizing effects of niacin. Wilson was impressed with experiments indicating that alcoholics who were given niacin had a better sobriety rate, and he began to see niacin "as completing the third leg in the stool, the physical to complement the spiritual and the emotional". Wilson also believed that niacin had given him relief from depression, and he promoted the vitamin within the AA community and with the National Institute of Mental Health as a treatment for schizophrenia. However, Wilson created a major furor in AA because he used the AA office and letterhead in this promotion.

For Wilson, spiritualism was a lifelong interest. One of his letters to adviser Father Dowling suggests that while Wilson was working on his book Twelve Steps and Twelve Traditions, he felt that spirits were helping him, in particular a 15th-century monk named Boniface. Despite his conviction that he had evidence for the reality of the spirit world, Wilson chose not to share this with AA. However, his practices still created controversy within the AA membership. Wilson and his wife continued with their unusual practices in spite of the misgivings of many AA members. In their house they had a "spook room" where they would invite guests to participate in séances using a Ouija board.

== Legacy ==
In 2021, Alcoholics Anonymous reported having over 120,000 registered local groups and over 1.9 million active members worldwide.

Wilson has often been described as having loved being the center of attention, but after the AA principle of anonymity had become established, he refused an honorary degree from Yale University and refused to allow his picture, even from the back, on the cover of Time.

Aldous Huxley called him "the greatest social architect of our century", and Time magazine named Wilson to their "Time 100 List of The Most Important People of the 20th Century". Wilson's self-description was a man who, "because of his bitter experience, discovered, slowly and through a conversion experience, a system of behavior and a series of actions that work for alcoholics who want to stop drinking."

Biographer Susan Cheever wrote in My Name Is Bill, "Bill Wilson never held himself up as a model: he only hoped to help other people by sharing his own experience, strength and hope. He insisted again and again that he was just an ordinary man".

Wilson bought a house that he and Lois called Stepping Stones on an 8-acre (3 ha) estate in Bedford Hills, New York, in 1941, and he lived there with Lois until he died in 1971. After Lois died in 1988, the house was opened for tours and is now on the National Register of Historic Places; it was designated a National Historic Landmark in 2012.

== In popular culture ==
Wilson, his wife Lois, and the formation of AA, have been the subject of numerous projects, including My Name Is Bill W., a 1989 CBS Hallmark Hall of Fame TV movie starring James Woods as Bill W. and James Garner as Bob Smith. Woods won an Emmy for his portrayal of Wilson. He was depicted in a 2010 TV movie based on Lois' life, When Love Is Not Enough: The Lois Wilson Story, adapted from a 2005 book of the same name written by William G. Borchert. The film starred Winona Ryder as Lois Wilson and Barry Pepper as Bill W. A 2012 documentary, Bill W., was directed by Dan Carracino and Kevin Hanlon.

The band El Ten Eleven's song "Thanks Bill" is dedicated to Bill W. since lead singer Kristian Dunn's wife got sober due to AA. He states "If she hadn't gotten sober we probably wouldn't be together, so that's my thank you to Bill Wilson who invented AA". In Michael Graubart's Sober Songs Vol. 1, the song "Hey, Hey, AA" references Bill's encounter with Ebby Thatcher which started him on the path to recovery and eventually the creation of Alcoholics Anonymous. The lyric reads, "Ebby T. comes strolling in. Bill says, 'Fine, you're a friend of mine. Don't mind if I drink my gin.'"

In the Stephen King book "Never Flinch" the serial killer - himself a recovering alcoholic - sends a letter to the police signed as Bill Wilson.

== Writings ==
- Alcoholics Anonymous
- Twelve Steps and Twelve Traditions
- A. A. Comes of Age
- A.A. Service Manual/Twelve Concepts for World Services
- As Bill Sees It
- A. A. Way of Life
- Bill W: My First 40 Years
- The Language of the Heart: Bill W.'s Grapevine Writings

== See also ==
- Bill W. and Dr. Bob (play)
- Jim Burwell
- Lucille Kahn
- Rowland Hazard III ("Rowland H")
- Substance use disorder - Addiction

== Sources and further reading ==
- The A.A. Service Manual combined with Twelve Concepts for World Service (PDF) (2015–2016 ed.). New York: Alcoholics Anonymous. 2015.
- Susan Cheever (2005). My Name is Bill, Bill Wilson: His Life and the Creation of Alcoholics Anonymous. New York: Simon & Schuster/ Washington Square Press. ISBN 978-0743405911.
- Alcoholics Anonymous. The Story of How Many Thousands of Men and Women Have Recovered from Alcoholism (4th ed.). New York: Alcoholics Anonymous. 2002. ISBN 1893007162. ('Big Book')
- Alcoholics Anonymous Comes Of Age. New York: Alcoholics Anonymous. 1957. ISBN 091685602X.
- As Bill Sees It. New York: Alcoholics Anonymous. 1967. ISBN 0916856038.
- B., Dick (2006). The Conversion of Bill W.: More on the Creator's Role in Early A.A.. Kihei, Hawaii: Paradise Research Publications, Inc. ISBN 1885803907.
- Bill W. (2000). My First 40 Years. An Autobiography by the Cofounder of Alcoholics Anonymous. Center City, Minnesota: Hazelden. ISBN 1568383738.
- Dr. Bob and the Good Oldtimers. New York: Alcoholics Anonymous. 1980. ISBN 0916856070. LCCN 80-65962.
- Hartigan, Francis (2000). Bill W. A Biography of Alcoholics Anonymous Cofounder Bill Wilson. New York: Thomas Dunne Books. ISBN 0312200560.
- Kurtz, Ernest (1979). Not-God: A History of Alcoholics Anonymous. Center City, Minnesota: Hazelden. ISBN 0894860658. LCCN 79-88264.
- Pass It On: The story of Bill Wilson and how the A.A. message reached the world. New York: Alcoholics Anonymous. 1984. ISBN 0916856127. LCCN 84-072766.
- Raphael, Matthew J. (2000). Bill W. and Mr. Wilson: The Legend and Life of A.A.'s Cofounder. Amherst, Massachusetts: University of Massachusetts Press. ISBN 1558492453.
- Thomsen, Robert (1975). Bill W. New York: Harper & Rowe. ISBN 0060142677.
- Twelve Steps and Twelve Traditions. New York: Alcoholics Anonymous. 1953. ISBN 0916856011.
- Faberman, J. & Geller, J. L. (January 2005). "My Name is Bill: Bill Wilson – His life and the Creation of Alcoholics Anonymous". Psychiatric Services. 56 (1): 117. doi:10.1176/appi.ps.56.1.117.
- Galanter, M. (May 2005). "Review of My Name Is Bill: Bill Wilson – His Life and the Creation of Alcoholics Anonymous". American Journal of Psychiatry. 162 (5): 1037–1038. doi:10.1176/appi.ajp.162.5.1037.
