= My Name Is Bill W. =

1989 film directed by Daniel Petrie

- My Name Is Bill W. video cover
- Genre: Drama
- Written by: William G. Borchert
- Directed by: Daniel Petrie
- Starring: James Woods; James Garner; JoBeth Williams
- Theme music composer: Laurence Rosenthal
- Original language: English

Production
- Executive producers: Peter K. Duchow; James Garner
- Producer: Daniel Petrie
- Production location: Richmond, Virginia
- Cinematography: Neil Roach
- Editors: Paul Rubell; John Wright
- Running time: 100 minutes
- Production companies: Warner Bros. Television; Garner-Duchow Productions; Hallmark Hall of Fame Productions

Original release
- Network: ABC
- Release: April 30, 1989

My Name Is Bill W. is a 1989 ABC Hallmark Hall of Fame made-for-television drama film directed by Daniel Petrie, starring James Woods, JoBeth Williams and James Garner. William G. Borchert, who wrote the film script for television, based it on the true story of William Griffith Wilson and Robert Holbrook Smith (the men respectively called "Bill W." and "Dr. Bob"), the co-founders of Alcoholics Anonymous. James Woods won an Emmy for his portrayal of Wilson.

== Plot ==
The movie details the true story of stockbroker William Griffith Wilson, a World War I veteran whose alcoholism ("drinking problem") becomes a serious addiction and causes him to lose his fortune in the stock market collapse of 1929. Wilson's career and his domestic life are in tatters when he meets Robert Holbrook Smith, also struggling with a drinking problem. The duo founded a support group that became the nucleus for the society Alcoholics Anonymous.

== Featured cast ==
Actor	Role
George Coe	Frank Shaw
James Garner	Robert Holbrook "Dr. Bob" Smith
Robert Harper	Jeremy Partlin
Joe Inscoe	Fred
Mark Joy	Guy Kolb
Gary Sinise	Ebby Thacher
Rick Warner	Bill Dotson
Fritz Weaver	Dr. Burnham
JoBeth Williams	Lois "Lo" Wilson
James Woods	William Griffith "Bill W." Wilson
Dalton Grey	Mike Davis stockbroker

== Awards and nominations ==
=== 1990 American Cinema Editors Awards (Eddies) ===
- Nominated – Best Edited Television Special: Paul Rubell, John Wright

=== 1990 American Society of Cinematographers ===
- Nominated – Outstanding Achievement in Cinematography in Movies of the Week/Pilots: Neil Roach

=== 1990 Directors Guild of America ===
- Nominated – Outstanding Directorial Achievement in Dramatic Specials: Daniel Petrie

=== 1989 Emmy Awards ===
- Won – Outstanding Lead Actor In A Miniseries Or Movie: James Woods
- Nominated – Outstanding Costumes For A Miniseries, Movie Or Special: April Ferry
- Nominated – Outstanding Directing For A Miniseries, Movie Or Dramatic Special: Daniel Petrie
- Nominated – Outstanding Television Movie: Peter K. Duchow, James Garner, Daniel Petrie
- Nominated – Outstanding Single-Camera Picture Editing For A Miniseries Or A Movie: Paul Rubell, John Wright
- Nominated – Outstanding Supporting Actor In A Miniseries Or A Movie: James Garner
- Nominated – Outstanding Writing For A Miniseries, Movie Or A Dramatic Special: William G. Borchert

=== 1990 Golden Globe Awards ===
- Nominated – Best Limited or Anthology Series
- Nominated – Best Actor - Miniseries or Television Film: James Woods

== See also ==
- History of Alcoholics Anonymous
