= Horses Healing Hearts =

Organization in South Florida

Horses Healing Hearts (HHH) is a 501(c)3 charitable organization located in South Florida, United States. This psychoeducational program helps children whose parents suffer from the disease of addiction. While providing a safe and nurturing environment to build self-esteem and confidence by working with horses, HHH equips children with the tools to change their lives and break the generational cycle of addiction. It was founded in 2009 by Lizabeth Olszewski.

Children who attend Horses Healing Hearts are given riding instruction and taught about the overall care of horses. With the assistance of volunteers, mentors, and host barns, children also take part in a curriculum-based group counseling session. Since its inception, the organization has grown and strategically aligned itself with respected high-profile equestrian ambassadors. HHH is funded by private and public grants, individual donations, and fundraising events, with its most notable being the White, White West Party.

== History ==
After she volunteered at an equine program for autistic and physically disabled children, Lizabeth Olszewski had the idea to start a similar program for the children of alcoholics and addicts, because of her background growing up in a turbulent and alcoholic home. Having no funds and only her personal horse, she searched the internet to see how other equine therapy programs operated. After finding "Horses In the Hood," a non-profit organization benefiting the inner-city community by providing lessons that teach skills and values associated with the care and riding of horses started by Kathy Kusner, Olszewski was inspired to replicate Kusner's program model by "partnering" with existing barns. In October 2009, HHH had its first two participants.

Since its inception in 2009, HHH has grown in size and reach. It offers six equine programs: the Children's Prevention Program, the Mentor Program, the Youth Emotional Healing Program, the Equine Therapy Individuals & Families Program, the Equine Therapy Recovery & Treatment Program, and Equine-Assisted Development for Business. Since 2014, HHH has helped over 6,300 adults and 490 families.

=== Host barns ===
- Carriage Hill, Delray Beach (2012–2015)
- Johnsons Folly Farm, Delray Beach (2009–present)
- Equestrian Center, Boynton Beach (2014–2016)

== Activities ==
Horses Healing Hearts uses the similarities between horses and children of alcoholics (COAs) to help the children relate to other beings. Horses are prey animals and are therefore hypervigilant to their surroundings and any potential dangers, much the same way that COAs must gauge the mood of an addicted parent to protect themselves. As a means of protecting their emotional well-being, COAs frequently suppress their voice and feelings and are cautious not to trust anyone. In time, if these repressed feelings are not addressed by preventive intervention, COAs often seek to numb these internal struggles with drugs or alcohol, thus continuing the familial history of addiction.

Horses Healing Hearts incorporates horses into the program to increase participants' social skills and connectivity. As herd animals, horses are naturally social and many even fear being alone. This makes horses a useful tool for COAs, as both the horse and the child seek connection with another living being. Horses are extremely perceptive to both external and internal conditions, and are able to pick up on the emotions of a person, whether that be excitement, fear, or confidence. The horse is an ideal animal to encourage and motivate COAs to connect and communicate with another living thing, both physically and emotionally. This allows the child to release suppressed emotions, as well as decrease their disconnect with others. As the children grow accustomed to the horses and the atmosphere, they eventually grow eager for each session and begin to form healthy bonds and relationships with both the horse and the volunteers, something which is challenging, if not impossible, to do in a home with addiction. HHH shows what "healthy" behavior looks like so the children have a model to emulate.

=== Mentorship ===
The mentorship program was created by Amanda Chaplin, a girl who first visited Horses Healing Hearts to volunteer with her mother. Chaplin developed the idea of a mentoring program in which young adults could serve as "big brothers and sisters" to incoming kids ("littles") and influence their lives by serving as positive mentors.

=== Vaulting ===
Vaulting is sometimes described as gymnastics and dance on horseback, which can be practiced both competitively or non-competitively. Vaulting develops both physical and mental health, since children are taught to completely trust the horse they are riding when performing vaulting routines. The vaulting program held by HHH consists of a team of children who practice on a wooden horse until they can afford to buy a horse for the program.

=== Equine-assisted psychotherapy ===
Equine-assisted psychotherapy (EAP) incorporates horses for mental and behavioral health therapy and personal development. Licensed therapists work with horse professionals to address treatment goals with clients and horses. Participants learn about themselves by interacting with horses and then discuss their feelings, behaviors, and patterns. EAP uses horses to engage with clients during ground activities that require the participant to apply certain skills, including nonverbal communication, assertiveness, creative thinking, problem-solving, leadership, and confidence. Horses help people to connect with their feelings, as horses are keenly aware of their surroundings and the intentions of those around them. HHH professionals are trained in the experiential and evidence-based model Equine Assisted Growth and Learning Association (EAGALA), which is used in 50 countries and has over 4,500 members. Through horses, EAGALA uses a team approach (focusing on ground activities) to address mental health and development needs of participants, which allows them to experiment and discover their own solutions.

Although HHH uses EAP with clients from various populations, they specialize in serving adults in recovery from substance use disorder. Since 2013, HHH has worked with over 5,000 clients from area treatment centers. Many clients comment that equine therapy was their most peaceful and enjoyable activity during treatment.

=== Equine-assisted learning ===
Equine-assisted learning (EAL) is similar to EAP, but uses horses to teach more broad concepts (communication, teamwork, problem resolution) related to individual development and group dynamics. HHH's staff has completed specialized EAGALA training related to offering Fortune 500 companies EAL as a training/staff development benefit. Executives from companies such as Walmart, ExxonMobil, and Target have participated in EAGALA EAL programs to improve their team performance.

== Community partners ==
HHH has held many fundraising events in conjunction with multiple South Florida Community partners. The nonprofit's annual event, the White, White, West Party, was introduced in 2011 to raise money and educate the public about equine therapy.

In 2012, Miss Florida Karina Brez chose HHH as her non-profit platform and shared its mission nationally as she competed in the Miss USA Pageant.

By 2013, Amanda Chaplin had started the HHH Big Brother Big Sister Mentoring Program which matches middle and high school-aged participants with mentors in undergraduate and graduate school.

HHH welcomed Olympic gold medalist Peter Wylde as their first Show Jumping Ambassador. Other professional athlete ambassadors have since joined to help support the mission, including Marco Bernal (dressage), Lisa Jacquin (silver medalist in jumping), Jeff Blake (polo), Stuart "Sugar" Erskine (polo), and Matt Coppolla (polo).

HHH was one of the only groups to intern with the Palm Beach County Sheriff's Office Mounted Unit. HHH received the Palm Beach Sheriff's Law Enforcement Trust Foundation Grant for multiple consecutive years.

In 2016, Quinton Aaron (star of the film The Blind Side), members of his foundation, and HHH collaborated to kick off Wellington's first Anti-Bullying Day. As a result of this collaboration, Wellington Mayor Bob Margolis and Florida State Attorney Dave Aronberg presented a proclamation to the community at Victoria McCullough's MIDA Farms estate, naming November 14, 2015 a "National Day to End Bullying."

In 2016, HHH President Liz Olszewski and HHH participant Dylan Armus were invited by Sis Wenger (President of the National Association for Children of Alcoholics) to testify to Congress as the "voice of a child of an alcoholic/addict" in support of the CARA Act (Comprehensive Addiction Recovery Act). This experience brought HHH much exposure and involvement in the national effort to raise the country's awareness and need for congressional action to combat the opiate epidemic.

== Promotion and fundraising ==
Since its creation in 2009, HHH has been the recipient of donations from both equestrian and non-equestrian families and corporate companies.

In 2012, HHH put on the first White, White West Party to raise money for the charity. 2017's White, White West Party was HHH's most successful fundraiser to date, bringing in over $100,000. This Western-themed party draws guests from around the country to support the cause. All proceeds raised through ticket sales, auction items and donations go directly to program expenses of Horses Healing Hearts.

Since 2015, HHH has received fundraising money from the Great Charity Challenge, held at the start of the Winter Equestrian Festival at the Palm Beach International Equestrian Center. In a relay-style jumping competition, charities including HHH are represented by a team and prize money won would be a donation to the team's charity. In 2017, HHH received $21,000 and $67,000 total in donations from this event alone.

== Studies ==
Equine therapy, also known as hippotherapy, for physical disabilities and ailments has been practiced in the United States since the 1960s, with the practice truly taking hold after the creation of the North American Riding for the Handicapped Association (NARHA) in 1969. However, using horses for emotional trauma is a fairly recent development. Throughout the early 2000s, a number of studies were conducted to address the effects of equine-assisted psychotherapy in children. Notable examples include the 2011 study by the Cincinnati Children's Hospital Medical Center, the 2009 study completed by Lentini and Knox, and the 2014 study completed by the University of Washington, which concluded that there was a noticeable reduction in pediatric cortisol levels after working with equines. The accumulation of these studies have shown strong evidence to suggest that therapeutic riding benefits children's social skills, self-esteem, self-control, communication skills, and respect for others.
