= COA =

COA or CoA may refer to:

== Organizations ==
- Andorran Olympic Committee (Catalan: Comitè Olímpic Andorrà)
- Argentine Olympic Committee (Spanish: Comité Olímpico Argentino)
- Aruban Olympic Committee (Papiamento: Comité Olímpico Arubano)
- Canadian Osteopathic Association, a professional association of osteopathic physicians in Canada
- Chicago Options Associates, an American company that specializes in trading options and futures contracts
- Clowns of America International, an American organization that represents clowns
- Committee of Administrators (CoA), oversaw the reform in 2017 of the Board of Control for Cricket in India
- Council of Agriculture, agriculture-related institution in Taiwan
- Council of Architecture, an Indian governmental organization that registers architects in the country
- Community Oncology Alliance, an American non-profit that advocates for independent, community oncology providers and patients.
- Continental Airlines, by ICAO airline code
- Customs Officers' Association of New Zealand, a trade union
- COA Ontario, an association representing condominium owners in Canada
- Commission on Audit (Philippines), government agency
  - Commission on audit, another name for supreme audit institutions

=== Colleges ===
- College of Alameda, a college in Alameda, California
- College of The Albemarle, a college in Elizabeth City, North Carolina, US
- College of the Atlantic, a college in Bar Harbor, Maine, US

== Law and business ==
- Certificate of authenticity, a document demonstrating that an item is as claimed
- Chart of accounts, a categorized list of accounts used by a business
- Charter Ownership Agreement, the right to purchase season tickets to a particular seat at a stadium
- Court of Appeal (England and Wales), a court that reviews the decisions reached by lower courts

== Science, medicine and technology ==
- Care-of address, a temporary IP address assigned to a mobile internet device
- Certificate of analysis, a document certifying the identification and purity of a chemical a drug; see Drug reference standard
- Certified Ophthalmic Assistant, entry level assistant as certified by Joint Commission on Allied Health Personnel in Ophthalmology (IJCAHPO)
- Change of Authorization, a designation for RADIUS codes
- Children of Alcoholics/Children of Addicts, see also NACoA/National Association for Children of Alcoholics
- Ciphertext-only attack, where an attacker only has encrypted data to use in deciphering text
- Collaboration-oriented architecture, a type of computer system designed to help companies work with outside organizations
- Coarctation of the aorta, a congenital condition whereby a section of the aorta is narrowed
- Coenzyme A, a coenzyme used in processing fatty acids and citric acid

== Other uses ==
- Certificate of Authorization, used within the Federal Aviation Administration
- Coahuila, (ISO 3166 code MX-COA), a state in Mexico
- Coat of arms, a unique heraldic design used to cover armor and identify its wearer
- Community Organization Award (COA), Boy Scouts of America
- Course of Action, in the Military Decision Making Process
- Colin of Arabia, a Massachusetts hardcore band

== See also ==
- Coa (disambiguation)
