= Melody Beattie =

American writer (1948–2025)

- Born: Melody Lynn Valliancourt; May 26, 1948; Ramsey, Minnesota, U.S.
- Died: February 27, 2025 (aged 76); Los Angeles, California, U.S.
- Spouses: Steven Thurik (divorced); David Beattie (divorced); Scott Mengshol (divorced); Dallas Taylor (divorced)
- Children: 3
- Writing career
- Genre: Self-help books
- Subject: Codependent relationships
- Notable work: Codependent No More
- Website: melodybeattie.com

Melody Lynn Beattie (née Valliancourt; May 26, 1948 – February 27, 2025) was an American author of self-help books on codependent relationships.

== Early life and education ==
Melody Lynn Vaillancourt was born in Ramsey, Minnesota, on May 26, 1948. She was raised by her mother in Saint Paul, Minnesota, and experienced a traumatic childhood: she was sexually abused by a stranger when she was five, and her mother was physically abusive to her siblings, though not to Melody herself. She began drinking at age 12, was an alcoholic by age 13, and a drug addict by 18. She graduated from high school with honors. However, she was arrested for her involvement in a series of pharmacy robberies a few years later, and underwent treatment for drug addiction.

== Career ==
Beattie eventually became licensed as a counselor for addiction. When counseling women married to men undergoing treatment for alcoholism, she noticed the prevalence of codependence in their relationships, and was motivated to research and write about the issue. She published 18 books including Codependent No More, Beyond Codependency, The Language of Letting Go and Make Miracles in Forty Days: Turning What You Have into What You Want, published in 2010. Several of her books have been published in other languages.

Beattie, along with Janet G. Woititz and Robin Norwood, were popularizers of science, helping to digest and explain the work of psychiatrist Timmen L. Cermak, author of Diagnosing and Treating Co-Dependence. Beattie popularized the concept of codependency in 1986 with Codependent No More, which sold eight million copies.

Codependent No More was first published by the Hazelden Foundation.

Beattie's early works were never connected to a 12-Step program called Co-Dependents Anonymous and were commonly mistaken to be a part of CoDA. "CoDA" has a conference-approved (official) "the Big Book" of its own.

== Personal life and death ==
After a marriage to Steven Thurik ended in divorce, she married David Beattie, an addiction counselor; however, he also struggled with alcoholism, which preceded their divorce. Two additional marriages also ended in divorce; one to Scott Mengshol and to drummer Dallas Taylor. She had a son from her first marriage and a son and daughter from her second. Shane, her son from her second marriage, died in a skiing accident in 1991; she wrote about her grief after his death in the 1995 book The Lessons of Love.

Beattie's health declined in the last months of her life. She was evacuated from her Malibu, California home during the January 2025 Southern California wildfires, and went to her daughter's residence in Los Feliz, Los Angeles, where she died from heart failure on February 27, 2025, at the age of 76.
