= Codependency =

Type of relationship

In psychology, codependency is a theory that attempts to explain imbalanced relationships where one person enables another person's self-destructive behavior, such as addiction, poor mental health, immaturity, irresponsibility, or under-achievement.

Definitions of codependency vary, but typically include high self-sacrifice, a focus on others' needs, suppression of one's own emotions, and attempts to control or fix other people's problems.

People who self-identify as codependent are more likely to have low self-esteem, but it is unclear whether this is a cause or an effect of characteristics associated with codependency.

== History ==
The term codependency most likely developed in Minnesota in the late 1970s from co-alcoholic, when alcoholism and other drug dependencies were grouped together as "chemical dependency". In Alcoholics Anonymous, it became clear that alcoholism was not solely about the addict, but also about the enabling behaviors of the alcoholic's social network. The term codependent was first used to describe persons whose lives were affected through their involvement with a person with a substance use disorder, resulting in the development of a pattern of coping with life that was not healthy as a reaction to that other person's substance abuse.

In 1986, psychiatrist Timmen L. Cermak published Diagnosing and Treating Co-Dependence, from which he developed the unsuccessful argument that codependency should be diagnosable as a personality disorder in people who maintained relationships with "personality disordered, chemically dependent, other co-dependent, and/or impulse disordered individuals."

Melody Beattie popularized the concept of codependency in 1986 with the bestselling book Codependent No More, which drew on her personal experience in recovery and as a caregiver for somebody with a substance use disorder and interviews with members of Al-Anon, a support group for family members of alcoholics. Beattie's work formed the basis for the development of a twelve-step organisation called Co-Dependents Anonymous, founded in 1986.

== Definition ==
Codependency has no established definition or diagnostic criteria within the mental health community. It has not been included as a condition in any edition of the Diagnostic and Statistical Manual of Mental Disorders (DSM) or the International Classification of Disease (ICD).

A 1994 review of the literature on codependency found that there was no consensus on a clear definition of the term, that the concept lacked empirical validation across the surveyed articles, and that most authors who attempted to define codependency instead conflate that task with developing theories about its nature and origins. A 2004 survey that sought to clarify the definition of codependency, as a prelude to evaluating it as a possible psychological diagnosis, found that definitions within surveyed papers varied significantly, but tended to identify as core elements high self-sacrifice, a focus on others' needs, suppression of one's own emotions, and attempts to control or fix other people's problems.

According to psychiatrist Timmen Cermak, the concept of codependency carries three different levels of meaning:

- An instructive tool that, once explained to families, helps them normalize the feelings that they are experiencing and allows them to shift their focus from the dependent person to their own dysfunctional behavior patterns.
- A psychological concept, a shorthand means for health professionals to describe and explain certain behavior with each other.
- A psychological disorder, implying that there is a consistent pattern of traits or behaviors across individuals that can create significant dysfunction.

Writer Melody Beattie proposed that, "The obvious definition [of codependency] would be: being a partner in dependency. This definition is close to the truth but still unclear." Beattie elaborated, "A codependent person is one who has let another person's behavior affect him or her, and who is obsessed with controlling that person's behavior."

Therapist and self-help author Darlene Lancer expresses that "A codependent is a person who can’t function from his or her innate self and instead organizes thinking and behavior around a substance, process, or other person(s)." Lancer includes all addicts in her definition. She believes a "lost self" is the core of codependency.

In the Medical Subject Heading (MeSH) vocabulary maintained by the U.S. National Library of Medicine, 'Codependency' is described for indexing purposes as "a relational pattern in which a person attempts to derive a sense of purpose through relationships with others." This reflects usage in the literature rather than an official definition.

Co-Dependents Anonymous, a self-help organization for people who seek to develop healthy and functional relationships, "offer[s] no definition or diagnostic criteria for codependence," but provides a list of "patterns and characteristics of codependence" that can be used by laypeople for self-evaluation. The community health organization, Mental Health America, characterizes codependency as "relationship addiction" based upon its association with low self-esteem, and with patterns of unhealthy and abusive relationships.

== Theories ==
According to theories of codependency as a psychological disorder, the codependent partner in a relationship is often described as displaying self-perception, attitudes and behaviors that serve to increase problems within the relationship instead of decreasing them. It is often suggested that people who are codependent were raised in dysfunctional families or with early exposure to addiction behavior, resulting in their allowance of similar patterns of behavior by their partner.

=== Romantic relationships ===
Codependent relationships are often described as being marked by intimacy problems, dependency, control (including caretaking), denial, dysfunctional communication and boundaries, and high reactivity. There may be imbalance within the relationship, where one person is abusive or in control or supports or enables another person's addiction, poor mental health, immaturity, irresponsibility, or under-achievement.

Under this conception of codependency, the codependent person's sense of purpose within a relationship is based on making extreme sacrifices to satisfy their partner's needs. Codependent relationships signify a degree of unhealthy "clinginess" and needy behavior, where one person does not have self-sufficiency or autonomy. One or both parties depend on their loved one for fulfillment.

=== Family dynamics ===
In the dysfunctional family, the child learns to become attuned to the parent's needs and feelings instead of the other way around. Parenting is a role that requires a certain amount of self-sacrifice and giving a child's needs a high priority. A parent can be codependent toward their own child. Generally, a parent who takes care of their own needs (emotional and physical) in a healthy way will be a better caregiver, whereas a codependent parent may be less effective or may even do harm to a child. Codependent relationships often manifest through enabling behaviors, especially between parents and their children. Another way to look at it is that the needs of an infant are necessary but temporary, whereas the needs of the codependent are constant. Children of codependent parents who ignore or negate their own feelings may become codependent.

=== Relationship with other disorders ===
Codependency may occur within the context of relationships with people with DSM and ICD diagnosable personality disorders:

- Borderline personality disorder – there is a tendency for loved ones of people with borderline personality disorder (BPD) to slip into "caretaker" roles, giving priority and focus to problems in the life of the person with BPD rather than to issues in their own lives. The codependent partner may gain a sense of worth by being perceived as "the sane one" or "the responsible one." A 2017 study found that 45% of assessed codependent people were also borderline.
- Narcissistic personality disorder – narcissists, with their ability to get others to "buy into their vision" and help them make it a reality, seek and attract partners who will put others' needs before their own. A codependent person can provide the narcissist with an obedient and attentive audience. Among the reciprocally interlocking interactions of the pair are the narcissist's overpowering need to feel important and special and the codependent person's strong need to help others feel that way.

Of the commonly recognised personality disorders, codependency is most similar to dependent personality disorder." A 2017 study found that only 14.5% of codependent people assessed were also dependent. The two conditions differ in important ways. A dependent person seeks satisfaction from someone else running their life, while a codependent person seeks satisfaction from running someone else's life to that person's satisfaction. Both have a weak ego and prioritise the stronger ego of another person, but one wishes to be passive and the other active.

Psychiatrist Karen Horney defined the concept of morbid dependency in her 1942 book Self-Analysis, later expanding on it in her 1950 book Neurosis and Human Growth. Others later associated this condition with codepedency.

Codependency can be seen as a form of learned helplessness and pathological altruism.

== Recovery and prognosis ==
With no consensus as to how codependency should be defined, and with no recognized diagnostic criteria, mental health professionals hold a range of opinions about the diagnosis and treatment of codependency. Caring for an individual with a physical addiction is not necessarily a pathology. The caregiver may benefit from assertiveness skills and the ability to place responsibility for the addiction on the other.

Individuals who identify with codependency may benefit from psychotherapy, including cognitive behavioral therapy and mindfulness practices.

Many self-help guides have been written on the subject of codependency. Self-help groups such as Co-Dependents Anonymous (CoDA), Al-Anon/Alateen, Nar-Anon, and Adult Children of Alcoholics (ACoA), which are based on the twelve-step program model of Alcoholics Anonymous, or Celebrate Recovery, a Christian twelve-step, Bible-based group, also provide support for recovery from codependency.

== Controversy ==
As codependency is not clinically diagnosable as a mental health condition, there is no medical consensus as to its definition, and no evidence that codependency is caused by a disease process, the term becomes easily applicable to many behaviors and has been overused by some self-help authors and support communities. In an article in Psychology Today, clinician Kristi Pikiewicz suggested that the term codependency has been overused to the point of becoming a cliché, and labeling a patient as codependent can shift the focus on how their traumas shaped their current relationships.

Some scholars and treatment providers assert that codependency should be understood as a positive impulse gone awry, and challenge the idea that interpersonal behaviors should be conceptualized as addictions or diseases, as well as the pathologizing of personality characteristics associated with women. A study of the characteristics associated with codependency found that non-codependency was associated with masculine character traits, while codependency was associated with negative feminine traits, such as being self-denying, self-sacrificing, or displaying low self-esteem.

== See also ==
- Alcoholism in family systems
- Adult Children of Alcoholics & Dysfunctional Families
- Attachment theory
- Anxious-preoccupied attachment style
- Codependents Anonymous
- Dependent personality disorder
- Enabling
- Enmeshment
- Factitious disorder imposed on another
- Pathological altruism
