= Alcoholism in family systems =

Social and psychological factors that cause alcoholism in families

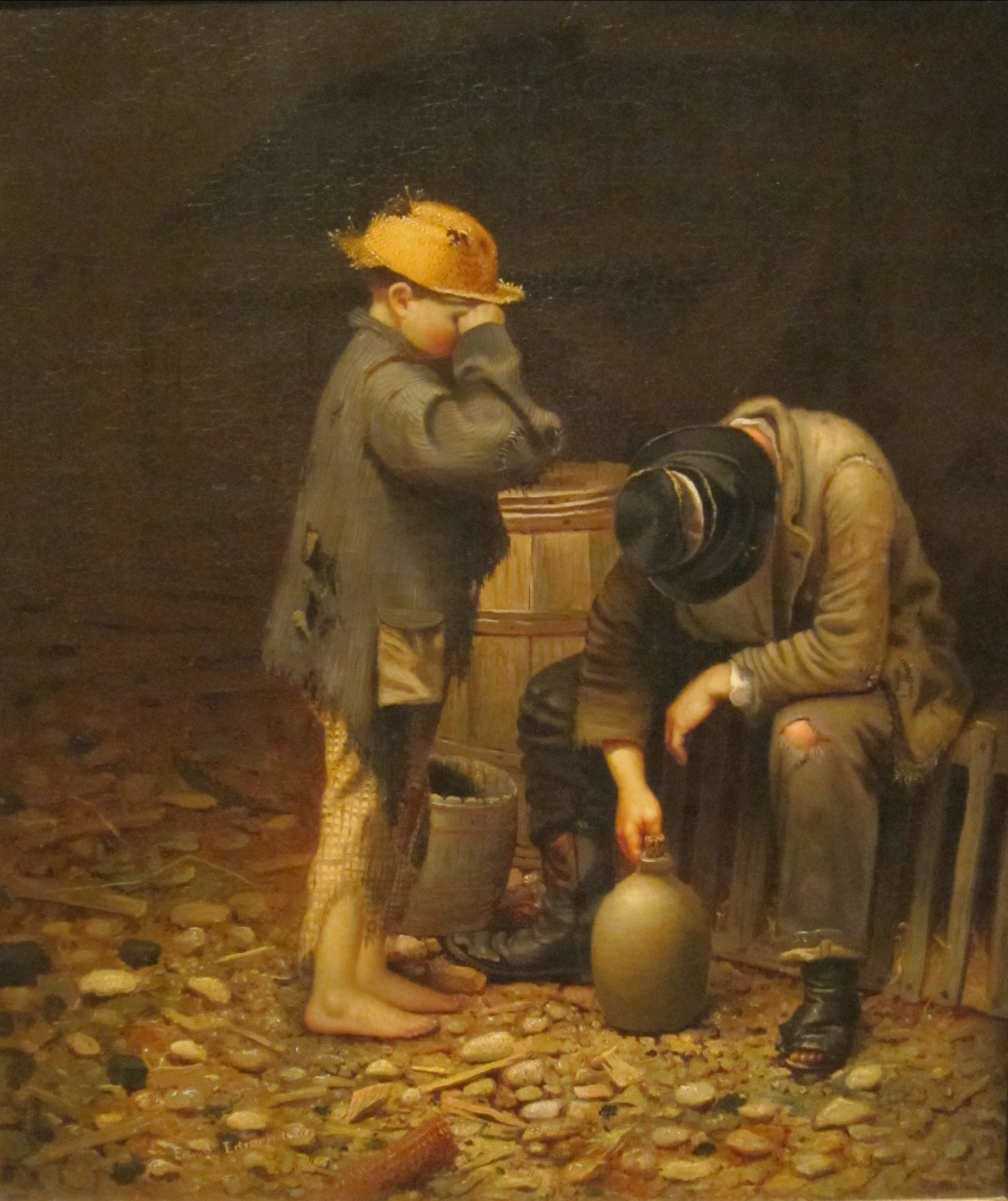
Temperance Lecture, an 1861 portrait by Edward Edmondson, Jr. now on display at the Dayton Art Institute

Alcoholism in family systems refers to the conditions in families that enable alcoholism and the effects of alcoholic behavior by one or more family members on the rest of the family. Mental health professionals are increasingly considering alcoholism, substance abuse, and addiction as diseases that flourish in and are enabled by family systems.

Family members react to the alcoholic with particular behavioral patterns. They may enable the addiction to continue by shielding the addicted family member from the negative consequences of their actions. Such behaviors are referred to as codependence. In this way, the alcoholic is said to suffer from the disease of addiction, whereas the family members suffer from the disease of codependence. While it is recognized that addiction is a family disease affecting the entire family system, "the family is often ignored and neglected in the treatment of addictive disease." Each member is affected and should receive treatment for their benefit and healing, but in addition to benefitting the individuals themselves, this also helps to support the addicts in their recovery process. "The chances of recovery are greatly reduced unless the co-dependents are willing to accept their role in the addictive process and submit to treatment themselves." "Co-dependents are mutually dependent on the addict to fulfill some need of their own."

For example, the "Chief Enabler" (the main enabler in the family) will often turn a blind eye to the addict's drug/alcohol use as this allows for the enabler to continue to play the victim and/or martyr role while allowing the addict to continue his/her own destructive behavior. Therefore, "the behavior of each reinforces and maintains the other, while also raising the costs and emotional consequences for both."

Alcoholism is one of the leading causes of a dysfunctional family. "About one-fourth of the U.S. population is a member of a family that is affected by an addictive disorder in a first-degree relative." As of 2001, there were an estimated 26.8 million children of alcoholics (COAs) in the United States, with as many as 11 million of them under the age of 18. Children of addicts have an increased suicide rate and on average have total health care costs 32 percent greater than children of nonalcoholic families.

According to the American Psychiatric Association, physicians stated three criteria to diagnose this disease:

- physiological problems, such as hand tremors and blackouts
- psychological problems, such as excessive desire to drink
- behavioral problems that disrupt social interaction or work performance.

Adults from alcoholic families experience higher levels of state and trait anxiety and lower levels of differentiation of self than adults raised in non-alcoholic families. Additionally, adult children of alcoholics have lower self-esteem, excessive feelings of responsibility, difficulties reaching out, higher incidence of depression, and increased likelihood of becoming alcoholics.

Parental alcoholism may affect the fetus even before a child is born. In pregnant women, alcohol is carried to all of the mother's organs and tissues, including the placenta, where it easily crosses through the membrane separating the maternal and fetal blood systems. When a pregnant woman drinks an alcoholic beverage, the blood alcohol content of her unborn baby is the same level as her own. A pregnant woman who consumes alcohol during her pregnancy may give birth to a baby with fetal alcohol syndrome (FAS). FAS is known to produce children with damage to the central nervous system resulting in general growth deficits and craniofacial abnormality. As of 2009, the prevalence of the syndrome was thought to be between 2–5 per 1000.

Alcoholism does not have uniform effects on all families. The levels of dysfunction and resiliency of non-alcoholic adults are important factors in effects on children in the family. Children of untreated alcoholics have lower measures of family cohesion, intellectual-cultural orientation, active-recreational orientation, and independence. They have higher levels of conflict within the family, and many experience other family members as distant and non-communicative. In families with untreated alcoholics, the cumulative effect of the family dysfunction may affect the children's ability to grow in developmentally healthy ways.

== Family roles ==
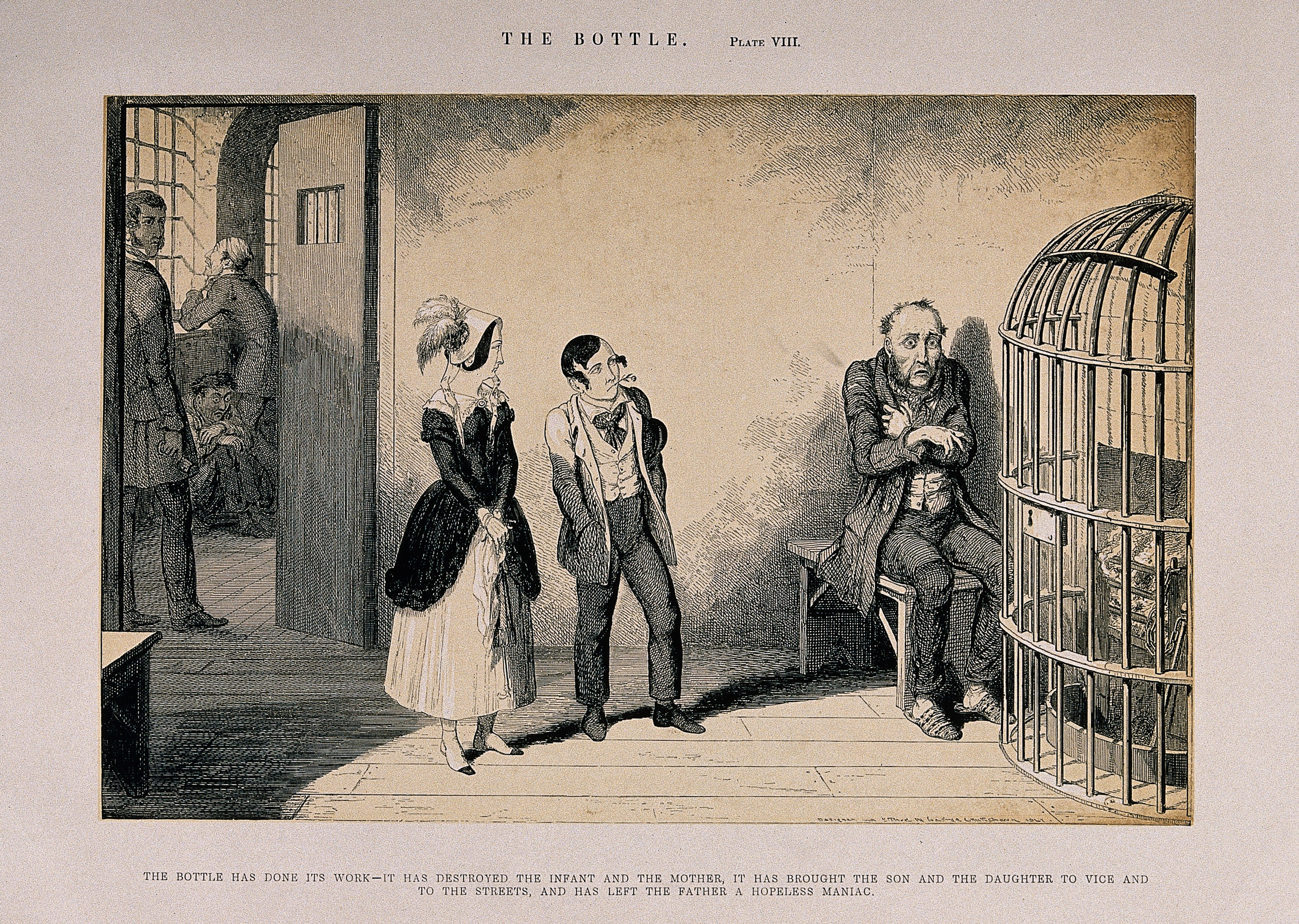
"A maniacal man is visited in prison by his children, all ruined through his drinking habit". Reproduction of an etching by G. Cruikshank, 1847.

The role of the "Chief Enabler" is typically the spouse, significant other, parent, or eldest child of an addict or alcoholic. This person demonstrates "a strong tendency to avoid any confrontation of the addictive behavior and a subconscious effort to actively perpetuate the addiction." The "Chief Enabler" also often doubles as the "Responsible One", or "Family Hero", another role assumed by family members of the addict. Both the "Chief Enabler" and "Responsible One" (aka "Model Child") will take "over [the addict's] roles and responsibilities". For example, a parent might pay for expenses and take over responsibilities (i.e. car payments, the raising of a grandchild, provide room and board, etc.), while a child may provide care for their siblings, become the "peacekeeper" in the home, take on all the chores and cooking, etc. A spouse or significant other may overcompensate by providing all the care to the children, being the sole financial contributor to the household, covering up or hiding the addiction from others, etc. This role often receives the most praise from non-family members, causing the individual to struggle to see that it is an unhealthy role that contributes to the addict/alcoholic's disease as well as the family's dysfunction.

Another role is that of the "Problem Child" or "Scapegoat." This person "may be the only [one] clearly seen as having a problem" outside of the actual addict or alcoholic. This child (or adult child of the alcoholic) "gets blamed for everything; they have problems at school, exhibit negative behavior, and often develop drug or alcohol problems as a way to act out. Their behavior demands whatever attention is available from parents and siblings." This often "takes the focus off the parental alcohol problem", and the child can be the "scapegoat" under the misconception that the child's behavior fuels the parent's substance abuse. However, this child draws attention from outsiders, which may contribute to the recognition of the family alcohol problem by outsiders.

The "Lost Child" role is identified in this system through children that are "withdrawn, 'spaced-out,' and disconnected from the life and emotions around them." They often avoid "any emotionally confronting issues, [and so are] unable to form close friendships or intimate bonds with others."

Other children "trivialize things by minimizing all serious issues as an avoidance strategy [and] are well-liked and easy to befriend but are usually superficial in all relationships, including those with their own family members." These children are known as the "Mascot" or "Family Clown".

However, alcoholic family roles have not withstood the standards or testing that psychological theories of personality are typically subjected to. The evidence for alcoholic family roles theory provides limited or no construct validity or clinical utility.

== Prevalence ==
Based on the number of children with parents meeting the DSM-V criteria for alcohol abuse or alcohol dependence, there were an estimated amount of 26.8 million children of alcoholics (COAs) in the United States as of 1996, of which 11 million were under the age of 18. In 1988, it was estimated that 76 million Americans, about 43 percent of the U.S. adult population, have been exposed to alcoholism or problem drinking in the family, either having grown up with an alcoholic, having an alcoholic blood relative, or marrying an alcoholic. While growing up, nearly one in five adult Americans (18 percent) lived with an alcoholic. In 1992, it was estimated that one in eight adult American drinkers were alcoholics or experienced problems as a consequence of their alcohol use.

== Familiarity ==
Children of alcoholics (COAs) are more susceptible to alcoholism and other drug abuse than children of non-alcoholics. Children of alcoholics are four times more likely than non-COAs to develop alcoholism. Both genetic and environmental factors influence the development of alcoholism in COAs.

COAs' perceptions of their parents' drinking habits influence their own future drinking patterns and are developed at an early age. Alcohol-related expectancies are correlated with parental alcoholism and alcohol abuse among their offspring. Problem-solving discussions in families with an alcoholic parent contained more negative family interactions than in families with non-alcoholic parents. Several factors related to parental alcoholism influence COA substance abuse, including stress, negative affect and decreased parental monitoring. Impaired parental monitoring and negative affect correlate with COAs associating with peers that support drug use.

After drinking alcohol, sons of alcoholics experience more of the physiological changes associated with pleasurable effects compared with sons of non-alcoholics, although only immediately after drinking.

Compared with non-alcoholic families, alcoholic families demonstrate poorer problem-solving abilities, both between the parents and within the family as a whole. These communication problems may contribute to the escalation of conflicts in alcoholic families. COAs are more likely than non-COAs to be aggressive, impulsive, and engage in disruptive and sensation-seeking behaviors.

Alcohol addiction is a complex disease that results from a variety of genetic, social, and environmental influences. Alcoholism affected approximately 4.65 percent of the U.S. population from 2001 to 2002, producing severe economic, social, and medical ramifications. Researchers estimate that between 50 and 60 percent of alcoholism risk is determined by genetics. This strong genetic component has sparked numerous linkage and association studies investigating the roles of chromosomal regions and genetic variants in determining alcoholism susceptibility.

== Marital relationships ==
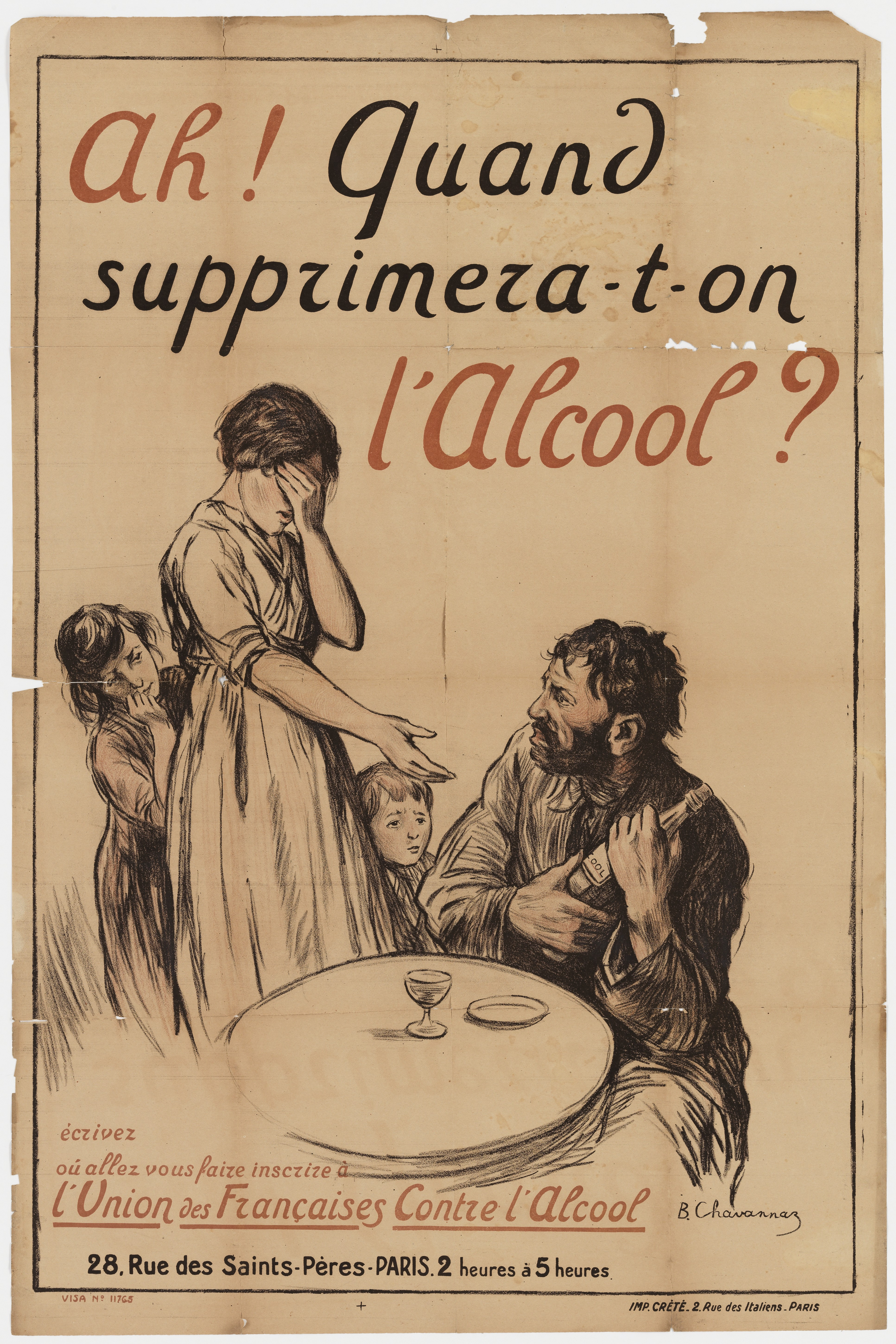
A French temperance organisation poster depicting the effects of alcoholism in a marriage

Alcoholism usually has strong negative effects on marital relationships. Separated and divorced men and women were three times as likely as married men and women to say they had been married to an alcoholic or problem drinker. Almost two-thirds of separated and divorced women and almost half of separated or divorced men under age 46 have been exposed to alcoholism in the family at some time.

Exposure was higher among women (46.2 percent) than among men (38.9 percent) and declined with age. Exposure to alcoholism in the family was strongly related to marital status, independent of age: 55.5 percent of separated or divorced adults had been exposed to alcoholism in some family member, compared with 43.5 percent of married, 38.5 percent of never married, and 35.5 percent of widowed persons. Nearly 38 percent of separated or divorced women had been married to an alcoholic, but only about 12 percent of currently married women were married to an alcoholic.

== Children ==
=== Prevalence of abuse ===
Over one million children yearly are confirmed as victims of child abuse and neglect by state child protective service agencies. Substance abuse is one of the two largest problems affecting families in the United States, being a factor in nearly four-fifths of reported cases. Alcoholism is more prevalent among child-abusing parents. Alcoholism is more strongly correlated to child abuse than depression and other disorders.

Adoption plays only a slight role in alcoholism in the family. Studies were done comparing children who were born into a family with an alcoholic parent and raised by adoptive (non-alcoholic) parents as compared to children born to non-alcoholic parents and raised by adopted alcoholic parents. The results (in US and Scandinavian studies) were that those adopted children born of an alcoholic parent (and adopted by non-alcoholic parents) developed alcoholism at higher rates as adults.

=== Correlates ===
Children of alcoholics exhibit symptoms of depression and anxiety more than children of non-alcoholics. COAs have lower self-esteem than non-COAs from childhood through young adulthood. Children of alcoholics show more symptoms of anxiety, depression, and externalizing behavior disorders than non-COAs. Some of these symptoms include crying, lack of friends, fear of going to school, nightmares, perfectionism, hoarding, and excessive self-consciousness.

Many children of alcoholics score lower on tests measuring cognitive and verbal skills than non-COAs. Lacking the requisite skills to express themselves can impact academic performance, relationships, and job interviews. The lack of these skills do not, however, imply that COAs are intellectually impaired. COAs are also shown to have difficulty with abstraction and conceptual reasoning, both of which play an important role in problem-solving, academically and otherwise.

In her book Adult Children of Alcoholics, Janet G. Woititz describes numerous traits common among adults who had an alcoholic parent. Although not necessarily universal or comprehensive, these traits constitute an adult children of alcoholics syndrome (cf. the work of Wayne Kritsberg).

=== Coping mechanisms ===
Suggested practices to mitigate the impact of parental alcoholism on the development of their children include:

- Maintaining healthy family traditions and practices, such as vacations, mealtimes, and holidays.
- Encouraging COAs to develop consistent, stable relationships with significant others outside of the family.
- Planning non-drinking activities to compete with alcoholic behavior and tendencies.

=== Resilience ===
Professor and psychiatrist Dieter J. Meyerhoff states that the negative health effects of alcoholism are particularly harmful to the lives of family and children. The family is the main institution in which the child should feel safe and have moral values. If a good starting point is given, it is less likely that when a child becomes an adult, has a mental disorder, or is addicted to drugs or alcohol. According to the American Academy of Child and Adolescent Psychiatry (AACAP), children are in a unique position when their parents abuse alcohol. The behavior of a parent is the essence of the problem because the children do not have and can not receive support from their own families. When they see changes from happy to angry parents, the children begin to think that they are the reason for these changes. Self-accusation, guilt, frustration, and anger arise because the child is trying to understand why this behavior occurs. Dependence on alcohol creates large amounts of harm to childhood and adolescent psychology in a family environment.

Psychologists Michelle L. Kelley and Keith Klostermann describe the effects of parental alcoholism on children and describe the development and behavior of these children. Children of alcoholics often face problems such as behavioral disorders, oppression, crime, and attention deficit disorder, and a higher risk of depression and anxiety. Thus, they begin drinking alcohol earlier and more often, increasing the likelihood of developing moderate to severe alcoholism. Young people with parental abuse and parental violence are likely to live in large crime areas, which may have a negative impact on the quality of schools and increase the impact of violence in that area. Paternal alcoholism, and general parental verbal and/or physical abuse can cause the fears of children and the internalization of symptoms, with a greater likelihood of child aggression and emotional misconduct.

Research on alcoholism within families has leaned towards exploring issues that are wrong in the community rather than potential strengths or positives. When researchers conduct research that helps communities, it can be easier for community members to identify with the positives and work towards a path of resilience. Flawed research design in adult children of alcoholics (ACOA) research showed ACOAs were psychologically damaged. Some flawed research designs include using ACOAs as part of the control group and comparing them to other ACOAs within the same study. This may have caused some limitations in the study that were not listed. When comparing ACOAs to other ACOAs, it is difficult to interpret accurate results that show certain behaviors in the group studied. Research that has been conducted more recently has used control groups with non-ACOAs to see whether the behaviors align with prior research. This research has shown that behaviors were similar between non-ACOAs and ACOAs. An 18-year study compared children of alcoholics (COA) to other COAs. In failing to use non-COAs as controls, an opportunity is missed to see if the negative aspects of a person are related to having an alcoholic parent, or if they are simply a fact of life. For example, in Werner's study, he found that 30 percent of COAs were committing serious delinquencies. This data would have been more usable if they had viewed the percentage of those committing crimes when compared to non-ACOAs. In a study conducted in a Midwestern university, researchers found that there was no significant difference between ACOA and non-ACOA students. One of the main differences was the student's views on how they connect their past experiences with their current social-emotional functioning. Students who were ACOAs did not demonstrate issues with their perspective on their interpersonal issues any more than the non-ACA students. However, this study did show that there were other underlying problems in the family structure that may attribute to the perception of not being well adjusted in life.

Due to the flawed research that has been conducted in the past, many stereotypes have followed ACOAs. ACOAs have been identified as having a variety of emotional and behavioral problems, such as sleep problems, aggression, and lowered self-esteem. When it comes to being a COA or ACOA, there is still hope. Results showed that a supportive and loving relationship with one of the parents can counterbalance the possible negative effects of the relationship with the alcoholic parent. When there is one alcoholic parent in the household, it helps if the child relies on other family members for support. It may be the second parent, siblings, or members of the extended family. Having other supportive family members can help the child feel like s/he is not alone. Younger generations of ACOAs scored more positively, in terms of coping mechanisms. This may be due to the fact that alcoholism is seen more as an illness nowadays, rather than a moral defect. There has been less victim blaming of alcoholism on parents because it has now been declared a disease rather than a behavioral problem. Studies show that when ACOAs use positive coping mechanisms, it is related to more positive results. When an ACOA approaches their issues, rather than avoids them, it often relates to having a positive outlook. Studies have shown that ACOAs and COAs have more compulsive behaviors that may cause the need for higher achievement. Some ACOAs have shown that the only way to survive is to fend for themselves. This causes a sense of independence that helps them become more self-reliant. Because they perceive independence and hard work as necessary, ACOAs develop a sense of survival instinct.

=== Implications for counselors ===
Counselors serving ACOAs need to be careful to not assume that the client's presenting problems are due solely to the parent's alcoholism. Exploring the ACOAs life events, such as the number of alcoholic parents, length of time the client lived with the alcoholic parent, past interventions, and the role of the extended family may help in determining what the correct method of intervention may be.

Many factors can affect marital and/or parenting difficulties, but there has not been any evidence found that can link these issues specifically to ACOAs. Research has been conducted to try to identify issues that arise when someone is a COA. It has been hard to isolate these issues solely to the fact that the child's parents are alcoholics. Other behaviors need to be studied, like dysfunctional family relationships, childhood abuse, and other childhood stressors, and how they may contribute to things like depression, anxiety, and bad relationships in ACOAs.

Counselors serving ACOAs can also help by working on building coping mechanisms such as creating meaningful relationships with other non-alcoholic family members. Having other family members who are supportive can help the ACOA feel like they are not alone. Counselors can also provide some psycho-education on alcoholism and its effects on family members of alcoholics. Research shows that ACOAs feel less like blaming their parents for their alcoholism after learning that alcoholism is a disease, rather than a behavior.

== Pregnancy ==
Prenatal alcohol-related effects can occur with moderate levels of alcohol consumption by non-alcoholic and alcoholic women. Cognitive performance in infants and children is not as impacted by mothers who stopped alcohol consumption early in pregnancy, even if it was resumed after giving birth.

An analysis of six-year-olds with alcohol exposure during the second trimester of pregnancy showed lower academic performance and problems with reading, spelling, and mathematical skills. Six percent of offspring from alcoholic mothers have fetal alcohol syndrome (FAS). The risk an offspring born to an alcoholic mother having FAS increases from 6 percent to 70 percent if the mother's previous child had FAS.

People diagnosed with FAS have IQs ranging from 20 to 105 (with a mean of 68), and demonstrate poor concentration and attention skills. FAS causes growth deficits, morphological abnormalities, intellectual disability, and behavioral difficulties. Among adolescents and adults, those with FAS are more likely to have mental health problems, drop out or be suspended from school, problems with the law, require assisted living as an adult, and problems with maintaining employment.

== See also ==
- Adult Children of Alcoholics
- Al-Anon/Alateen
- Concordance (genetics)
- Dual diagnosis
- Dysfunctional family
- Nar-Anon
- National Association for Children of Alcoholics
- Self-medication
