= Narcanon =

Narcanon is a misspelling which could refer to:

- Narconon, drugs education and rehabilitation program, founded in 1966

Narcanon should not be confused with these unrelated organisations:

- Narcotics Anonymous (NA), the twelve-step program of recovery from drug addiction, founded in 1953
- Nar-Anon, the twelve-step program for friends and family members of drug addicts, established in 1968
