= Jericho Equestrian Club =

Equestrian club in Jericho, West Bank

The Jericho Equestrian Club is an equestrian club in Jericho. The Equestrian Club described itself as "dedicated to the teaching people of all ages and from all walks of life the principles and skills of good horsemanship." It also held races and equestrian competitions.

The Club was founded under the patronage of Chairman of the Palestine Liberation Organization Yasser Arafat 1997. It is part of a large recreation complex for Palestinian youth that includes a botanical garden, a youth hostel and playing fields. In 2008 the Club launched a Therapeutic Riding for the Disabled program under the patronage of Haya bint Hussein, president of the International Equestrian Federation.
