= Camilla Tominey =

British journalist, broadcaster, and commentator (born 1978)

- Born: 14 June 1978 (age 48); Harpenden, Hertfordshire, England
- Education: University of Leeds (LLB)
- Occupations: Journalist; broadcaster; commentator
- Employer(s): The Daily Telegraph; GB News
- Spouse: Dominic Lincoln (m. 2005)
- Children: 3

Camilla Tominey (born 14 June 1978) is a British journalist, broadcaster, and commentator. She is the associate editor and executive editor of The Daily Telegraph. She also writes a weekly column for the newspaper and co-hosts The Daily T podcast with Tim Stanley. Since January 2023, she has presented The Camilla Tominey Show, a Sunday morning politics show on GB News. In 2023 the New Statesman named Tominey as the 49th most influential right-wing figure in British politics.

== Early life ==
Tominey was born on 14 June 1978 in Harpenden, Hertfordshire. Her father was a Catholic and worked as a general practitioner, running the local practice. Her mother Lynne (1947–2001) was a housewife. Tominey's grandfather was in the Royal Navy. She has two older brothers. She was educated at Roundwood JMI School, followed by the independent St Albans High School for Girls from the age of seven. Her parents divorced and she went to live with her mother.

Tominey has commented that her mother suffered from alcoholism and that "there was a degree [...] of physical and mental abuse" with regard to her period living with her. Tominey later moved back to live with her father and brothers. She has described her stepmother Bernice (died 2024) as a "devoted second mother" to her and her siblings. Tominey studied law at the University of Leeds. She has said that she never planned to be a royal reporter, but did aspire to be a journalist.

== Career ==
Tominey was offered a traineeship at the Hemel Hempstead Gazette by the then editor. Within two years at the newspaper she had qualified as a senior journalist. After contacting the Sunday Express and asking for shifts, she left the Hemel Hempstead Gazette and joined the Sunday Express. She was offered the opportunity to report on the British royal family by Sunday Express editor Martin Townsend. She began her career as a royal reporter in 2005 when she covered the wedding of Prince Charles and Camilla Parker Bowles.

At the Sunday Express she worked in several roles concurrently, firstly as royal editor and deputy political editor, and then as royal editor, political editor and a columnist. Press Gazette journalist Dominic Ponsford said this was "a reflection of tight budgets on the title". She joined NBC News in 2010 and co-hosted its coverage of the wedding of Prince William and Catherine Middleton from outside Buckingham Palace alongside Meredith Vieira, Matt Lauer, Andrew Roberts and Martin Bashir. Tominey's scoops have included her 2013 report of Prince Andrew being held at gunpoint by guards at Buckingham Palace. She broke the news of Prince Harry's relationship with Meghan Markle in an article in the Sunday Express on 31 October 2016. The article was nominated for the Scoop of the Year award at the British Press Awards. Tominey covered Prince Harry and Markle's wedding, again for NBC News.

Tominey moved to The Daily Telegraph as associate editor (politics and royals) in 2018. She has been described as holding pro-Brexit views. On 1 May 2021, she began writing a weekly Telegraph column. In June 2021, after misquoting Meghan Markle on a TV programme, she stated that she had received abuse on Twitter and via email, which resulted in Twitter and the police taking action.

On 1 July 2021, it was announced that Tominey would commence a Sunday afternoon show on call-in radio station LBC. The show, which ran from 4 pm to 7 pm, began on 4 July. On 18 August 2022, it was reported she would leave LBC and join GB News as a political presenter. Since January 2023, she has presented The Camilla Tominey Show, a weekly political interview show from 9:30 am to 11 am on Sundays on the channel.

In April 2024, she became The Telegraph's executive editor, and co-host of The Daily T podcast with Kamal Ahmed.

Tominey is a patron of the National Association for Children of Alcoholics and the Peace Hospice. She is a contributor to ITV's This Morning, and has appeared on the BBC's Any Questions? and Question Time.

== Personal life ==
Tominey married commercial manager Dominic Lincoln in 2005; he is a keen guitarist who regularly performs with his band. She lives in St Albans, Hertfordshire, with her husband, their two daughters and their son. She has been teetotal since at least 2011, attributing her mother's death at 54 to alcoholism, and was eager to break the hereditary cycle, following the birth of her second child.
