= Wagon-bed riding =

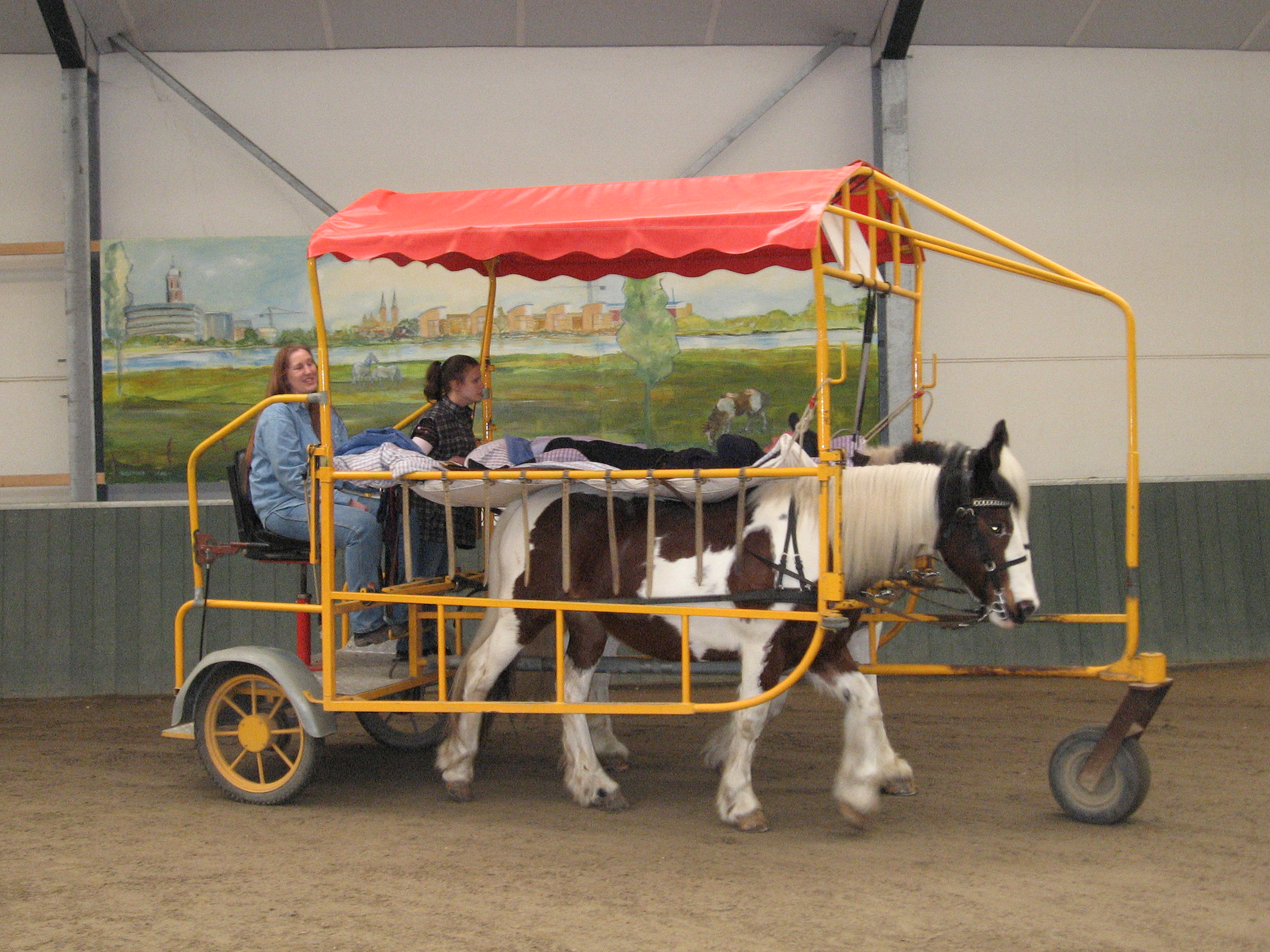
Three-wheeled wagon-bed

Wagon-bed riding is a practice performed with a covered carriage containing a canvas stretcher. It is a way to enable severely disabled people to move and so alleviate complaints such as constipation and spasms.

Wagon-bed riding may be considered a special kind of hippotherapy.

The wagon is a steel construction pulled by two trained horses. Canvas is stretched over the backs of the horses. The patient is placed in supine position on the canvas in the slight hollow between the horses. The rhythm, the warmth of the horses and the ambience has a relaxing and massaging effect on the patient.

Wagon-bed riding is suitable for people who do not get enough physical exercise because of a handicap. During wagon-bed riding the blood circulation and vital functions, such as metabolism and digestion are stimulated. It has a beneficial effect on people who find it difficult to walk.

Complaints such as constipation, epileptic seizures and lung obstruction (e.g. cystic fibrosis), may be reduced by wagon-bed riding. It has also been shown that wagon-bed riding has a stimulating effect on coma patients.

Wagon-bed riding was started in Bennekom (Netherlands), where the "Riding school without thresholds" was established in 1985 upon the initiatives of the Wageningen milkman Johan Roelofsen (1933–2011). As of 2015 there are around twenty locations providing wagon-bed riding, and training for carers is given at the CDB (cursuscentrum Dieropleidingen Barneveld) in nearby Barneveld. As of 2012 there is a new location in Italy. Close to Rome, in Palidoro.

== The horses ==
The horses used are usually Tinkers, Fjords and Haflingers. A shoulder height between 1.40 and 1.45m is ideal. The horses should be of equal shoulder height, preferably have a long back and an even, calm tread. Training a team of horses usually takes a year. Smaller ponies are used for small wagons, but these are not suitable for bigger children or adults and the ponies do not have such a calm tread.

== The canvas fabric beds ==
There are generally 3 types of wagons:

- The three-wheeled "standard" type with one swivel wheel at the front and an axle at the rear, above which the driver's frame is located.
- The four-wheeled type with two swivel wheels at the front and an axle at the rear, above which the driver's frame is located
- The three-wheeled balance type with two wheels beside the middle of the horses and one swivel wheel at the rear, behind the driver's frame.

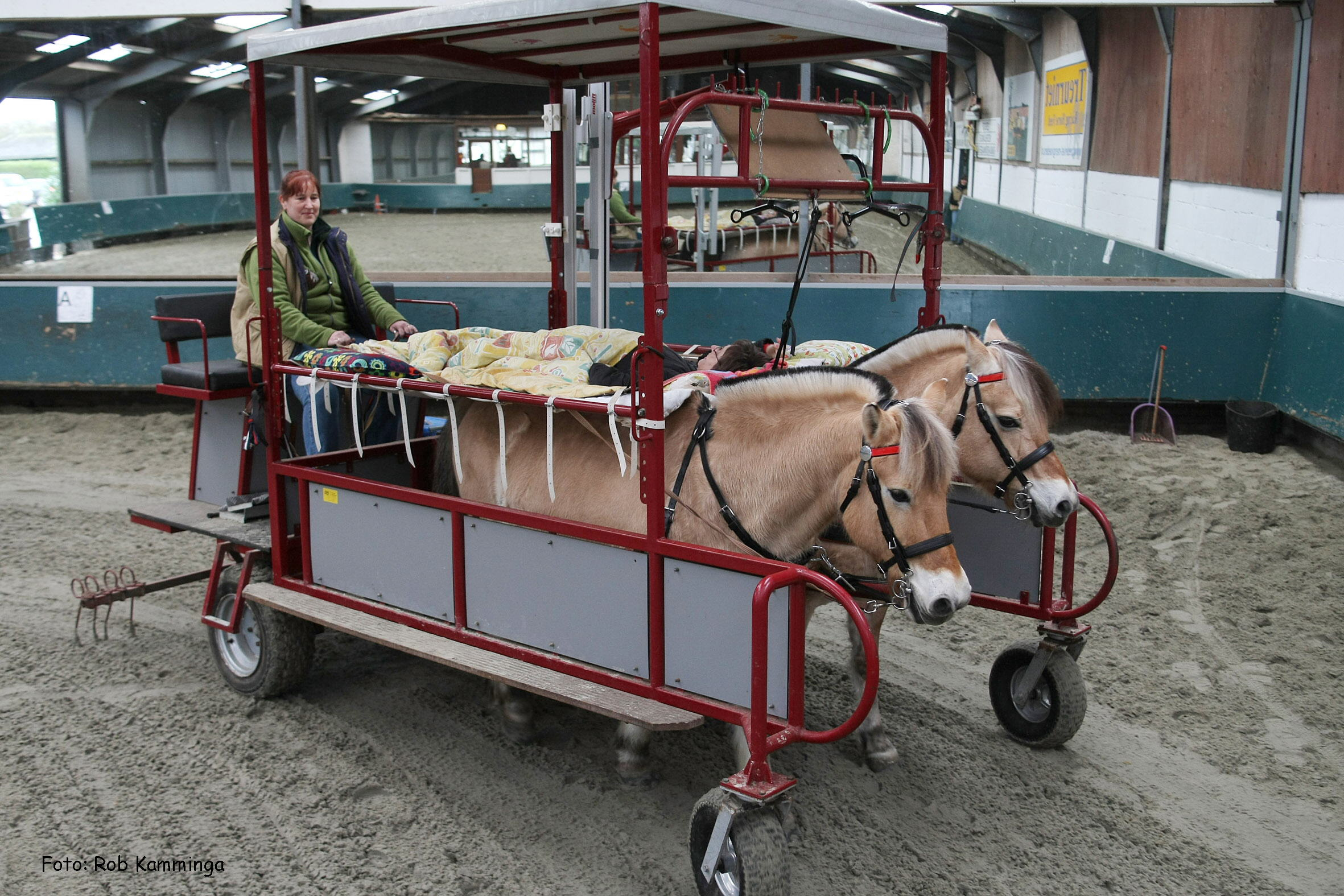
Four-wheeled wagon-bed

The four-wheeled wagon and three-wheeled balance wagon can be provided with a lifting platform to lift the patient onto the canvas fabric bed. With the three-wheeled "standard" type, the patient is lifted onto the canvas with a separate lifting aid. Some wagons are provided with a cushion against which the horses can push, so that they don't require a chest harness and ropes and can be taken in and out of harness quicker.

The frame to which the canvas is fixed should be adjustable for height appropriate to the horses.

In order to intensify the transfer of the motion of the horses to the participant, the canvas on which the participants lies is provided with straps around it or at both sides.

== The riding school ==
The space within the riding school should be as generous as possible (at least 40x20m) and have a firm smooth surface. Depending on the patient, additional (medical) provisions may be necessary. Wagon riding is also combined with care farms and general care institutions.
