= Horseback riding simulators =

Device simulating horseback riding

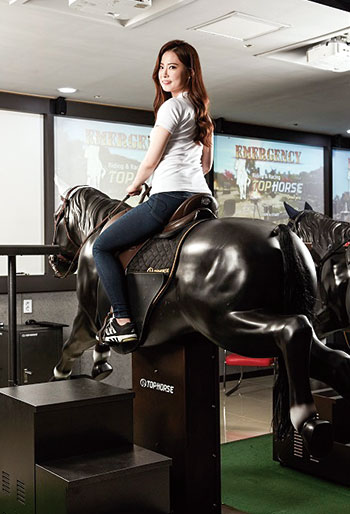

Horseback riding simulators are intended to allow people to gain the benefits of therapeutic horseback riding or to gain skill and conditioning for equestrian activity while diminishing the issues of surrounding cost, availability, and individual comfort level around horses. Horseback therapy has been used by many types of therapists (i.e.: physical, occupational, and speech therapists) to advance their physical, mental, emotional, and social skills.

Simulators used for therapeutic purposes can be used anywhere (i.e.: clinic or a patient home), do not take up much space, and can be programmed to achieve the type of therapy desired. Additionally, difficulty level can be set by the therapist and increased gradually in subsequent sessions to reflect the patient's progress and abilities. Some people use these simulators as personal exercise machines to tone core muscles in an easy and low-impact manner.

== Commercial products ==
Products that attempt to accurately imitate the movement of a real horse and are sometimes used for therapeutic purposes as well as for developing equestrian skills or conditioning are the Equicizer, an American-developed mechanical product that resembles the body of a horse, imitates the movement of a horse, and can be used at slower speeds for therapeutic and rehabilitation purposes. Another product that resembles and moves like a real horse is the line of Racewood Equestrian Simulators, with 13 models to imitate actual movement of horses in various disciplines, including a simple walk and trot model.

Simulators that do not resemble horses but imitate certain aspects of equine motion are popular in some Asian countries such as Japan and South Korea, in part because land for keeping actual horses is quite limited. One such commercial product is the Joba, created in Japan by rehabilitation doctor Testuhiko Kimura and the Matsushita Electric Industrial Company. The Joba does not resemble a horse, but rather just looks like a saddle, with plastic handle and stirrups, attached to a base that allows it to pitch and roll, exercising core muscles. A similar product manufactured in the US is a stool-like device called the iGallop, which was commercially available in the mid-2000s and moves in a side-to-side and circular motion with various speed settings. However, it was criticized for not delivering the results claimed.

== Research ==
=== Cerebral palsy ===
There has been increased research regarding use of horseback riding simulators compared to conventional therapy methods. One 2011 study by Borges et al. compared children with cerebral palsy and postural issues who received conventional therapy to similar children who received therapy involving a riding simulator. The results from this study showed that children who received riding simulator therapy exhibited a statistically significant improvement regarding postural control in the sitting position, specifically regarding the maximal displacement in the mediolateral and anteroposterior directions. Parents of these children noted that their children executed activities of daily living that demanded greater mobility and postural control better than before. In a 2014 study by Lee et al., 26 children with cerebral palsy were divided into two groups: a hippotherapy group and a horseback riding simulator group. The children in each group underwent the same kind of therapy for the same amount of time using either a real horse or the simulator. Conventional physical therapy sessions were attended before each hippotherapy or horseback riding simulator session. It was found that both static and dynamic balance improved for the children in both groups following their 12-week-long programs and there was not a statistically significant difference between the results from the two groups. This indicates that using a horseback riding simulator can be as effective as hippotherapy for improving balance in children with cerebral palsy.

=== Stroke ===
Another area of research involves horseback riding simulation with stroke patients. Trunk balance and gait were assessed before and after the stroke patients were treated using a horseback riding simulator. Because stroke patients are not able to keep both feet on the floor and weight distributed equally between them, it is very easy for them to lose trunk muscle strength and control of the trunk on one or both sides. In a 2014 study, 20 non-traumatic, unilateral stroke patients underwent therapy using a horseback riding simulator. Their therapy included six 30-minute sessions a week for five weeks. The Trunk Impairment Scale (TIS) used to assess the patients before and after their therapy showed that they had better trunk control in a seated position following their sessions. Upon gait analysis, improvements in the areas of velocity, cadence, and stride length of the affected and non-affected sides were all observed. Additionally, the percentage of time spent in the double support phase was decreased. More research studies in which more subjects are tested for longer amounts of time are currently being investigated.
