= Coa =

Coa may refer to:

== Places ==
- Coa, Northern Ireland, a rural community in County Fermanagh, Northern Ireland
- Côa River, a tributary of the Douro, Portugal
  - Combat of the Côa, part of the Peninsular War period of the Napoleonic Wars
  - Prehistoric Rock Art Sites in the Côa Valley
- Quwê (or Coa), an Assyrian vassal state or province from the 9th century BC to around 627 BCE in the lowlands of eastern Cilicia
  - Adana, the ancient capital of Quwê, also called Quwê or Coa

== People ==
- Eibar Coa (born 1971), Venezuelan jockey

== Other uses ==
- Coa de jima, or coa, a specialized tool for harvesting agave cactus
- Coa (stick), a Mesoamerican digging stick for farming
- Coat of arms
- Coa, in Chilean Spanish, a criminal argot

== See also ==
- COA (disambiguation)
- Coea, a genus of butterflies
- Coua, a genus of birds
- Koa, a species of tree
