= National Association for Children of Alcoholics =

The term National Association for Children of Alcoholics may refer to the following organizations:

- National Association for Children of Alcoholics (United States), the United States chapter of NACoA
- National Association for Children of Alcoholics (United Kingdom), the United Kingdom chapter of NACoA
