= National Association for Children of Alcoholics (United Kingdom) =

UK charity

National Association for Children of Alcoholics (Nacoa)
- Formation: May 1990
- Founders: Hilary Henriques, Valerie McGee, Maya Parker, Diana Samways and David Stafford
- Type: Nonprofit
- Registration no.: 1009143
- Purpose: Helping children affected by their parent’s drinking or similar addictive problem
- Headquarters: Bristol
- Region served: United Kingdom
- Product: Telephone helpline, email helpline, publications
- Key people: Hilary Henriques (Chief executive)
- Affiliations: Member of The Helplines Association
- Revenue: £241,555
- Employees: 3 full-time and 5 part-time
- Volunteers: 421
- Website: https://nacoa.org.uk/

The National Association for Children of Alcoholics (Nacoa) is a charity in the United Kingdom providing information and support for people affected by their parent or parents' drinking, via a telephone and email helpline. Nacoa is a registered charity in England and Wales with charity number 1009143.

== History ==
Nacoa was founded in 1990 "to address the needs of children growing up in families where one or both parents suffer from alcohol use disorder or a similar addictive problem". The founders were Hilary Henriques, Valerie McGee, Maya Parker, Diana Samways and David Stafford.

In 2012, Nacoa was involved in a research project for the Children's Commissioner for England reviewing needs and services for children and families affected by parental alcohol misuse. In the report the Children's Commissioner highlights the need for services to support children and their families and suggests that "the misuse of alcohol by parents negatively affects the lives and harms the wellbeing of more children than does the misuse of illegal drugs".

== Services ==
Nacoa provides information, advice and support for everyone affected by a parent's drinking and people concerned for their welfare. This is provided primarily through a free, confidential telephone and email helpline and website. The helpline is staffed by trained volunteers.

Nacoa also produces a range of publications for children (including ‘Some mums and dads drink too much and it's frightening’ and ‘Information for children of alcohol-dependent parents’), parents, professionals, teachers and children’s mental health professionals .

Nacoa conducts outreach and provides information on the problems faced by children living with parental addiction, and of the support available, through media articles and public talks given in settings such as schools, professional agencies, and community organisations. Nacoa is a regular exhibitor at the UK and European Symposium on Addictive Disorders (UKESAD) organised by the alcohol and drug treatment journal Addiction Today.

To commemorate the life of co-founder and author David Stafford, Nacoa holds the annual David Stafford memorial lecture in London. Previous speakers have included Virginia Ironside, Fergal Keane, Lauren Booth, Bill Gallagher, David Yelland, Karl Johnson, Cherie Lunghi, Liam Byrne, Jonathan Ashworth, Camilla Tominey, Calum Best, Tony Adams, Geraldine James, Ceri Walker, David Coldwell, Sophie K and Vicky Pattison.

== Funding ==
Nacoa relies entirely on voluntary donations. As a membership organisation some of these donations come by way of annual subscriptions.

A significant proportion of income comes through people taking part in sponsored events. Many people now collect sponsorship online using sites such as Justgiving. Recent sponsored events have included the Big Nacoa Walk, Nacoa Big Drop abseil of the ArcelorMittal Orbit, the London Landmarks Half Marathon, the Great North Run, a London to Paris bike ride, skydiving and a sponsored haircut. Nacoa was the recipient of the BBC Radio 4 Appeal in 2003 and 2013.

Nacoa has been the charity partner of Upfest, Europe's largest street art festival, since the festival's beginning in 2008.

The UK government announced the first children of alcohol-dependent parents strategy with £6 million for local and national projects, including £380,000 for Nacoa’s helpline. This funding was then cut in 2022.

== Awards ==
In June 2012 Nacoa was awarded the Queen's Award for Voluntary Service. The award, which is the equivalent an MBE, recognises outstanding achievement by groups of volunteers. Nacoa also received the Guardian Charity Award in 2006.

Other recognitions include being awarded the Meritorious Service Award 2012 by NACoA USA and the Mentor UK Certificate of merit in 2008. Nacoa's CEO Hilary Henriques was awarded the Women of the Year Outstanding Achievement Award in 2009. Nacoa is an accredited member of The Helplines Association.

== Media ==
Nacoa's work featured on BBC Comic Relief's Red Nose Day broadcast in 2009. Later in 2009, Nacoa's work featured on the BBC Children in Need film ‘Brought Up By Booze’ where Nacoa patron Calum Best, son of footballer George Best, explored the effect of his father's drinking on his life and met other children in the UK living in similar situations.

Nacoa's CEO, Hilary Henriques, featured as one of fourteen women from across the world in Comic Relief's publication ‘Inspiring Women’ printed in 2010.

A front page story in the Sunday Express in 2017 described how children as young as 5 call Nacoa’s helpline for bedtime stories.

Following campaigning by Nacoa supporters, Health Secretary Jeremy Hunt and Shadow Health Secretary Jonathan Ashworth appeared on BBC Breakfast TV together to jointly announce £6million of support for alcohol-dependent parents and their children.

== Patrons ==
- Tony Adams MBE
- Rt Hon Jonathan Ashworth MP
- Olly Barkley
- Calum Best
- Lauren Booth
- Rt Hon Liam Byrne MP
- David Coldwell
- Geraldine James OBE
- Sophie K
- Cherie Lunghi
- Elle Macpherson
- Vicky Pattison
- Suzanne Stafford CQSW
- Camilla Tominey
- David Yelland
- Fergal Keane 2002–2009
- Mo Mowlam 1996–2005
- Diana Samways 1997–2011

== Ambassadors ==
- Arabella Byrne
- Josh Connelly
- Sarah Drage
- Lorri Haines
- Maya Parker
- Jaz Rai OBE
- Chanita Stephenson
- Aaron Willis
- Ceri Walker
- John Fenston
- Emma Spiegler

Trustees: Dr Anne-Marie Barron, Maya Parker MA Hon. (Treasurer), Laurence Alleyne, Jane Elson, Euan Graham, Katy Stafford (Chair of trustees)

== Consultative Council ==
- Child and Vulnerable Adult Protection – Clare Adams & Katie Wilson
- Clinical Advice – Peter Taberner
- Clinical Psychology and Family Therapy – John Friel & Jerry Moe
- Counselling & Therapy – Lois Evans
- Fiscal Probity – Keith Hall
- GP Liaison – Jacqueline Chang
- Helpline – James Galloway & Jessica Munafo
- Legal – Valerie McGee
- Press and Communications – Julia Goodwin, Virginia Ironside & Deidre Saunders
- Research – Martin Callingham

== International ==
Independent organisations have been set up around the world with similar aims. These include NACoA in the United States, NACOA Deutschland in Germany, Nacoa Brasil in Brazil and NACOA POLSKA in Poland.

== COA Week ==
Nacoa launched the first Children of Alcoholics Week (COA Week) in the UK in 2009. The week is held annually in February during the week in which Valentine's Day falls and is celebrated internationally. The campaign is intended to raise awareness of children affected by parental alcohol problems and the support available. Benefactors of the week include Nacoa's patrons and other people such as Belinda Carlisle, Sheila Hancock, Sir Ben Kingsley, Prue Leith, Cherie Lunghi, Marco Pierre White, Craig Revel Horwood, Kim Woodburn and Antony Worrall Thompson.

To celebrate COA Week 2011, Nacoa released their first charity single, a cover of the Sam Cooke classic ‘A change is gonna come’ sung by Maria McAteer (daughter of Al Timothy) with piano and arrangement by Bjorn Dahlberg and strings by the Stanford Quartet. The music video for the single made by Sean Caveille was filmed in Bristol and featured Nacoa volunteers.
