= National Association for Children of Addiction (United States) =

The National Association for Children of Addiction (NACoA) was formed in February 1983 in California, United States by 20 professionals concerned about the needs of family members of alcoholics. NACoA is a membership and affiliate organization, and is incorporated as a not-for-profit 501(c)(3) organization.

NACoA's mission is "to eliminate the adverse impact of alcohol and drug use on children and families". The founders believed that by coming together and building consensus, core issues could be identified and services needed by children of addiction (COAs) could be delivered and disseminated. In 1992, NACoA relocated its national office to the suburbs of Washington, D.C. to develop a stronger presence in the national policy and program arenas. NACoA partners with other national non-profit organizations, private-sector groups and federal agencies for policy and program development in substance abuse research, prevention and treatment to expand and enhance delivery of information for and about COAs.

NACoA programs are designed to educate professionals in primary health care, the faith communities, social work, education and the judicial communities, providing them with tools which will facilitate their ability to intervene and support children of alcoholic or drug-addicted parents. A toll-free telephone number provides information about the problem and what can be done to help. Nearly 50 affiliate members strengthen national outreach efforts. NACoA is the only organization working for children who have alcohol or other drug dependent parents on a national level.

== See also ==
- National Association for Children of Alcoholics (United Kingdom)

== Publications ==
- Abbott, Stephanie, Children of Alcoholics – Selected Readings. Rockville, MD (2000).
- Bowden and Gravitz, Guide to Recovery for Adult Children of Alcoholics and Other Trauma.
