= Timmen L. Cermak =

American psychiatrist

Timmen Cermak is an American psychiatrist who focuses on addiction medicine. He is in private practice in San Francisco and Marin County.

In the 1980s, Timmen unsuccessfully proposed that codependency be listed as a personality disorder in the Diagnostic and Statistical Manual of Mental Disorders.

== Education ==
- B.A., Philosophy, Ohio Wesleyan University
- M.D., Case Western Reserve University

== Certifications ==
- Diploma, American Board of Psychiatry and Neurology
- Certificate of Added Qualification in Addiction Psychiatry
- Certified by the American Society of Addiction Medicine
