= Professional Association of Therapeutic Horsemanship =

American nonprofit organization

Professional Association of Therapeutic Horsemanship International (PATH Intl.), formerly the North American Riding for the Handicapped Association (NARHA), is a non-profit organization based in Denver, Colorado, that promotes the benefits of therapeutic horseback riding and other equine-assisted activities and therapies for people disabilities. PATH Intl. is a 501(c)(3) organization.

As of December 31, 2018, there are 873 centers that are members of PATH Intl. and 4,776 certified professionals working in these centers. In addition, PATH has 61,642 and over 7,943 different equines are used. The centers and there staff and volunteers serve 68,929 adults and children with varying disabilities of which 6,724 are veterans.

== History ==
PATH international was originally formed in 1969 as the North American Riding for the Handicapped Association (NARHA) to promote equine-assisted activities for individuals with disabilities. The organization was created because a group of individuals realized that there should be some type of organization to help get information about therapeutic horseback riding out to the public. The name was changed in July 2011 to better reflect the mission of and the people served by PATH Intl.

When it was first created the NARHA had two main goals, accrediting centers and certifying instructors. The founding members of the NARHA wanted to ensure that equine assisted activity centers were being run properly and helping its participants gain benefits from the activities. Accrediting center and certifying instructors are still the core goals in the organization today.

== See also ==
- Equestrianism
- National Sports Center for the Disabled
