= Adult Children of Alcoholics & Dysfunctional Families =

Fellowship of people recovering from growing up in an alcoholic family

Adult Children of Alcoholics & Dysfunctional Families (ACA or ACOA) founded circa 1978 is a fellowship of people who desire to recover from the effects of growing up in an alcoholic or otherwise dysfunctional family. ACA membership has few formal requirements. ACA does not accept any outside contributions and is supported entirely by donations from its members. The organization is not related to any particular religion and has no political affiliation. Tony A. was among its co-founders and is the author of The Laundry List, 12 steps for adult children of alcoholics (known as "Tony A's 12 Steps"), The Problem, which are all published in his book, The Laundry List: The ACOA Experience (co-authored with Dan F.)

== Definition of "adult children" ==
The organization's name is often ascribed to Janet G. Woititz (c. 1939 – June 7, 1994), an American psychologist and researcher best known for her writings and lectures on the adult children of alcoholic parents, and author of the 1983 book Adult Children of Alcoholics.

The term ACoA was also extended to include PTSD by Tian Dayton, specifically in her book The ACoA Trauma Syndrome. In it she describes how pain from childhood emerges and gets played out in adulthood, for the ACoA, as a post-traumatic stress reaction. Childhood pain that has remained relatively dormant for decades can be re-stimulated or "triggered" by the dynamics of intimacy. "Just as a car backfiring triggers a soldier into unconscious memories of gunfire, when the ACoA grows up and enters the intimate relationships of partnering and parenting, the very vulnerability, dependency and closeness of those relationships can trigger unhealed and unconscious pain from childhood."

== History and growth of ACA/ACOA ==
ACA/ACOA was originally named "Post Teen" in Mineola, Long Island in 1973.

In the mid-1970s, a group of older Alateens in Manhattan, a part of the Al-Anon fellowship, formed a group of those who were looking for a group that was not focused on parental or spousal relationships with those dealing with alcohol substance abuse. They called this group Hope of Adult Children of Alcoholics. After being asked to speak on his experiences in Alcoholics Anonymous (AA) and Al-Anon to this group, Tony A. joined as a member. When fewer people were in attendance, Tony A. opened up the group to AA members who were adult children. Eventually, Tony started a co-current group called Generations which was not affiliated with any twelve-step group.

In 1978 Tony A. wrote The Laundry List (the 14 characteristics of adult children) and the Solution and shared it with his Generations group. The meeting where Tony A. shared his Laundry List is considered the beginning of ACA/ACOA. Members of "Generations" expressed discomfort with the AA steps around this time and also declined an offer to become an official Al-Anon group in the 1980s. Tony A. began working on a version of the 12 steps specifically for adult children of alcoholics, and published them in his 1991 book, The Laundry List: The ACOA Experience that he wrote with Dan F. Currently, ACA allows use of Tony A.'s 12 steps in addition to the AA-based 12 steps formally in ACA-approved literature.

This 12-step program is incorporated as Adult Children of Alcoholics/Dysfunctional Families. The ACA framework is based on the 12 steps and 12 traditions of AA.

During the 1990s, the organization went through rapid growth. In 1989, there were 1,300 ACA meetings and by 2003 there were an estimated 40,000 members of ACA. In 2014, there were 1,300 groups worldwide, about 780 of these in the USA. Although this isn't the full picture, as of November 3, 2024, globally there are 2,745 ACA meetings registered with ACA World Services.

== Organization and relation to other groups ==
ACA is organized along the lines of 12 steps and 12 traditions adopted by the ACA World Service Organization ACA meetings are formed without leaders and are maintained by group conscience and following the 12 steps of ACA/Tony A and traditions of ACA. Meetings are held with the principle of anonymity for members online, via phone, or in-person.

"The vast majority of ACAs meet informally, in school classrooms or church halls, in the evenings or over weekends. Few frequent expensive treatment centres. They are sympathetic to, but not part of, the AA movement. They meet in leaderless groups, pooling their resources of experience and insight, and reading relevant literature to deepen those assets. For an ACA, this support group provides the extended family and unconditional support which he or she never experienced. The group further provides practical help in acquiring everyday interpersonal and coping skills, and, with them, the sense of self-efficacy—a basic need, as Peele says. The group also provides a sense of community, a community of interest which there are few neighbourhood groups nowadays to provide. This sense of community is another basic need, as Peele argues. Membership comes from a felt need, not as a life sentence. AA puts it simply: 'People need people.'"

=== ACA program ===
From the ACA fellowship text (also known as "The Big Red Book"): "By attending these meetings on a regular basis, you will come to see parental alcoholism or family dysfunction for what it is: a disease that infected you as a child and continues to affect you as an adult."

The goal of working the program is emotional sobriety.

In 2006, ACA published a fellowship text of 646 pages, describing in details what the program is and how it works. This text is also called "The Big Red Book," mirroring the AA fellowship text being called "The Big Book" by members of AA.

ACA is a therapeutic program which emphasizes taking care of the self and reparenting one's own wounded inner child with love rather than focusing on one source of substance abuse (though members may or may not have substance abuse issues) as in other 12-step groups. Participants work to build oneself up, assume personal responsibility healthy living habits, and actively works on the changes necessary. The collective stance is not to wallow in "being a victim" but to move into the practical application of seeing family dysfunction as a generational affliction and a pattern that can be healed.

ACA does not rely heavily on a traditional "sponsor" format as in AA, although some may follow this format in ACA, but favors a "Fellow Traveler" approach that emphasizes learning from each other as you both work the program.

=== The 12 steps ===
ACA offers a program to recover from the effects of growing up in an alcoholic or otherwise dysfunctional family. It is not affiliated with AA, but it follows the 12-step structure and format of groups based on Alcoholics Anonymous. It features 12 steps adapted from the AA steps and 12 steps authored by co-founder, Tony A. (which have not been conference approved by the ACA WSO).

== Recommendations ==
Dr. Janet G. Woititz, author of Adult Children of Alcoholics, endorsed the ACA.

== See also ==
- Al-Anon/Alateen
- Alcoholism in family systems
- List of twelve-step groups
- Twelve-step program
- Self-help groups for mental health
