= David Stafford =

David Stafford may refer to:

- David Stafford (writer) (1949–2023), English writer and broadcaster
- David A. T. Stafford (born 1942), British historian
- David A. Stafford (1893–1959), United States Marine Corps general
- David Theophilus Stafford (1849–1926), planter, businessman, and sheriff in Central Louisiana
