= Community Oncology Alliance =

US non-profit organization

- Abbreviation: COA
- Formation: 2002
- Type: non profit organization
- Purpose: advocates for cancer patients
- Location: United States

The Community Oncology Alliance (COA) is a non-profit organization in the United States that advocates for patients with cancer and their providers in the independent, community oncology setting. There are more than 6,500 providers at 950 community cancer clinics that treat the majority of Americans with cancer.

Founded in 2002, COA works to increase awareness on Capitol Hill about the community cancer care delivery system and motivate oncology practices to become politically active. The organization also leads a number of health reform initiatives including a patient centered medical home tailored to oncology practices, a patient advocacy network, an oncology pharmacy manager association, and practice administrators network. COA also organizes an annual conference for community oncology practices, physicians, patients, and administrators.
