= Equine-assisted therapy =

Physical or mental therapy using horses

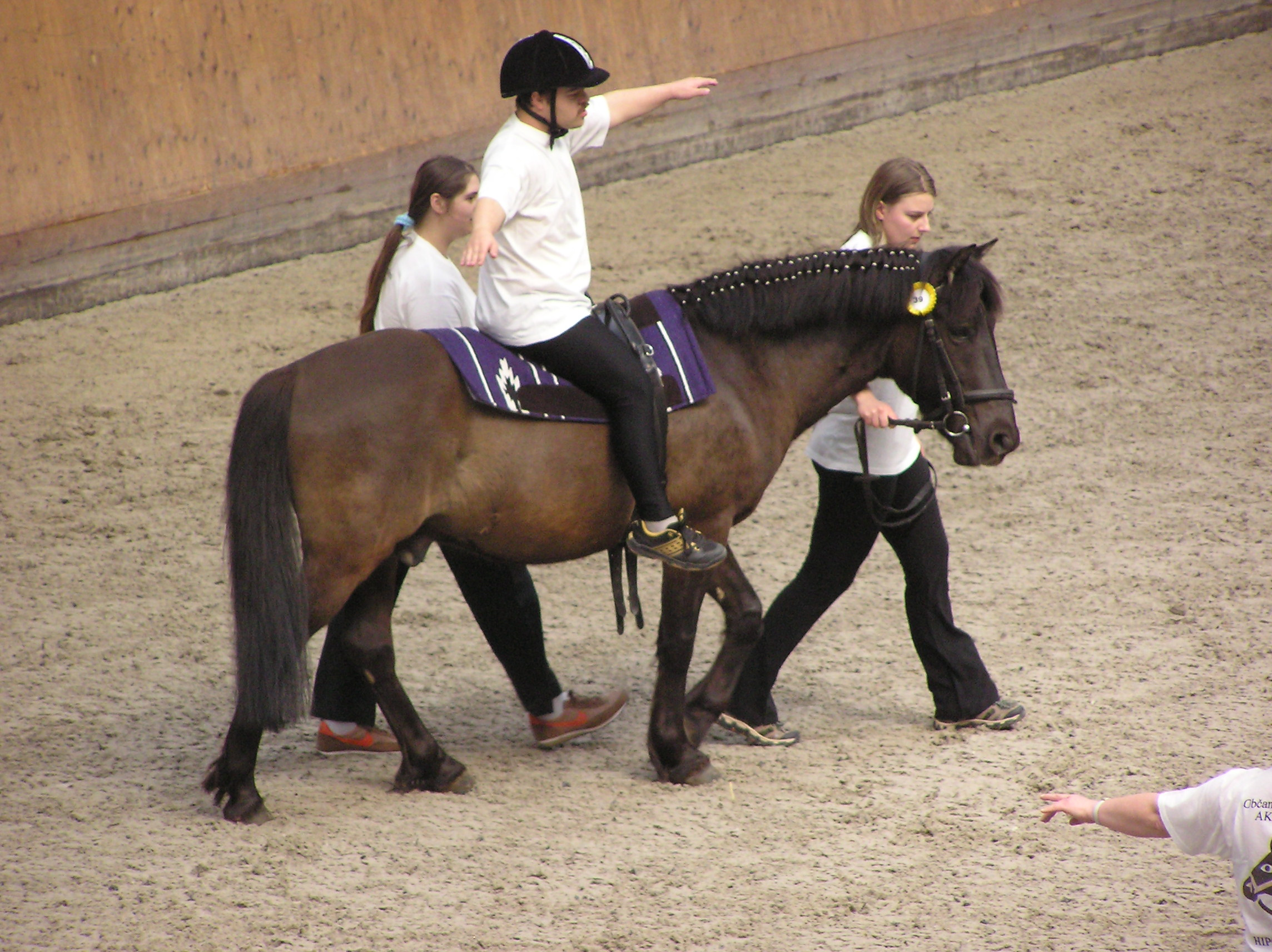
Equine-assisted therapy has been used by medical professionals such as occupational therapists, physical therapists, speech-language pathologists, psychologists, social workers, and recreational therapists

Equine-assisted therapy (EAT) encompasses a range of treatments that involve activities with horses and other equines to promote human physical and mental health. Modern use of horses for mental health treatment dates to the 1990s. Systematic review of studies of EAT as applied to physical health date only to about 2007, and a lack of common terminology and standardization has caused problems with meta-analysis. Due to a lack of high-quality studies assessing the efficacy of equine-assisted therapies for mental health treatment, concerns have been raised that these therapies should not replace or divert resources from other evidence-based mental health therapies. The existing body of evidence does not justify the promotion and use of equine-related treatments for mental disorders.

== Terminology ==
An overall term that encompasses all forms of equine therapy is equine-assisted activities and therapy (EAAT). Various therapies that involve interactions with horses and other equines are used for individuals with and without disabilities including those with physical, cognitive and emotional issues. Terminology within the field is not standardized, and the lack of clear definitions and common terminology presents problems in reviewing medical literature. Within that framework, the more common therapies and terminology used to describe them are:

- Therapeutic horseback riding uses a therapeutic team, usually including a certified therapeutic riding instructor, two or more volunteers, and a horse, to help an individual ride a horse and work with it on the ground.
- Hippotherapy involves an occupational therapist, a physiotherapist, or a speech and language therapist working with a client and a horse. Different movements of the horse present challenges to the client to promote different postural responses of the client by the horse influencing the client rather than the client controlling the horse. The word hippotherapy is also used in some contexts to refer to a broader realm of equine therapies.
- Equine-assisted learning (EAL) is described as an "experiential learning approach that promotes the development of life skills ... through equine-assisted activities."
- Equine-assisted psychotherapy (EAP) does not necessarily involve riding, but may include grooming, feeding and ground exercises. Mental health professionals work with one or more clients and one or more horses in an experiential manner to help the clients learn about themselves and others, while processing or discussing the client's feelings, behaviours, and patterns. The goal is to help the client in social, emotional, cognitive, or behavioral ways. Other terms for equine psychotherapy include equine-facilitated psychotherapy (EFP), equine-assisted therapy (EAT), equine-facilitated wellness (EFW), equine-facilitated counselling (EFC) and equine facilitated mental health (EFMH).
- Interactive vaulting involves vaulting activities in a therapeutic milieu.
- Therapeutic driving involves controlling a horse while driving from a carriage seat or from a wheelchair in a carriage modified to accommodate the wheelchair.
- Equine-assisted activities (EAA) incorporates all of the above activities plus horse grooming, and stable management, shows, parades, demonstrations, and the like.

== Types ==
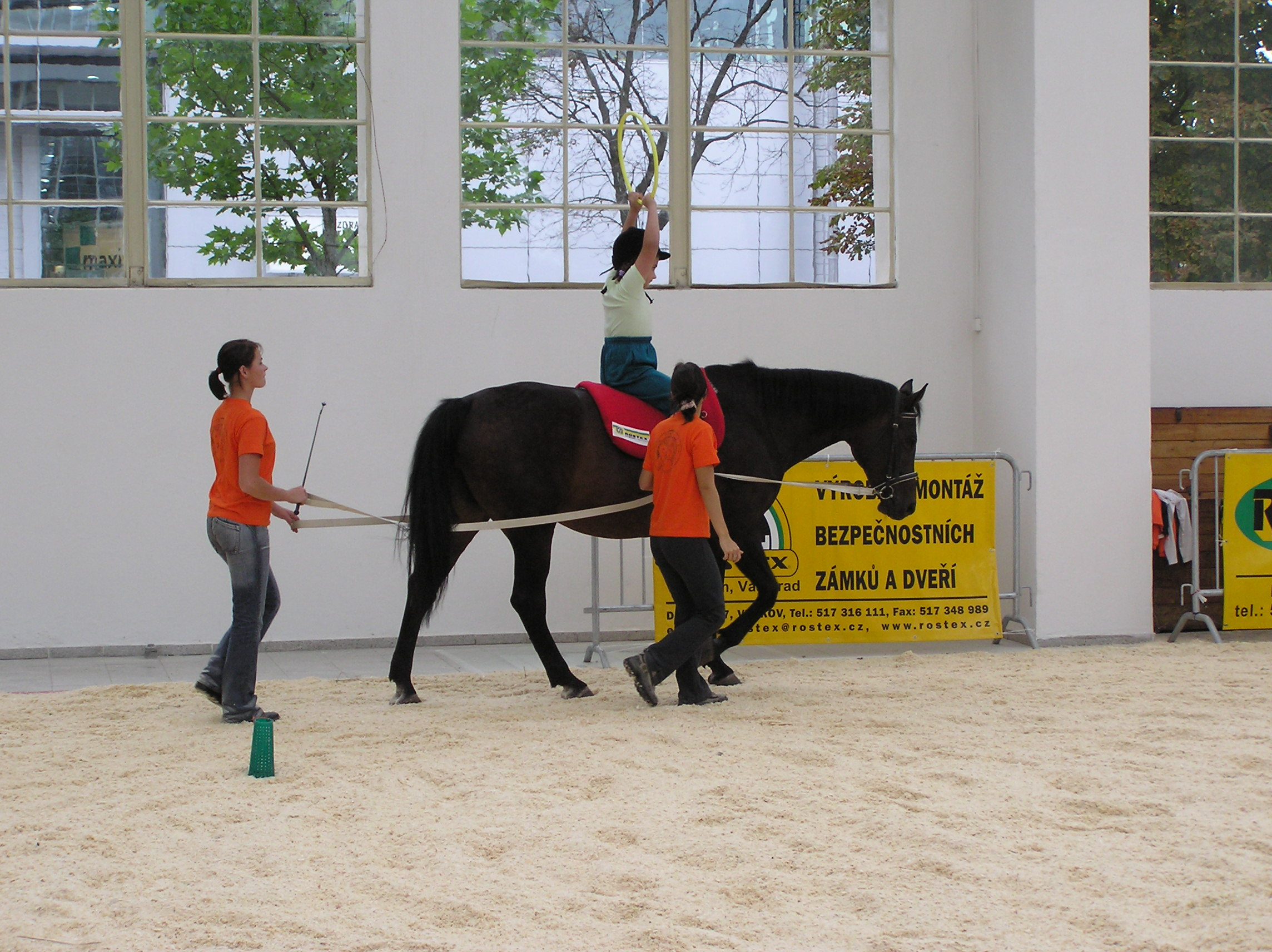
A demonstration of hippotherapy in the Czech Republic

Most research has focused on physical benefit of therapeutic work with horses, though the most rigorous studies have only been subject to systematic review since about 2007.

EAAT have been used to treat individuals with neurological diseases or disorders such as cerebral palsy, movement disorders, or balance problems. It is believed the rhythmical gait of a horse acts to move the rider's pelvis in the same rotation and side-to-side movement that occurs when walking; the horse's adjustable gait promotes riders to constantly adjust to encourage pelvic motion while promoting strength, balance, coordination, flexibility, posture, and mobility.

EAAT have also been used to treat other disabilities, such as autism, behavioral disorders and psychiatric disorders. Due to a lack of rigorous scientific evidence, there is insufficient evidence to demonstrate if equine therapy for mental health treatment provides any benefit.

=== Therapeutic horseback riding ===
Therapeutic riding is used by disabled individuals who ride horses to relax, and to develop muscle tone, coordination, confidence, and well-being.

Therapeutic horseback riding is considered recreational therapy where an individual is taught by a non-therapist riding instructor how to actively control a horse while riding. It is used as exercise to improve sensory and motor skills for coordination, balance, and posture.

Most research has focused on the physical benefit of therapeutic work with horses, with the most rigorous studies being subject to systematic review since about 2007. Claims made as to the efficacy of equine therapies for mental health purposes have been criticized as lacking proper medical evidence due in large part to poor study design and lack of quantitative data. Ethical questions relating to its expense and its continued promotion have been raised in light of this lack of evidence. While such therapies do not appear to cause harm, it has been recommended they not be used as a mental treatment at this time unless future evidence shows a benefit for treating specific disorders.

=== Hippotherapy ===
Hippotherapy is an intervention used by a physical therapist, recreational therapist, occupational therapist, or speech and language pathologist. The movement of the horse affects a rider's posture, balance, coordination, strength and sensorimotor systems. It is thought that the warmth and shape of the horse and its rhythmic, three-dimensional movement along with the rider's interactions with the horse and responses to the movement of the horse can improve the flexibility, posture, balance and mobility of the rider. Learning to use verbal cues for the horse, and to speak with the therapist is key to practicing use of speech. It differs from therapeutic horseback riding because it is one treatment strategy used by a licensed physical therapist, occupational therapist, or speech and language pathologists. They guide the rider's posture and actions while the horse is controlled by a horse handler at the direction of the therapist. The therapist guides both the rider and horse to encourage specific motor and sensory inputs. Therapists develop plans to address specific limitations and disabilities such as neuromuscular disorders, walking ability, or general motor function.

=== Equine-assisted psychotherapy ===
Equine-assisted psychotherapy (EAP) or equine-facilitated psychotherapy (EFP) is the use of equines to treat human psychological problems in and around an equestrian facility. It is not the same as therapeutic riding or hippotherapy. Though different organizations may prefer one term over the other for various reasons, in practice, the two terms are used interchangeably. Other terms commonly used, especially in Canada, include equine-facilitated wellness (EFW), equine-facilitated counselling (EFC) and equine-facilitated mental health (EFMH).

While some mental health therapies may incorporate vaulting and riding, some utilize groundwork with horses. Some programs only use ground-based work. There are also differences between programs over whether the horse is viewed as a co-facilitator, or simply as a tool.

The field of equine-assisted psychotherapy did not publicly become a part of the equine-assisted therapy world until the 1990s, although individuals had been experimenting with the concept prior to that time. The first national group in the United States, the Equine-Facilitated Mental Health Association (EFMHA), now a part of PATH International, formed in 1996. The mental health area of equine-assisted therapy became subject to a major rift when a second group, the Equine Growth and Learning Association (EAGALA) formed in 1999, splitting from EFMHA (now PATH) over differences of opinion about safety protocols. Since that time, additional differences have arisen between the two groups over safety orientation, the therapeutic models used, training programs for practitioners, and the role of riding. EAGALA itself had a further split between its founders in 2006 due to legal issues, with yet another new organization formed.

As a result, although PATH and EAGALA remain the two main certification organizations in the United States, there has been a significant amount of misunderstanding amongst practitioners, client, and within the scientific literature. To resolve these differences, an independent organization, the Certification Board for Equine Interaction Professionals (CBEIP) formed, beginning in 2007, to promote professional credibility in the field. However, the world of equine-assisted psychotherapy remains disorganized and has not standardized its requirements for education or credentialing.

== History ==
Horses have been utilized as a therapeutic aid since the ancient Greeks used them for those people who had incurable illnesses. Its earliest recorded mention is in the writings of Hippocrates who discussed the therapeutic value of riding. The claimed benefits of therapeutic riding have been dated back to 17th century literature where it is documented that it was prescribed for gout, neurological disorder and low morale. In 1946 Equine Therapy was introduced in Scandinavia after an outbreak of poliomyelitis.

Hippotherapy, as currently practiced was developed in the 1960s, when it began to be used in Germany, Austria, and Switzerland as an adjunct to traditional physical therapy. The treatment was conducted by a physiotherapist, a specially trained horse, and a horse handler. The physiotherapist gave directives to the horse handler as to the gait, tempo, cadence, and direction for the horse to perform. The first standardized hippotherapy curriculum would be formulated in the late 1980s by a group of Canadian and American therapists who travelled to Germany to learn about hippotherapy and would bring the new discipline back to North America upon their return. The discipline was formalized in the United States in 1992 with the formation of the American Hippotherapy Association (AHA). Since its inception, the AHA has established official standards of practice and formalized therapist educational curriculum processes for occupational, physical and speech therapists in the United States.

At about 1952, in Germany, therapeutic riding was used to address orthopaedic dysfunctions such as scoliosis. The first riding centers in North America began in the 1960s and the North American Riding for the Handicapped Association (NARHA) was launched in 1969. Therapeutic riding was introduced to the United States and Canada in 1960 with the formation of the Community Association of Riding of the Disabled (CARD). In the United States riding for disabled people developed as a form of recreation and as a means of motivation for education, as well as its therapeutic benefits. In 1969 the Cheff Therapeutic Riding Center for the Handicapped was established in Michigan, and remains the oldest center specifically for people with disabilities in the United States.

The North American Riding for Handicapped Association (NARHA) was founded in 1969 to serve as an advisory body to the various riding for disabled groups across the United States and its neighboring countries. In 2011, NARHA changed its name to the Professional Association of Therapeutic Horsemanship (PATH) International.

== Horses used ==
In most cases, horses are trained and selected specifically for therapy before being integrated into a program. Therapy programs choose horses of any breed that they find to be calm, even-tempered, gentle, serviceably sound, and well-trained both under saddle and on the ground. As most equine-assisted therapy is done at slow speeds, an older horse that is not in its athletic prime is sometimes used.

Equine-assisted therapy programs try to identify horses that are calm but not lazy and physically suited with proper balance, structure, muscling and gaits. Muscling is not generally considered to be as important as the balance and structural correctness, but proper conditioning for the work it is to do is required. Suitable horses move freely and have good quality gaits, especially the walk. Unsound horses that show any signs of lameness are generally avoided.

The welfare of the horse is taken into consideration. Each individual animal has natural biological traits but also has a unique personality with its own likes, dislikes and habits. Paying attention to what the animal is trying to communicate is helpful both in sessions of EAAT, but also to prevent burnout for the horse. Some programs refer to the therapy horse as an "equine partner". Other programs view the horse as a "metaphor" with no defined role other than to "be themselves." Equine-facilitated wellness programs, particularly those following the EFW-Canada certification route view the horse as 'sentient being': "The equine is a sentient being, partner and co-facilitator in the equine facilitated relationship and process".

== Effectiveness ==
There is currently insufficient medical evidence to support the effectiveness of equine-related treatments for mental health. Multiple reviews have noted problems with the quality of research such as the lack of independent observers, rigorous randomized clinical trials, longitudinal studies, and comparisons to currently accepted and effective treatments. A 2014 review found these treatments did no physical harm, but found that all studies examined had methodological flaws, which led to questioning the clinical significance of those studies; the review also raised ethical concerns both about the marketing and promotion of the practice and the opportunity cost if patients in need of mental health services were diverted from evidence-based care. The review recommended that both individuals and organizations avoid this therapy unless future research establishes verifiable treatment benefits.

There is some evidence that hippotherapy can help improve the posture control of children with cerebral palsy, although the use of mechanical hippotherapy simulators produced no clear evidence of benefit. A systematic review of studies on the outcomes of horseback riding therapy on gross motor function in children with cerebral palsy was concluded in 2012 with a recommendation for a "large randomized controlled trial using specified protocols" because the studies were too limited to be considered conclusive.

Overall, reviews of equine-assisted therapy scientific literature indicate "there is no unified, widely accepted, or empirically supported, theoretical framework for how and why these interventions may be therapeutic". The journal Neurology published a 2014 study finding inadequate data to know whether hippotherapy or therapeutic horseback riding can help the gait, balance, or mood of people with multiple sclerosis. Newer studies have found hippotherapy paired with traditional treatment can increase balance and quality of life in individuals with multiple sclerosis. There is no evidence that therapeutic horseback riding is effective in treating children with autism.

== Accreditation and certification ==
In Canada, centers and instructors for Therapeutic Riding are regulated by CanTRA, also known as The Canadian Therapeutic Riding Association. The field of equine-facilitated wellness is regulated by Equine Facilitated Wellness – Canada (EFW-Can) which provides a national certification program and certifies trainers and mentors to provide independent training at approved programs across Canada.

In the UK there are a growing number of training providers offering externally accredited equine-assisted and facilitated qualifications. There is currently no overarching regulating body in the UK. Some organisations are specifically offering therapeutic or coaching based approaches; others offer skills-based approaches which building on existing professional skills and practices.

In the US, the Professional Association of Therapeutic Horsemanship (PATH) accredits centers and instructors that provide equine-assisted therapy. The Equine Assisted Growth and Learning Association (EAGALA) focuses only on mental health aspects of human-equine interaction, and provides certification for mental-health and equine professionals. The American Hippotherapy Association offers certification for working as a hippotherapist.

== See also ==
- Occupational therapy
- Physiotherapy
- Riding for the Disabled Association (UK)
- Professional Association of Therapeutic Horsemanship (PATH) (US)
- Horseback riding simulators
- Wagon-bed riding

=== Notable examples ===
- Smoke the Donkey
