= Janet G. Woititz =

American Psychologist

Janet Beigel Geringer Woititz
- Born: Janet Geringer; March 27, 1938; Great Neck, New York, U.S.
- Died: June 7, 1994 (aged 56); Roseland, New Jersey, U.S.
- Education: Antioch College, Rutgers University
- Occupation: Psychologist
- Known for: Book: Adult Children of Alcoholics
- Children: David, Daniel, Lisa

Janet Beigel Geringer Woititz (March 27, 1938 – June 7, 1994) was an American psychologist and researcher best known for her writings and lectures about the troubled offspring of alcoholic parents, including the 1983 best selling book, Adult Children of Alcoholics.

== Biography ==
Woititz was born Janet Geringer in Great Neck, New York in 1938. She earned a bachelor's degree from Antioch College and a master's at Montclair State College (since renamed to Montclair State University), where she taught as an adjunct professor. In 1976, she received her doctorate in education at Rutgers University, where during summer she taught at the Rutgers Center for Alcoholic Studies.

In 1983, Health Communications published Woititz's book, Adult Children of Alcoholics, a trade book that reached best sellers lists. In that text, she highlighted typical patterns that might be found in the families of alcoholics, including an adult's lack of self-esteem and difficulty relating to others. After an expanded edition was printed in 1990, eventually selling 1.8 million copies in English, it was translated into six foreign languages.

Woititz provided a foundation for an organization called Adult Children of Alcoholics (sometimes abbreviated ACoA or ACA and now titled "Adult Children of Alcoholics/Dysfunctional Families") but she was not an official founder of it.

In 1985, she published her second best selling book called Struggle for Intimacy, of which nearly one million copies were sold in the first year.

Woititz founded the Institute for Counseling and Training of West Caldwell, New Jersey, and served as its president. At the Institute, patients could find therapeutic counseling for problems and disorders ranging from relationships to overeating and other disorders. In addition to her many books and journal publications, Woititz also lectured in the United States and abroad.

She died of cancer on June 7, 1994, at the age of 55, at her home in Roseland, New Jersey.

== Selected publications ==
- Woititz, Janet G. Adult children of alcoholics. Health Communications, Inc., 1983.
- Woititz, Janet G. Struggle for intimacy. Health Communications, Inc., 1985.
- Woititz, Janet Geringer. "Home away from home." Health Communications, Inc., 1987.
- Woitiz, Janet G. Healing your sexual self. Health Communications, 1989.
- Woititz, Janet G. Self-sabotage syndrome: Adult children in the workplace. Health Communications, Inc., 1989.
- Woititz, Janet G. Adult children of alcoholics: expanded edition. Health Communications, Inc., 1990.
- Woititz, Janet G. The complete Acoa sourcebook: Adult children of alcoholics at home, at work and in love. Health Communications, Inc., 2002.
- Woititz, Janet G. "Alcoholism and the family: A survey of the literature." Journal of Alcohol and Drug Education (1978).
- Woititz, Janet G., and Alan Garner. Lifeskills for adult children. Simon and Schuster, 2012.
- Woititz, Janet G., "The Intimacy Struggle" Health Communications, Inc. 1993.

== See also ==
- Adult Children of Alcoholics & Dysfunctional Families
