= Nar-Anon =

Twelve-step program

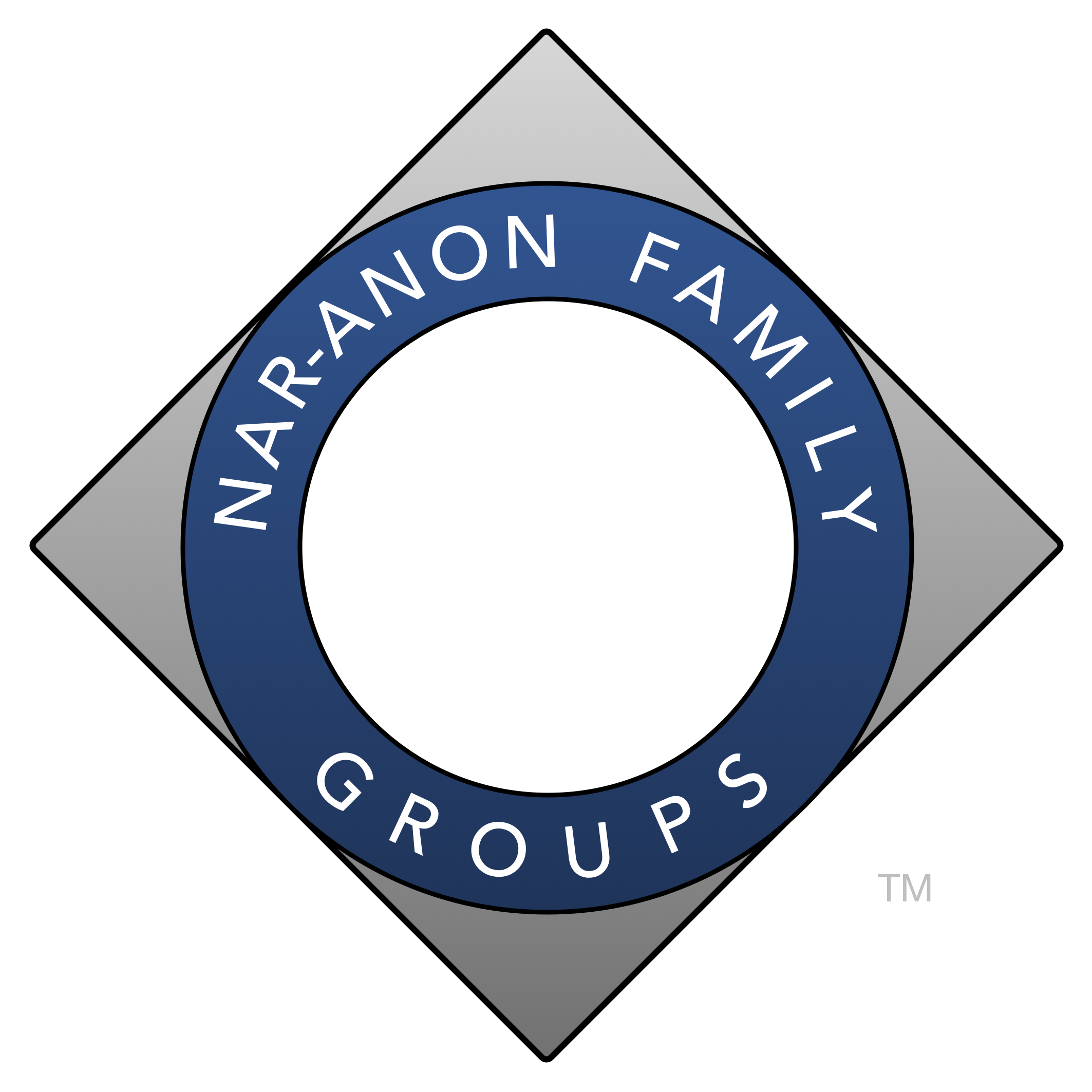
Nar-Anon Family Groups logo

Nar-Anon, known officially as "Nar-Anon Family Groups", is a twelve-step program for friends and family members of those who are affected by someone else's addiction. Nar-Anon is complementary to, but separate from, Narcotics Anonymous (NA), analogous to Al-Anon with respect to Alcoholics Anonymous; Nar-Anon's traditions state that it should "always cooperate with Narcotics Anonymous."

Nar-Anon was co-founded by Alma B. and Louise S. in Studio City, California, but their attempt to launch the program failed. The organization was revived in 1968 in the Palos Verdes Peninsula by Louise S. and others. Nar-Anon filed Articles of Incorporation in 1971, and in 1986 established the Nar-Anon World Service Office (WSO) in San Pedro, California.
