= Aeolus Cave =

Cave in Vermont, US

- Mount Aeolus Cave, Dorset Bat Cave
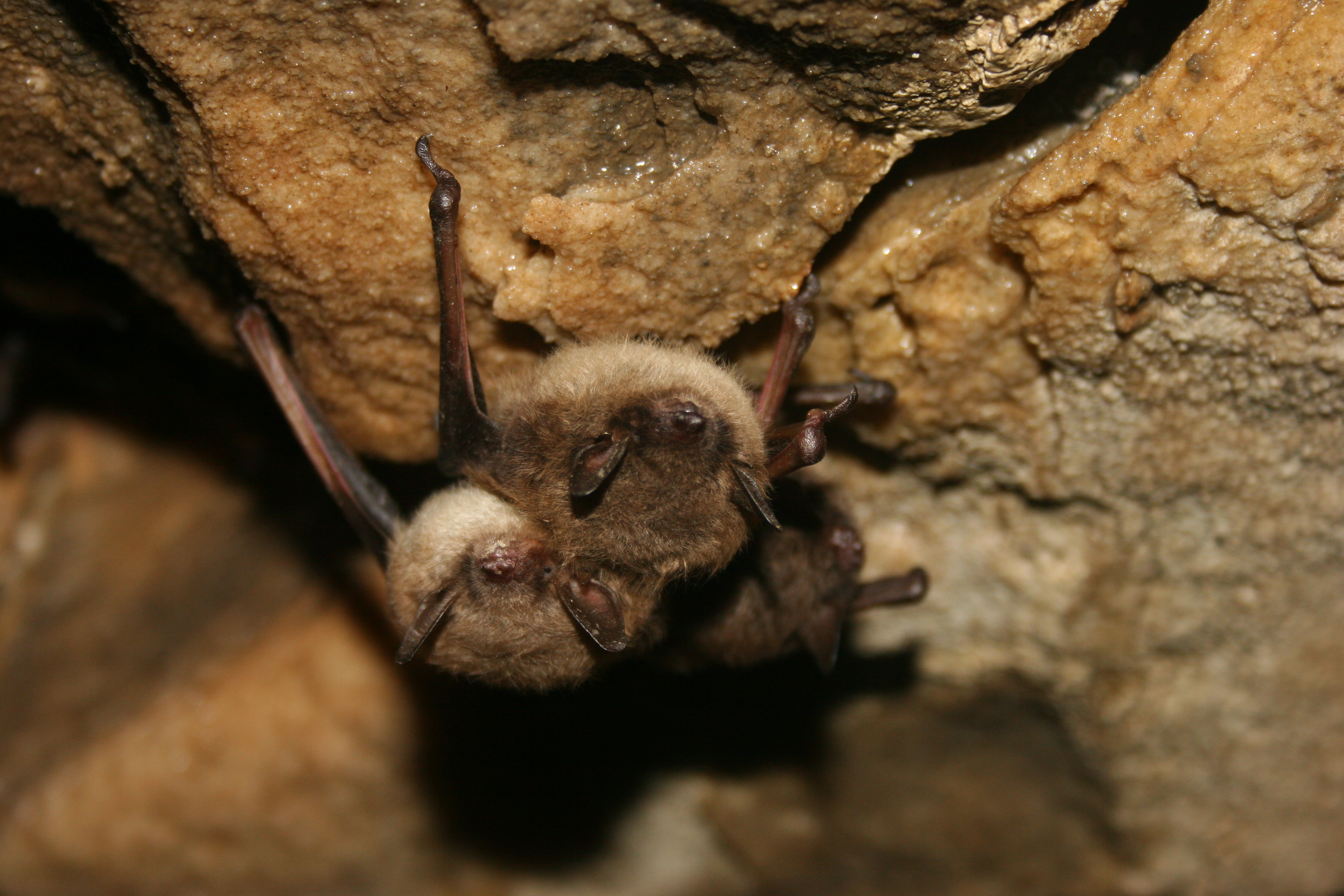
- Little brown bat at Aeolus Cave

- Location within Vermont Location within the United States
- Location: East Dorest, Vermont, US
- Coordinates: 43°14′02″N 73°01′46″W
- Length: 3,077 feet (938 m)
- Elevation: 2,520 feet (770 m)
- Geology: Marble
- Access: Closed
- Features: Bat hibernaculum, calcite formations

Aeolus Cave or Dorset Bat Cave is a marble solutional cave, located 2,520 feet (770 m) up in the Taconic Mountains near East Dorset, Vermont, United States. Alternate names that have shown up in the literature include Aeolus Cave, Mount Aeolus Cave, and Dorset Bat Cave. The largest cave in New England, Aeolus Cave was noted for being the largest bat hibernaculum in the northeastern United States before white nose syndrome almost completely destroyed its bat population.

== Geology and description ==
Aeolus Cave is a solutional cave, created by the dissolution of marble by water. Caves in New England are typically small due to the ancient thrust faulting resulting in soluble rocks being separated by large bands of insoluble rock, thus Aeolus Cave's 3,077 feet (938 m) of passages makes it the largest cave in New England. Aeolus Cave's large speleothems, the cave's placement 1,600 feet (490 m) above the valley floor, and cave apparently not being part of the present hydrologic cycle points to the cave predating the Last Glacial Period.

The cave is unusual in Vermont for not only its size but also its complexity. The cave has multiple levels, with several large rooms as well as tight crawls and chimneys. The cave is richly decorated with speleothems, with largest room, Tallow Hall, named for of its massive flowstone formations. Other speleothems in the cave include soda straws, stalagmites and stalactites, rimstone and cave pearls. The cave was popular with cavers in the area before its closure due to white nose syndrome.

== Bat hibernaculum ==
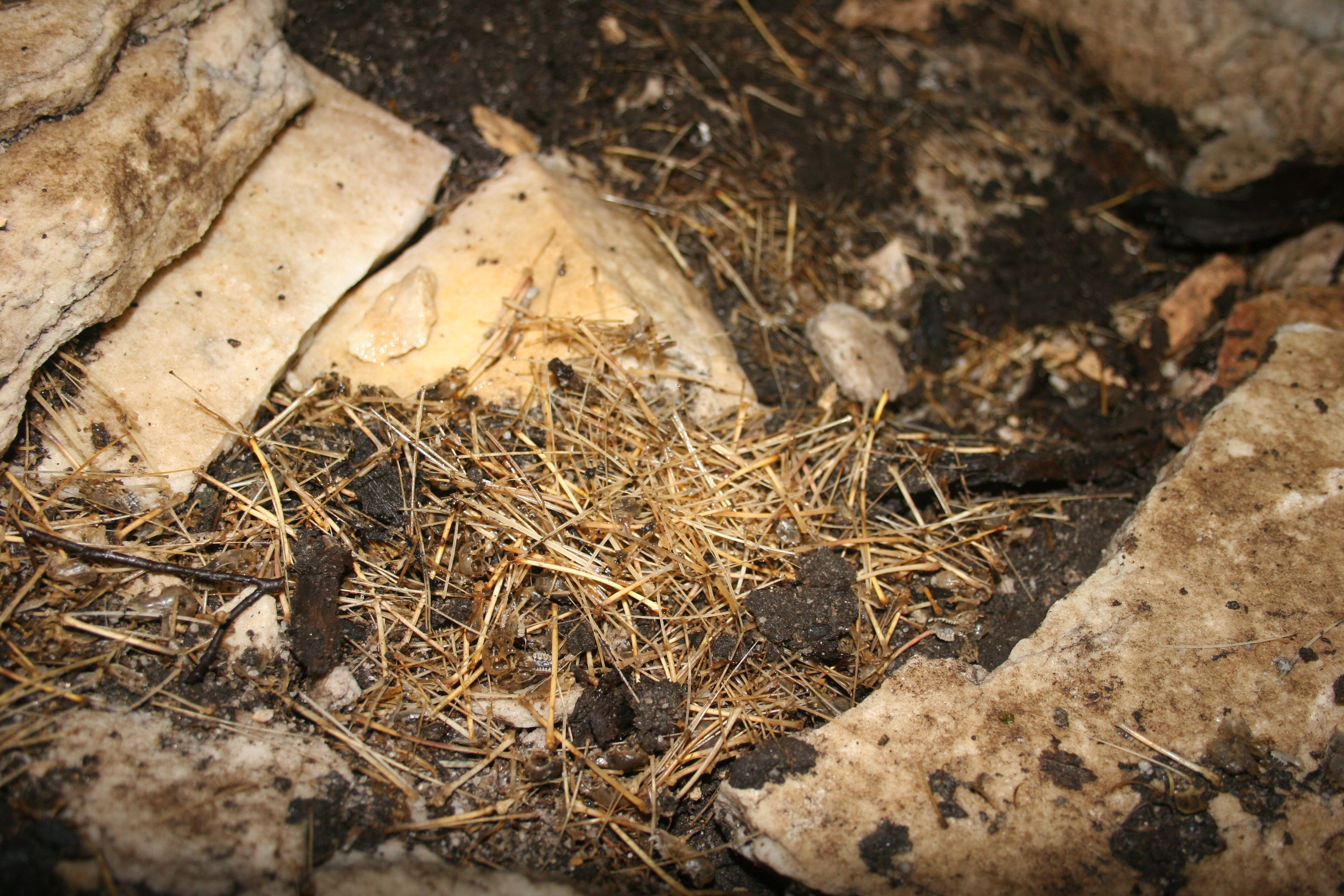
Bat bones inside the cave

Before white nose syndrome devastated its bat population, Aeolus Bat Cave was noted for being the largest bat hibernaculum in the northeastern United States. In 1965, an estimated 300,000 bats resided in the cave, although 2003 census suggested a lower number of about 23,000.

White nose syndrome spread to the cave by the winter of 2008. The bat population rapidly plummeted, with tens of thousands of dead and dying bats covering the cave floor. the stench of the decaying bats was described as "overwhelming", and a visitor described the Exxon Valdez oil spill "paling" to the sight of the cave. In 2011, a group of researchers were only able to find thirty three little brown bats and two brown long-eared bats alive.

By 2019, the bat population in the cave had recovered to about 70,000 to 90,000 bats.
