= Mark Whalon =

American poet

John Mark Whalon (June 16, 1886 (Note: The August 6, 1886 birth date given in Whalon's obituary is an error.) – September 14, 1956) was an American poet and author, known for his Vermont-themed poetry, opinion pieces, and humorous essays. He was also a close friend of Bill Wilson, founder of Alcoholics Anonymous, and was an influential mentor and confidant to Wilson throughout his life.

== Early life and education ==
Whalon was born in East Dorset, Vermont in 1886, and lived most of his life in the town. His parents were William C. and Rose Kelleher Whalon, and his father worked in the local marble industry.

In 1904 he graduated from Burr and Burton Seminary (later renamed Burr and Burton Academy), a boarding and day school in nearby Manchester, Vermont. Afterwards he attended the University of Vermont, although he never graduated.

== Career ==
As a young man, Whalon's employment included working at the town's General Store, working in the local marble quarries, working as a lumberjack, and working as a lineman for the telephone company.

During World War I, he served as an aerial photographer for the 1102nd Aero Squadron.

After the war, he returned to his hometown of East Dorset, and from 1925 to 1950 was the mail carrier throughout the Valley of Vermont.

Whalon was also a poet. By 1925 he had published poems in the weekly Manchester Journal.

By 1928 he was publishing his poems regularly in Vermont's second-largest daily newspaper, the Rutland Daily Herald, in that paper's "Peregrinations" poetry column. Some of these poems were also reprinted in The Boston Globe. One of his 1935 poems in the Rutland Daily Herald, "Just Livin' on a Margin", was a rare literary commentary about the eugenics movement then prevalent in Vermont in the wake of the decline of its marble and lumber industries, and about the New Deal's Resettlement Administration.

In 1933, he published a 60-page illustrated volume of his poetry, titled Rural Peace. Manchester poet Walter Hard said of it, "Mark Whalon has taken some real Vermont sap, from the right kind of trees, and has boiled it down to produce an honest and delicious Vermont product. One taste and you'll want some more." The Burlington Free Press wrote "There is said to be a lot of Vermont in a little volume of poetry called Rural Peace by Mark Whalon .... The homely themes of the farmhouse, the fields, the back road and the night skies are the basis of many of the poems."

Whalon wrote a variety of prose opinion pieces and humorous essays for the Rutland Daily Herald, in his Me Myself – Mostly column. He also had humorous essays published in Yankee magazine.

In 1942, he published a 135-page illustrated semi-autobiographical collection of Vermont-related essays and observations, Rural Free Delivery: Recollections of a Rural Mailman. The Rutland Daily Herald said of it, "There is a lot in it that is pure hooey and was intended to be, but there is more that has the sharp barb of truth and hits where it hurts. The unorthodox treatment of some of Vermont's most cherished traditions and possessions will not be kindly received by those who are accustomed to the reverent approach." The Burlington Free Press review said, "There are amusing pages on the legislature and legislators, maple sugar making, town meeting, butchering day, panthers and catamounts, tombstones and poetry, even the hole in the donut gets its share of the fun. Mr. Whalon airs his mind humorously and with vigor and there is none of the average Vermonter's understatement of things." Publishers Weekly called the "in the vernacular" book a "rollicking story".

In 1943 Whalon was the subject of a Life magazine photo-essay by photographer Alfred Eisenstaedt. The photo-essay follows Whalon on his mail route – in below-zero winter temperatures, deep snow, and conditions that included one impassable road – from his leaving the post office to begin the route to his curling up in an armchair in his cottage after finishing it.

== Influence on Bill Wilson ==
Whalon and Bill Wilson both grew up in East Dorset, Vermont, and had met by 1908. Nine and a half years Wilson's senior, Whalon was Wilson's closest childhood friend; he introduced him to the world of ideas, and was a lifelong mentor.

Whalon knew everyone in town and showed Wilson the ropes. He also drove Wilson around in the General Store delivery wagon to view the wealthy segment of the region. The two friends discussed books and literature, ideas, class, wealth, social and socio-economic strata, political philosophy, local and world politics, spirituality, and democracy.

They worked together on summer jobs and helped string the first telephone lines into East Dorset. They hunted and fished together, and shared an interest in Vermont history.

Whalon continued to be a mentor, confidant, counselor, and emotional support to Wilson, even after Wilson became world famous, and as of his death in 1956 was still Wilson's best friend. Wilson later wrote of him, "He was a sort of uncle or father to me."

== Personal life ==
By mid September 1922 Whalon was married to Kathleen Mitchell. They had two sons, Lawrence J. Whalon and Cornelius Bayard Whalon. The couple separated in the summer of 1932, and the marriage was annulled in 1933 after Kathleen murdered their five-year-old son Cornelius in an attempted murder-suicide poisoning.

By the 1950s, Whalon had developed Parkinson's disease. He died at the age of 70 in a nursing home in Bennington, Vermont, in 1956 following a long illness.

At the time of his death he had seven grandchildren.

== Bibliography ==
- Whalon, Mark (1933). Rural Peace. Rutland, Vermont: Tuttle Company. OCLC 6641494
- Whalon, Mark (1942). Rural Free Delivery: Recollections of a Rural Mailman. Brattleboro, Vermont: Stephen Daye Press. OCLC 1823455
