= Oath of a Freeman =

1630s loyalty pledge

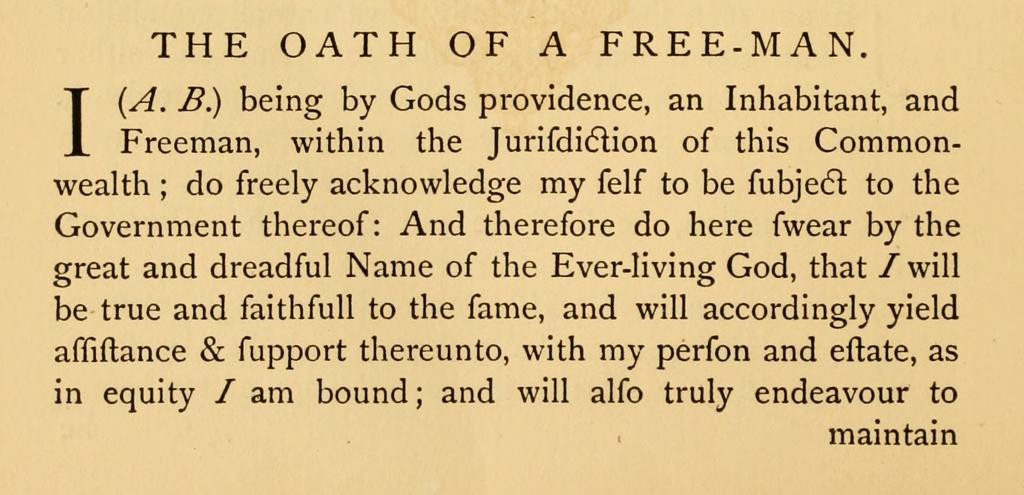
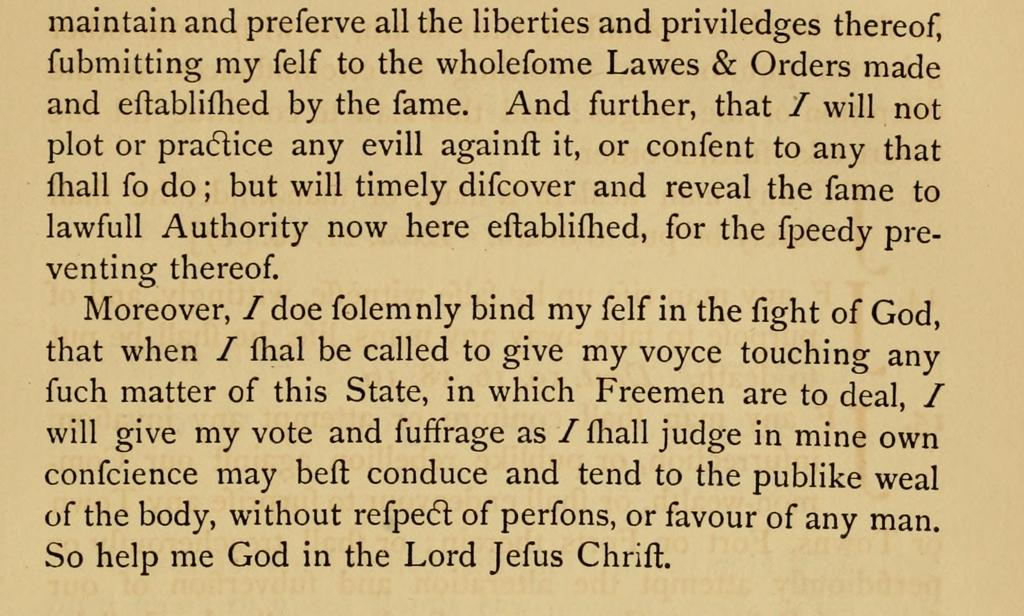
"The Oath of a Free-Man" from New-England’s Jonas Cast Up at London (1647), pages 24-25

The “Oath of a Freeman” was a loyalty pledge required of all new members of the Massachusetts Bay Colony in the 1630s. Printed as a broadside by Stephen Daye in 1639, it is the first document from a printing press known to have been produced in the present day United States. No copies are known to exist, but the text is known from a handwritten copy and two books, New-England’s Jonas Cast Up at London (1647) and Massachusetts's General Lawes and Libertyes (1648).

A supposed original printing of the document surfaced in 1985, but it was later revealed to be the work of forger Mark Hofmann.

== Original printing ==
The “Oath” was a vow of obedience to the company's government and a promise not to conspire against it. Previous examples of oaths in England pledged loyalty to the Crown. The absence of references to the King made the “Oath” a uniquely American document. The earliest known version of the “Oath” was handwritten by Massachusetts Bay Governor John Winthrop in 1631. Governor Winthrop stated in his diary that the “Oath” was the “first thing” printed by Stephen Daye in 1638 or 1639. Stephen Daye was an English locksmith who sailed to Boston in 1638 with a Puritan cleric Joss Glover, who had brought a printing press on board the ship to install in Cambridge, Massachusetts, for the use of the new college there, later named Harvard. After the cleric died at sea, his wife Elizabeth Glover set up the press, likely with Daye and his son Mathew operating it. Before 1638, all printed materials in America were produced in England and shipped across the Atlantic. The earliest known American imprint that had been found prior to 1685 was the Bay Psalm Book, which Daye printed in 1640. Daye's printing of the “Oath” had not been reported as seen since 1647, and according to historian Lawrence C. Wroth, “the probability that one will some day be found has never ceased to excite the New England collector.”

== Content of the Oath ==
The 1631 version of the oath reads:

I, A. B. &c. being by the Almighty's most wise dispostion become a member of this body, consisting of the Governor, Deputy Governor, Assistants and Commonalty of the Massachusetts in New England, do freely and sincerely acknowledge that I am justly and lawfully subject to the Government of the same, and do accordingly submit my person and estate to be protected, ordered and governed by the laws and constitutions thereof, and do faithfully promise to be from time to time obedient and conformable thereunto, and to the authority of the said Governor and Assistants, and their successors, and to all such laws, orders, sentences and decrees as shall be lawfully made and published by them or their successors. And I will always endeavor (as in duty I am bound) to advance the peace and welfare of this body or commonwealth, to my utmost skill and ability. And I will, to my best power and means, seek to divert and prevent whatsoever may tend to ruin or damage thereof, or of any the said Governor, Deputy Governor, or Assistants, or any of them, or their successors, and will give speedy notice to them, or some of them, of any sedition, violence, treachery, or other hurt or evil, which I shall know, hear, or vehemently suspect, to be plotted or intended against the said commonwealth, or the said Government established. And I will not, at any time, suffer or give consent to any counsel or attempt, that shall be offered, given, or attempted, for the impeachment of the said Government, or making any change or alteration of the same, contrary the laws and ordinances thereof; but shall do my utmost endeavor to discover, oppose and hinder all and every such counsel and attempt. So help me God.

The later 1634 version of the oath was the basis of the first printed version (1639), which was the first document in Cambridge, Massachusetts. The 1634 version reads:

I (A.B.) being by Gods providence, an Inhabitant, and Freeman, within the jurisdiction of this Commonwealth; do freely acknowledge my self to be subject to the Government thereof: And therefore do here swear by the great and dreadful Name of the Ever-living God, that I will be true and faithfull to the same, and will accordingly yield assistance & support thereunto, with my person and estate, as in equity I am bound; and will also truly endeavor to maintain and preserve all the liberties and priviledges thereof, submitting my self to the wholesome Lawes & Orders made and established by the same. And further, that I will not plot or practice any and reveal the same to lawfull Authority now here established, for the speedy preventing thereof. Moreover, I doe solemnly bind my self in the sight of God, that when I shal be called to give my voyce touching any matter of this State, in which Freemen are to deal, I will give my vote and suffrage as I shall judge in mine own conscience may best conduce and tend to the publike weal of the body, So help me God in the Lord Jesus Christ.

== 20th century forgery and aftermath ==
Mark Hofmann's 1985 forgery of "The Oath of a Freeman"

The break from English monarchy, combined with the document's status as the first document printed in America, conferred a special status on the “Oath”. Thus, there was considerable interest when a rare-documents dealer, Mark Hofmann, claimed to have found a broadside of the “Oath” in a New York bookstore in 1985. In 1985, Hofmann's print of the “Oath” was offered for sale to both the Library of Congress and the American Antiquarian Society, at a reported asking price of US$1.5 million. Further forged copies of the Oath printed by Hofmann were sold to private individuals, as well. The Library of Congress declared that the discovery “would be one of the most important and exciting finds of the century” and stated that its examination “found nothing inconsistent with a mid-17th century attribution”. The American Antiquarian Society had possession of the document for two months and announced, “as far as we know, there are no anomalies”. Both organizations wanted to undertake further testing of the “Oath” to determine its authenticity and remained interested in acquiring the document despite some troubling events after its discovery.

In fact, the purported discovery was a clever forgery by Hofmann. The deception began to unravel when Steven Christensen, a prominent leader in the Church of Jesus Christ of Latter-day Saints (LDS Church) and one of Hofmann's customers, was killed by a pipe bomb left at his office in downtown Salt Lake City in October 1985. A day later, Hofmann was badly injured by a pipe bomb placed in his automobile. Hofmann later pled guilty to the bombings. In the investigation of the murders, police investigators uncovered Hofmann's forgeries, which ran to hundreds of documents—all or nearly all documents and historical artifacts "discovered" by Hofmann in his career—including the Oath of a Freeman.

Hofmann demonstrated considerable skill in the creation of his forgeries. He acquired or stole paper that was manufactured appropriate to the time of the documents he forged. He made his own ink and used chemical processes to age his documents in order to make them look authentic. He would acquire old books from the era in question, find the blank pages that were always inserted at the front and the back of the book, cut those out and use the paper for some of his forgeries. He learned to hypnotize himself in order to fluidly copy the signatures of historical figures. His forgeries fooled experts in the field, such as Charles Hamilton, Kenneth W. Rendell, and investigators at the National Archives and the Federal Bureau of Investigation. During his confession, Hofmann stated that he did most of his printing from plates that he made himself but “got lazy and had the ‘Oath’ plate made professionally".
