= Dr. Robert Smith House =

Historic house in Ohio, United States

- U.S. National Register of Historic Places
- U.S. National Historic Landmark
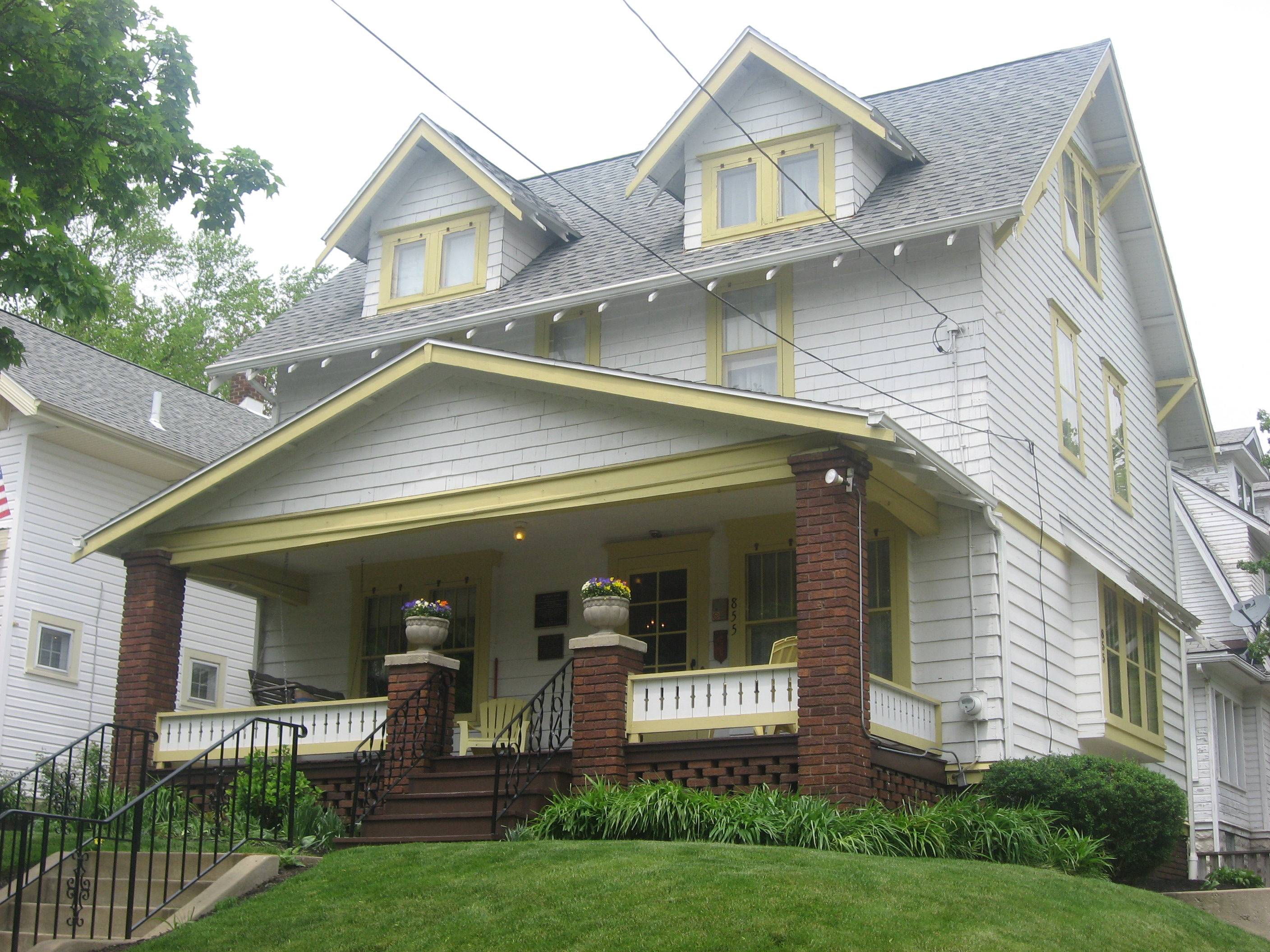

- Location within Ohio Location within the United States
- Interactive map showing the location of Dr. Bob’s House
- Location: 855 Ardmore Ave., Akron, Ohio
- Coordinates: 41°5′45″N 81°32′56″W
- Area: less than one acre
- Built: 1914
- NRHP reference No.: 85003411

Significant dates
- Added to NRHP: October 31, 1985
- Designated NHL: October 6, 2012

The Dr. Robert Smith House, also known as Dr. Bob's Home, is a historic house museum at 855 Ardmore Avenue in Akron, Ohio. Built in 1914, it is significant as the home from 1915 to 1950 of Dr. Bob Smith ("Dr. Bob"), one of the cofounders of Alcoholics Anonymous (AA). It was here that Smith and Bill W. began the meetings that became AA, through which Smith achieved sobriety. The house was listed on the National Register of Historic Places in 1985, and was designated a National Historic Landmark in 2012.

== Description and history ==
The Dr. Robert Smith House is located in a residential area northwest of downtown Akron, at the northwest corner of Ardmore and Everett Avenues. It is a 2 1/2-story wood-frame structure, with Craftsman/Bungalow styling. It has a side gable roof with extended eaves showing exposed rafters, and its front face is pierced by a pair of gabled dormers. A single-story porch extends across the front, supported by brick piers and topped by a broad gabled roof. The interior has been restored to a 1930s–1940s appearance, retaining a number of features important in the history of Dr. Bob Smith's alcoholism and recovery, such as hiding places where he stashed liquor. One of the upstairs bedrooms is known as the "Surrender Room", and is where even today recovering alcoholics surrender themselves to a Higher Power according to AA's tenets.

The house was built in 1914, and purchased in 1915 by Robert and Anna Smith. Smith was a medical doctor who struggled since his college days with alcoholism. In 1935, Bill W. spent several months living with the Smiths, and it was probably around the house's kitchen table that the principles underlying Alcoholics Anonymous were developed. The house was sold after Bob Smith died in 1950, and passed through several owners before its purchase in 1984 by the Founders Foundation, a nonprofit dedicated to preserving the AA history and legacy.

Today, Dr. Bob’s Home (EIN: 34-1461210) is a 501(c)(3) nonprofit organization that maintains the home and educates the community about its role in AA’s formation.”

== See also ==
- List of National Historic Landmarks in Ohio
- National Register of Historic Places listings in Akron, Ohio
- Stepping Stones, Katonah, New York
- Bill Wilson House, East Dorset, Vermont
