= Dorset, Vermont =

- Town
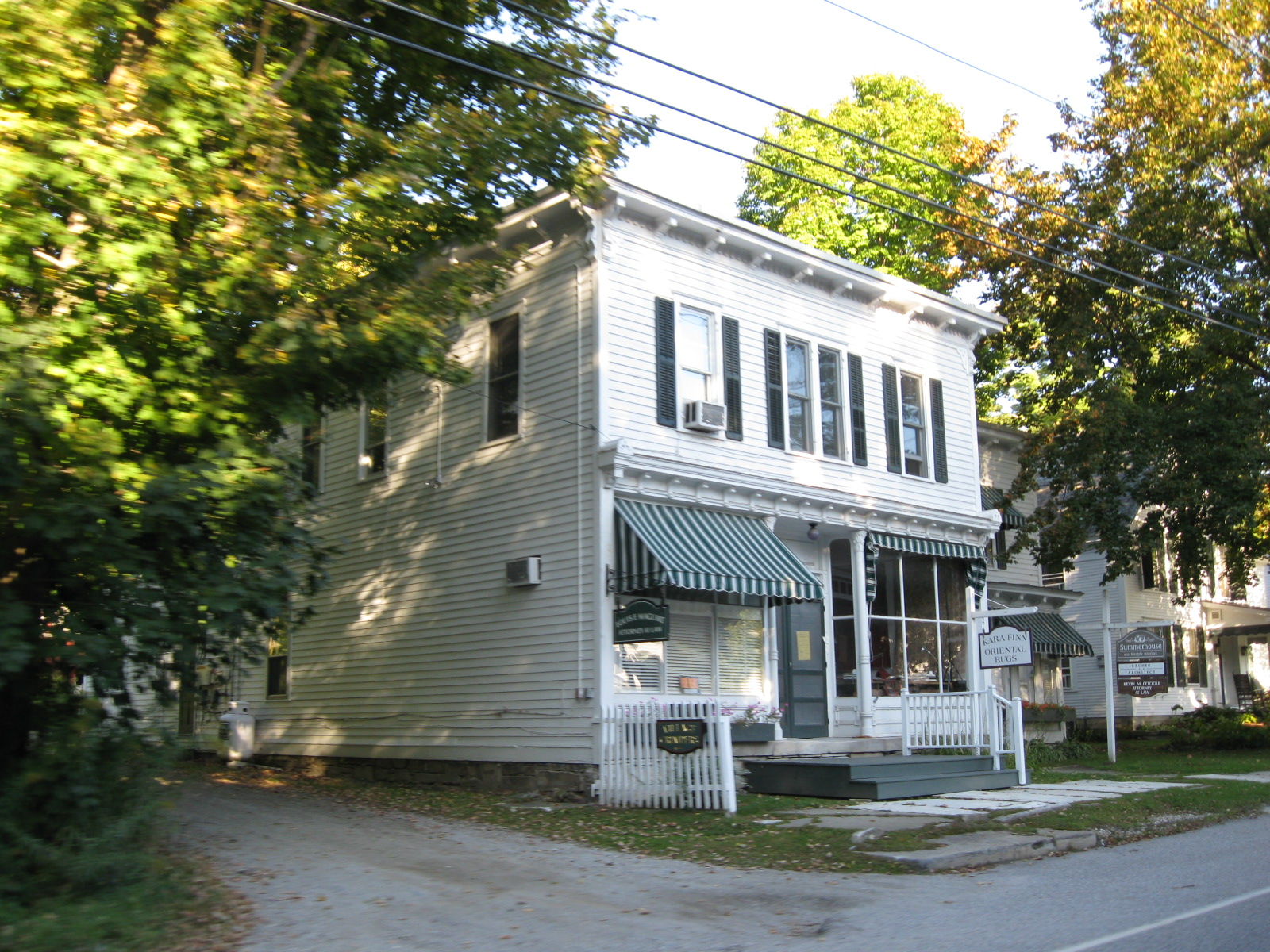
- A shop in Dorset Village

- Seal

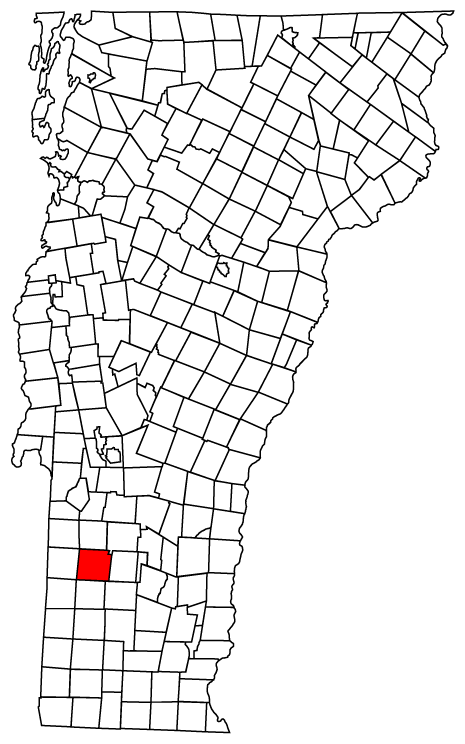
- Dorset, Vermont
- Coordinates: 43°15′32″N 73°03′42″W
- Country: United States
- State: Vermont
- County: Bennington
- Communities: Dorset; East Dorset; Freedleyville; North Dorset; South Dorset

Area
  - Total: 47.9 sq mi (124.0 km^{2})
  - Land: 47.8 sq mi (123.7 km^{2})
  - Water: 0.12 sq mi (0.3 km^{2})
- Elevation: 1,375 ft (419 m)

Population (2020)
  - Total: 2,133
  - Density: 45/sq mi (17.2/km^{2})
- Time zone: UTC-5 (Eastern (EST))
  - Summer (DST): UTC-4 (EDT)
- ZIP codes: 05251 (Dorset); 05253 (East Dorset)
- Area code: 802
- FIPS code: 50-17725
- GNIS feature ID: 1462082
- Website: dorsetvt.org

Dorset is a town in Bennington County, Vermont, United States. The population was 2,133 at the 2020 census. Dorset is famous for being the location of Cephas Kent's Inn, where four meetings of the Convention that signed the Dorset Accords led to the independent Vermont Republic and future statehood. Dorset is the site of America's oldest marble quarry and is the birthplace of Bill W., co-founder of Alcoholics Anonymous. East Dorset is the site of the Wilson House and the Griffith Library. The town is named after the English county of Dorset.

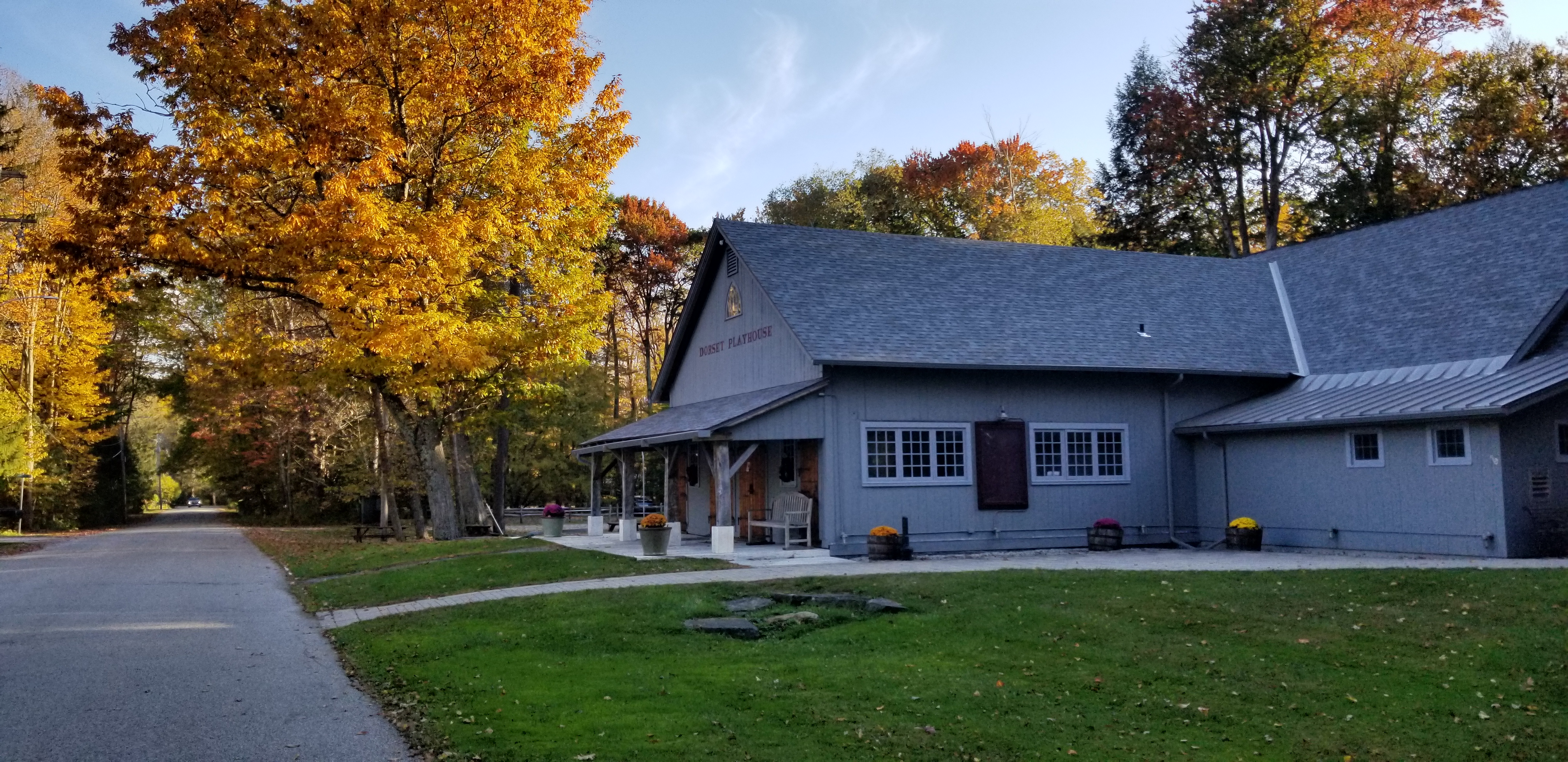
Dorset Playhouse, located near the Dorset Green in October 2021.

The East Dorset marble quarry had been established by Bill W.'s great grandfather and stayed in the family for three generations. Marble from these quarries provided stone for the New York Public Library Main Branch building in New York City. The quarry closed and during the summer months serves as a popular swimming hole.

The Dorset town center is defined as the Dorset census-designated place and had a population of 249 at the 2010 census.

== History ==
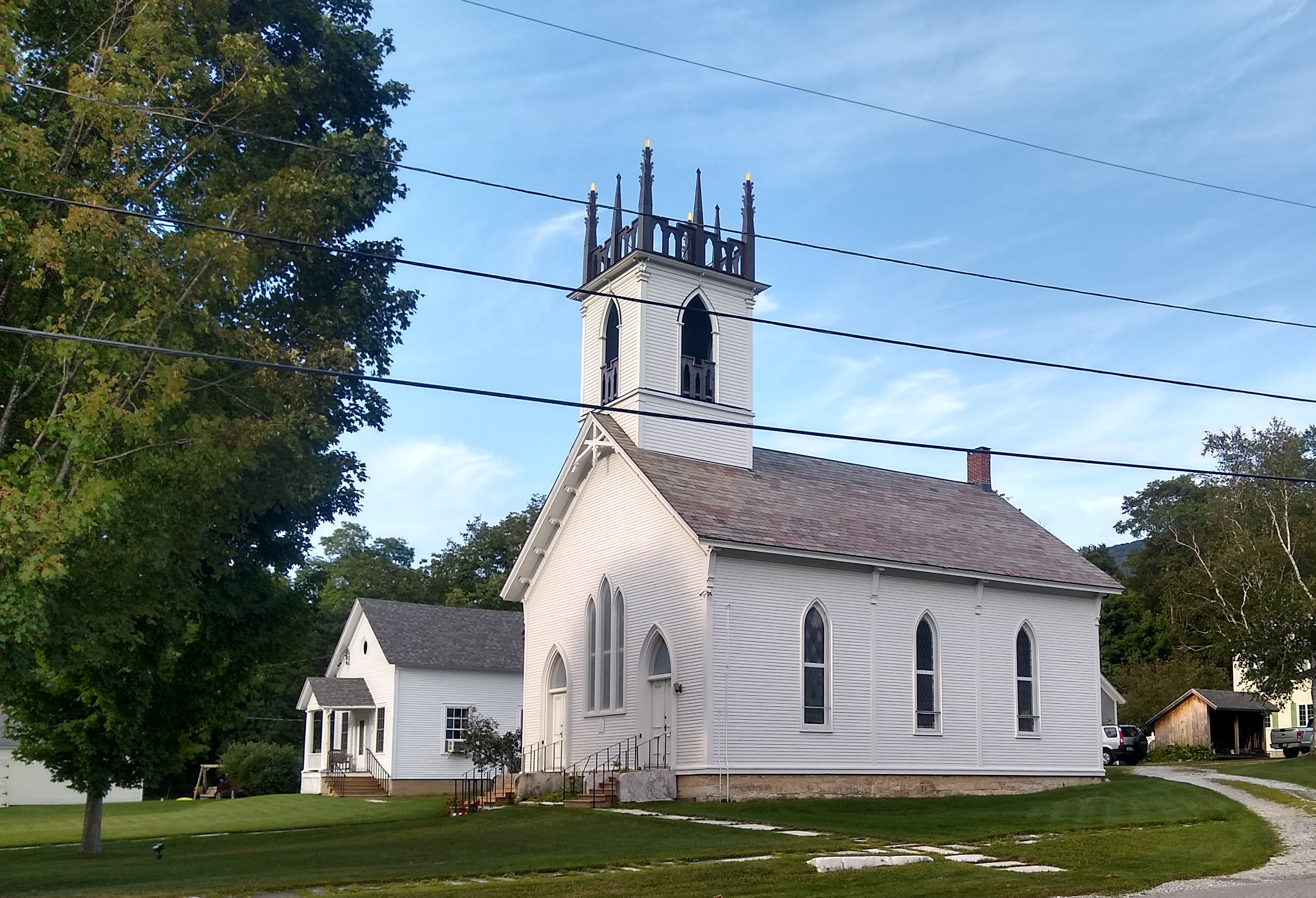
East Dorset Congregational Church

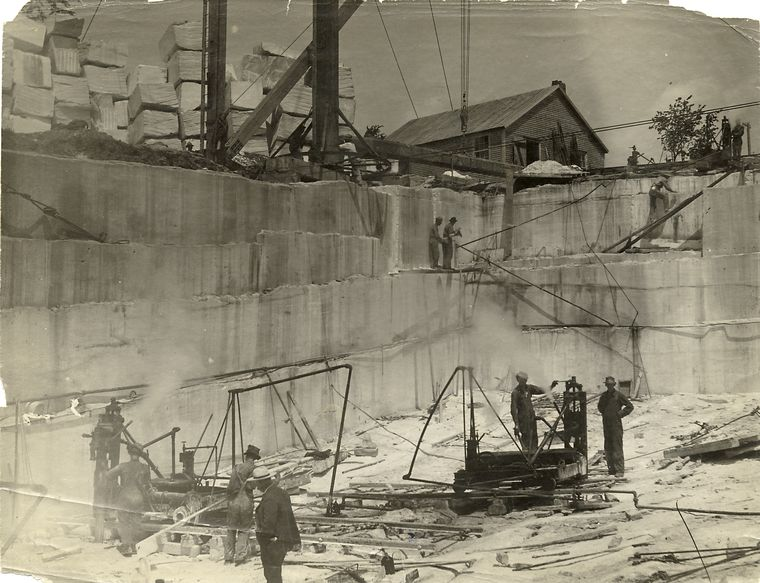
Marble quarry in Dorset, Vermont, where some of the stones for the New York Public Library were quarried.

Through a series of treaties, native tribes had surrendered title to large areas of land. Subsequently, the Provincial Governor of New Hampshire had provided land grants west of the Connecticut River in land that was also claimed by the Province of New York. Strife was created by New York attempting to enforce its legitimate claim to government on settlers who had in good faith purchased land titles from New Hampshire. The King upon the advice of the Privy Council decreed a settlement that was not followed by the Governor and Legislature of New York.

Sandwiched between New York and New Hampshire, the area was constantly in dispute and claimed by both. New York claimed it was included in its 1664 grant from Charles II, but had made no effort to settle it. New Hampshire, desiring to expand its frontier to the west, simply expropriated the land and proceeded to grant 131 charters in the territory, which then became known as the New Hampshire Grants. New York retaliated by declaring the Grants null and void and telling the settlers they would have to repurchase the land from New York (at a much higher price) if they wished to stay. The New Hampshire Grantees countered by organizing the "Green Mountain Boys", an informal alliance of civilian soldiers who successfully prevented the settlers from being evicted.

To protect their investments in the land and improvements, and the health and security of their families, farms and towns, the people of the New Hampshire Grants formed Committees of Safety to coordinate protection of their society. These committees predated those of the 13 colonies formed to protect themselves from the crown by eight years, yet had precedents in similar organizations during the French and Indian War.

Born in Connecticut, Cephas Kent moved himself and his family to Dorset in 1773. He was a deacon in a local church. He owned and operated a small tavern, destined to play a part in Vermont's history. By 1775, the land control controversy had reached the point that the Grantees decided to take official action, and they held a general convention in Cephas Kent's tavern. Matters discussed at that meeting were not limited to their internal affairs but also included the general cause of American independence. The Continental Congress had voted to pay the Green Mountain Boys for their services and had asked that a regiment be formed in the New Hampshire Grants. The Grantees wanted to join in the general rebellion but not as a part of New Hampshire and certainly not as a part of New York. So they petitioned the Continental Congress to intervene in their behalf against New York and permit the Grantees to serve independently in the war of rebellion.

The Grantees met three more times during the course of the next year, always in Cephas Kent's tavern, and on June 25, 1776, voted "that application be made to the inhabitants of said Grants to form the same into a separate district." Later that day the convention bound itself "to defend by arms the United American States against the hostile attempts of the British fleet and armies until the present unhappy controversy between the two countries shall be settled." This was the first official step toward Vermont's independence.

Thus, the future state of Vermont was underway. The town of Windsor claims to be the birthplace of Vermont, and, indeed, it was there, on July 2, 1777, that the constitution was adopted and the name chosen. But it was in Dorset at Cephas Kent's tavern that the idea of Vermont was born; and, as Zephine Humphrey put it, "The idea is the dynamic reality and the fact its shadow." In 1790, New York finally relinquished her claims and, on February 18, 1791, Congress admitted Vermont as the fourteenth state. In 1912 the Vermont Society of Colonial Dames erected an historical marker at the site of the Cephas Kent Inn in Dorset.

The agreements made at Cephas Kent's tavern are commonly known as the Dorset Accords.

== Geography ==
Dorset is located along the northern border of Bennington County, with Rutland County on the north. The Taconic Mountains occupy the central and western 3/4 of the town, with the Valley of Vermont on the east side of town separating the Taconics from the Green Mountains to the east. The communities of East Dorset, Freedleyville, and North Dorset are all in the Valley of Vermont, along U.S. Route 7, as is Emerald Lake State Park. Dorset and South Dorset are located in the western and southern parts of the town, respectively, along Vermont Route 30 in a valley between two portions of the Taconic Range. 3,230-foot (980 m) Mount Aeolus is located in the southern part of the town between South Dorset and East Dorset. Dorset Mountain rises in the northern part of the town, with its 3,770-foot (1,150 m) summit (Dorset Peak) located just north of the town line in Danby. A 3,730-foot (1,140 m) subsidiary peak is located in Dorset proper.

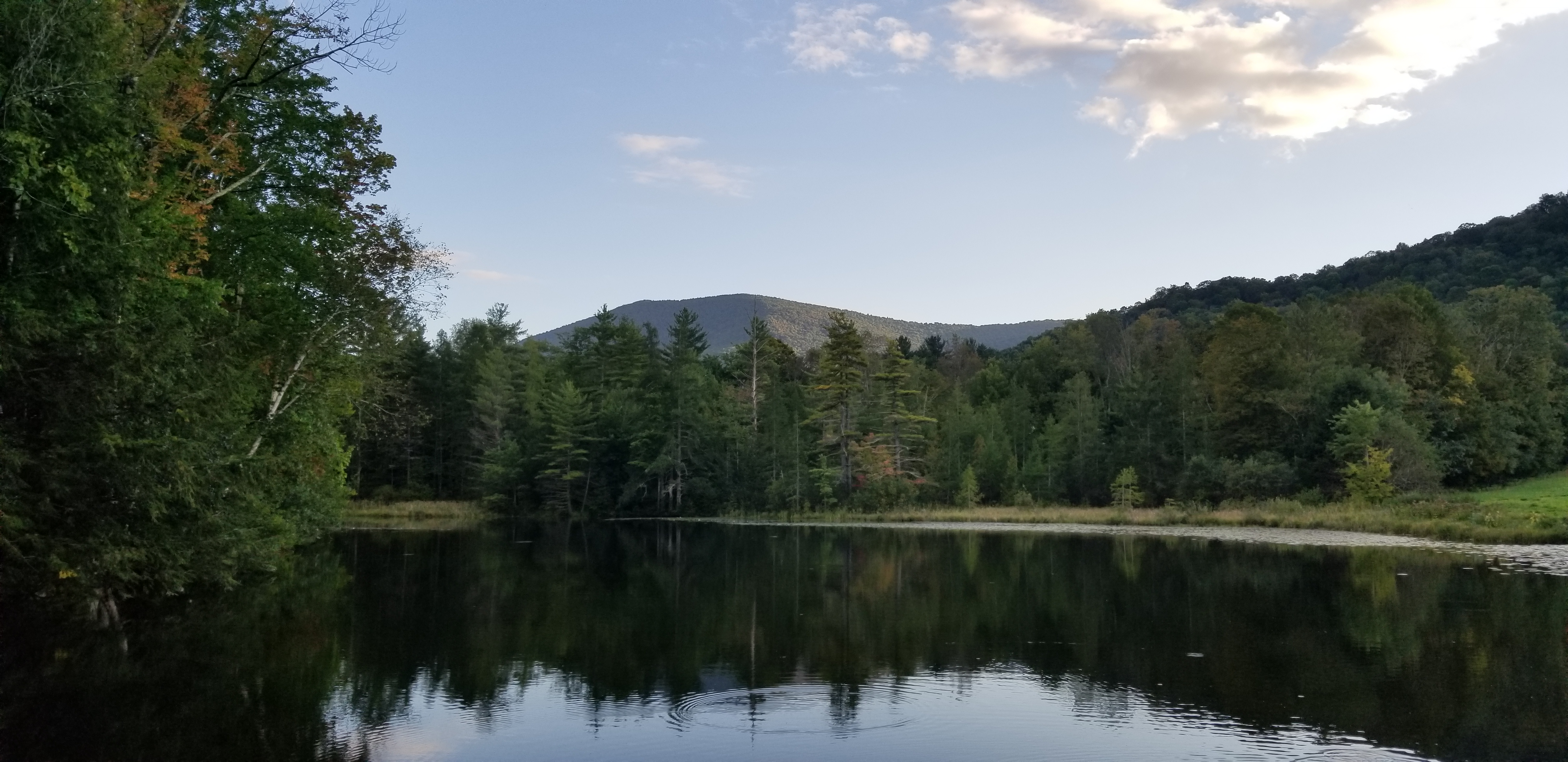
Prentiss Pond viewed from Church street in Dorset, Vermont.

According to the United States Census Bureau, the town has a total area of 47.9 square miles (124.0 km^{2}), of which 47.8 square miles (123.7 km^{2}) is land and 0.1 square miles (0.3 km^{2}), or 0.27%, is water. The height of land in the Valley of Vermont between the Hudson River and Lake Champlain watersheds is located in Dorset. The Batten Kill rises just north of East Dorset and flows south into Manchester, then west to the Hudson in New York. The Otter Creek, one of the longest rivers entirely in Vermont, rises a short distance north of the Batten Kill's source and flows north through Emerald Lake and into Rutland County, eventually reaching Lake Champlain north of Vergennes.

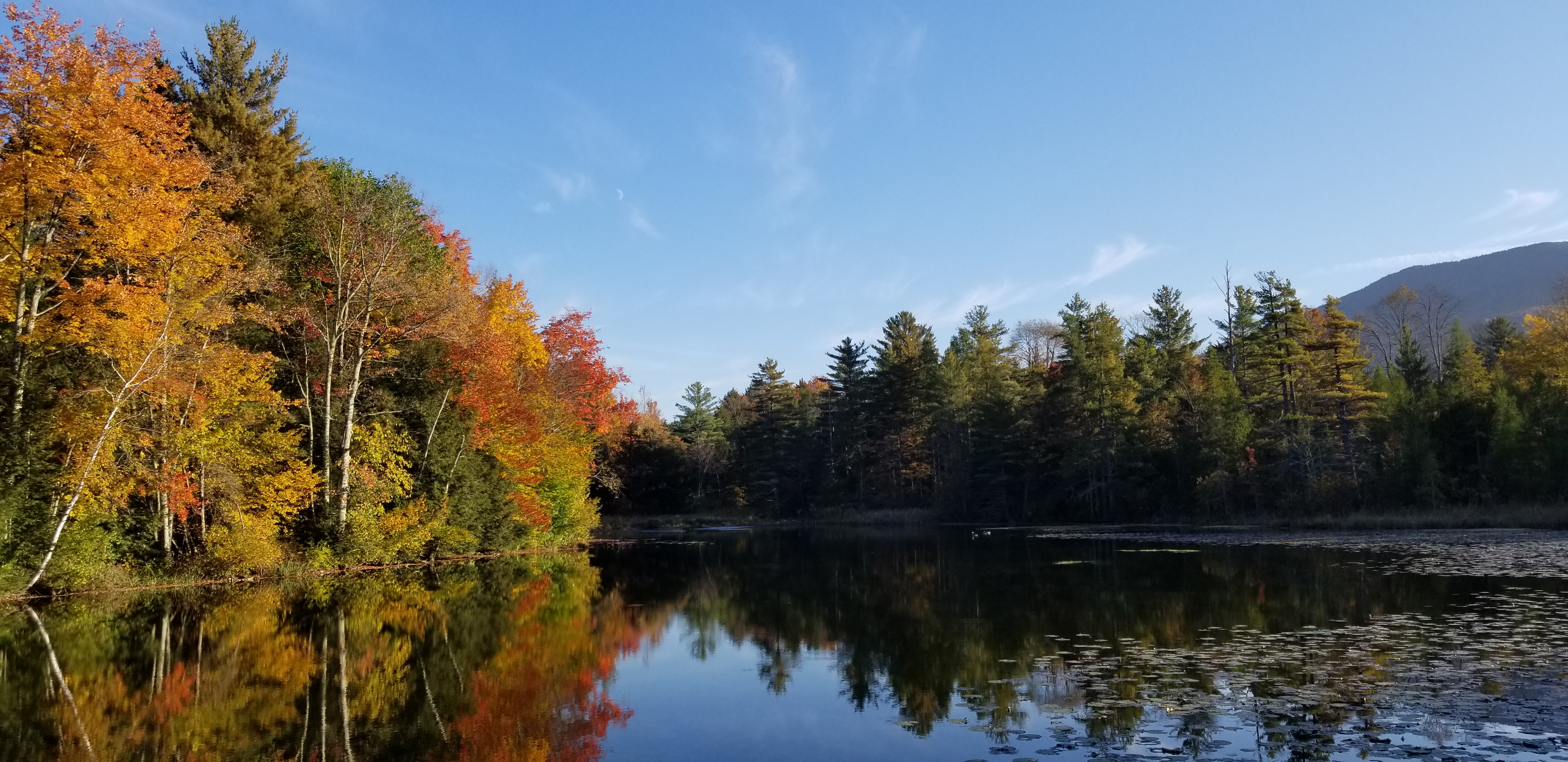
Fall foliage surrounding Prentiss Pond in Dorset Vermont in October 2021.

=== Climate ===
This climatic region is typified by large seasonal temperature differences, with warm to hot (and often humid) summers and cold (sometimes severely cold) winters. According to the Köppen Climate Classification system, Dorset has a humid continental climate, abbreviated "Dfb" on climate maps.

== Demographics ==
Historical population
Census	Pop.	Note	%±
1790	958		—
1800	1,286		34.2%
1810	1,294		0.6%
1820	1,359		5.0%
1830	1,507		10.9%
1840	1,432		−5.0%
1850	1,700		18.7%
1860	2,090		22.9%
1870	2,195		5.0%
1880	2,005		−8.7%
1890	1,696		−15.4%
1900	1,477		−12.9%
1910	1,472		−0.3%
1920	1,226		−16.7%
1930	1,120		−8.6%
1940	1,128		0.7%
1950	1,150		2.0%
1960	1,150		0.0%
1970	1,293		12.4%
1980	1,648		27.5%
1990	1,918		16.4%
2000	2,036		6.2%
2010	2,031		−0.2%
2020	2,133		5.0%
U.S. Decennial Census

At the 2000 census, there were 2,036 people 856 households, and 600 families residing in the town. The population density was 42.6 per square mile (16.4/km^{2}). There were 1,246 housing units at an average density of 26.1 per square mile (10.1/km^{2}). The racial makeup of the town was 98.97% White, 0.44% African American, 0.05% Native American, 0.15% Asian, 0.10% from other races, and 0.29% from two or more races. Hispanic or Latino of any race were 0.39% of the population.

There were 856 households, of which 27.1% had children under the age of 18 living with them, 59.8% were married couples living together, 7.8% had a female householder with no husband present, and 29.8% were non-families. 24.8% of all households were made up of individuals, and 11.4% had someone living alone who was 65 years of age or older. The average household size was 2.38 and the average family size was 2.82.

21.9% of the population were under the age of 18, 5.0% from 18 to 24, 23.0% from 25 to 44, 30.6% from 45 to 64, and 19.5% who were 65 years of age or older. The median age was 45 years. For every 100 females, there were 98.8 males. For every 100 females age 18 and over, there were 94.1 males.

The median household income was $54,219 and the median family income was $62,969. Males had a median income of $40,027 and females $28,167. The per capita income was $32,956. About 3.0% of families and 5.4% of the population were below the poverty line, including 6.3% of those under age 18 and 2.5% of those age 65 or over.

== Transportation ==
Dorset is crossed by US Route 7, VT Route 7A, and VT Route 30. Public transportation is provided along US 7 and VT 7A by Marble Valley Regional Transit District's "The Bus" from Monday to Saturday out of Rutland.

== Notable people ==
- William B. Bartlett, Wisconsin state legislator
- Dom DeLuise, actor and comedian
- Lorenzo Hatch, engraver and artist
- W.C. Heinz, war correspondent and sports journalist
- James Howe, children's writer known for the Bunnicula series
- John Irving, novelist
- John Nassivera, award winning playwright, author, professor
- Elizabeth Payson Prentiss author
- Theresa Rebeck, award-winning Broadway/TV playwright
- Ellen Stimson, author known for her work on life in Dorset
- Mark Whalon, poet and author, and friend and mentor to Bill Wilson
- Bill Wilson (1895–1971), aka Bill W., co-founder of Alcoholics Anonymous
- Treat Williams, film actor
