= Bill Wilson House =

Historic building in Vermont, US

- Wilson House
- U.S. National Register of Historic Places
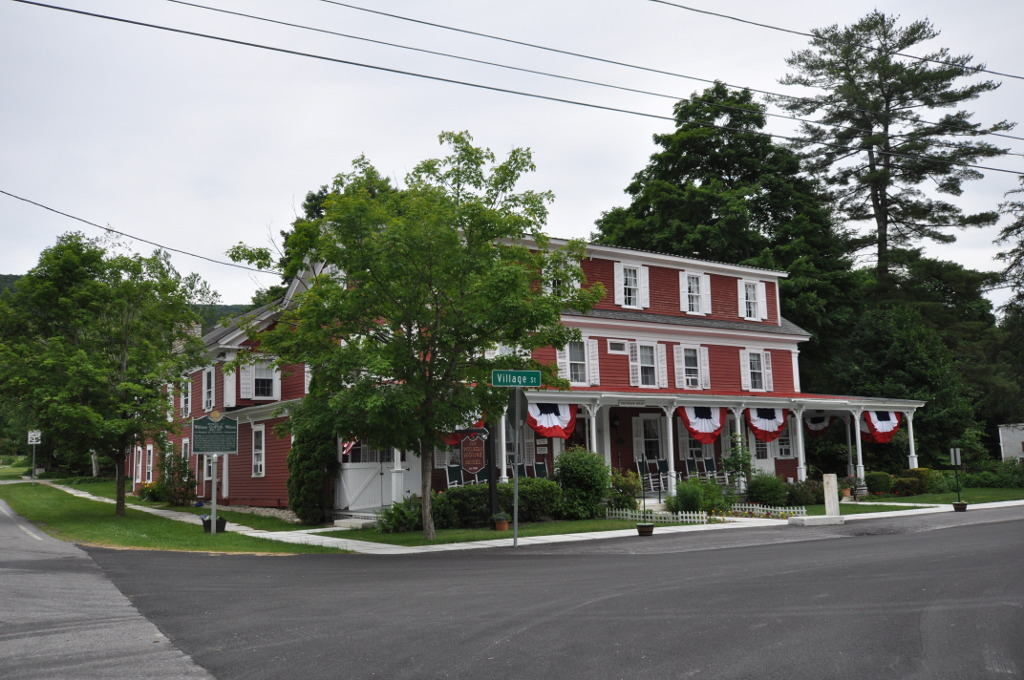
- Interactive map showing the location of Bill Wilson’s House
- Location: 378 Village St., East Dorset, Vermont
- Coordinates: 43°14′22″N 73°0′33″W
- Area: less than one acre
- Built: 1852
- Architectural style: Greek Revival
- NRHP reference No.: 95001427
- Added to NRHP: December 13, 1995

The Bill Wilson House is a historic 19th-century hotel at 378 Village Street in East Dorset, Vermont, United States. Built in 1852, it is the birthplace and living memorial of Alcoholics Anonymous co-founder Bill Wilson. With 14 guestrooms and a conference room the non-profit bed and breakfast is a center for recovery seminars and regular AA and ALANON meetings. The property was listed on the National Register of Historic Places in 1995.

== Description ==
The Bill Wilson House stands at the southeast corner of Village Street and Mad Tom Road in the center of East Dorset, and is one of the village's largest buildings. It is a rambling two-story wood-frame building, its front facing west toward Village Street, and three sections extending along Mad Tom Road to the east. The front has a single-story porch with modest Greek Revival styling, which extends partially around the north and south sides. It is joined by a 2 1/2-story ell to a large carriage barn, which now serves as a meeting space and lounge.

== History ==
The building was constructed and opened as a hotel in 1852 in the small Vermont marble quarry village. The owners were the Griffith family when William (Bill) Griffith Wilson was born on November 26, 1895, on the ground floor behind the bar of the hotel during a snow storm. After two years he moved to Rutland until the divorce of his parents. Then, at the age of 11, Bill and his sister, Dorothy, returned to East Dorset to live with their maternal grandparents, the Griffiths. In 1987 the building had been vacant for several years and Ozzie Lepper bought it in order to turn it into a living memorial to Bill W. Since then the building underwent constant renovations and is now a functioning guest house and conference center. Bill W. is buried close by in a cemetery next to his wife Lois and the Griffith family.

Room 9 of the hotel is believed to be the room where Bill and Lois stayed during one of their visits.

== Griffith Library ==
Nearby stands the Griffith Library where Bill lived with his sister and his grandparents. Today it is a museum and a library dedicated to Bill Wilson who is the author of the book Alcoholics Anonymous, the 12 steps and many other books about recovery from alcoholism. It is at this house where he had many important childhood experiences such as building a boomerang from scratch and building a radio. At the nearby Emerald Lake he met his future wife Lois Wilson.

Prior to the development of the Wilson birthplace, Bill and Lois Wilson frequently came back to East Dorset staying at the Aerie inn which is in the same locale as the Wilson homestead. The Wilsons spent summers at the Aerie Inn from 1960 up until his year of death in the early 1970s. The Wilsons did not have any children which led them to become close to the owners and builders of the Aerie Inn. The room of their choice to live in was room 6 which to this day has been preserved. The property fell into disrepair up until 2003 when it was purchased with the intent of keeping the integrity of the Wilsons memory intact.

== See also ==
- National Register of Historic Places listings in Bennington County, Vermont
- Dr. Robert Smith House, Akron, Ohio
- Stepping Stones, Katonah, New York
