= Stephen Daye =

First printer in Colonial America

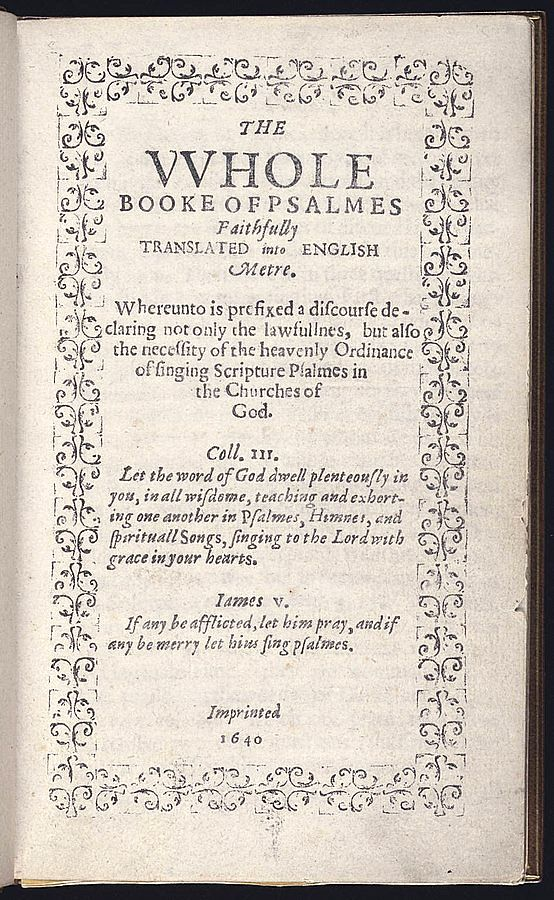
The Whole Booke of Psalmes Faithfully Translated into English Metre, printed by Stephen Daye, Cambridge, Massachusetts, published in 1640, was the first book printed in British North America

Stephen Daye (c. 1594 – December 22, 1668) emigrated from England to Massachusetts Bay Colony in British America. Likely with the help of his son Matthew, he became the first printer in colonial America, under indenture to Elizabeth Glover, owner of the first printing press in the British Colonies. At this press was printed the Bay Psalm Book in 1640, the first book printed in the present day United States.

== Early life ==
Daye was born in Sutton, Surrey London, and emigrated on June 7, 1638, to Cambridge, Massachusetts, on board the John of London with Joseph and Elizabeth Glover and their children and three household servants, and his wife Rebecca (Wright) Bordman (Bordman – from a previous marriage) (died October 17, 1658), sons Stephen Jr. (died December 1, 1639), Matthew (died May 10, 1649), and stepson William Bordman (died March 25, 1685).

== Career ==
In 1638, he is recorded as being a locksmith by profession who was under financial contract to Reverend Joseph Glover to repay the loan of £51 for ship transportation for himself and his household and the cost of purchasing iron cooking utensils. Glover died on the ship John of London during the voyage, but Daye was legally bound to fulfill his contract, which is believed to require him to set up and work the printing press with the aid of his sons and stepson in Cambridge. Elizabeth Glover became the legal owner of the press and of Daye's debt and contract upon the death of her husband. She was publisher at the press until her death in 1643, after which Daye was dismissed and his son Matthew installed in his place.

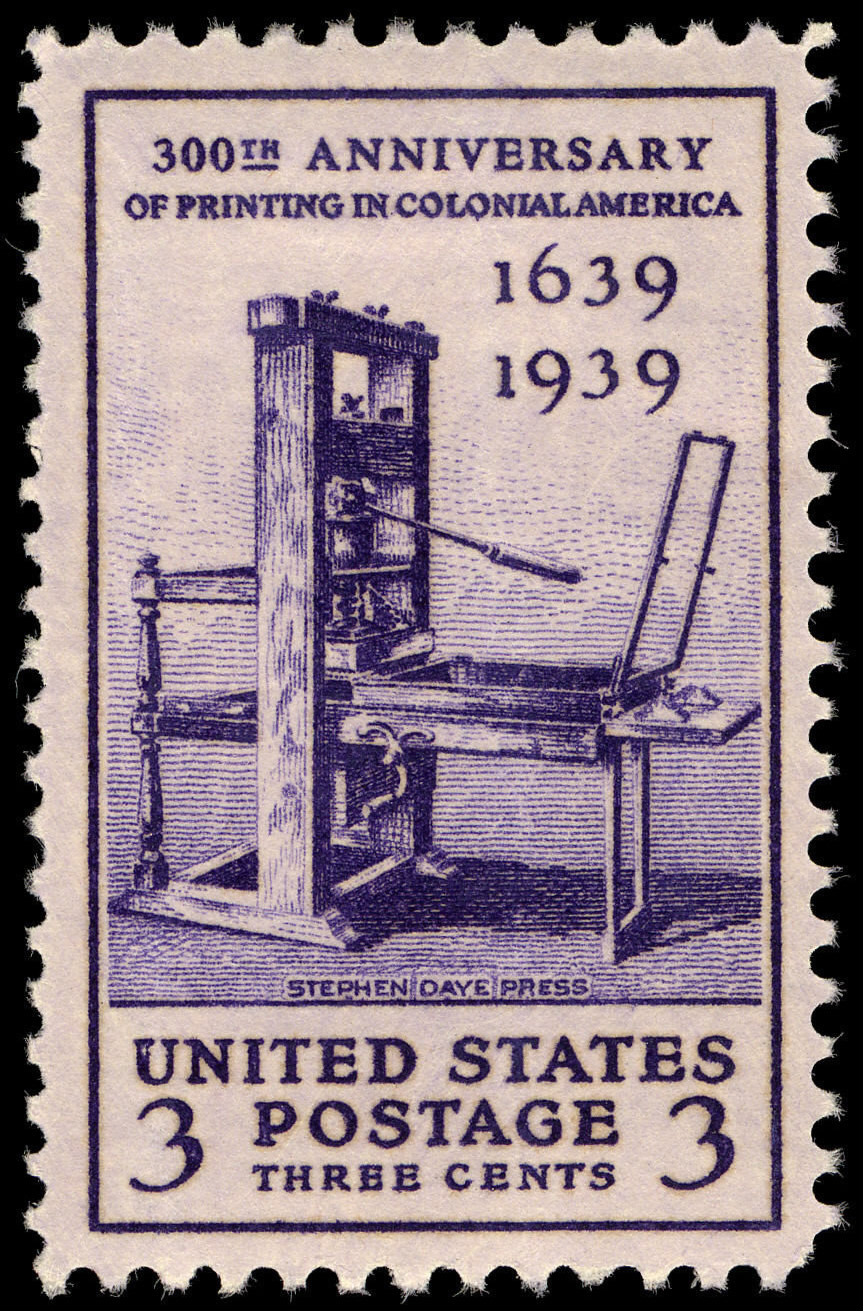
A 1939 U.S. stamp depicting Stephen Daye's printing press, commemorating the 300th anniversary of printing in colonial America

A 1639 broadsheet of the Oath of a Freeman was one of the first two items printed at the press, by either Daye or Matthew, though no copies survive. This small broadside was an oath of loyalty and duty required of all new colonists in Massachusetts Bay. Accepting the full responsibilities of citizenship in the settlement was symbolized by taking the Oath. The other early item was the first almanac in the colonies, by William Pierce. Pierce's almanac, as was typical, commenced with the month of March, which according to English law and custom was the first month of the year, rather than the Gregorian calendar that began in January.

In 1640, the press produced the Bay Psalm Book, the first book published in the American colonies. The Bay Psalm Book was a new English translation of the 150 Hebrew psalms and then arranged in verse for singing. Because the Psalms were translated for communal singing, the book served as one of the symbols of religious freedom for people in the colonies.

The first edition was printed in an estimated 1,700 copies. The book was replete with errors and discrepancies, showing the limitations of the Dayes' printing skills. Only eleven surviving copies are known today. The next year, 1641, Daye was rewarded for his work with three hundred acres of land.

== Legacy ==
More than a century after Daye's death, his legacy found renewed fame in Vermont, when his printing press came into the possession of printers Judah Spooner and Timothy Green, who used it to publish the state's first newspaper in Westminster, Vermont, The Vermont Gazette, or Green Mountain Post-Boy, on February 12, 1781. In tribute to this history, in 1932 a regional literary publisher in Brattleboro, Vermont was christened the Stephen Daye Press, and went on to publish local poets and writers notable to Vermont history, including Elliott Merrick, Mark Whalon, and Walter Hard.

Following the United States' entry into World War II, Stephen Daye Press closed in December 1942.

== Bibliography ==
- Malone (1932). Dictionary of American biography. Vol. V. New York: Charles Scribner's Sons.
- Sidney A. Kimber, The Story of an Old Press: An Account of the Hand-Press Known As the Stephen Daye Press, Upon Which Was begun in 1638 the first Printing in British North America. (Cambridge, Massachusetts : University Press, 1937)
- Robert F. Roden, Famous Presses. The Cambridge Press 1638–1692. A History of the First Printing Press Established in English America, together with a bibliographical list of the issues of the press. (New York : Dodd & Mead, 1905)
- "Daye, Stephen". The Columbia Electronic Encyclopedia, 6th ed. Copyright 2012, Columbia University Press. Online reprint (FactMonster.com). Retrieved 26 May 2006.
