= Ellen Stimson =

American author

Ellen Stimson is an American author. In 2013 she wrote the work Mud Season, detailing her family's life in small town Vermont, after moving from the St. Louis area. The stories that appear in her books are largely based around their holiday traditions and life running a small country store in Dorset, Vermont. Parts of her books have also appeared in Reader's Digest. Her follow-up Good Grief! was published in 2014, which was then followed by her book An Old Fashioned Christmas.

== Personal life ==
Ellen Stimson was raised in St. Louis and continued living there until 2003, when she moved to the town of Dorset, Vermont. She took over a country store in Dorset and operated it until 2007, naming it "Peltier's" after the original owners. The store itself was first founded in 1816. While living in St. Louis, Stimson had previously been the head of the retail division for book wholesaler The Book Source, before becoming a part owner in Unique Books. Stimson is a breast cancer survivor, diagnosed at the age of 33 in 1996. She is married to John Rushing, with whom she has three kids.

== Mud Season ==
In 2013 Stimson published the book Mud Season: How One Woman's Dream of Moving to Vermont, Raising Children, Chickens and Sheep, and Running the Old Country Store Pretty Much Led to One Calamity After Another. Rachel Carter reviewed the book, writing it "is a fish-out-of-water tale describing what it's actually like to move to a rural town in the middle of nowhere." Stimson made the decision to write the work as her 50th birthday approached in 2012, feeling that the best way of spending the weeks leading up to the date was to write a book. The narrative non-fiction work surrounds her country store, the sale of which occurs at the end of the book. One of the book's chapters "Bats and Bears and Skunks — Oh My" was reprinted in the October 2013 edition of Reader's Digest.

== Good Grief! ==
In 2014 Stimson published the book Good Grief! Life in a Tiny Vermont Village. The book follows her narrative non-fiction about her family. Kirkus Reviews wrote, "Stimson, her husband and their three children are still living in rural Vermont, dealing with all of the changes that come as children become teenagers and marriages find their patterns." The book was supported by a thirty-city national book tour.

== An Old-Fashioned Christmas ==
In 2015 Stimson published her book An Old-Fashioned Christmas: Sweet Traditions for Hearth and Home. The book contains the Christmas-related tales about her family, from their choice to live in Vermont to their holiday celebrations. The book also contains recipes that the family makes for the holiday season.
