= Elizabeth Glover =

English Proprietor of first printing press in the British colonies (1602–1643)

- Born: 1602; England
- Died: June 23, 1643 (aged 41); Cambridge, Massachusetts, United States
- Other name: Elizabeth Harris
- Occupation: Proprietor of Cambridge Press
- Years active: 1639–1641
- Known for: Establishing the first printing business in the Thirteen Colonies
- Notable work: Oath of a Freeman, Al Almenack, Bay Psalm Book
- Spouse: Henry Dunster

Elizabeth Glover (née Harris; 1602 – June 23, 1643) was an English woman and first American publisher. She established the first printing press in the Thirteen Colonies, located next to the nascent Harvard College in Cambridge, Massachusetts, where she printed Oath of a Freeman, An Almenack, and the Bay Psalm Book with the help of printer Stephen Daye. She married Henry Dunster, first president of Harvard University. After Glover's death, the printing press was gifted to Harvard.

== Family and Early life ==
Harris was born in 1601 to Nathaniel and Mary Harris. She was born into a family of notable ecclesiastical and academic prestige, and presumably this context shaped her role as the wife of Harvard's first president.

Her paternal grandfather, Richard Harris, was a fellow of New College, Oxford and Rector of Hardwicke. . Elizabeth's father, Nathaniel Harris, received the degree of B.L.L. from New College in 1593, and for most of Elizabeth's childhood was Rector of Bletchingley in Surrey. Nathaniel Harris was considered "prominent in university and ecclesiastical circles".

== Marriage to Joseph Glover ==
Elizabeth Harris married Reverend Joseph Glover (also written Joos, Joss, Jose, Josse, Jesse, and Joas) in 1630 while he served as Rector of St Nicholas, Sutton in the Hundred of Wallington (formerly Croydon) in Surrey, England, a post he had held since May 1624. Their marriage took place about two years after the death of Joseph's first wife, Sarah Owfield.

During the first six years of their marriage, Joseph continued to serve in his rectory in Surrey. Elizabeth cared for her three step-children and also had two children with Joseph. Though respected as Rector, Joseph eventually grew out of the role. One historian explains: "Mr. Glover became interested in the non-conformists and preached acceptably to them in London." The "non-conformist" thinking eventually pushed the Glovers to leave Surrey in 1636. One historian writes of Glover:

His heart was wrapt in its progress and advancement; and during the interim of his retirement from the Rectory of Sutton, he had been untiring in his efforts to promote its growth under the influence of an educational system. He contributed unsparingly himself of his wealth and influence, and induced others of his friends both in England and Holland, to become interested in so noble a cause.

== Buying the press ==
Joseph had contacts in Cambridge, Massachusetts, who helped him prepare to establish a printing business there. As Isaiah Thomas remarks in A History of Printing:

Among the first settlers of New England were not only pious but educated men. They emigrated from a country where the press had more license than in other parts of Europe, and they were acquainted with the usefulness of it. As soon as they had made those provisions that were necessary for their existence in this land, which was then a rude wilderness, their next objects were, the establishment of schools, and a printing press.

The Glovers saw an opportunity in New England, and they both had the means to move to Cambridge. Joseph purchased lands and built a house in Boston in preparation for the permanent move.

In order to gain funds for the printing business, the Glovers began looking for donors. With financial support from friends and at his own expense, Joseph purchased a press, font, and other supplies needed to establish a printing business. Several friends supported Joseph in his new endeavor, giving him money. Those friends were Thomas Clarke, James Oliver, Captain Allen, Captain Lake, Mr. Stoddard, Mr. Freake, and Mr. Hues.

Although the press would be the first in the English Colonies, it was not the first one on the continent of North America — the Glovers' press would be the second. A century earlier in 1536, a printing press was brought to Veracruz, Mexico. Now, the Glovers would bring a press to the New England Colonies.

On June 7, 1638, Joseph contracted with a man named Samuel Daye. Daye worked as a locksmith in London before being hired by the Glovers, and historians believe he may have been hired to run their press in Cambridge, though there is no evidence that this is the work he was hired to do. Some historians theorize that a separately contracted printer may have been on the ship and perished before arriving. The contract with Samuel Day, an indenture, included payment for his and his family's journey to New England.

== Journey to the colonies ==
In June 1638, the Glovers, Daye and his family, and their assistants left London on a ship, the John of London. However, Joseph died of an illness during the voyage. The accounts of his death state that Joseph "fell sick and died". They do not say what the illness was, but the cause is most likely smallpox. He was buried at sea in the Atlantic Ocean. Elizabeth was now the sole owner of the printing press and Daye's indenture. The ship arrived a few weeks later on the coast of New England in the fall.

== Arrival in Cambridge ==
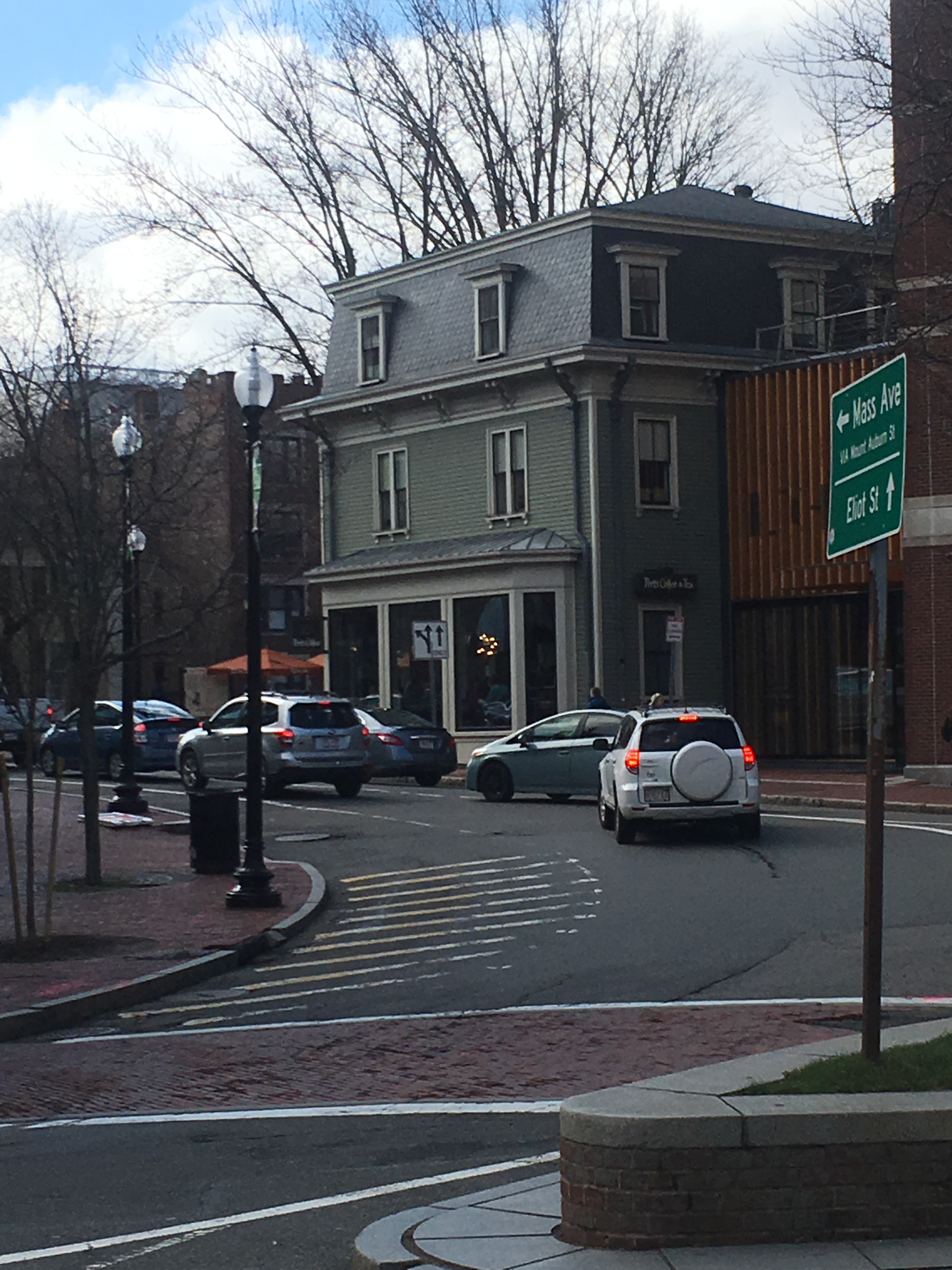
The original site of Elizabeth's house in Cambridge, MA, with a sign explaining what the house is next to it.

Elizabeth and her children arrived in Cambridge, Massachusetts, in the fall of 1638. Elizabeth decided to live near the college in Cambridge to be closer to her printing business, even though Joseph had purchased land and built a house for them in Boston.

Elizabeth bought a house built by Governor Haynes (former governor of Massachusetts who left to govern Connecticut) from Sir Henry Vane. The two-and-a-half-story house was the "most elegant abode in town". As one historian states: "It is cheering to know that the widow and children, so suddenly bereft, found so soon a pleasant and substantial dwelling in which to make a new home in the new country."

Elizabeth's household included five manservants and four maids. The Testimony of Sarah Bugknam and Joan Hassall reports:

Her furniture and plate were the talk of Cambridge for years. Former domestics remembered eleven feather beds, one with 'philop and Cheny curtaines in graine with a deep silke fring on the vallance, and a smaller on the Curtaines, and a Coverlett sutable to it, made of Red Kersie, and laced with green lace, round the sides, and 2 downe the middle'; a blue bed-rug and an 'outlandish quilt'; a chest full of fine linen and damask; tapestry and green dornick hangings on the walls; a great store of brass, pewter, and latten ware; and as 'faire and full cubbard of plate there was as might ordinarily be seene in most Gentlemens houses in England.

Out of all of Elizabeth's possessions, the only surviving artifact today is a piece of silver known as "The Great Salt". The silver dish belonged to the Glovers and has their initials engraved in it. It was passed on to Elizabeth's brother, Richard, upon her death. He, in turn, gave it to Harvard University; it is in the holdings of the Harvard Art Museums.

With her living accommodations taken care of, Elizabeth established the printing business. This process involved getting approval from the local magistrates and elders and finding a location to set it up. Since Elizabeth owned Daye's indenture, she decided to find housing for him and his family. She purchased a house on Holyoke Street and is believed to have set up the printing press in one of the lower rooms.

The exact date the printing business began is unclear, but it appears to be almost immediately after Elizabeth arrived in Cambridge. In October 1638, a man named Hugh Peter wrote a letter to a friend stating:

Wee have a printer here and thinke to goe to worke with some special things, and if you have anything you may send it safely by these.

The press's first documents were printed and distributed by the beginning of 1639.

== Contract with Daye ==
On June 7, 1638, Joseph had signed a contract of indenture with Daye. The contract specified that Joseph would pay Daye one-hundred pounds for two years of work, with an advance to pay for Daye and his family's passage to Cambridge. The contract states:

The condition of this obligation is such that whereas the above named Josse Glover hath undertaken and promised to bear the charges of and for the transportation of the above bounded Stephen Day and Rebecca his wife, and of Matthew and Stephen Day, their children, and of William Bordman, and three menservants, which are to be transported with him the said Stephen to New England in America, in the ship called the John of London;

The contract lists specific items and tasks that Joseph purchased and performed to help Daye transition into his new life, as well as consequences and responsibilities for carrying out the charges of the contract. It does not mention Daye's specific work with the printing press. He was hired to perform labor, but not as a printer. However, he was hired while Joseph arranged his printing business. He accompanied the Glovers on the same ship as the printing press. The press was set up in a room in the house Elizabeth purchased for him and his family. As historian Leona M. Hudak states: "From what few facts are available, we may conclude that Mrs. Glover, as the owner, might be termed proprietress or publisher of the press, while Stephen Daye was the overseer or manager." Some historians theorize that most of the labor fell to Daye's son, Matthew, who had some knowledge of printing and performed most of the labor with the press. While in London, Daye was employed as a locksmith. As Robert F. Roden describes his printing work in the Bay Psalm Book:

Daye is not supposed to have been a learned typographer, his workmen were untrained, his types were poor; the operations of the press, therefore were slow. The result of his labors was a rudely printed quarto of 148 leaves or 37 sheets […] In addition, a few words in Hebrew letters are employed in the preface and may have been specially cut on wood or metal for this book. Typographical errors and curiosities of spacing exist throughout the book. Oddly enough, the heading at the top of each left-hand page is printed "Psalm", while on the opposite page the word is spelled and spaced "Ps-alme".

Of Daye, Isaiah Thomas wrote: "In 1642, he owned several lots of land 'in the bounds of Cambridge'. He mortgaged one of those lots as security for the payment of a cow, calf, and a heifer; whence, we may conclude, he was not in very affluent circumstances." Daye also had a criminal record and several lawsuits that were filed by Daye after he left the printing press still exist.

Daye worked at the press until 1648, several years after Elizabeth's death. Henry Dunster took over the management of the press. It is unknown whether Daye left voluntarily or because Dunster was dissatisfied at his work. Subsequent operation of the press was handed over to Samuel Green.

== Printed documents ==
With Elizabeth's press operational only months after its arrival in Cambridge, the first printed documents became available. In early 1639, Governor John Winthrop recorded in his journal:

Mo. 1 (March).] A printing house was begun at Cambridge by one Daye, at the charge of Mr. Glover, who died on seas hitherward. The first thing which was printed was the freemen's oath; the next was an almanac made for New England by Mr. William Peirce, mariner; the next was the Psalms newly turned into the metre.

The Oath of a Freeman, An Almenack, and the Bay Psalm Book have become three of the most valuable documents ever printed. While originals of the first two have been lost over time, original copies of the Bay Psalm Book sell for millions of dollars today.

=== Oath of a Freeman ===
Written by Winthrop, the oath was taken by every man who was over the age of twenty and a householder for at least six months. Taking the oath made them a freeman of the corporation and legal citizen of the Massachusetts Bay Company.

Besides the original handwritten copy penned by Winthrop, no copy of this document exists today. The only surviving printed copy is from a reprint done in 1647. This reprint is found in the book New England's Jonas cast up at London 1647 and contains a record of the proceedings of the Boston court. Oath of a Freeman can be found on pages 24 and 25.

In 1985, a man named Mark Hoffman claimed to have found two original printed copies of Oath of a Freeman. After trying to sell a copy to the Library of Congress for $1.5 million, the copies were found to be forgeries. Hoffman was later found guilty of fraud and sentenced to prison in Salt Lake City, Utah.

A.B., being, by Gods providence, an inhabitant & ffreeman within the jurisdiccon of this comonweale, doe freely acknowledge my selfe to be subiect to the govermt thereof, & therefore doe heere sweare, by the greate & dreadfull name of the eurlyving God, that I wilbe true & faithfull to the same, & will accordingly yeilde assistance & support therevnto, with my pson & estate, as in equity I am bound, & will also truely indeavr to mainetaine & preserue all the libertyes & previlidges thereof, submitting my selfe to the wholesome lawes & orders made & established by the same; and furthr, that I will not plott nor practise any evill against it, nor consent to any that shall soe doe, but will timely discovery & reveale the same lawfull aucthority nowe here established, for the speedy preventing thereof. Moreouer, I doe solemnly binde myselfe in the sight of God, that when I shalbe called to giue my voice touching any such matter of this state, wherein ffreemen are to deale I will giue my vote & suffrage, as I shall iudge in myne owne conscience may best conduce & tend to the publique weale of the body, without respect of psons, or favr of any man. Soe helpe mee God in the Lord Jesus Christ.

=== An Almenack ===
According to Robert F. Roden, Captain William Pierce was "one of the most esteemed and accomplished navigators of his time, master of three of the five ships that brought the first settlers to New England, and an intimate of Bradford, Winslow, and Winthrop". In 1639, Pierce wrote An Almenack for the Year 1639. Unfortunately, no copies of this almanac exist.

=== Bay Psalm Book ===
One publication that came from Glover's press is the Bay Psalm Book. The full title of the book reads, "The Psalms in Metre, Faithfully translated for the Use, Edification, and Comfort of the Saints in Publick and Private, especially in New England. 1640." It was the first book printed in America. The text for this book was translated into meter by Richard Mather, minister of the church in Dorchester; John Eliot, historically famous as the "Indian Apostle" who started in Roxbury; and Thomas Welde, who also ministered in Roxbury.

The introduction to the Applewood Books copy of the Bay Psalm Book reads:

The cost of printing the seventeen hundred copies was £33, that one hundred and sixteen reams of paper were used, valued at £29, that the book sold at twenty pence per copy, and that the total receipts from sales were estimated at 141 13s. 4d., leaving a profit of 79 13s. 4d.

Out of the 1,700 copies printed, only eleven copies are known to exist, and many are in poor condition.

After Elizabeth's death in 1643, the press was used much less. Samuel Morison notes: "The fact that Sam Nowell of the Class of August 9, 1653, had his 'study in the printing roome' indicates that the press had very little business; which Stephen Day's accounts show to be the case." It was Elizabeth's passion to see the press’s success that brought about the printing of these important documents. It is unclear why she chose an oath, an almanac, and the psalms.

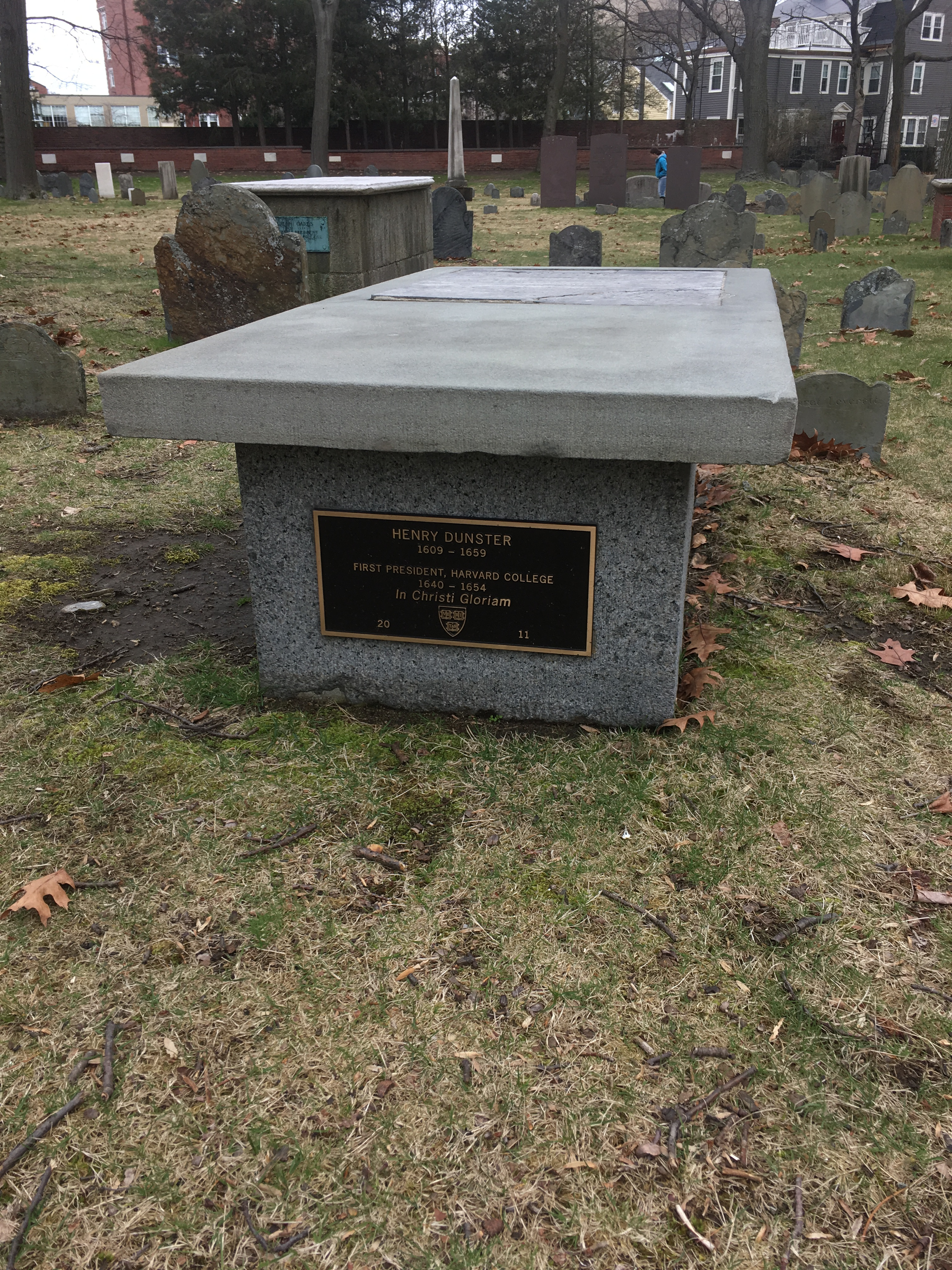
The grave of Dunster in Massachusetts. Dunster was the second husband of Elizabeth and the first president of Harvard University. He died in 1654.

== Marriage to Henry Dunster ==
Henry Dunster was the son of a yeoman in Ford, Lancashire. He was baptized on November 29, 1609. At age of seventeen, he attended Magdalene College in Cambridge, England. As described by Samuel Morison:

Like so many country boys who find themselves in a great university, Henry entered into the fascinating game of acquiring knowledge with more zeal than discretion – at least so he thought in later years. 'Growing more careless,' he ceased to think of Christ.

After graduating from Cambridge in 1634, Dunster became a teacher in Bury, Lancashire, where he grew up. He doubted his religious beliefs, saying, "As corruptions in the church came I began to suspect them, then to hate them. But here was my falseness that I was loath to read such bookes as might make me see such truths, but the Lord helped me..." In the summer of 1640, Dunster left for New England; he lived in Massachusetts only three weeks before becoming President of Harvard University. As Morison writes:

It would be interesting to know why Dunster was chosen – what evidence he had given of those remarkable qualities he was to show as a teacher and administrator, or what there was in his personality that appealed to the Overseers...Dunster possessed but one visible asset, a master’s degree...He belonged to an obscure family of a county that sent few emigrants to New England; and he was proud of his native Lancashire...He had published nothing, shone with no reflected glory...Yet, after all the magistrates and elders by the summer of 1640 may have felt so desperate a need of someone to revive the College as to draft any well-appearing university man who seemed likely to accept.

On June 22, 1641, Elizabeth and Dunster were married, and Dunster moved into Elizabeth's home. They had no children, but Dunster helped educate Elizabeth's children and stepchildren.

When he married Elizabeth, Dunster became the co-owner of the printing press. Upon Elizabeth's death, he dismissed Daye and made Daye's son, Matthew, in charge of the press. When Matthew died in 1649, Dunster appointed Samuel Green as the new steward of the press. From Green, Dunster commissioned a reprint of the Bay Psalm Book in 1651, perhaps in memory of his first wife. Dunster later gifted the press to Harvard College, and thus Harvard University Press was born.

Dunster's rebellious religious beliefs eventually caught up with him. His disagreements on scripture and religion forced him to part ways with Harvard. Centuries later, Harvard's 21st president, Charles William Eliot, said of Dunster:

Two Hundred and forty-five years ago, Henry Dunster, the first president of Harvard College, was turned out of his office by the Congregationalists, who then ruled Massachusetts, because he had ceased to believe in infant baptism, finding adult baptism more scriptural and edifying. He was turned out on a cold, rough, thankless world after fourteen years of the most devoted service, under the most adverse conditions; but today Dunster is one of Harvard's saints and heroes, and for a hundred years Harvard has been devoted in every fiber of her body and every drop of her blood, to freedom of thought and speech.

As Morison states:

The College certainly owes a debt of gratitude to the widow Glover, whose love cheered the first president in his well-nigh impossible undertaking, and whose property enabled him and the College to carry on.

After Elizabeth's death, Dunster continued his crisis of faith to the point that he showed open opposition to Reverend Jonathan Mitchell, Harvard graduate and minister. Their quarrels eventually led Dunster to leave his Harvard presidency. When Dunster died in 1659, Dunster and Mitchell's stories intertwine further, as some speculate that the grave attributed to Dunster actually contains Mitchell's remains, although there is no proof to support the claim.

== Death ==
Elizabeth died on June 23, 1643. Her burial place in Cambridge is place marked only by a decaying gravestone. Elizabeth was survived by her two children, three stepchildren, Dunster, and the printing business.

Upon her death, Elizabeth's property, including the press, became the subject of several lawsuits. Elizabeth's first husband, Joseph, stated in his final will and testament that all his property should go to Elizabeth, with the instruction that upon her death the property would go to his children.

When Elizabeth died, Dunster took ownership of all her possessions, including the press. John Glover, Elizabeth and Joseph’s son, filed a lawsuit against Dunster, his stepfather, to reclaim his inheritance. Dunster counter-sued for the expense it took to raise and educate his five stepchildren. He argued in his lawsuit that since he had paid for Elizabeth's funeral, repairs on their house, and other everyday expenses he shared with her and her children, he was not obliged to share the remaining fund with the children.

In the end, the court ruled in favor of Elizabeth's children. John Hruschka notes, "Dunster simply ignored the court ruling and retained most of the value of the estate and possession of the press." Before further legal action could be taken against Dunster, John died in London.
