= Manfred Ehrich =

American politician (1914–2012)

Member of the Vermont Senate
- In office 1994–1997

Personal details
- Born: November 2, 1914 New York, New York, U.S.
- Died: May 15, 2012 (aged 97) Manchester Center, Vermont, U.S.
- Party: Republican
- Education: Yale College; Harvard Law School

Manfred Ehrich (November 2, 1914 – May 15, 2012) was an American politician. He served as a member of the Vermont Senate, representing Bennington, Vermont.
