= Emerald Lake State Park =

State park in Vermont, United States

- Location within Vermont
- Interactive map of Emerald Lake State Park
- Location: Dorset, Vermont, United States
- Coordinates: 43°16′49″N 73°0′20″W
- Area: 430 acres (170 ha)
- Opened: 1960
- Administrator: Vermont Department of Forests, Parks, and Recreation
- Website: Official website
- Vermont State Parks

Emerald Lake State Park is a 430-acre (170 ha) state park in the town of Dorset, Vermont, United States, 3 miles (5 km) north of the village of East Dorset. It is the home of 20-acre (8.1 ha) Emerald Lake, called such because of its emerald color. Activities includes swimming, non-motorized boating, camping, fishing, hiking, picnicking, bicycling, wildlife watching, and winter sports. Facilities include 67 campsites and 37 lean-tos, flush toilets, hot showers, and a dump station. There is a small beach with a snack bar and boat rental facilities, a picnic pavilion with two group grills and a smaller grill, other picnic tables, and a horseshoe pit. There is a nature center, and park rangers offer interpretive programs including night hikes, campfire programs, amphibian explorations, and nature crafts and games.

The state has designated 4 acres (1.6 ha) as the Emerald Lake Natural Area, on a steep bank at the south end of the park. The old-growth forest here features hemlock, sugar maples and other hardwood species, and there are several trees of noteworthy age and size.
