= Mount Aeolus (Vermont) =

Mountain in Vermont, United States

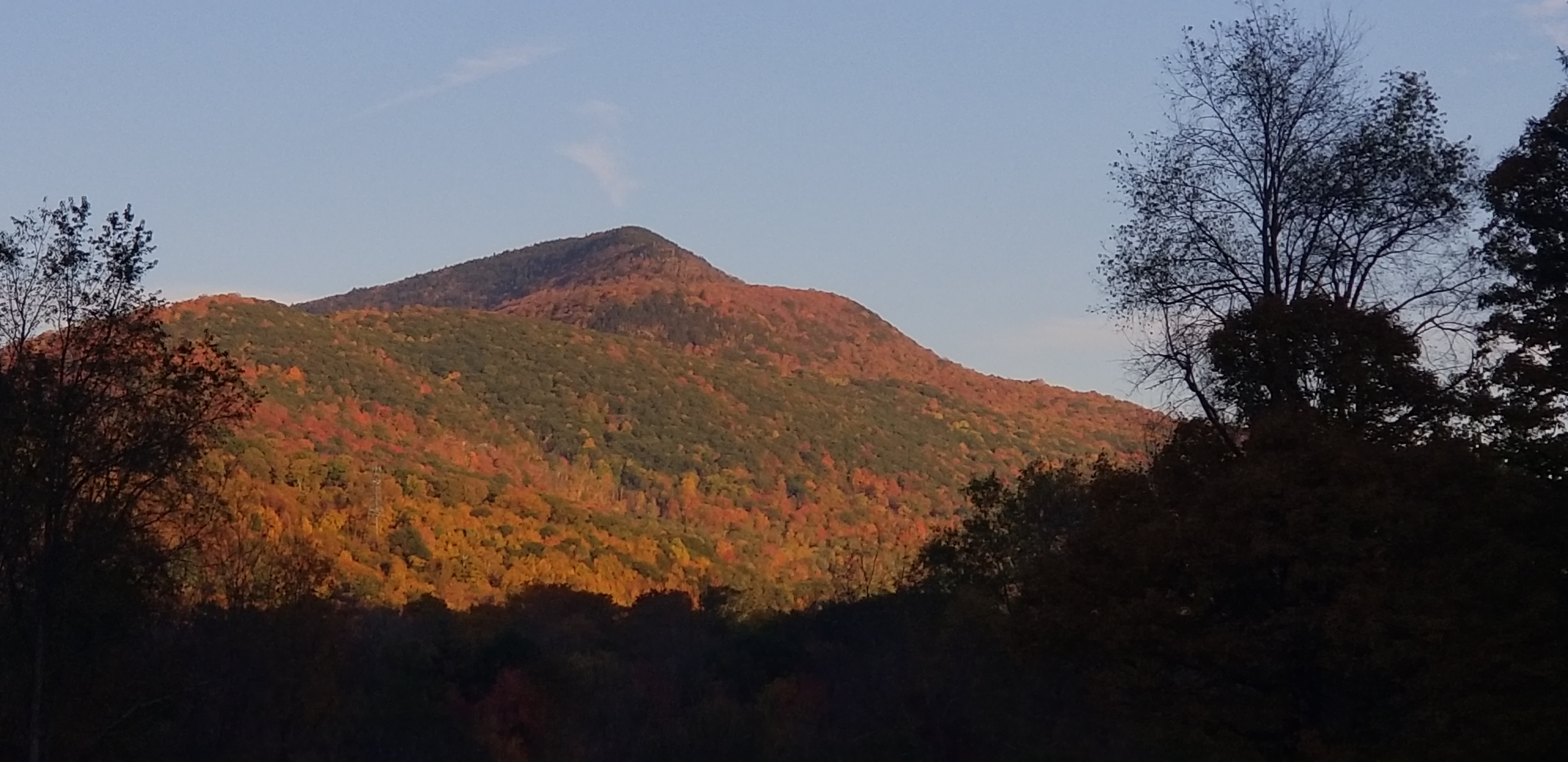
- Western face of Mount Aeolus in October 2021.

Highest point
- Elevation: 3,230 ft (980 m) NGVD 29
- Prominence: 1,150 ft (350 m)
- Coordinates: 43°14′26″N 73°02′19″W

Geography
- Location within Vermont
- Location: Dorset, Bennington County, Vermont
- Parent range: Taconic Range
- Topo map: USGS Manchester

Mount Aeolus is a mountain summit in Dorset, Bennington County, Vermont, United States. Mount Aeolus is one of the Taconic Mountains. It lies 1.5 miles (2.4 km) west of the community of East Dorset.

== Name ==
Its name is derived from Aeolus, the Greek god of the wind. The Board on Geographic Names ruled in favor of the current name in 1986; prior to that time, the mountain had been referred to as "Mount Eolus" and "Green Peak".
