= Bay Psalm Book =

Psalter first printed in 1640 in Cambridge, Massachusetts

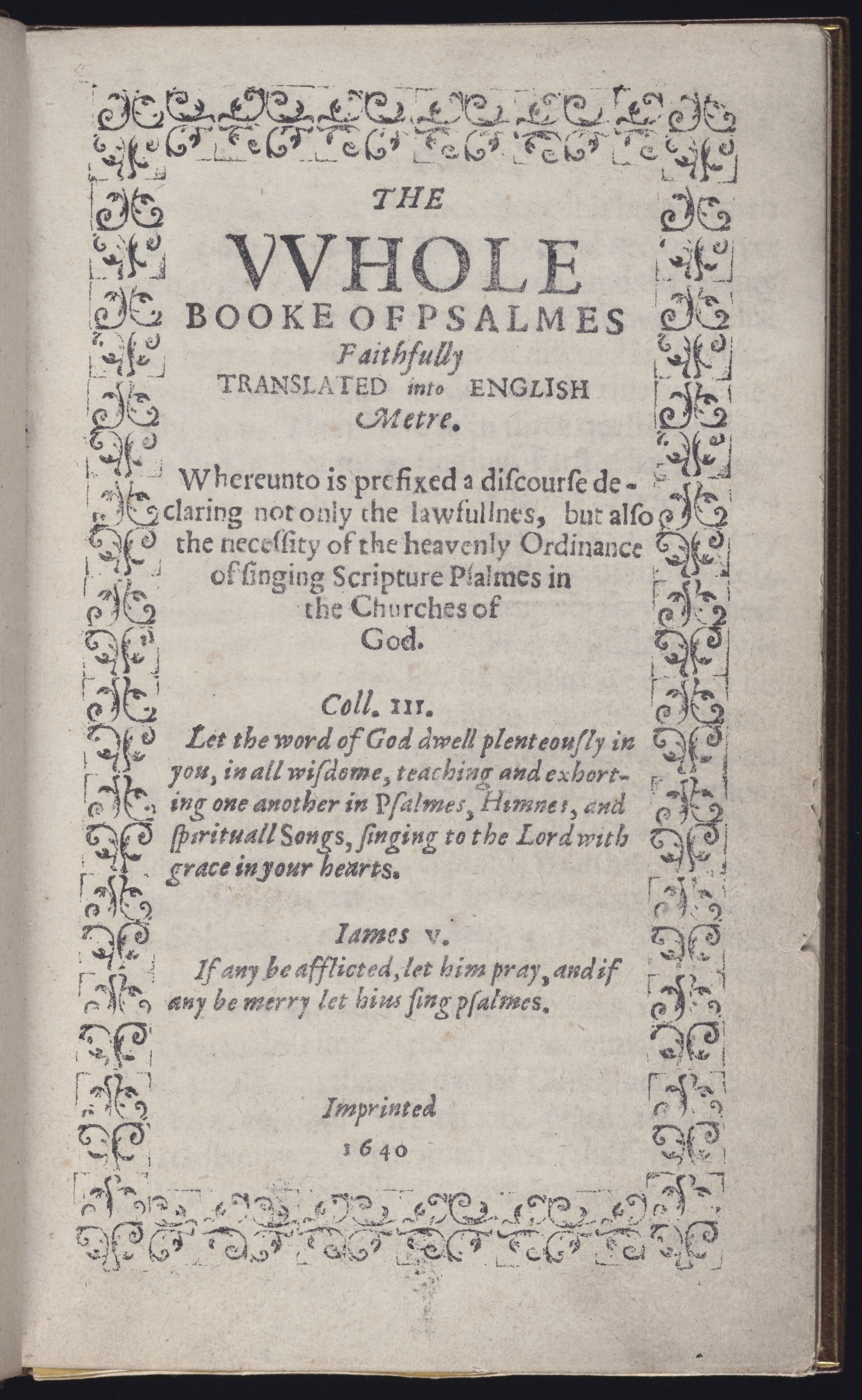
Title page of the copy of the Bay Psalm Book held by the Beinecke Rare Book and Manuscript Library

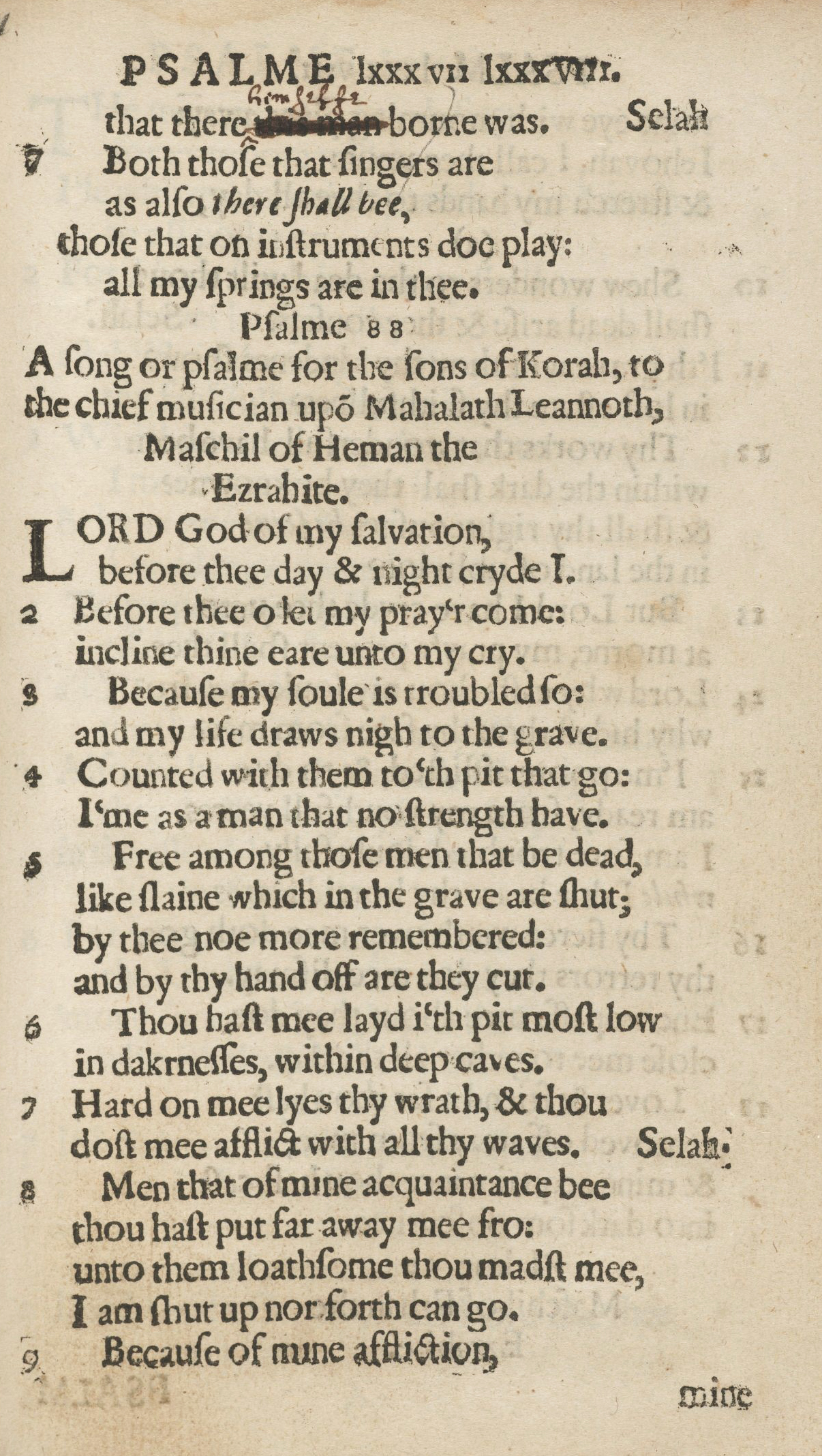
a page of the Bay Psalm Book in the Houghton Library

The Whole Booke of Psalmes Faithfully Translated into English Metre, commonly called the Bay Psalm Book, is a metrical psalter first printed in 1640 in Cambridge, Colony of Massachusetts Bay. It was the first book printed in British North America. The psalms in it are metrical translations into English. The translations are not particularly polished, and none have remained in use, although some of the tunes to which they were sung have survived. Its production, however, just 20 years after the Pilgrims' arrival at Plymouth, Massachusetts, represents a considerable achievement. It went through several editions and remained in use for well over a century.

In November 2013, one of eleven known surviving copies of the first edition sold at auction for $14.2 million, a record for a printed book.

== History ==
=== 17th century ===
The early residents of the Massachusetts Bay Colony brought with them several books of psalms: the Ainsworth Psalter (1612), compiled by Henry Ainsworth for use by Puritan "separatists" in Holland; the Ravenscroft Psalter (1621); and the Sternhold and Hopkins Psalter (1562), of which there were several editions. Evidently they were dissatisfied with the translations from Hebrew in these several psalters and wished for some that were closer to the original. They hired "thirty pious and learned Ministers", including Richard Mather, Thomas Mayhew, and John Eliot, to undertake a new translation, which they presented here. The tunes to be sung to the new translations were the familiar ones from their existing psalters.

The first printing was the third product of the printing press in Cambridge, the first and only press in the colonies, which was owned by Elizabeth Glover and managed by Stephen Daye. The book consisted of a 148 small quarto leaves, including a 12-page preface, "The Psalmes in Metre", "An Admonition to the Reader", and an extensive list of errata headed "Faults escaped in printing". Subsequent editions were explicitly printed for sale in Boston by the first bookseller in British America, Hezekiah Usher, and it is hypothesized that Usher may have also intended to sell this first edition from his shop in Cambridge. An estimated 1,700 copies of the first edition were printed.

The third edition (1651) was extensively revised by Henry Dunster and Richard Lyon. The revision was entitled The Psalms, hymns and spiritual songs of the Old and New Testament, faithfully translated into English metre. This revision was the basis for all subsequent editions, and was popularly known as the New England Psalter or New England Version. The ninth edition (1698), the first to contain notated music (rather than simply identifying tunes by name), included 13 tunes from John Playford's A Breefe Introduction to the Skill of Musick (London, 1654).

=== 18th century ===
The expansion of the neoclassical movement in England led to an evolution in the singing of psalms. These changes found their way to America and subsequently new psalm versions were written. In the early part of the 18th century, several updated psalms, notably those written by Tate and Brady and by Isaac Watts, were published. Shortly thereafter several congregations in New England elected to replace the Bay Psalm Book with these new titles.

In 1718, Cotton Mather undertook the revision of the original Bay Psalm Book which he had studied since youth. Two subsequent revisions were published in 1752, by John Barnard of Marblehead and in 1758 by Thomas Prince. Prince was a clergyman at the Old South Church in Boston. He convinced the members of the congregation of the need to produce a revised, more scholarly, edition of the Bay Psalm Book. However, Prince's version was not accepted outside of his membership and in 1789, the Old South Church reverted to the earlier edition published by Isaac Watts.

== Title page ==
The title page of the first edition of 1640 reads:

The Whole Booke of Psalmes

Faithfully
TRANSLATED into ENGLISH
Metre.
Whereunto is prefixed a discourse
declaring not only the lawfullness, but also
the necessity of the heavenly Ordinance
of singing Scripture Psalmes in
the Churches of God.

Imprinted, 1640

== An example of the text ==
"Psalm 23" provides an example of the translation, style and versification of the text of the Bay Psalm Book:

The Lord to me a shepherd is,
want therefore shall not I:
He in the folds of tender grass,
doth cause me down to lie:
To waters calm me gently leads
restore my soul doth he:
He doth in paths of righteousness
for his name’s sake lead me.
Yea, though in valley of death’s shade
I walk, none ill I’ll fear:
Because thou art with me, thy rod,
and staff my comfort are.
For me a table thou hast spread,
in presence of my foes:
Thou dost anoint my head with oil;
my cup it overflows.
Goodness and mercy surely shall
all my days follow me:
And in the Lord’s house I shall dwell
so long as days shall be.

== Extant copies and auction records ==
Eleven copies of the first edition of the Bay Psalm Book are still known to exist, of which only five copies are complete. Only one of the eleven copies is currently held outside the United States. One copy is owned by each of the following:

Owner/Library	Image	Notes
Library of Congress		This copy is lacking the title page and 18 leaves.
Beinecke Rare Book & Manuscript Library, Yale University		This copy was owned by Old South Church in Boston between 1750 and 1850, before passing through a number of hands (Edward A. Crowninshield, then by Henry Stevens, then by George Brinley of Hartford, then by Cornelius Vanderbilt), finally being bought by Cornelius Vanderbilt II in 1879. It was eventually inherited by Gertrude Vanderbilt Whitney and owned by her until her death in 1942. It was bought for Yale University in 1947, at a price of $151,000, by the Friends of the Library of Yale University.
Houghton Library, Harvard University		Thought to have been acquired in the effort to replace Harvard's library, after its destruction by fire in 1764. It was previously owned by Middlecott Cooke, a member of the Harvard class of 1723. It carries the signature of John Leverett, suggesting it may have belonged to John Leverett, the 19th governor of the Massachusetts Bay Colony. The copy is incomplete, missing 10 leaves.
John Carter Brown Library, Brown University		Originally the property of Richard Mather, one of the original translators, it passed into the ownership of Thomas Prince (possibly after the dispersal of the library of Cotton Mather, grandson of Richard, in 1728. It was eventually acquired by John Carter Brown in 1881.
American Antiquarian Society		This copy lacks its title page and pages 295–296, but is in its original vellum binding. It was part of a lot of old books bought by William Bentley in May 1804 for 36 cents. It later became part of the library of Isiah Thomas, the founder of the society, and still carries his bookplate. He later gave it to the society.
New York Public Library		This copy was found when the stock of British bookseller William Pickering was sold by Sotheby's in 1855 in London after his death. It was part of a parcel of old copies of psalms that was bought for 19 shillings by Henry Stevens. It had twelve leaves missing, but Stevens replaced them with leaves taken from the copy now in the Library of Congress, then sold it to James Lenox. The book was part of the Lenox Library until this became part of the New York Public Library in 1895.
Bodleian Library, University of Oxford		Formerly the property of Bishop Thomas Tanner, this complete copy was part of the valuable book collection bequeathed to the Bodlean Library in Oxford upon his death in 1735. This is the only copy outside the United States.
Huntington Library		An 1844 note laid into the book by one Sara Shuttleworth records it was previously in the possession of the Shuttleworth family, and she was passing it to her daughter. It was acquired by an antique book store in Boston in 1872; they sold it 20 years later to Bishop John Fletcher Hurst. It was bought by E. Dwight Church in 1903. In 1911, Henry E. Huntington acquired a large portion of Church's library, including the Bay Psalm Book. It was transferred to the Huntington library as part of the establishment gift in 1919.
Rosenbach Museum & Library		The most recently discovered copy, this was sold in 1933 to the Rosenbach Company for £150 by a James Weatherup of Belfast. Signatures indicate it had been previously owned by several individuals from Belfast and Glasgow. In 1949, it was briefly stolen by a UCLA student as part of a fraternity initiation.
Old South Church in Boston		This book was bequeathed to Old South Church in 1758 by Thomas Prince. It is housed in the Rare Book Collection at the Boston Public Library and was fully digitized in 2026.
David Rubenstein		This 1640 copy of the Bay Psalm Book, one of two owned by Boston's Old South Church, was auctioned off by Sotheby's in November 2013 for a hammer price of $14.165 million. Rubenstein, the buyer, is an American billionaire financier and philanthropist. The sale set a new record for a single printed book, and surpassed the previous record set in 2010 ($11.5 million for John James Audubon's The Birds of America). Rubenstein loaned the book to the National Museum of American History.

== See also ==
- Codex Leicester, which holds the record for the sale price of any book
- Metrical psalter
- List of most expensive books and manuscripts
