= Walter Hard =

American poet and politician

Member of the Vermont Senate
- In office 1939–1946

Member of the Vermont House of Representatives
- In office 1937–1938

Personal details
- Occupation: Politician, poet

Walter Hard was an American poet and politician. He served in the Vermont House of Representatives from 1937 to 1938 and in the Vermont Senate from 1939 to 1946.
