= East Dorset, Vermont =

Census-designated place in Vermont, United States

- Census-designated place
- Location within Vermont Location within the United States
- Coordinates: 43°14′51″N 73°00′12″W
- Country: United States
- State: Vermont
- County: Bennington
- Town: Dorset

Area
  - Total: 2.24 sq mi (5.79 km^{2})
  - Land: 2.22 sq mi (5.76 km^{2})
  - Water: 0.012 sq mi (0.03 km^{2})
- Elevation: 787 ft (240 m)
- Time zone: UTC-5 (Eastern (EST))
  - Summer (DST): UTC-4 (EDT)
- ZIP Code: 05253
- Area code: 802
- FIPS code: 50-20350
- GNIS feature ID: 2805700

East Dorset is an unincorporated community and census-designated place (CDP) in the town of Dorset, Bennington County, Vermont, United States. It was first listed as a CDP prior to the 2020 census. As of the 2020 census, East Dorset had a population of 296.

It is in northern Bennington County, in the eastern part of the town of Dorset, in a valley between Mount Aeolus of the Taconic Mountains to the west and the Green Mountains to the east. The Batten Kill rises at East Dorset and flows south and west to the Hudson River in New York.

U.S. Route 7 passes through East Dorset, leading north 26 miles (42 km) to Rutland and south 28 miles (45 km) to Bennington.

East Dorset is home to the first marble quarries in the United States. It is also the birthplace of Bill Wilson, co-founder of Alcoholics Anonymous.
