= Brandreth Pill Factory =

- U.S. National Register of Historic Places
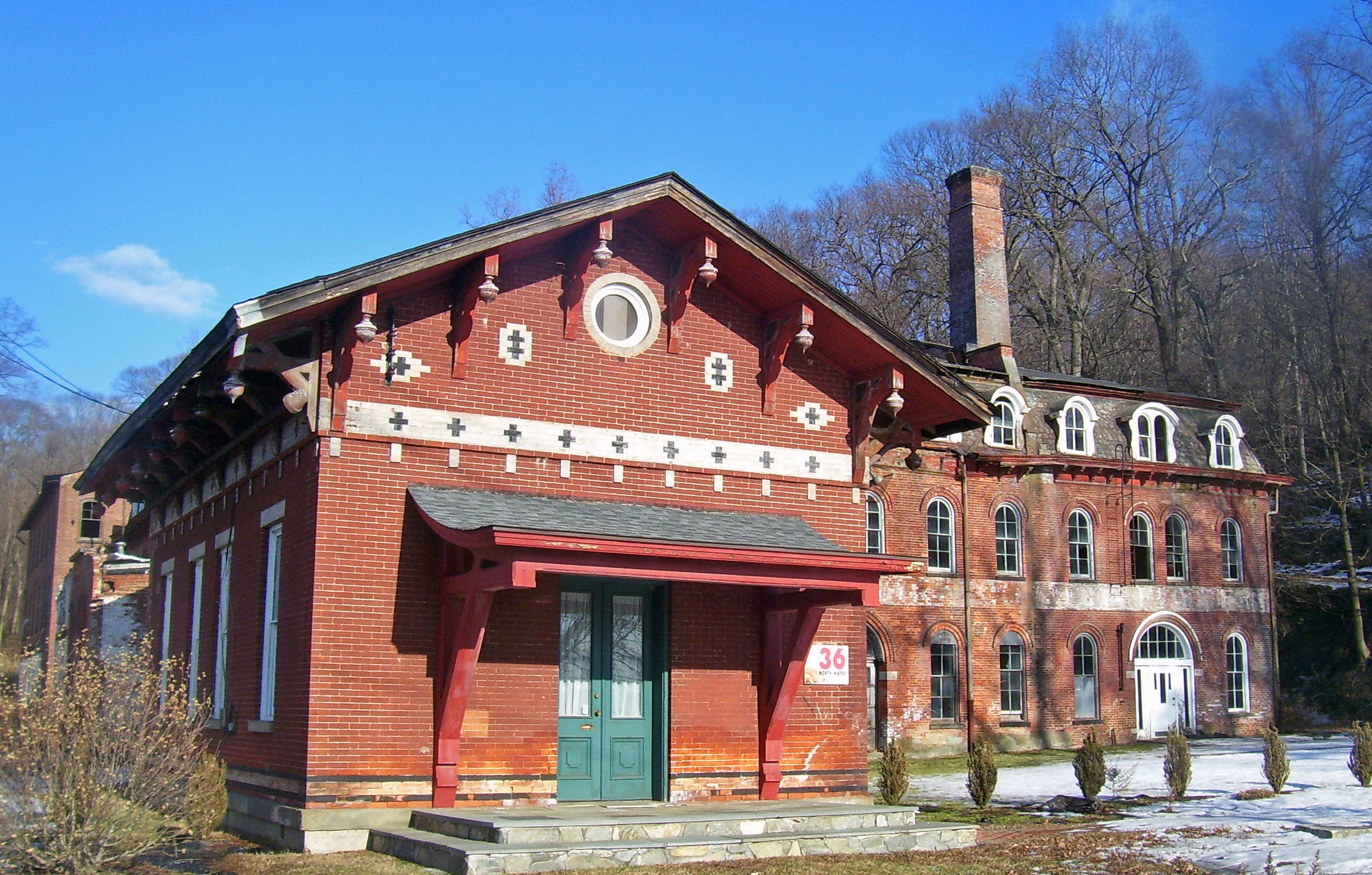
- A 2009 view of the west elevations of office and main building, partially demolished in 2015

- Location within New York Location within the United States
- Location: Water St., Ossining, New York
- Coordinates: 41°9′58″N 73°52′10″W
- Area: 5.6 acres (2.3 ha)
- Built: 1836–86
- Architect: Calvin Pollard
- Architectural style: Greek Revival, Second Empire, Italianate
- NRHP reference No.: 80002792
- Added to NRHP: January 10, 1980

The former Brandreth Pill Factory is a historic industrial complex located on Water Street in Ossining, New York, United States. It consists of several brick buildings from the 19th century, in a variety of contemporary architectural styles. In 1980 it was listed on the National Register of Historic Places.

Most of the original buildings succumbed to fire in the 1870s, but the oldest, a Greek Revival building possibly designed by Calvin Pollard in the 1830s, remains. Nearby is a corrugated iron structure that may be the earliest use of that material in Westchester County. The main building itself was one of the first to have Otis elevators installed.

Benjamin Brandreth made his family's popular medicine, said to treat blood impurities, at the factory, starting in the 1830s. The factory's construction was the beginning of the industrial development of the Ossining waterfront. It continued to be used for manufacturing until the 1940s. Some of the smaller buildings remain in use today, although the former main building is vacant.

The village had been considering a proposal to convert the main factory building to green housing. After a proposal to do so failed to gain approval, due in part to flooding concerns in the wake of Hurricane Sandy in 2012, the owners demolished part of the building in 2015. The village claimed it was illegal as the permit had expired; the owners claimed otherwise. The building was fully demolished in 2016.

== Buildings and grounds ==
The 5.6-acre (2.3 ha) site stretches along the north end of Water Street on Ossining's waterfront, close to the Hudson River and the railroad tracks of Metro-North's Hudson Line and Amtrak's Empire Service. With the exception of a modern warehouse facility at the end of the street, north of the old main building, they are the only buildings in the area, some still used for industrial or commercial purposes. The land is level due to the proximity of the river; Water Street generally follows the lower edge of a steep wooded bluff to the north end of the site, where a stream flows into the Hudson and opens a wide gorge.

Just past the fork to Solitude Lane, about 400 feet (120 m) north of the intersection with Snowden Avenue and Westerly Road, are the first set of buildings. Between the street and the tracks is a gable-roofed one-story brick storage building with segmental-arched windows. East of the street is a group of small buildings that constituted the factory in its earliest days—Brandreth's office (now demolished), a mixing and packing building, a box-making building and the storage facility that is the oldest building of the group.

Set back a short distance are two single-story buildings. The northerly of the pair is a Carpenter Gothic-styled one-story structure with a gabled roof, board-and-batten siding and lancet arched windows in the gables. It was used to dry pills and make boxes, and as office space. It has been modified greatly since its construction. The southerly is a flat-roofed brick building used for pill manufacture.

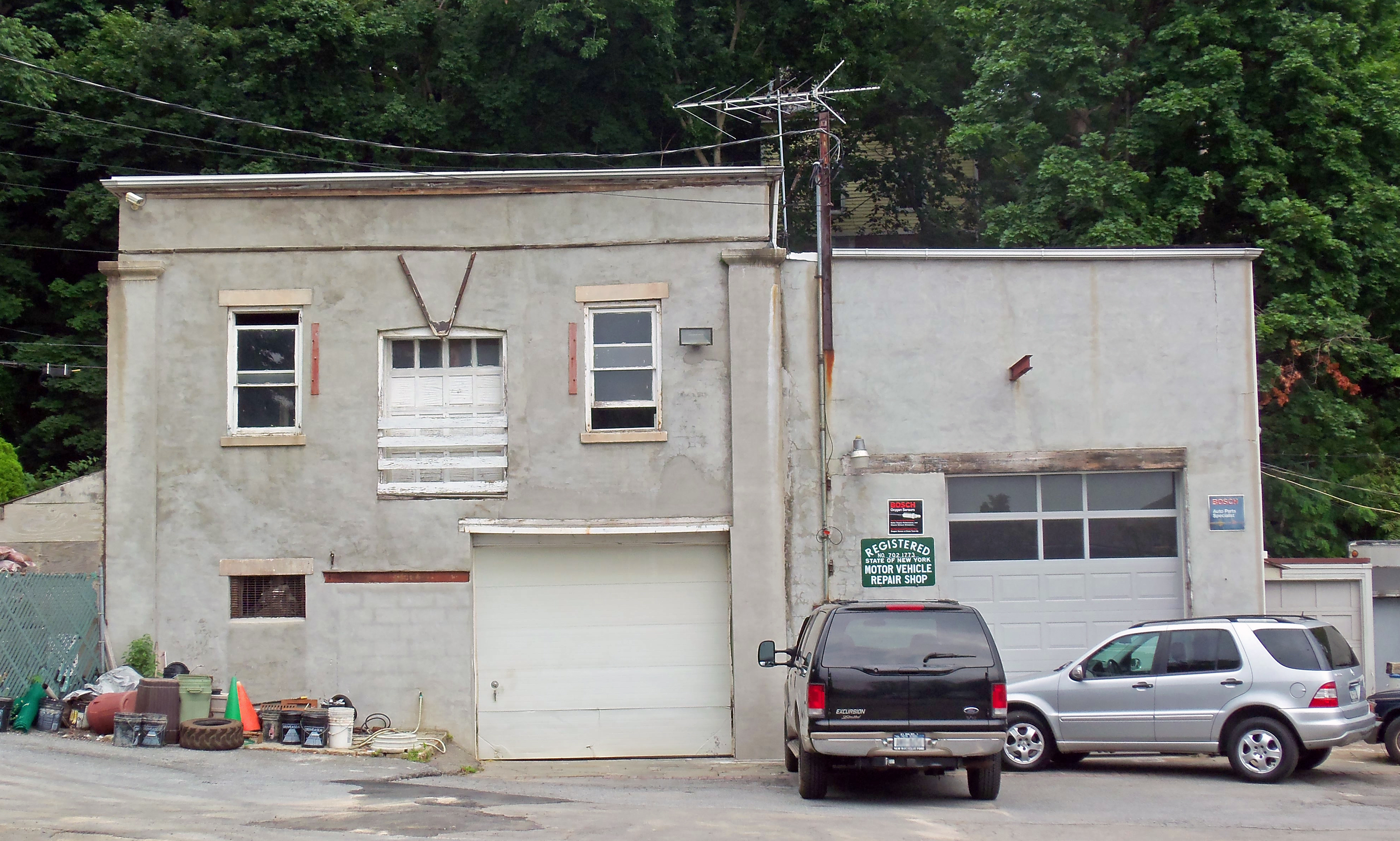
Oldest building in complex

To their east, at the edge of the woods, is the oldest building in the factory complex. It is a two-story three-by-three-bay flat-roofed structure. Doric pilasters at each corner, along with three at evenly spaced intervals along between windows along the north and south facades, support a blank entablature below the roof. Their granite bases and capitals complement the granite sills and lintels on the windows. A modern concrete block addition is attached to the south. Inside, it retains much of its original furnishing.

Another 150 feet (46 m) to the north, also between the road and the tracks, is a corrugated iron storage facility built on the original factory site. Its framing, visible on the exterior, consists of timber wrapped in iron. In both roof gables are simple classically inspired designs, also of iron-wrapped wood.

Further along Water, another 300 feet (91 m), on the east, is the joined complex of three buildings that included the three-story main building. It was an L-shaped three-story brick structure with a slate-covered mansard roof pierced by four brick chimneys. The tallest, near the south end of the L, rises two additional stories above the roof. Windows and doors had brick hood lintels; above the cast iron cornice supported by pendanted brackets were hooded dormer windows in the roof. Inside there was exposed original brick, segmental-arched entryways, walnut and cast iron roof columns and exposed roof framing.

The main building had two additions: a one-story machine shop on the north side of the western corner, and a large two-story section with a corrugated iron gabled roof and segmental-arched windows without lintels extending east from the north end. The cleared sites of other additions, as well as several buildings in the bend of the L to the east, are still extant.

To the west of the building, at the street, is a small brick office building with a granite water table. It is one and a half stories high, three bays by four, with a gabled roof supported by large wooden pendanted brackets. Its decoration also includes a course of painted brickwork crosses setting off an entablature above in the gable fields with some other isolated brickwork crosses. Fenestration consists of rectangular windows with granite sills and lintels along the north and south profiles, with an oculus in the gable apex. Stone steps lead to the paneled wooden and glass doors, sheltered by a curved canopy supported by large brackets at the sides. Inside the remaining original features include intricately molded woodwork and ceiling medallions, door hardware and a vault with a stone floor and brick walls.

== History ==
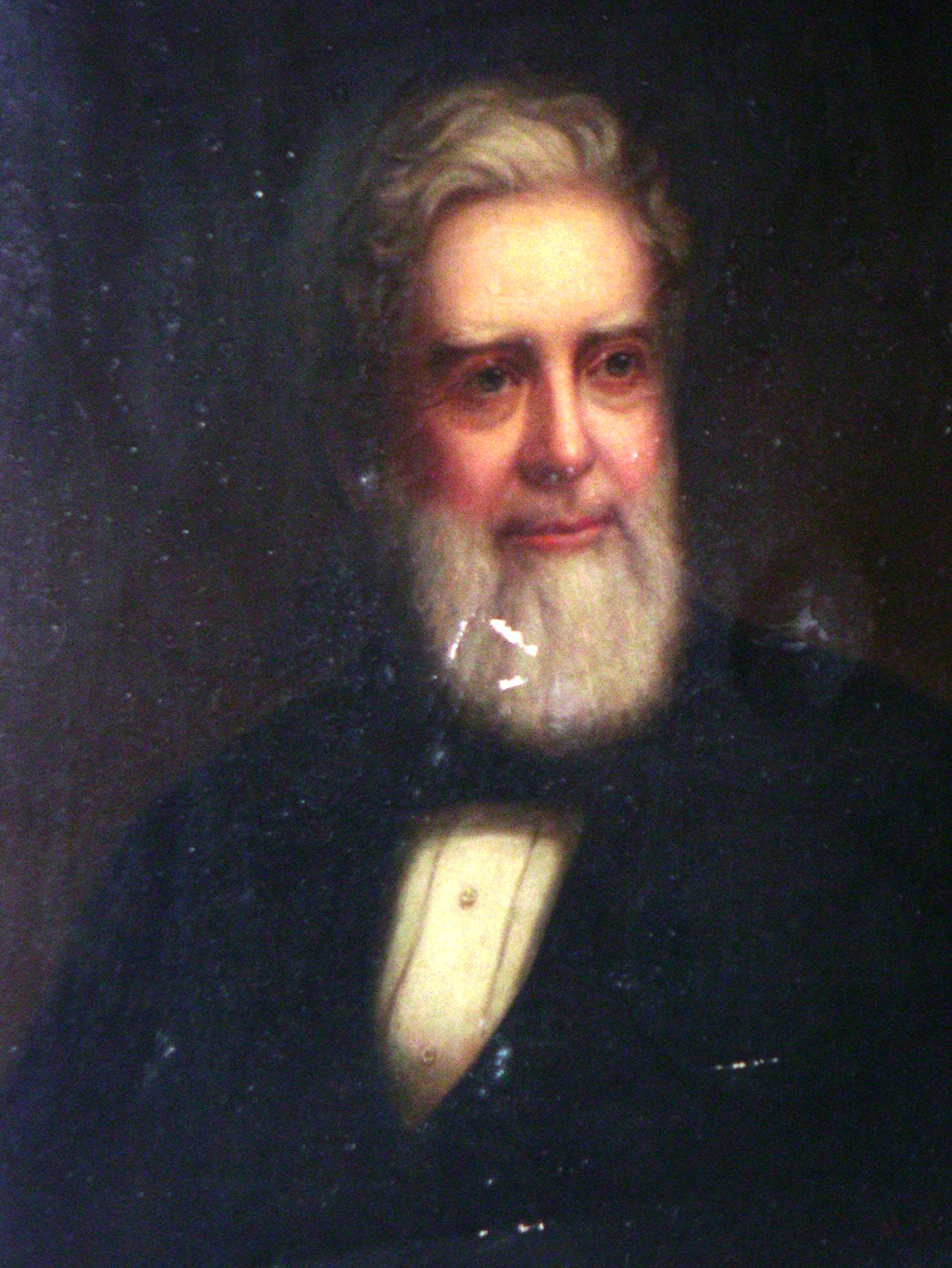
Benjamin Brandreth

While the factory did not start out as Brandreth's, it became associated with him by the mid-19th century and remained so through the main building's partial demolition in the early 21st century.

=== 1835–1939: Brandreth years ===
Benjamin Brandreth was born in Newtown, Derbyshire, England and was raised in Liverpool by his maternal grandparents. He took over the patent medicine business started by his grandfather in the 1820s. He pioneered the use of advertising with testimonials to the effectiveness of the pills' treatment of the blood impurities thought to create disease at the time, and developed a growing presence in the English and American markets. In 1835 he moved to New York with his family.

His success continued, and the following year he moved to Ossining, then known as Sing Sing, to acquire all the land the remaining buildings sit on, and build a factory. By 1837 he was working from two buildings, one of which is the Greek Revival building that still stands in the cluster of buildings east of the street at the south end of the site. It may have been designed by Calvin Pollard, who built two houses in Ossining for Brandreth (neither extant) during this period as well as St. Paul's Episcopal Church downtown. An early engraving, used in his ads, depicts the building as having three stories and a cupola. It was right on the shore of the Hudson.

Brandreth may have found Sing Sing not only a beautiful place to do business but a strategic one as well. Agricultural produce shipped down to its active river port could be used as the vegetable base of the pills, and those pills could then be shipped down to New York City. At the time, there were also mining and quarrying operations, particularly at the new Sing Sing Prison, on the riverside, but Brandreth's manufacture of finished goods at his facility made his the first true industrial facility on the Ossining waterfront.

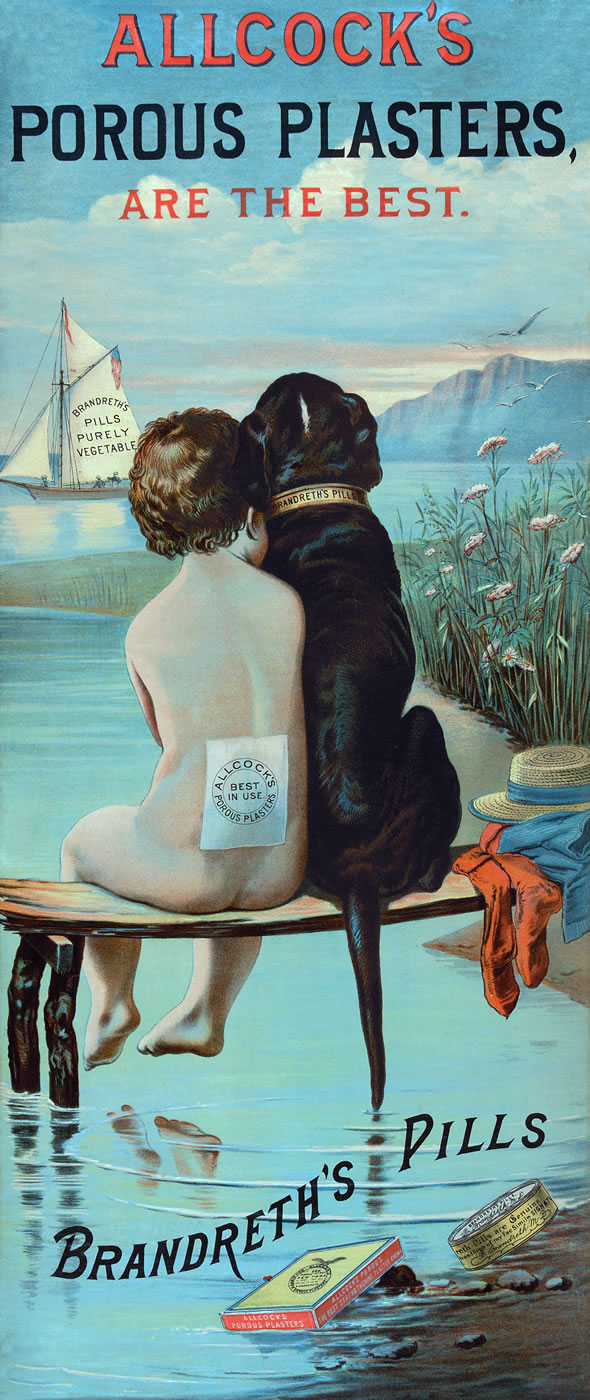
An 1885 ad for the pills and plasters

After an 1838 trip down the Mississippi River to sell pills, the business grew even more. Brandreth became a naturalized U.S. citizen in 1840, and became active in the politics of the growing village. He served as its president for three years, and later was elected to two separate terms in the State Senate. In 1848, he purchased an interest in fellow English American Thomas Allcock's Porous Plasters and began developing a facility to manufacture them on an old mill site further up the river. The Hudson River Railroad was being built through Sing Sing that year, further extending the company's reach and filling in the riverfront to provide a stable, straight surface for tracks. The latter opened more land for future building in the process.

The factory's expansion served it well for the next two decades. It continued to produce 1.2 million boxes of pills annually, each of which retailed for 25 cents ($10 in modern dollars). The pills were well known enough that Herman Melville mentioned them in Moby-Dick and Edgar Allan Poe devoted part of his story "Some Words with a Mummy" to a fanciful discussion of what their ingredients might be. P.T. Barnum gave Brandreth sardonic recognition in his book Humbugs of the World for his promotional skills. Back in Ossining, Brandreth helped establish two banks, and was on the founding board of Dale Cemetery, still the community's largest. If the company had wanted to expand during this period, the economic pressures of the Civil War prevented it from doing so.

Seven years after the end of the war, in 1872, a fire destroyed many of the buildings, including Brandreth's first manufacturing facility. The rebuilding put up most of the surviving buildings, as well as the more modern facility on an old mill site at the north end of the property: the current main building. Brandreth wanted to incorporate the newest technology into his new buildings, and so the storage facility midway between the two complexes was one of the first in Westchester to use corrugated iron while the main building had some of the first Otis elevators.

One morning in early 1880, Brandreth collapsed and died shortly after leaving his office. His son Franklin took over management. During the later years of the 19th century and the early 20th, the factory began to diversify its operations in response to increasing federal regulation of the patent-medicine industry. Among the new products were ammunition-box liners for the military during World War I.

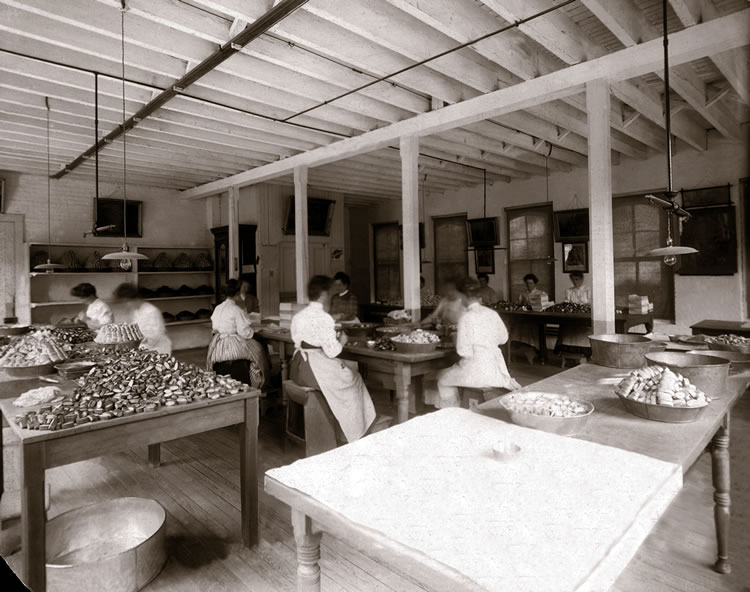
Women packing pills at factory, ca. 1900

Franklin Brandreth stepped down in 1928 and was replaced by his grandson Fox Brandreth Connor. By then the domestic market for the pills it had once manufactured in abundance was gone. Of the factory's earlier products, only porous plaster remained, and that was only made in winter. The company was making nail polish, mannequins, cell forms for bulletproof fuel tanks and the Havahart line of non-lethal animal traps.

=== 1940–2015: Use, disuse and demolition ===
In 1940 the company sold the buildings at the southern end of the property to the Gallowhur corporation, which used them to make insect repellent and suntan lotion. The rights to the pill formula were also sold off after World War II. Brandreth's company, under the Allcock name, continued its manufacturing operations in the 1870s complex until 1979. They were later used by the Filex Corporation, a maker of steel office furniture.

Eventually they became vacant again. In the 2000s a local developer, Plateau Associates, proposed the Hidden Cove on the Hudson project for the main building area. A total of 132 new housing units, planned as condominiums of a mix of prices, would be created, 28 of which would be in the main building. Plateau hoped to obtain Leadership in Energy and Environmental Design (LEED) certification for the completed units.

Plans apparently stalled after Plateau submitted its draft environmental impact statement (EIS) in 2008. At that time it also secured a demolition permit, but did not use it as other options were explored. In 2011 it prepared to submit a final EIS, with Hidden Cove now, in the wake of the Great Recession, changed to luxury rental units.

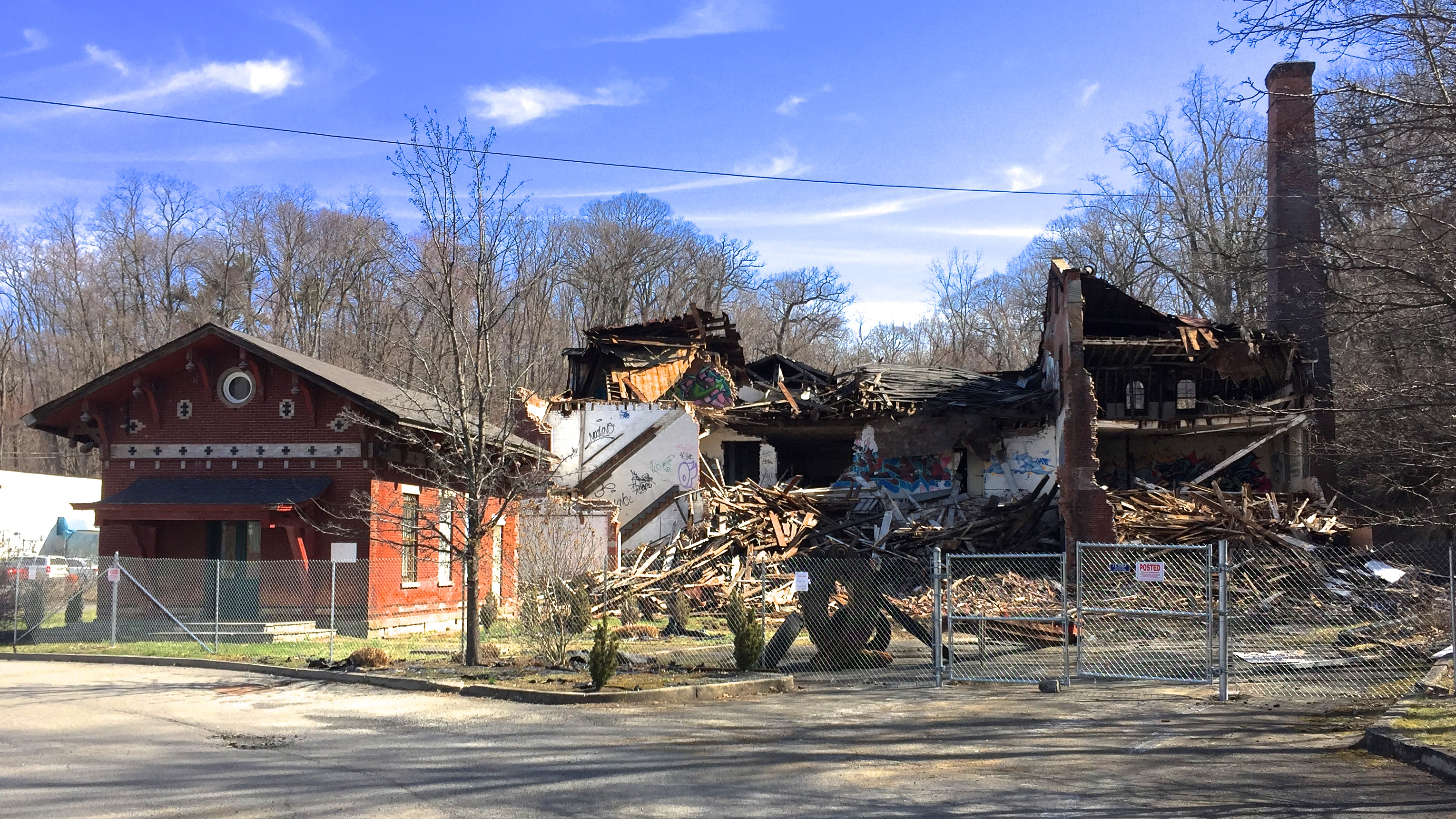
The building after Plateau Associates began demolishing it in April 2015

However, in 2007, the Federal Emergency Management Agency (FEMA) had issued updated flood plain maps for the Hudson River. They showed that the property would be under two feet (61 cm) of water in a hundred-year storm. By late 2012 that probability had been demonstrated by flooding after three tropical storms—Irene, Lee and Sandy—had struck the region. The last of those storms had, in fact, flooded the factory area up to four feet (120 cm). In the wake of Sandy, FEMA issued new maps.

Before Sandy, the already-deteriorated building's ground floor would have to be raised at least two feet, making it impossible to put any residential units on it. Afterwards, that would likely have been increased to six feet (180 cm) "We were thinking about adaptive reuse of the mill," said Peter Stolatis of Plateau. "The new floodplain plan puts an end to that." Plans to demolish the building were accelerated by village officials' insistence that the project be limited to just one building rather than several, he added.

Shortly afterward, the village's Historic Preservation Commission gave the building local landmark status. This meant that the building could not be demolished without its official permission. But in April 2015 Plateau Associates, the owner, began demolishing the building. While the company had been issued a demolition permit in 2008, Village manager Christine Papes said it had expired, and Plateau had not cleared its action with the village's Historic Preservation Commission, either. Plateau's lawyer claimed it had met all the village's requirements and not heard back from the village, so it proceeded with the demolition.

== See also ==
- National Register of Historic Places listings in northern Westchester County, New York
