= Calvin Pollard =

American architect

Calvin Pollard (June 14, 1797 - 1850) was a New York City architect. He is known for his early design of the Brooklyn Borough Hall, the Petersburg courthouse, and numerous other schools and houses in the New York City area.

== Life and career ==
Pollard was born in New Braintree, Massachusetts, the child of John Pollard and Kezia Heyward. His family moved to Cazenovia, New York, in 1803 before moving to New York City in 1818.

Pollard designed the St. Paul's Episcopal Church and Rectory at Ossining, New York, in 1834, now Calvary Baptist Church. In that same year, he won the contest to design the City Hall for Brooklyn. Construction began in 1836, but only the foundation had been laid when funds ran out. Nine years later, Gamaliel Kings revised Pollard’s plans and construction resumed, finally completing in 1848.

In 1836, Pollard built the Brandreth Pill Factory in Ossining, listed on the National Register of Historic Places in 1980. The Petersburg Courthouse in Petersburg, Virginia built between 1838 and 1840 is a Classical revival courthouse. It was part of the Siege of Petersburg during the Civil War. It was listed on the National Register of Historic Places in 1973. In 1837 he designed the Olympic Theatre on Broadway.
