= Calvary Baptist Church (Ossining, New York) =

Historic church in New York, United States

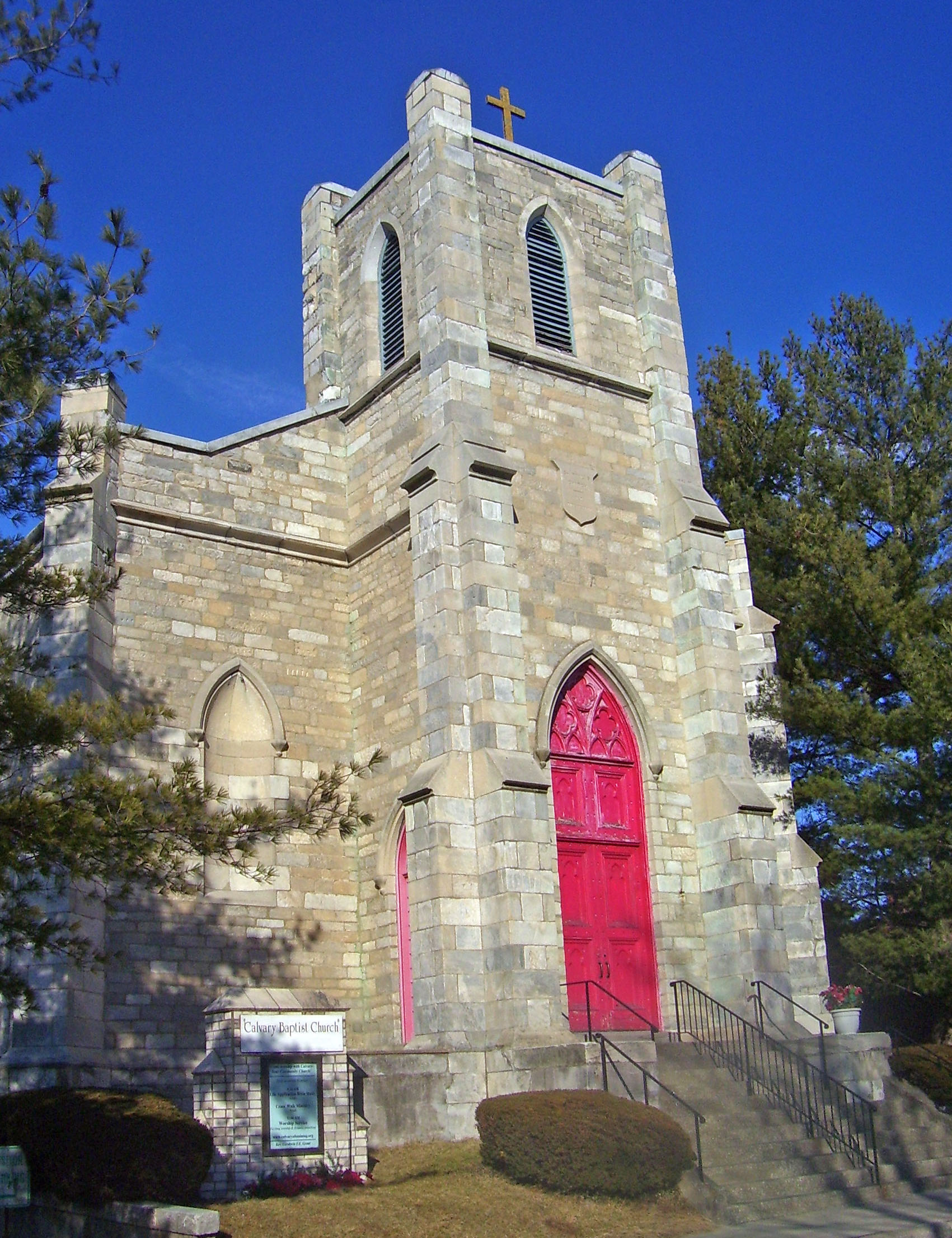
- South elevation, 2009

Religion
- Affiliation: Baptist
- Leadership: The Rev. Gershwin F.E. Grant, pastor

Location
- Location: Ossining, NY, USA
- Interactive map of Calvary Baptist Church
- Coordinates: 41°9′35″N 73°51′51″W

Architecture
- Architect: Calvin Pollard
- Style: Gothic Revival
- General contractor: Ledyard H. Halsey
- Completed: 1835

Specifications
- Direction of façade: South
- Materials: Marble

U.S. National Register of Historic Places
- Added to NRHP: December 6, 1978
- NRHP Reference no.: 78001925

Website
- Calvary

Calvary Baptist Church, originally St. Paul's Episcopal Church, is located on St. Paul's Place in Ossining, New York, United States. It is a stone building in the Gothic Revival architectural style, considered the best preserved early example of that style in Westchester County. It is also one of the few remaining Calvin Pollard buildings in the state. Built in the 1830s, it is the oldest house of worship in the village. In 1978 it and its rectory across the street were added to the National Register of Historic Places.

The original marble used for the church was quarried by inmates at nearby Sing Sing Prison. In the middle of the 19th century the rectory was added, across the street, and the church expanded. One of those architectural additions, a spire was removed in the mid-20th century. Shortly thereafter, the original Episcopal congregation moved out and sold the building to the new Calvary Baptist Church, which has occupied it ever since.

== Buildings ==
The church and rectory (now used as an annex) are on, respectively, the north and south sides of St. Paul's Place between State and Spring streets in downtown Ossining. Ossining's late-20th-century post office is to the northwest; across from it are the buildings of the Main Street crescent in the Downtown Ossining Historic District. There is a large building to the east of the church; otherwise, the only immediate neighbors are parking lots as the downtown area gives way to residential neighborhoods in all directions other than north. The land slopes gently down towards the steep bluff overlooking the Hudson River to the west.

The main building itself is a one-story three-by-four-bay structure faced in rough-cut Sing Sing marble with smooth stone used for trim. A square bell tower rises from the south (front) end. On the north is a small brick chancel with a brick chimney on the west; a small concrete block shed is attached to the east wall.

Every corner of the facades is buttressed. The south features blank label-molded pointed arched niches on either side of the tower. On either side of the nave are three pointed-arched stained-glass windows with simple tracery; above double-hung windows with diamond-shaped mullions. In the rear of the chancel is a single large Tudor arched stained-glass window with two narrow sash windows on the east; above it the main block has a small round oculus. On the inside the church has exposed wooden roof trusses, the stained glass windows, and a large pointed chancel arch.

Stone steps with metal railings rise to the tower, with entrances on all three sides. All are double wooden doors in blind pointed arches with decorative woodwork paneled transoms. The east and west entrance rise to the same level as the tower's lowest buttress; the south entrance reaches the same level as the flanking niches. From the lower buttress another buttress rises to a level parallel with a cornice at the roofline on the side faces. The cornice does not continue onto the south facer of the tower; it is replaced by a centrally located shield-shaped stone commemorative plaque reading "St. Paul's Church, A.D. MDCCCXXXV". Above it is another cornice at the top of the roof, setting off a final stage with a narrow pointed-arch louvered vent in the center of each face. A small cross tops the tower.

The rectory across the street is a two-and-a-half-story three-bay brick residence with a one-and-a-half-story wing projecting from the south and a one-story center-gabled porch across the north (front) elevation. It has Gothic detailing similar to that on the church, in particular two-over-two double-hung sash pointed-arched windows. The gabled roof is set off by a simple frieze. Inside it has the original staircase, and intact decorative ceilings and door and window surrounds.

== History ==
In the 1830s Ossining, then known as Sing Sing, was at its pre-industrial peak. The Croton Turnpike (now New York State Route 133) brought the produce of inland farms to the port along the Hudson River where they could be shipped to New York City and other large markets. Around the docks were shipbuilders and related industries. Inmates at Sing Sing prison, established in 1825, quarried marble for use in local buildings, among other such operations.

A growing Episcopal congregation decided it needed its own church. In 1834 it obtained the lot for $800 ($25,000 in modern dollars) from Richard Austin, a wealthy local lawyer whose house, also listed on the National Register, is today a local history museum. For the design, it commissioned Calvin Pollard, a New York City architect who had recently won the design contest for Brooklyn Borough Hall (for which only his foundation was ultimately used), who produced a design in the new Gothic Revival style that used Sing Sing marble. In 1835 it was completed and opened.

It grew with the village as the railroad came to the waterfront and industrialized it. In 1859 the chancel was added to the rear. The rectory across the street, added in 1864, was designed to be architecturally sympathetic with the church it faced. In 1870 a spire was added to the top of the bell tower.

Weather damaged it in 1951, and it was removed. Shortly afterwards the Episcopalians, reflecting the suburbanization of Ossining, moved to a new church on Ganung Drive in the surrounding Town of Ossining and became St. Paul's on the Hill. Calvary bought the vacant church in 1958 and has remained there.

== See also ==
- National Register of Historic Places listings in northern Westchester County, New York
