= Washington School (Ossining, New York) =

- U.S. National Register of Historic Places
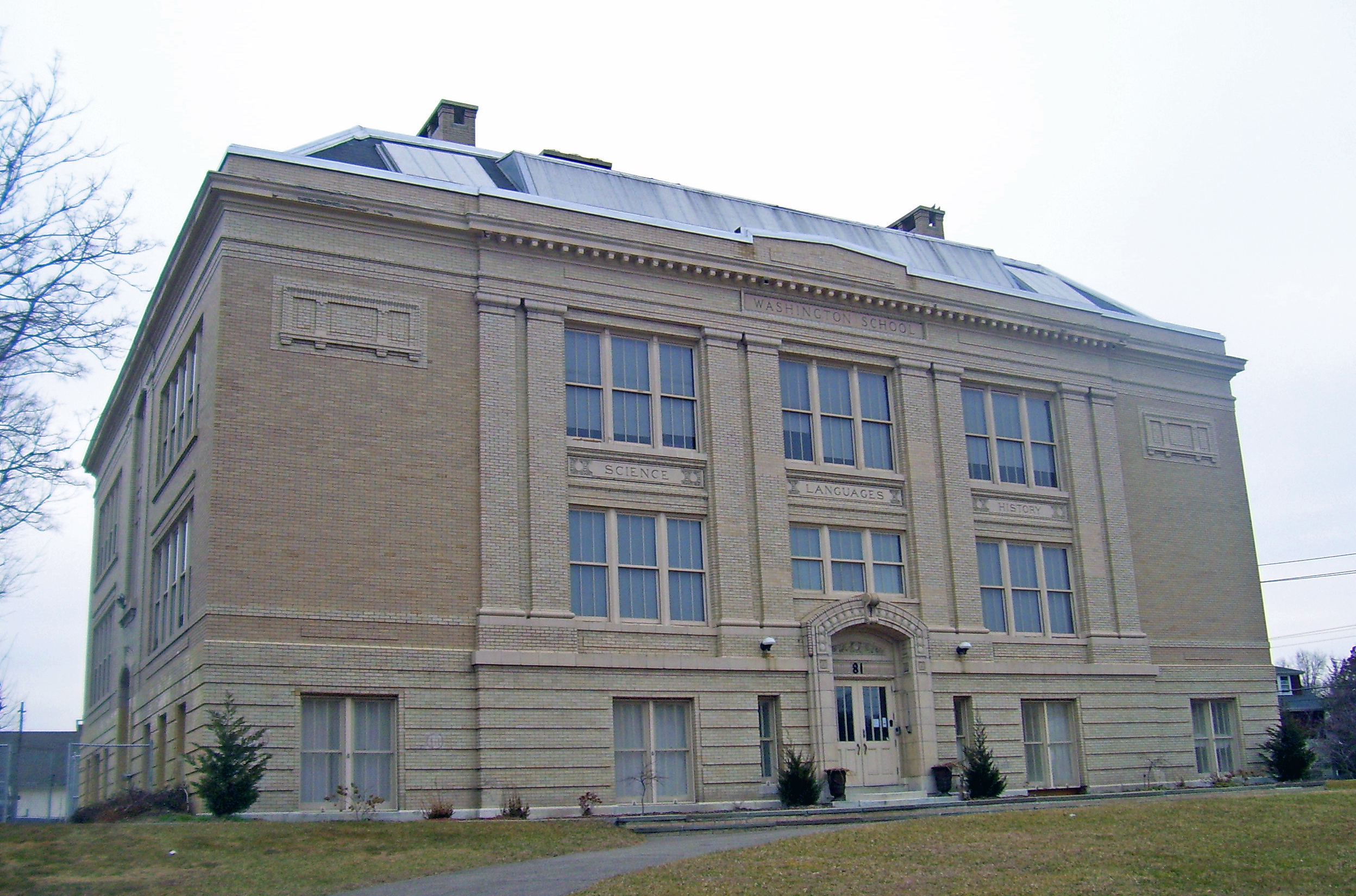
- West profile and south elevation, 2009

- Location within New York Location within the United States
- Location: Ossining, NY
- Nearest city: White Plains
- Coordinates: 41°9′56″N 73°51′30″W
- Area: 1 acre (4,000 m^{2})
- Built: 1907
- Built by: John V. Schaefer
- Architect: Wilson Potter
- Architectural style: Beaux Arts
- NRHP reference No.: 87000080
- Added to NRHP: February 12, 1901

The former Washington School is located on Croton Avenue (New York State Route 133) in the village of Ossining, New York, United States. It was built in 1907 in the Beaux-Arts style, one of two in the village to use it. It was added to the National Register of Historic Places in 1987.

It was built as a high school, in response to the village's rapid growth following industrialization in the early 20th century, from a design by Wilson Potter of New York City, an architect who specialized in schools. It includes what were at the time some of the most progressive and advanced features of school buildings. Its early (for a school) use of the Beaux-Arts style and placement on a rise in the land give it a monumental quality despite its relatively small size.

It is no longer used as a school, and has been turned over to the village for reuse. For a time it housed a museum established by the local historical society. In 1973 it was closed by the school district as part of desegregation efforts. Since a 2009 renovation it has been home to the House of Refuge Apostolic Faith Church. It remains largely as it was originally built, with few alterations.

== Building ==
The school building is located on a one-acre (4,000 m^{2}) lot the north side of Croton, a quarter-mile (500 m) northeast of where it forks off from Highland Avenue (U.S. Route 9) in downtown Ossining. It is just west of Todd Place, and the intersection where Dale Avenue (New York State Route 134) forks off to the northeast. Across the street are some commercial buildings and a parking lot; to the south there is a high-rise apartment complex. The neighborhood is otherwise residential, composed of two-story wooden frame houses built later in the 20th century. The land under the school rises slightly, reflecting the gorge of Sing Sing Kill, a tributary of the Hudson River, just to its northwest.

A circular walkway connects the building to Croton Avenue. There is a flagpole in the center. Both are considered contributing resources to the National Register listing.

=== Exterior ===
The building itself is a T-shaped two-story load-bearing brick structure on a raised basement topped by a partly hipped roof pierced by three brick ventilation stacks and one brick chimney, all near the corners. Its facades are trimmed with terra cotta. The middle of the east (front) face projects slightly. A one-story auditorium wing projects from the west.

The basement's brick is laid in rusticated bands. In the middle is the recessed main entrance, with double wooden doors in a classically detailed segmental-arched surround and narrow one-over-one double-hung sash windows on either side. It has four bays set with double three-over-three double-hung sash elsewhere on the facade.

On the second and third stories of the projecting middle section, the three bays are set with triple three-over-three double-hung sash. Paired pilasters running up both stories separate them vertically; between the two stories are recessed terra-cotta spandrels inscribed with "SCIENCE", "LANGUAGE" and "HISTORY." At the top is a wide frieze, then a wider terra cotta entablature with "WASHINGTON SCHOOL" inscribed in a central tablet. Outside the central section, the only decoration is rectangular molded brick tablets on the third story.

The two side facades have a largely similar treatment. The rustication and entablature along the basement are continued. Their entrances have a similar surround, but are topped with a recessed two-story segmental arch with windows that light the staircase behind them. On either side are three two-over-two double-hung sash at the basement level and groups of five two-over-two double-hung sash on the second and third stories.

The four-by-four-bay auditorium wing also sits on a raised basement. It lacks terra cotta but is otherwise similar in materials and decorative treatment to the main block. The auditorium section has large tripartite windows with transoms, giving way to six-over-six double-hung sash backstage. In one window bay on each side are exit doors, with steel platforms and stairs. Below, on the basement, are paired two-over-two double-hung sash. The wing has a flat roof.

A cornice, modillioned above the central main facade, marks the roofline. Above it is a parapet wall. The roof is surfaced in slate sections broken by banks of skylights. In the center it is flat, with a larger skylight superstructure.

=== Interior ===
At all the main entrances a vestibule leads to steps up to the second story. The building's interior floor plan, with 34,000 square feet (3,200 m^{2}) of space, remains unaltered. Two central corridors on either side cross the building, with the east-west one providing access to the stairs at either end.

The boiler room is located at the western corner of the basement. The second story has a library and office suite in the southeast corner and large classrooms in the others. The auditorium begins within the main block and extends into the west wing. Above it the third story has smaller classrooms. The skylights on the attic level illuminate laboratory rooms. In the center is an open rectangular room with a coffered skylight.

Many of the original finishes remain. The corridors are floored in hardwood, although they have been replaced by plywood and carpeting in the classrooms. The plaster walls and ceilings, ceramic-tile wainscoting and woodworking are all original. Some modern features, like fluorescent lights and wire glass doors to the stairwells, have been added. The auditorium has its original fold-down wooden chairs and ceiling skylight with a stained glass emblem in the center depicting a ship with sails and the legend "Embark on a voyage of knowledge."

== History ==
Originally known as Sing Sing, Ossining first prospered in the 18th and early 19th centuries as one of many farm communities shipping produce to New York City via sloops on the Hudson River, benefiting from the village's location at a crossroads with a turnpike connecting it to farms further inland, corresponding to the current intersection of Croton and Highland avenues. The construction of one of New York's first prisons near the port in the 1820s spurred some additional development, and when the Hudson River Railroad was built in the middle of the century industrialization soon followed. By the beginning of the 20th century, when Ossining changed to its current name to distance itself from the prison, its population had multiplied considerably from a century before.

The village's older system of small wooden schoolhouses was no longer adequate to educate its children to the level society desired, and Washington was commissioned as its first modern school. Architect Wilson Potter, of New York City, specialized in school buildings. He included a number of modern features that had already become standard on other institutional buildings of the era, such as large windows to let in natural light, partially enclosed steel stairways to provide better fire safety, and central heating.

Potter used the Beaux-Arts style that had become popular over the preceding decades, particularly for public buildings. Only one other building in the village, the Bank for Savings, a contributing property to the Downtown Ossining Historic District built the year after the school, would use it. The school is a particular strong example of the style, with its axial symmetry, advancing and retreating wall planes and classical detailing. Despite the building's relatively small size, it achieves the monumental presence characteristic of Beaux-Arts buildings through an exaggerated sense of its height conveyed the combination of its siting on a low rise and its hipped roof and chimneys.

The new school served the community and the school district for a quarter-century before continuing growth fueled by suburbanization exceeded its capacity. In 1929 the district built the current Ossining High School downtown, on Highland Avenue. It was converted to an elementary school. The Ossining Historical Society, founded two years later, would be housed in the school for over three decades.

Ossining continued to grow, adding another four elementary schools over the next several decades. As the school district's reach extended beyond the town and village of Ossining to neighboring New Castle, racial disparities became evident. Since most of the district's minority population lived in Ossining, their children were concentrated at Washington.

In 1968 a state commission identified Ossining as one of the 54 most segregated districts in the state. Since the five elementary schools fed into a single middle and high school, racial tensions sometimes flared into riots that spilled off school grounds into the village's downtown business district. To remedy that, the school board voted to close Washington and implement busing to even the racial balance at the other schools.

The historical society moved to the Richard Austin House, further east along Croton, in 1968. Washington, already showing signs of physical decline, was closed in 1973. The district continued to use it for offices for another eight years, after which it was rented out to private parties.

In 2006 Joan Whittaker, pastor of the growing House of Refuge Apostolic Faith Church, which had worshipped at several other locations around Ossining, saw the building as a likely future location. She persisted despite being told it was not for sale, and eventually purchased it. After extensive renovations, it opened for services in 2009.

== See also ==
- National Register of Historic Places listings in northern Westchester County, New York
