= Petersburg Courthouse Historic District =

Historic district in Virginia, United States

- U.S. National Register of Historic Places
- U.S. Historic district
- Virginia Landmarks Register
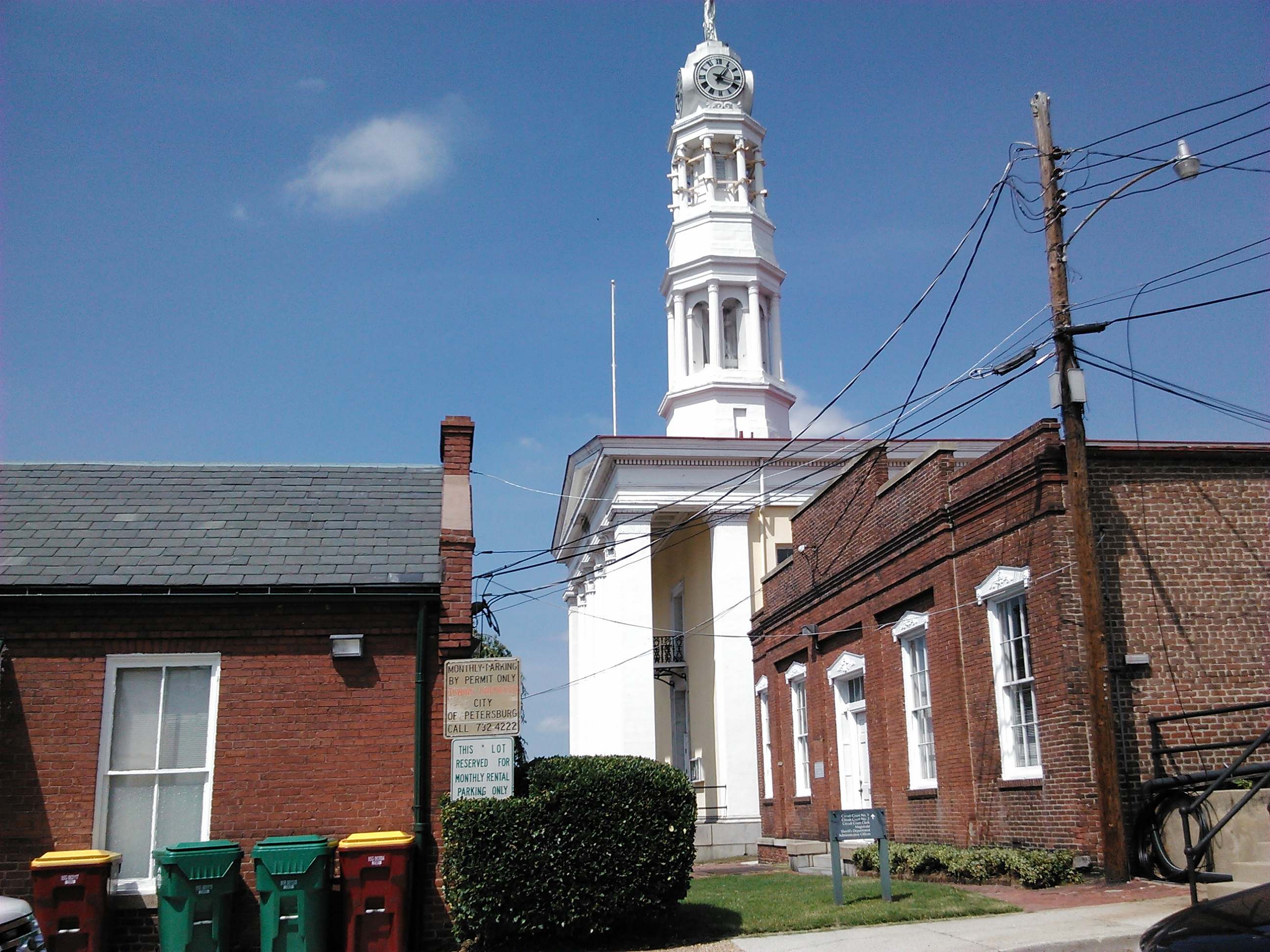
- Petersburg Courthouse Historic District, view of sheriff's office and Petersburg Courthouse

- Location within Virginia Location within the United States
- Location: Roughly bounded by W. Bank, N. Adams, W. Washington and N. Market Sts., Petersburg, Virginia
- Coordinates: 37°13′45″N 77°24′20″W
- Area: 36.2 acres (14.6 ha)
- Architect: Walter, Thomas U.; Et al.
- Architectural style: Greek Revival, Italianate, Federal
- NRHP reference No.: 90001572
- VLR No.: 123-0103

Significant dates
- Added to NRHP: December 21, 1990
- Designated VLR: August 21, 1990

Petersburg Courthouse Historic District is a national historic district located at Petersburg, Virginia. The district includes 75 contributing buildings located in the central business district of Petersburg. It is centered on the Petersburg Courthouse and includes notable examples of Greek Revival, Italianate, Federal style architecture. Notable buildings include the Paul-Lassiter House, Slaughter-Tatum House, Tabb Street Presbyterian Church Rectory, Mark E. Holt Jewelry Store, Augustus Wright Block, Virginia National Bank, Saal's Department Store, Remmie Arnold Pens Company building, A&P Super Market, Watson Court Apartments, and the Zimmer & Company Building. Located in the district and separately listed are the Petersburg City Hall, Tabb Street Presbyterian Church, and Saint Paul's Church.

It was listed on the National Register of Historic Places in 1990.
