= Petersburg Courthouse =

- U.S. National Register of Historic Places
- U.S. Historic district – Contributing property
- Virginia Landmarks Register
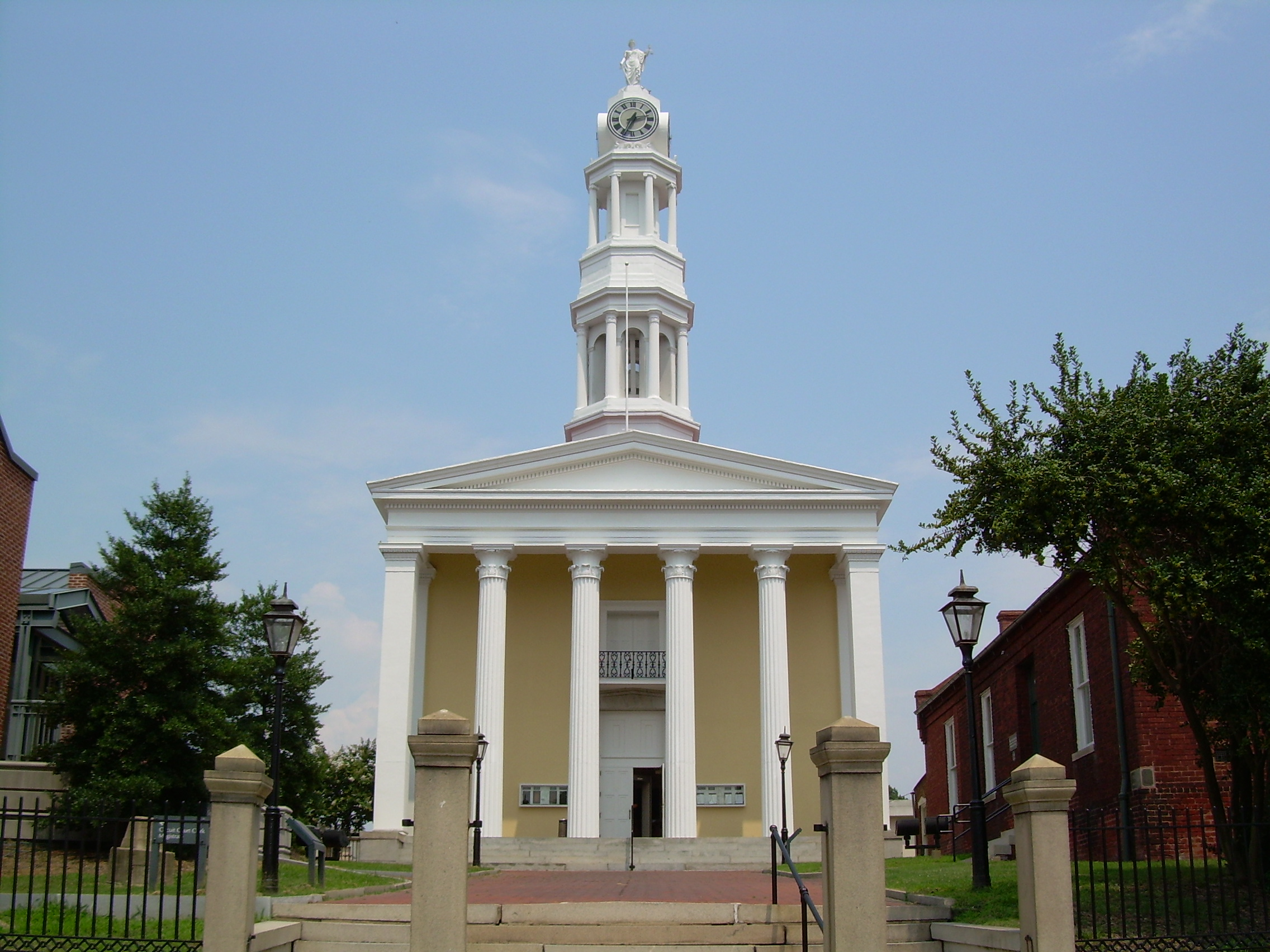
- Petersburg Courthouse, July 2006

- Location within Virginia Location within the United States
- Interactive map showing the location of Petersburg County Courthouse
- Location: Court House Sq., Petersburg, Virginia
- Coordinates: 37°13′50″N 77°24′12″W
- Area: 9 acres (3.6 ha)
- Built: 1838
- Architect: Pollard, Calvin
- Architectural style: Mid 19th Century Revival, Classical Revival
- NRHP reference No.: 73002218
- VLR No.: 123-0045

Significant dates
- Added to NRHP: May 14, 1973
- Designated VLR: April 17, 1973

Petersburg Courthouse is a historic courthouse building located at Petersburg, Virginia. It was designed by New York architect Calvin Pollard and built between 1838 and 1840. It is a two-story, Classical Revival style brick building. It rests on a granite foundation and measures 57 feet wide and 93 feet deep. It features a pedimented hexastyle front portico and a double-tiered bell and clock tower modeled after the Choragic Monument of Lysicrates in Athens. Major work was performed on the structure until 1877 when extensive repairs and interior alterations were carried out. A 30-foot addition was constructed in 1965. During the Siege of Petersburg, Union troops used the tower for a sighting mark and spared the structure from the bombardment.

It was listed on the National Register of Historic Places in 1973. It is located in the Petersburg Courthouse Historic District.
