= Saint Paul's Church (Petersburg, Virginia) =

Historic church in Virginia, United States

- U.S. National Register of Historic Places
- U.S. Historic district – Contributing property
- Virginia Landmarks Register
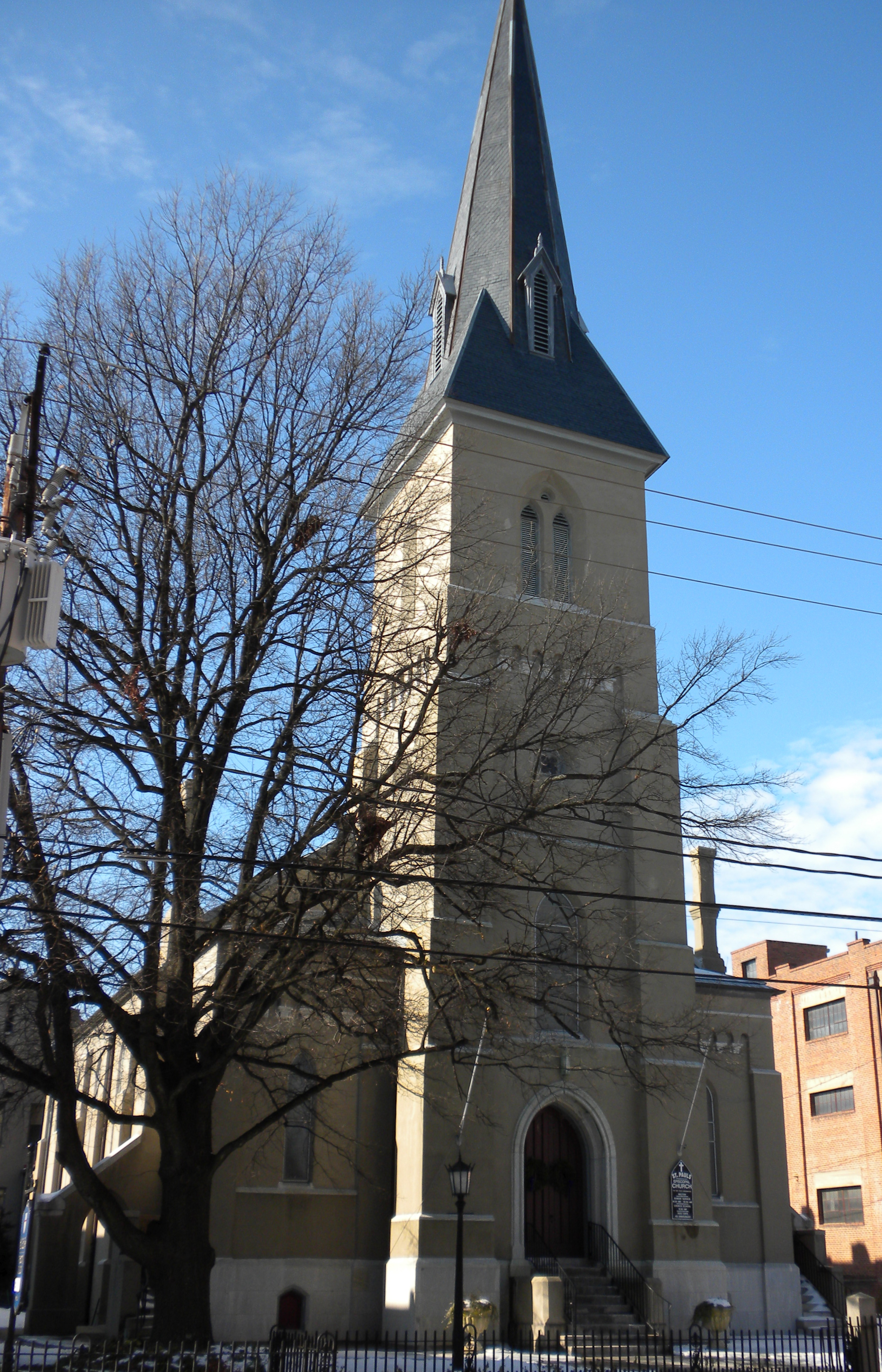

- Location within Virginia Location within the United States
- Location: 102 N. Union St., Petersburg, Virginia
- Coordinates: 37°13′43″N 77°24′22″W
- Area: 1.3 acres (0.53 ha)
- Built: 1855-1857
- Architect: Niernsee & Neilson
- Architectural style: Gothic Revival
- NRHP reference No.: 86001191
- VLR No.: 123-0041

Significant dates
- Added to NRHP: May 30, 1986
- Designated VLR: April 15, 1986

The Saint Paul's Church also known as Saint Paul's Protestant Episcopal Church, is a historic Episcopal church in Petersburg, Virginia, United States. It was designed by Niernsee & Neilson and built between 1855 and 1857, in the Gothic Revival style. The church is constructed of brick and features a three-story entrance tower. Also on the property are a contributing rectory (c. 1860) and parish house (1922). The church was attended by Robert E. Lee during the Siege of Petersburg in 1864–65.

It was listed on the National Register of Historic Places in 1986. It is located in the Petersburg Courthouse Historic District.
