= Sassinoro =

- Comune
- Comune di Sassinoro
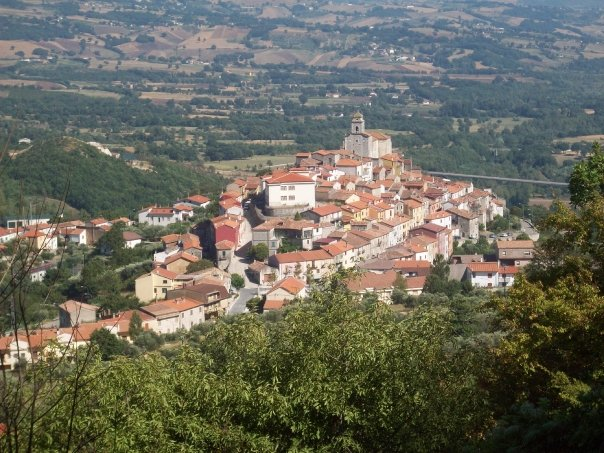

- Location within Italy Location within Campania
- Coordinates: 41°22′N 14°40′E
- Country: Italy
- Region: Campania
- Province: Benevento (BN)

Government
  - Mayor: Pasqualino Cusano

Area
  - Total: 13.25 km^{2} (5.12 sq mi)
- Elevation: 545 m (1,788 ft)

Population (31 December 2010)
  - Total: 595
  - Density: 44.9/km^{2} (116/sq mi)
- Demonym: Sassinoresi
- Time zone: UTC+1 (CET)
  - Summer (DST): UTC+2 (CEST)
- Postal code: 82020
- Dialing code: 0824
- Website: Official website

Sassinoro is a comune (municipality) in the Province of Benevento in the Italian region Campania, located about 70 km (43 mi) northeast of Naples and about 30 km (19 mi) northwest of Benevento.

Sassinoro borders the following municipalities: Morcone, Sepino.

== Twin towns ==
- Ossining, United States
