= Petersburg City Hall =

- U.S. National Register of Historic Places
- U.S. Historic district – Contributing property
- Virginia Landmarks Register
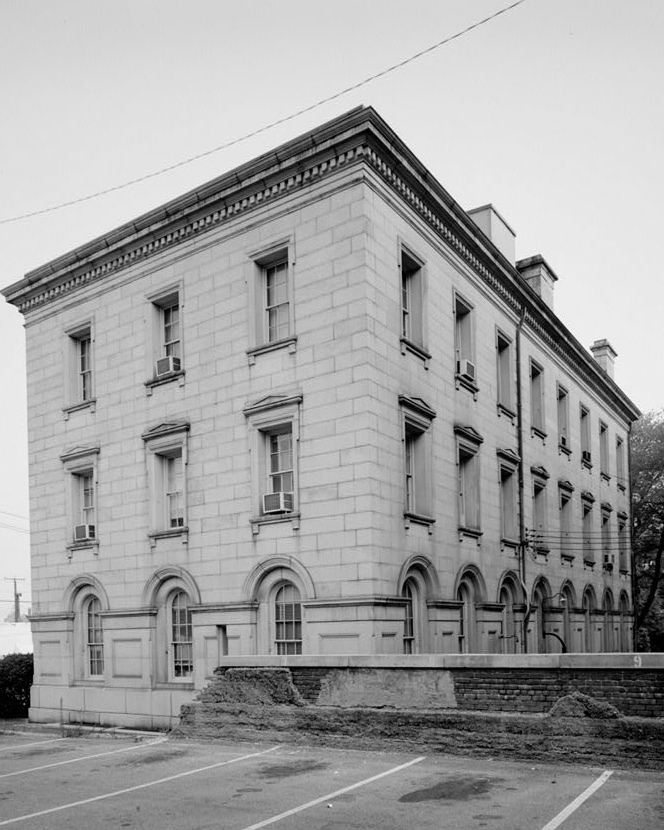
- Petersburg City Hall, HABS Photo, Summer 1981

- Location within Virginia Location within the United States
- Location: 135 N. Union St., Petersburg, Virginia
- Coordinates: 37°13′47″N 77°24′19″W
- Area: less than one acre
- Built: 1856-1859, 1908-1910
- Architect: Ammi B. Young
- Architectural style: Renaissance, Italian Renaissance Revival
- NRHP reference No.: 78003185
- VLR No.: 123-0035

Significant dates
- Added to NRHP: November 16, 1978
- Designated VLR: April 18, 1978

Petersburg City Hall is a historic city hall building located at Petersburg, Virginia. It was designed by architect Ammi B. Young and built between 1856 and 1859, as the U.S. Customs House and Post Office.

== Description ==
The Petersburg Custom House & Post Office is located on the southeast corner of Tabb and Union streets on a plot of ground purchased April 18, 1856, for the sum of $15,000. It is a three-story, three bay by eight bay, Italian Renaissance Revival style brick building faced in granite. It measures 46 feet wide and 100 feet deep and was expanded to its present size in 1908-1910.

The building was designed by Ammi B. Young, first Supervising Architect of the United States Treasury, in the Italian Renaissance style. Construction was commenced in 1856 and completed in 1859, the cost of construction being $84,664.88. It was first occupied, however, in September, 1858, while still in an unfinished condition.

The exterior walls are constructed of Petersburgh granite. The original design of the building was for two stories only, after the original construction work was commenced, a third story was added for the accommodation of the Custom House department, and was used as sleeping apartments for the Customs officers. This building did not have a federal courtroom, all judicial matters would be conducted at the Richmond federal courthouse, just 20 miles north of the city.

The roof was made entirely of iron beams, covered with corrugated galvanized sheeting. The three southern bays of the building were added between 1908 and 1910.

The layout of the interior rooms plan has changed several times, nowadays revealing little evidence of the original arrangement. The first floor is primarily a large open public area containing municipal service areas. The second and third floors are divided into city offices. The interior columns and staircases are original.

== Uses ==
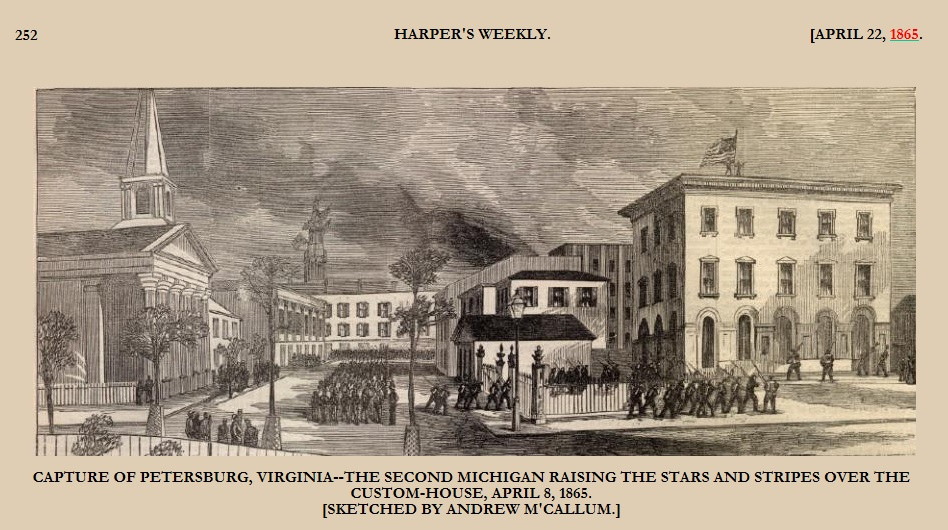
Sketch showing arrival of Union troops in Petersburg in April 1865, providing an incidental glimpse of the Custom House and Post Office. Harpers Weekly

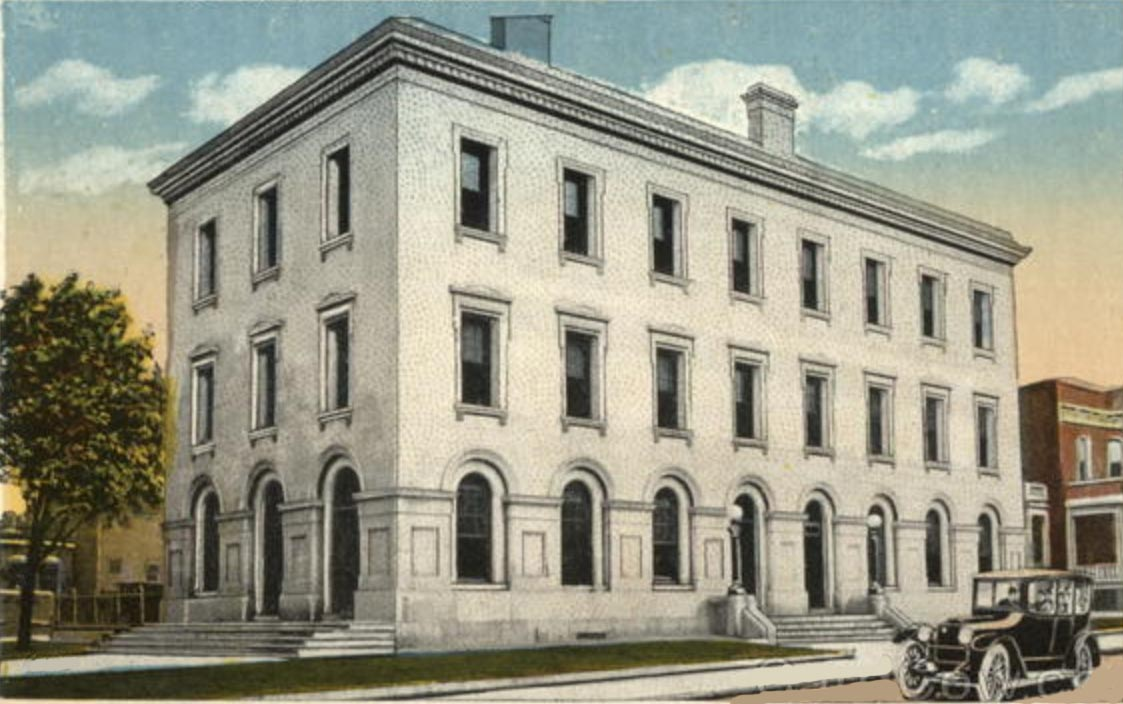
Postcard of Custom House & Post Office, 1900

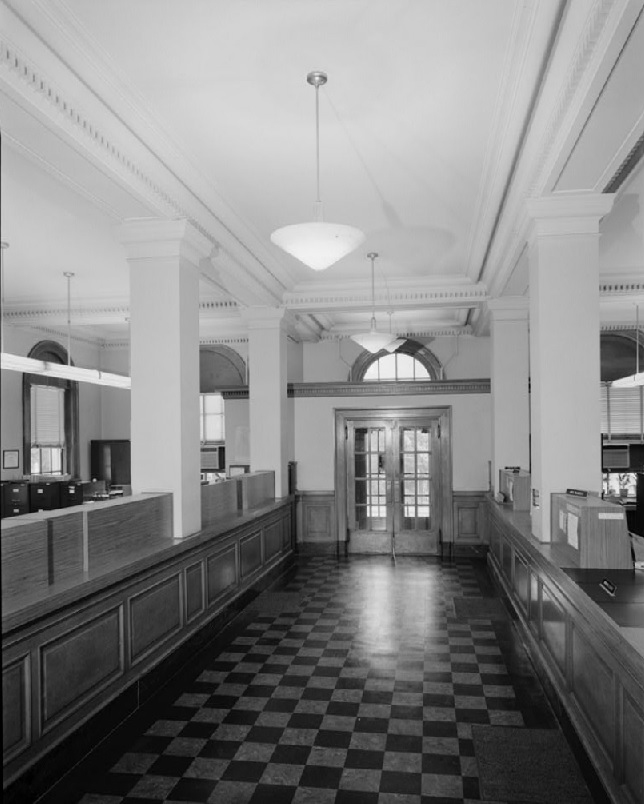
First floor interior of Custom House & Post Office, 1933

The building was primarily used as a post office and custom house, although the initial floor plan was changed several times.

During the American Civil War the building served as the headquarters of the Confederate Army.

The Post Office moved to a new location in 1936 and the building was renovated as part of a Works Progress Administration project, becoming the Petersburg's City Hall in 1938. It still retains that use as at 2017.

Located in the Petersburg Courthouse Historic District, the building was listed on the National Register of Historic Places in 1978.
