= Brooklyn Borough Hall =

Building in Brooklyn, New York

- U.S. National Register of Historic Places
- New York State Register of Historic Places
- New York City Landmark
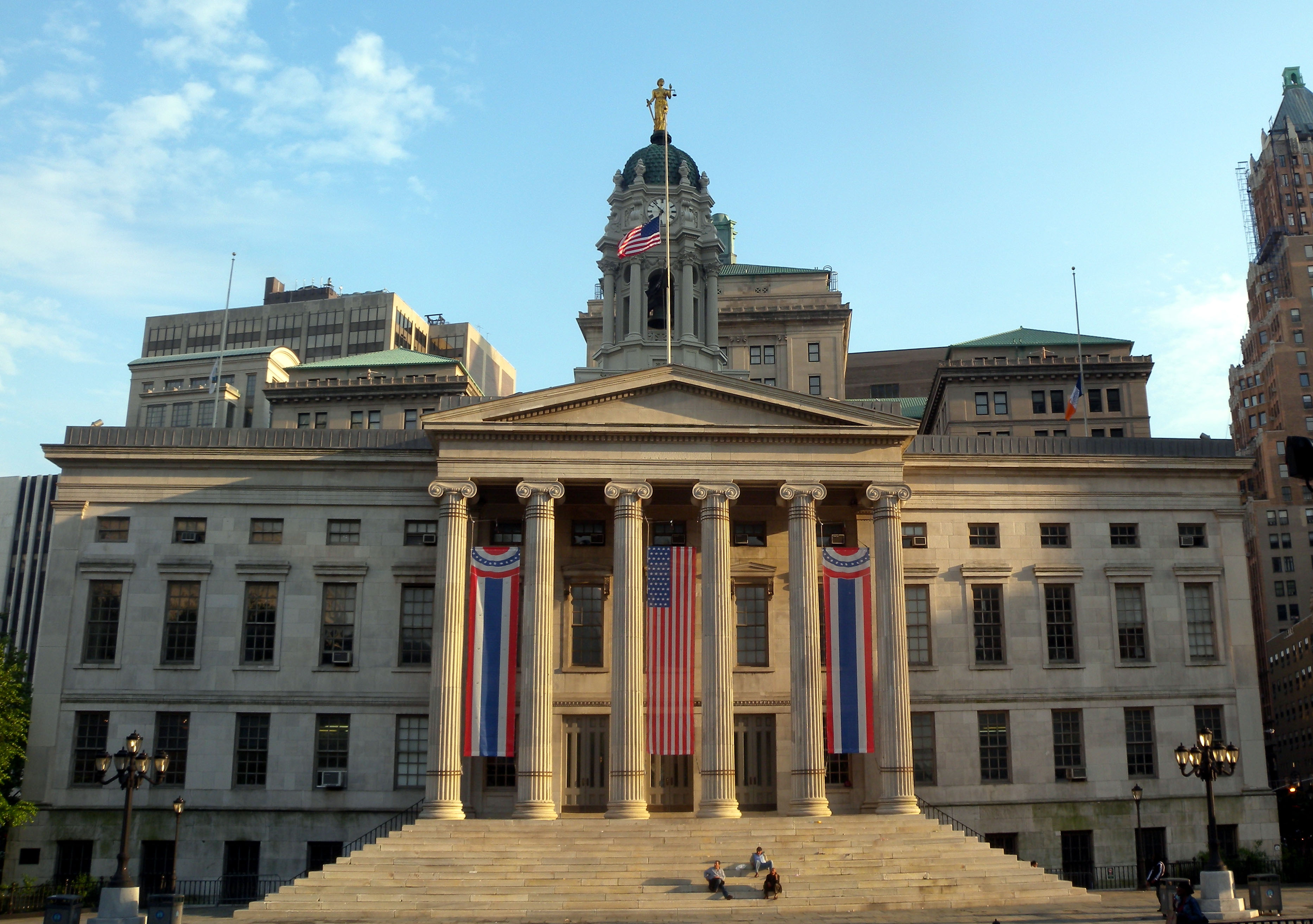
- (2009)
- Location: 209 Joralemon Street; Brooklyn, New York 11201
- Coordinates: 40°41′34″N 73°59′24″W
- Area: 1 acre (0.40 ha)
- Built: 1848
- Architects: Calvin Pollard; Gamaliel King
- Architectural style: Greek Revival
- NRHP reference No.: 80002630
- NYSRHP No.: 04701.000021
- NYCL No.: 0147

Significant dates
- Added to NRHP: January 10, 1980
- Designated NYSRHP: June 23, 1980
- Designated NYCL: April 19, 1966

Brooklyn Borough Hall is a building in Downtown Brooklyn, New York City. It was designed by architects Calvin Pollard and Gamaliel King in the Greek Revival style, and constructed of Tuckahoe marble under the supervision of superintendent Stephen Haynes.

It was completed in 1848 as the City Hall for the City of Brooklyn. In January 1898 the independent City of Brooklyn merged with the City of New York, and Kings County became the Borough of Brooklyn, at which time the building became Brooklyn Borough Hall.

== History ==
=== Construction ===
In 1834, the year Brooklyn was granted its city charter, the land for Brooklyn's city hall was donated by the Remsen and Pierrepont families, whose names are commemorated in the names of Remsen and Pierrepont Streets in nearby Brooklyn Heights. The following year, New York architect Calvin Pollard won the commission to design the building in a contest held by the city. The foundations were dug and the cornerstone laid for this structure in 1836. However, financial hardship halted construction entirely.

When funds again became available in 1845 construction resumed, this time of a structure designed by Gamaliel King, who had come in second to Pollard in the city's design competition, with instructions from the city that the new building must fit inside the already laid foundation. King preserved many elements of Pollard's original design and intent, including its Greek Revival style, although the project was scaled down in size somewhat. Construction was completed in 1848.

=== Usage ===
The Kings County Courthouse was built in 1868, turning this area – now known as Downtown Brooklyn – into a government center and busy area of commerce. In the 1940s, the Kings County Courthouse and other nearby buildings to the north were replaced by a complex of courthouses and a plaza in front of Borough Hall. A mall connects the building to Cadman Plaza Park.

On February 26, 1895, waste paper caught fire and destroyed the cupola and the statue of Justice that stood atop it, as well as the top floors of the building; water damage ruined the walls and ceiling of the Common Council chamber. Three years later, a new Victorian cast-iron cupola was built, designed by Vincent C. Griffith and the firm of Stoughton and Stoughton, on which was placed a flag. In 1898, the city of Brooklyn was consolidated into the five boroughs of New York City, and this building ceased being "City Hall" and became "Borough Hall". In 1902, the Common Council room was demolished to build a new courtroom, designed in the Beaux-Arts style by Brooklyn architect Axel Hedman.

Starting in the 1930s, there were numerous proposals to raze Borough Hall, based on arguments that it no longer performed any government function, that its architecture was not particularly notable, and that it was a monument to an extremely brief era in Brooklyn's history. In 1966, the building was designated a city landmark by the then-new New York City Landmarks Preservation Commission. The building was added to the National Register of Historic Places on January 10, 1980.

In the 1980s, the building underwent a massive renovation under the supervision of Conklin & Rossant. The original copper shingling on the cupola was restored by Les metalliers Champenois, the same metalworks involved in the restoration of the Statue of Liberty, and the flag on the cupola was replaced by a new figure of Lady Justice. The renovation was completed in 1989. In the mid-2010s, the plaza became a popular skate spot after a restoration.

== Gallery ==
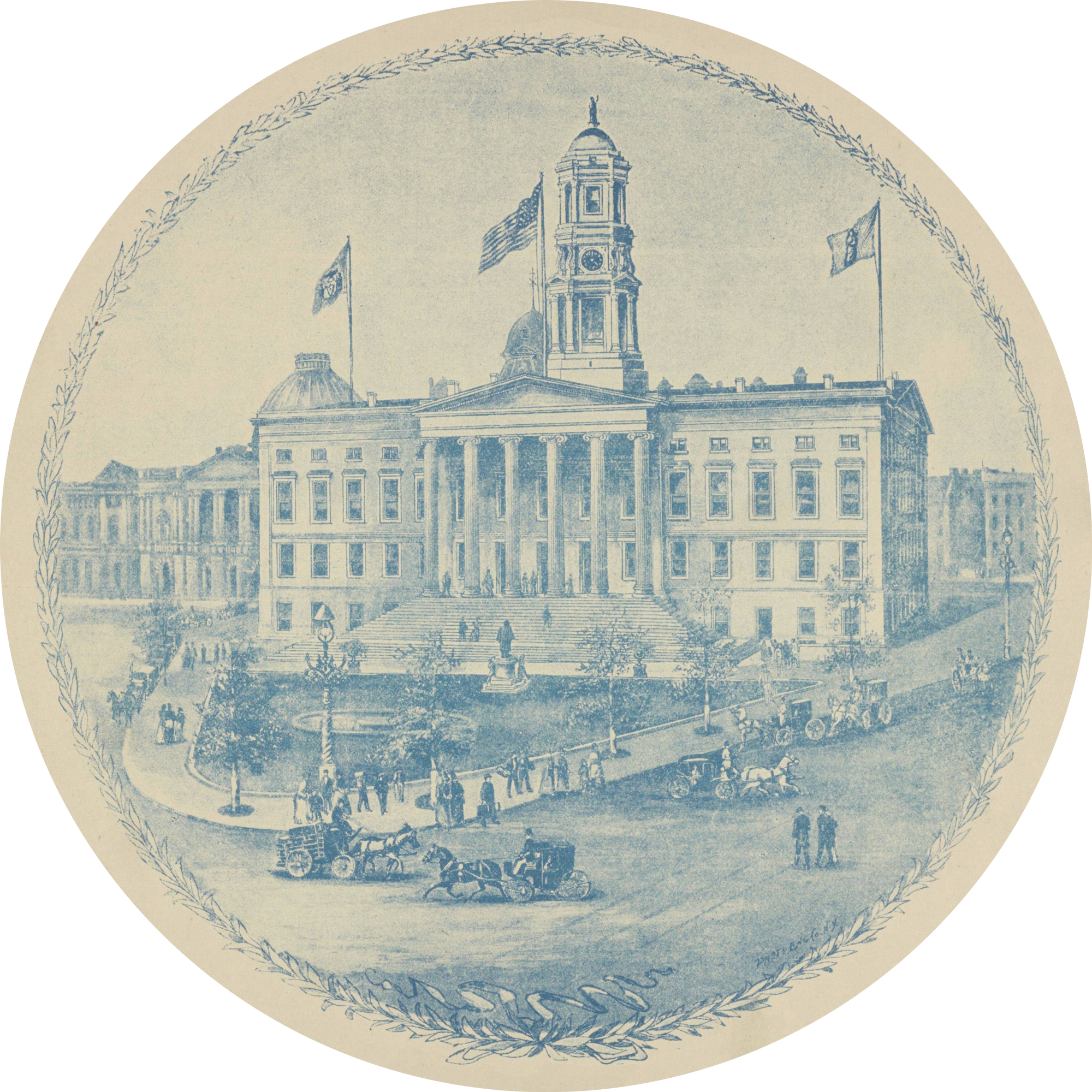
1895 engraving of then-Brooklyn City Hall

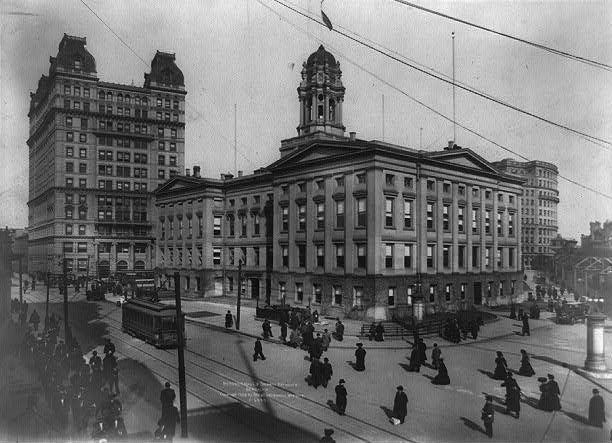
Photograph, c. 1908, Historic American Buildings Survey archive

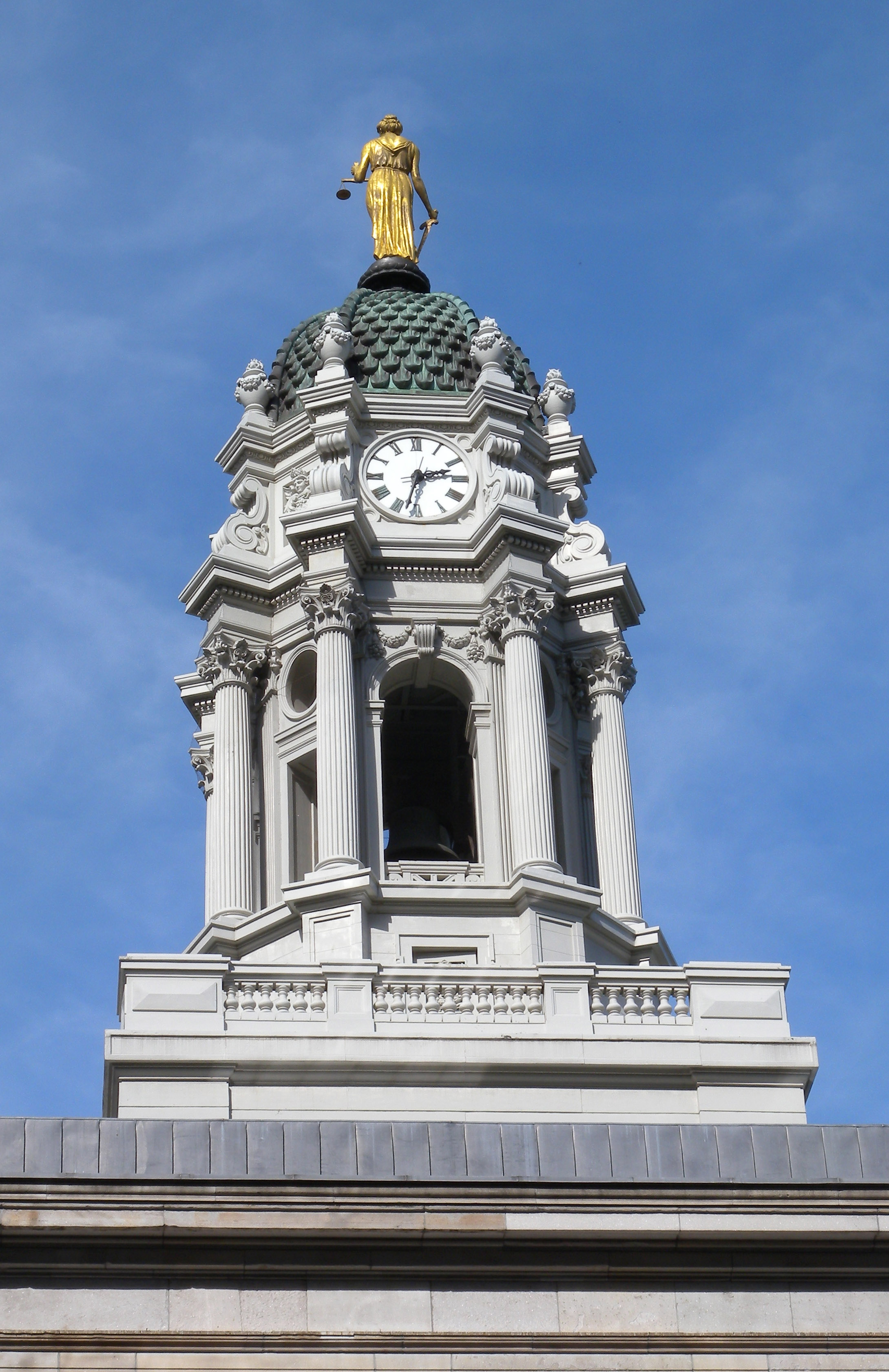
The cupola and Statue of Justice, from the rear

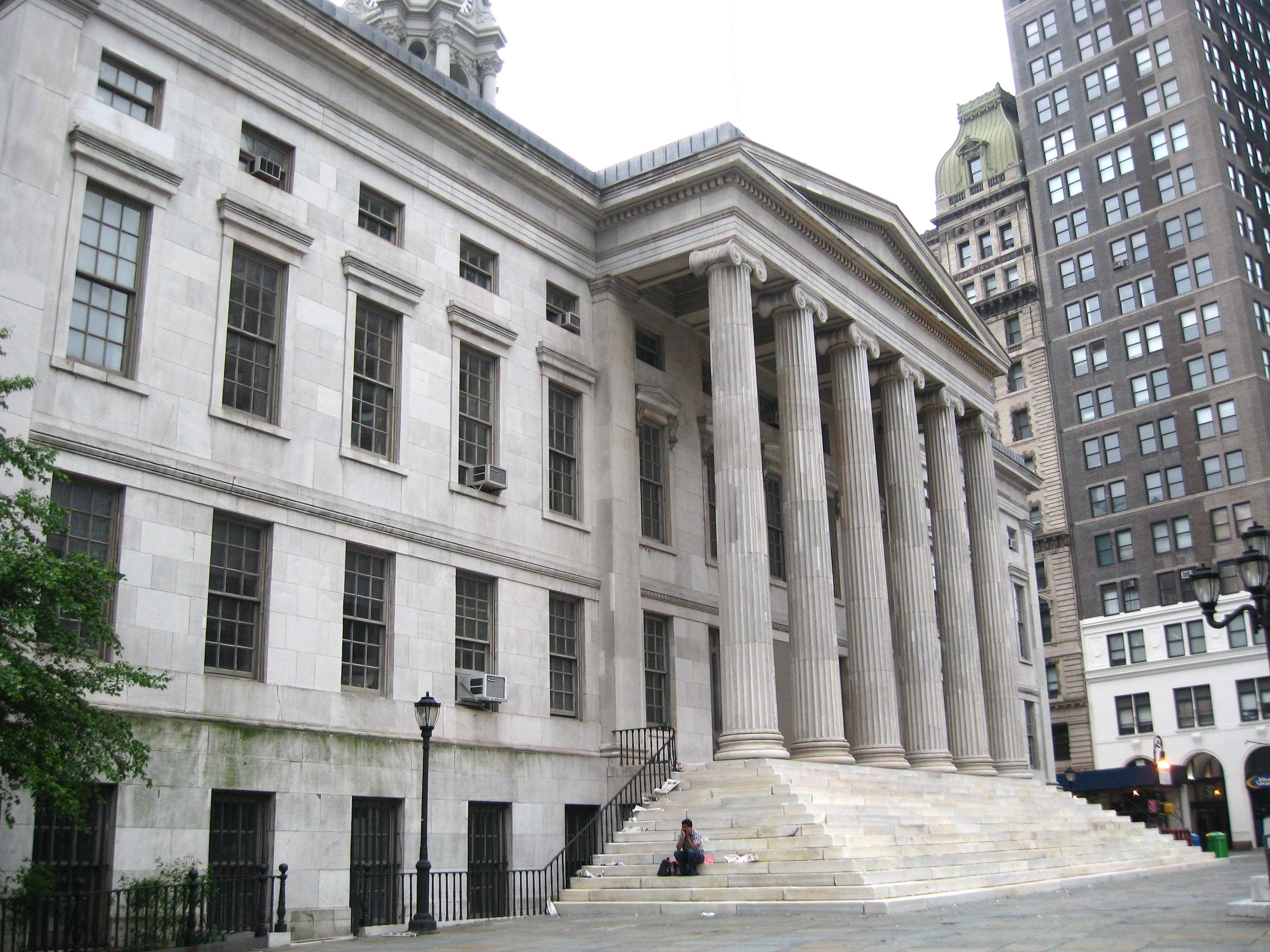
North facade details

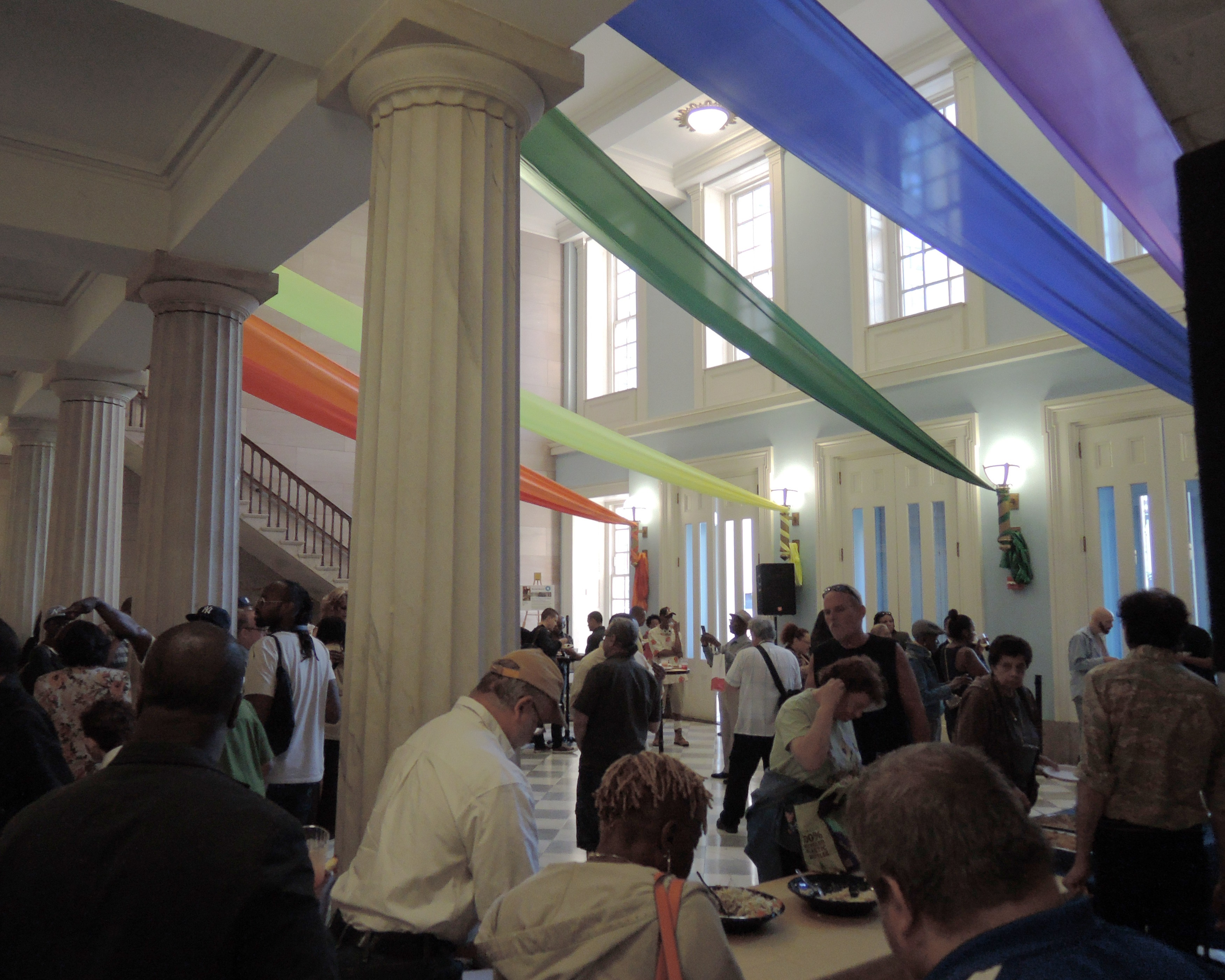
Interior

== See also ==
- List of New York City borough halls and municipal buildings
- List of New York City Designated Landmarks in Brooklyn
- National Register of Historic Places listings in Brooklyn
