= Ossining (village), New York =

Village in the United States

Ossining Sing Sing
- Village
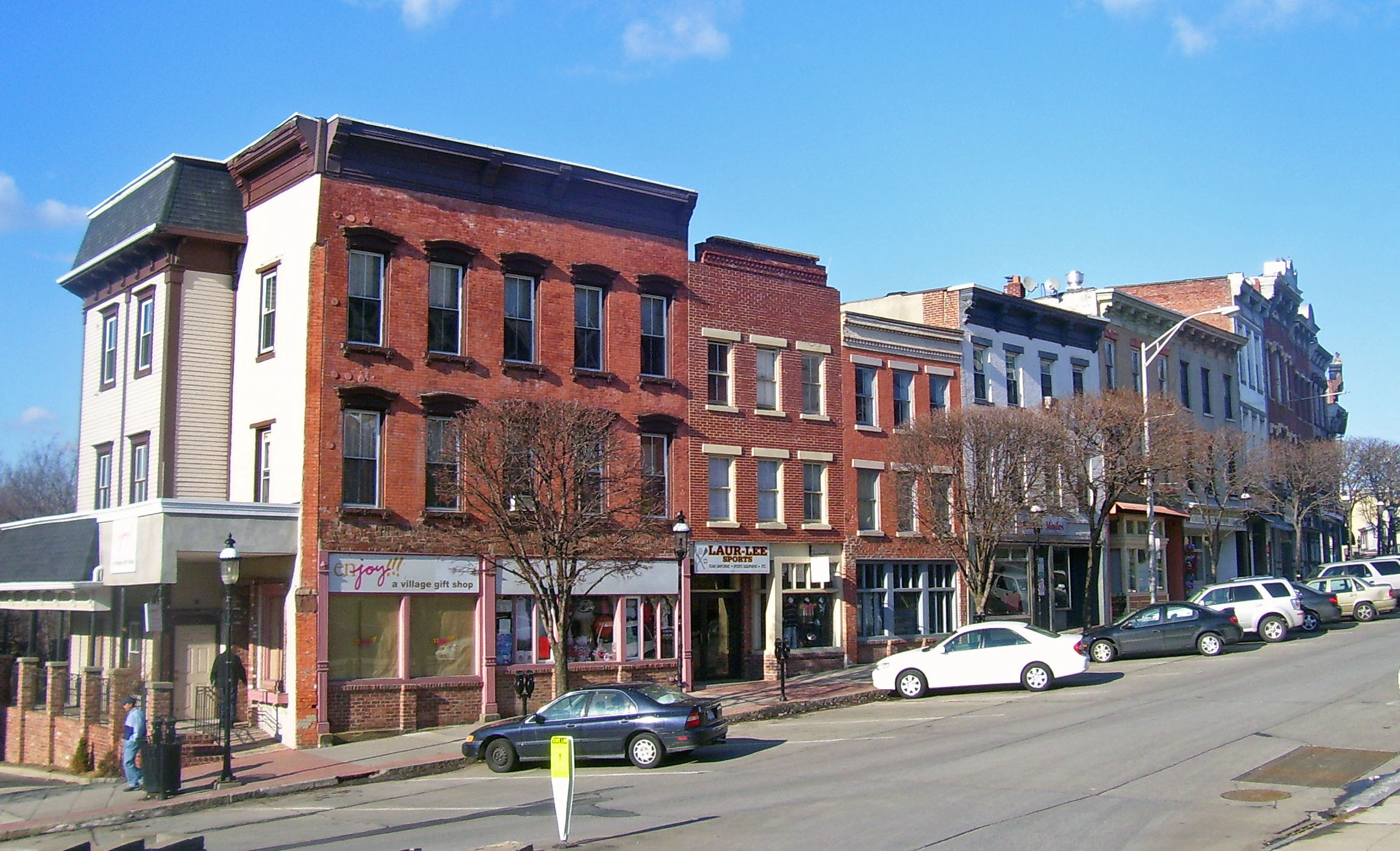
- Downtown Ossining Historic District

- Flag Seal

- Location of Ossining (village), New York
- Coordinates: 41°9′55″N 73°51′24″W
- Country: United States
- State: New York
- Region: Hudson Valley
- County: Westchester
- Town: Ossining
- Incorporated: 1813

Government
  - Type: Council–manager
  - Mayor: Rika Levin
  - Village manager: Karen D'Attore

Area
  - Total: 6.3 sq mi (16.4 km^{2})
  - Land: 3.2 sq mi (8.3 km^{2})
  - Water: 3.1 sq mi (8.1 km^{2})
- Elevation: 161 ft (49 m)

Population (2020)
  - Total: 27,551
  - Demonym: Ossinaut
- Time zone: UTC−5 (Eastern (EST))
  - Summer (DST): UTC−4 (EDT)
- ZIP Code: 10562
- Area code: 914
- FIPS code: 36-55530
- GNIS feature ID: 0959520
- Website: www.villageofossiningny.gov

Ossining (/ˈɒsɪnɪŋ/ OSS-in-ing) is a village in Westchester County, New York, United States. The population at the 2020 United States census was 27,551, an increase from 25,060 at the 2010 census. As a village, it is located in the town of Ossining.

== Geography ==
Ossining borders the eastern shores of the widest part of the Hudson River, the Tappan Zee.

According to the United States Census Bureau, the village has a total area of 6.3 square miles (16 km^{2}), of which 3.2 square miles (8.3 km^{2}) is land and 3.1 square miles (8.0 km^{2}) (49.37%) is water.

== Demographics ==
Historical population
Census	Pop.	Note	%±
1860	5,345		—
1870	4,696		−12.1%
1880	6,578		40.1%
1890	9,352		42.2%
1900	7,939		−15.1%
1910	11,480		44.6%
1920	10,739		−6.5%
1930	15,241		41.9%
1940	15,996		5.0%
1950	16,098		0.6%
1960	18,662		15.9%
1970	21,659		16.1%
1980	20,196		−6.8%
1990	22,582		11.8%
2000	24,010		6.3%
2010	25,060		4.4%
2020	27,551		9.9%
U.S. Decennial Census

As of the 2010 United States census, there were 25,060 people living in the village. The racial makeup of the village was 61.8% White, 15.6% Black, 0.1% Native American, 4.2% Asian, <0.1% Pacific Islander, 0.4% from some other race and 1.3% from two or more races. 41.4% were Hispanic or Latino of any race. According to the 2020 American Community Survey, the village was 21.7% Ecuadorian.

As of the census of 2000, there were 24,010 people, 8,227 households, and 5,339 families living in the village. The population density was 7,464.8 inhabitants per square mile (2,882.2/km^{2}). There were 8,515 housing units at an average density of 2,647.4 units per square mile (1,022.2 units/km^{2}). The racial makeup of the village was 60.5% White, 20.2% Black or African American, 0.2% Native American, 4.2% Asian, 0.0% Pacific Islander, 10.4% from other races, and 4.2% from two or more races. Hispanic or Latino of any race were 27.7% of the population.

There were 8,227 households, out of which 30.7% had children under the age of 18 living with them, 47.0% were married couples living together, 12.9% had a female householder with no husband present, and 35.1% were non-families. Of all households 28.9% were made up of individuals, and 9.6% had someone living alone who was 65 years of age or older. The average household size was 2.61 and the average family size was 3.17.

In the village, the population was spread out, with 20.7% under the age of 18, 8.3% from 18 to 24, 39.1% from 25 to 44, 20.9% from 45 to 64, and 11.0% who were 65 years of age or older. The median age was 36 years. For every 100 females, there were 117.6 males. For every 100 females age 18 and over, there were 119.4 males.

The median income for a household in the village was $52,185, and the median income for a family was $60,179. Males had a median income of $40,412 versus $36,975 for females. The per capita income for the village was $25,036. About 7.6% of families and 10.6% of the population were below the poverty line, including 12.9% of those under age 18 and 8.3% of those age 65 or over.

== History ==
Frederick Philipse bought the area that presently constitutes the Town of Ossining from the Sint Sinck Indians in 1685. The Sint Sinck are members of the Wappinger Confederacy, who inhabited the land east of Hudson River between what is now Tarrytown and Croton. His manor extended from Spuyten Duyvil Creek on the border between present-day Manhattan and the Bronx to the Croton River. The last Lord of the Manor, Frederick III, was a Loyalist in the American Revolutionary War who fled to England, so the State of New York confiscated the manor in 1779.

In 1838 Benjamin Brandreth built a manufacturing facility for his Vegetable Universal Pills, which became one of the most successful patent medicines in the United States. Brandreth's firm was at one point the nation's leading proprietary advertiser. He was president of the village for many years.

Due to Ossining's history, some of its structures are on the National Register of Historic Places, and the downtown shopping area is listed as the Downtown Ossining Historic District. In addition, the Sparta neighborhood has been designated a local historic district. Ossining's role in New York's heritage has been recognized by its inclusion, as one of only 14 areas, in an Urban Cultural Park System designed to attract visitors to the state. Also on the National Register of Historic Places are the Richard Austin House, Brandreth Pill Factory, First Baptist Church of Ossining, Highland Cottage, St. Paul's Episcopal Church and Rectory, and Washington School.

== Etymology ==
Until 1901, the village was known as Sing Sing. It changed its name to avoid the stigma of association with Sing Sing Correctional Facility, which is still Ossining's largest employer.

== Transportation ==
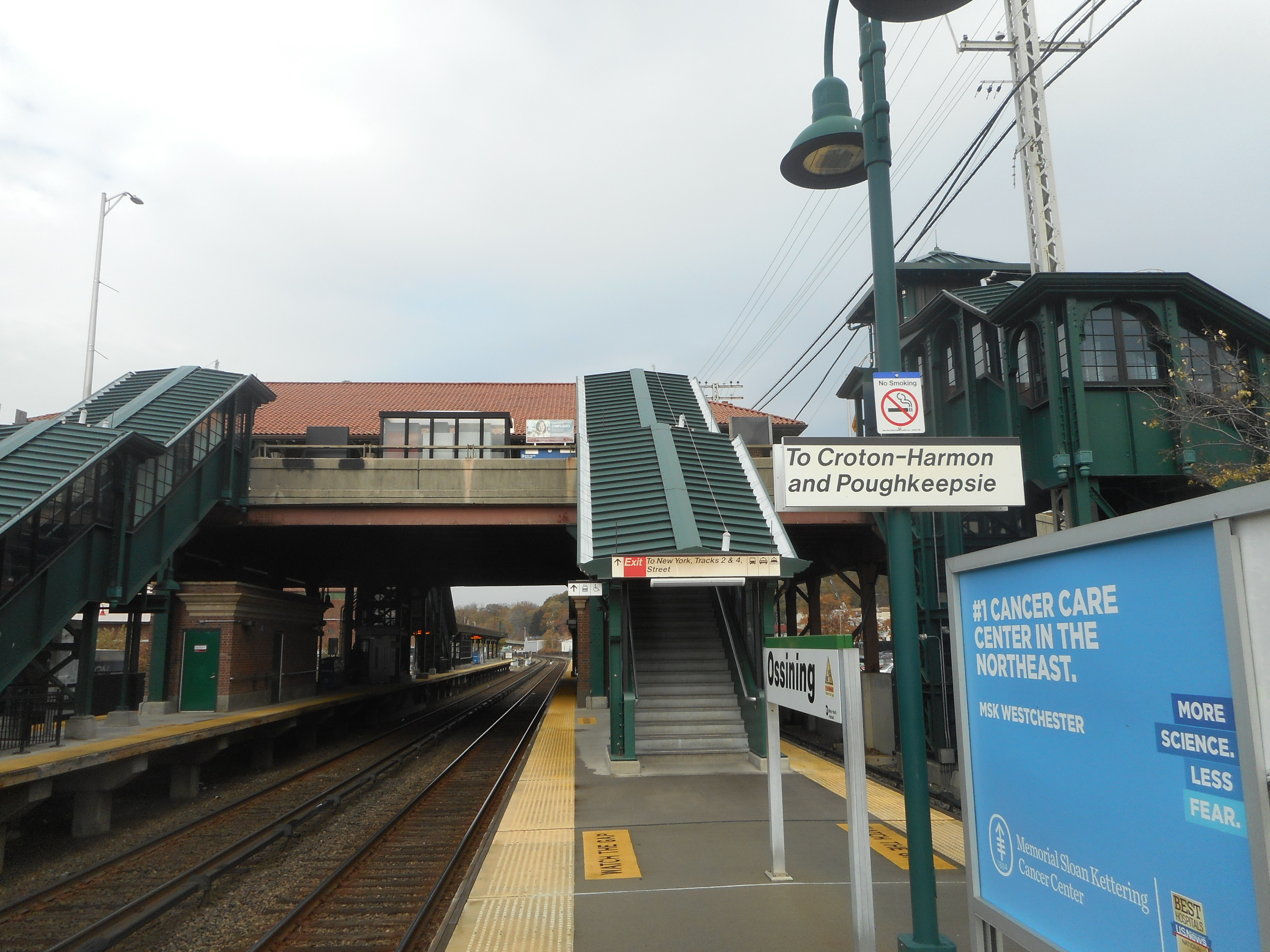
Ossining's Metro-North Station, dates back to the days of New York Central Railroad.

The Ossining train station provides commuter rail service to Grand Central Terminal in New York City or Croton-Harmon and Poughkeepsie via the Metro-North Railroad's Hudson Line. The Bee-Line Bus System provides bus service to Ossining on routes 11, 13, 14, and 19. NY Waterway also operates a ferry between Ossining and Haverstraw in Rockland County during the rush hours.

No interstate highways exist within Ossining. The closest example of a federal highway that runs through the village is US 9, along Highland Avenue and Albany Post Road. NY 133 begins at US 9, running along Croton Avenue, and NY 134 begins at that road along Dale Avenue. Part of NY 9A, along the Briarcliff–Peekskill Parkway runs through the eastern edge of the village.

== Education ==
Ossining has several public schools, operated by Ossining Union Free School District, and three nearby parochial schools. In 2000, Ossining High School was among the United States' highest performing schools.

Ossining has two nearby college campuses. A Westchester Community College campus exists in Ossining; in nearby Briarcliff Manor, there is also a Pace University campus.

=== Ossining Public Library ===
The Ossining Public Library, originally chartered in 1893 as the Sing Sing Public Library, serves the residents of the Village and Town of Ossining. The current library collections include 110,000 books, 25,000 non-print items, and 300 newspaper and magazine titles. As a charter member of the 38-member Westchester Library System, the Ossining Public Library offers its patrons access to the more than one million holdings of the other county libraries. A $15.8-million building program was started in 2005 to replace the 1960s-era facility with a new 48,000-square-foot (4,500 m^{2}) building. The new Ossining Public Library opened in March 2007 and added many new or enhanced services, including over 50 public Internet terminals, a 250-seat theater, an art gallery, and the county's first radio frequency (RFID) circulation system.

The main reading room of Ossining's library is named in honor of longtime Ossining resident, Pulitzer Prize–winning author John Cheever. When Cheever died, the flags on Ossining's public buildings were lowered for 10 days.

== Notable buildings ==
Ossining is best known as the location of the Sing Sing Correctional Facility, one of the most famous prisons in America.

Ossining is also the home of the worldwide Maryknoll Catholic missions, as well as the site of the Crotonville Institute, the famous General Electric leadership training facility, founded in 1956.

== In fiction ==
In seasons 1–3 of AMC's TV series Mad Men, Ossining is home to lead character Don Draper and his family. It remains the home of his ex-wife Betty and their children through much of season 4, until they move to Rye.

In FX's The Shield, transfer to Ossining is offered to an inmate in exchange for testimony, stated as "Safe and sound in Ossining, New York" as opposed to referencing the town's original name of Sing Sing which might have jeopardized the deal.

== Notable people ==
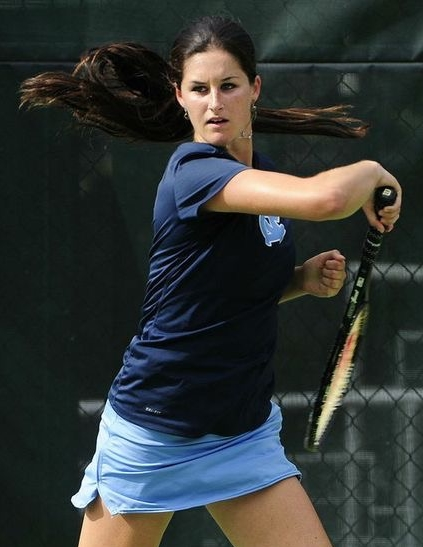
Jamie Loeb

- Henry Campbell Black, author Black's Law Dictionary; born 1860
- Edmund March Blunt, navigator and publisher, lived in Ossining
- Ken Buck, U.S. representative for Colorado, born in Ossining
- Robert Byrne, grandmaster of chess
- John Cheever, writer and winner of the 1979 Pulitzer Prize for Fiction, lived in Ossining from 1961 until his death in 1982
- Nick DiPaolo, comedian, known for Tough Crowd
- Peter Falk, actor, attended Ossining High School
- Anne Francis, actress, born in Ossining
- Jamie Loeb (born 1995), tennis player
- Raven-Symoné, actress
- Sonny Sharrock (1940–1994), jazz guitarist, born in Ossining and namesake of a street
- Jesse Lee Soffer, (actor) born in Ossining; best known as Det Jay Halstead on Chicago PD, Med, and Fire
- Obi Toppin, Basketball player, Went to the University of Dayton and won National Player of the Year in 2020
- Stefan Zweig, Austrian writer, lived briefly in Ossining and completed his autobiography there in 1941

== Twin cities ==
- Sassinoro, Italy

== Fire Department vehicle gallery ==
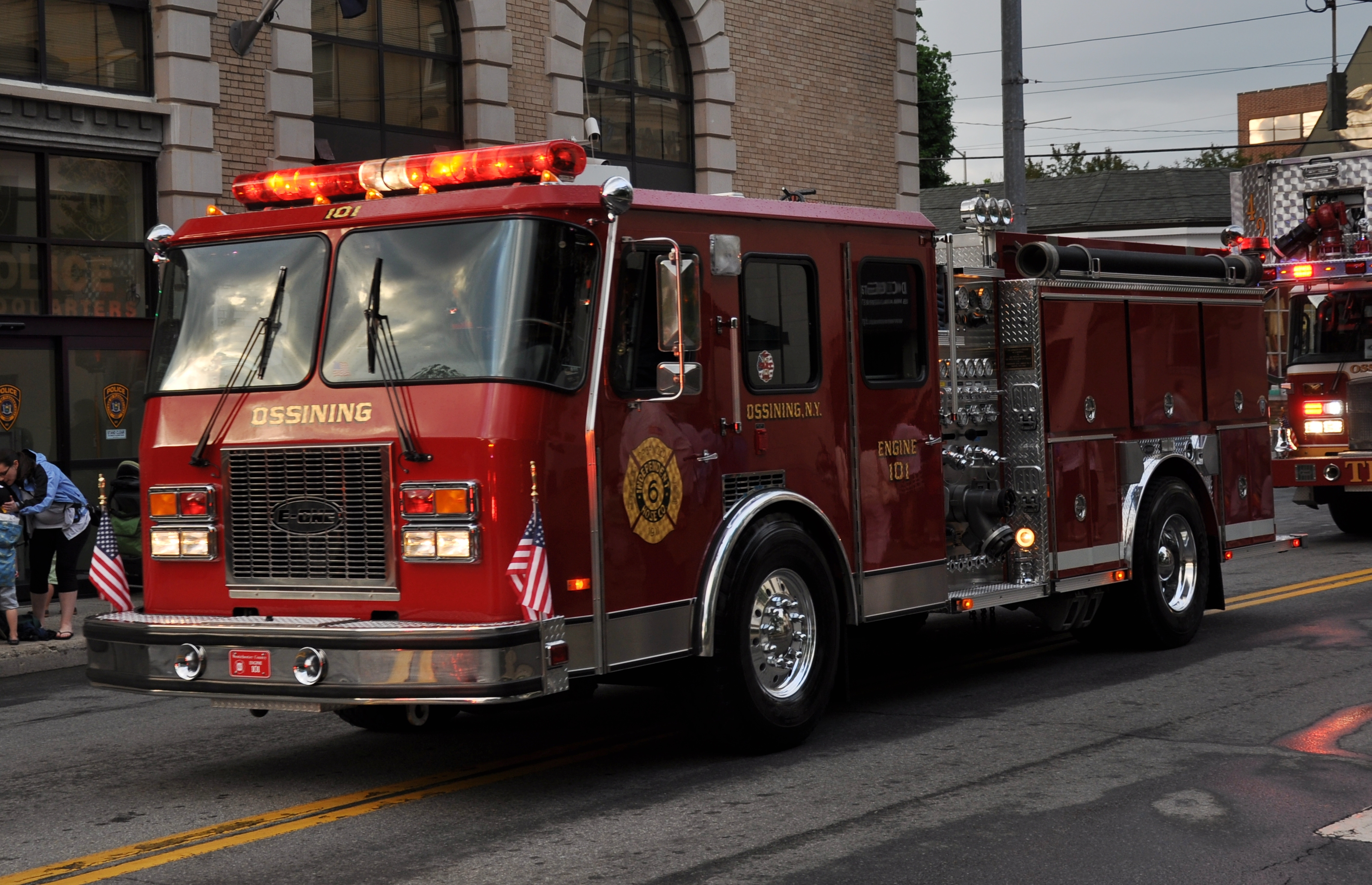
Engine 101, a 1993 E-One 1250/750

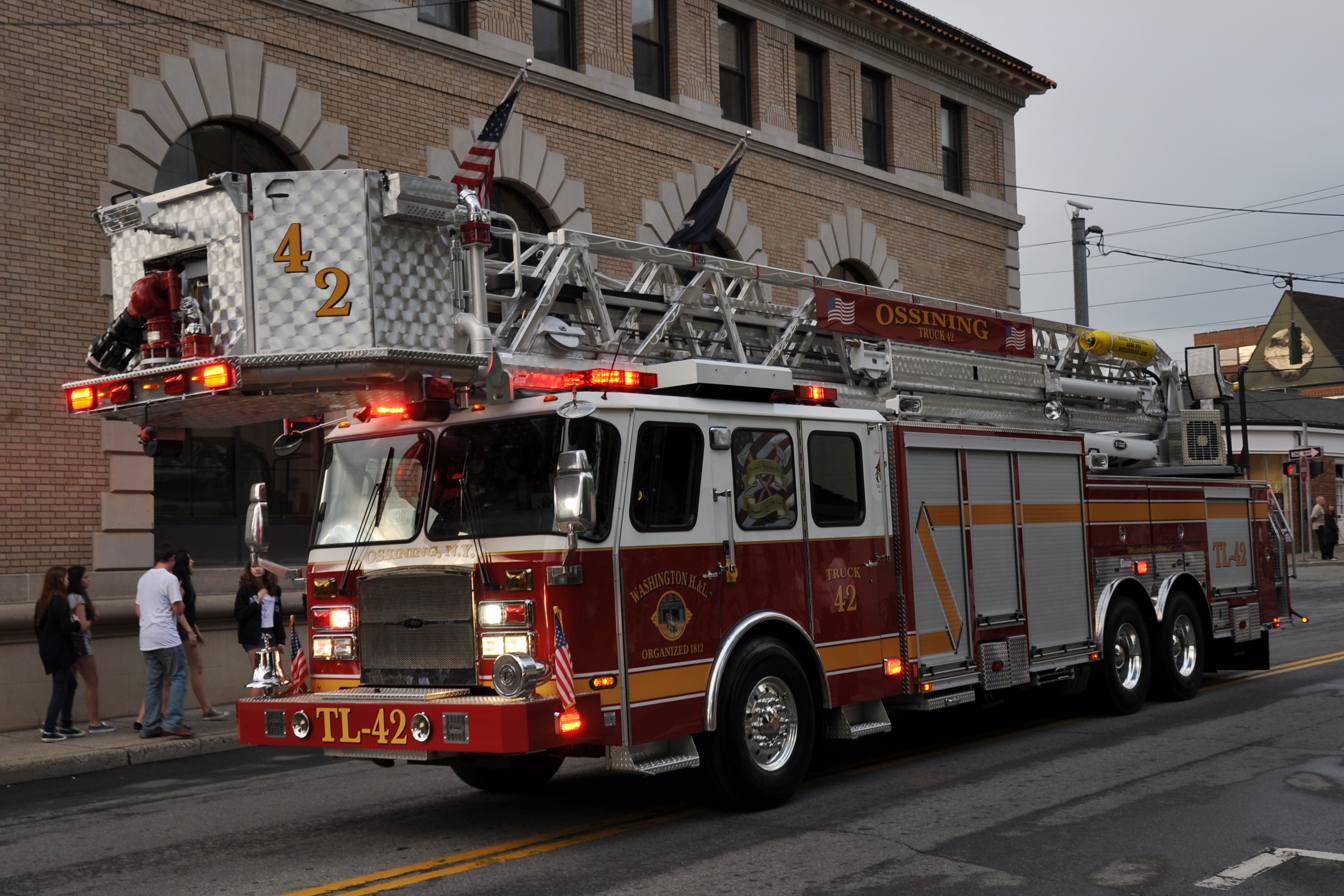
Tower Ladder 42, a 2010 E-One 100 ft.

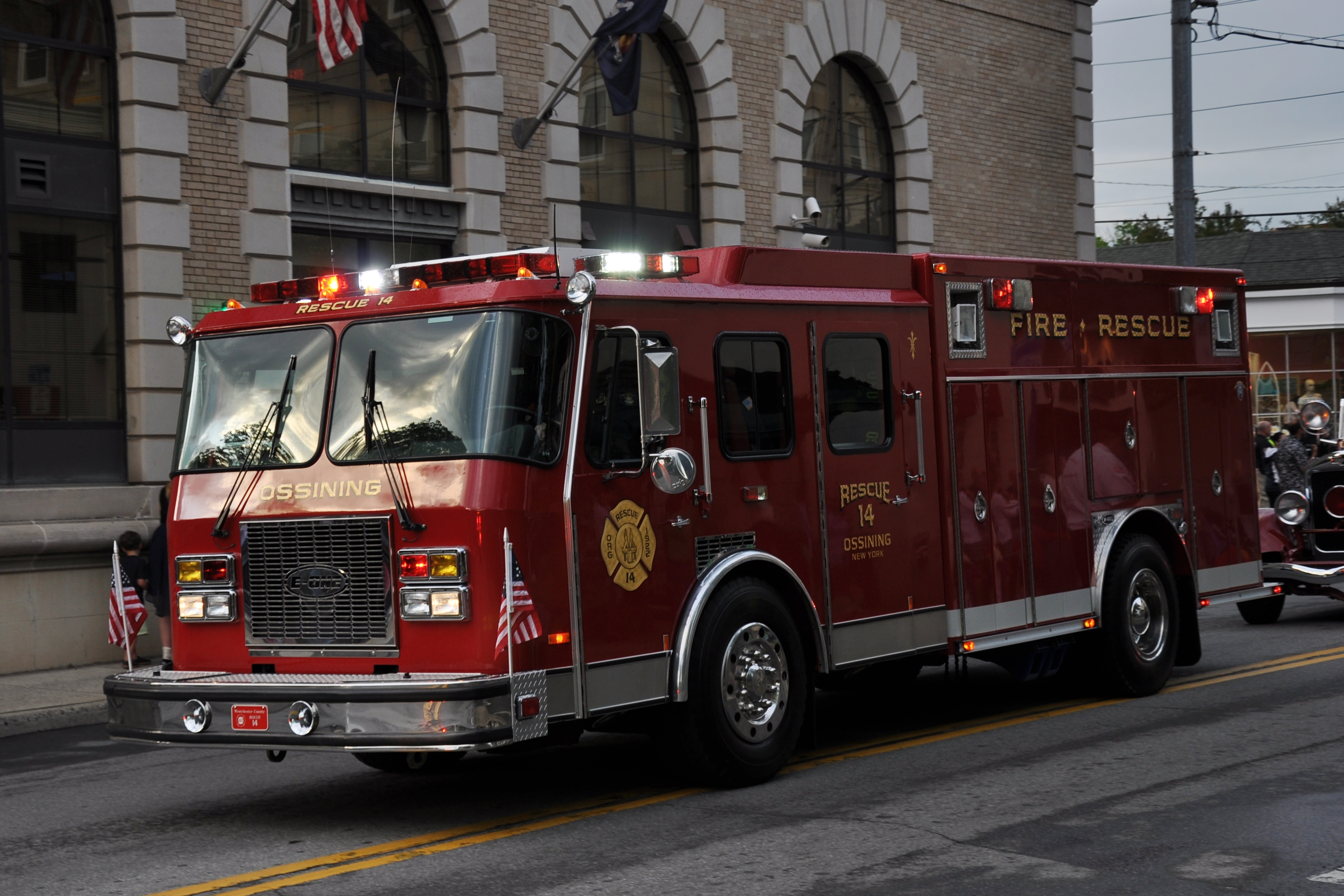
Rescue 14, a 1995 E-One

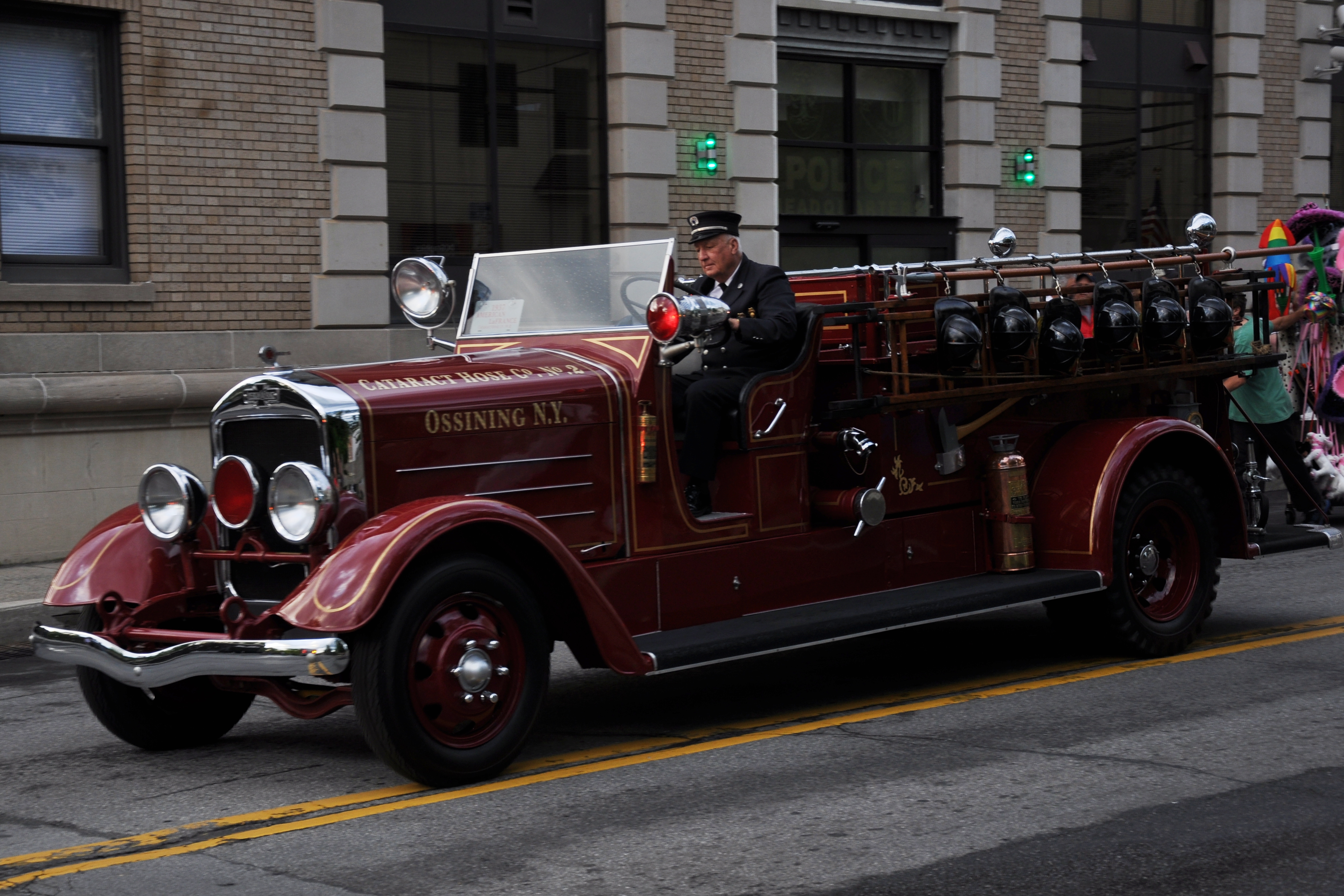
Engine 97, a 1937 American LaFrance, department antique
