= Richard Austin House =

Historic house in New York, United States

- U.S. National Register of Historic Places
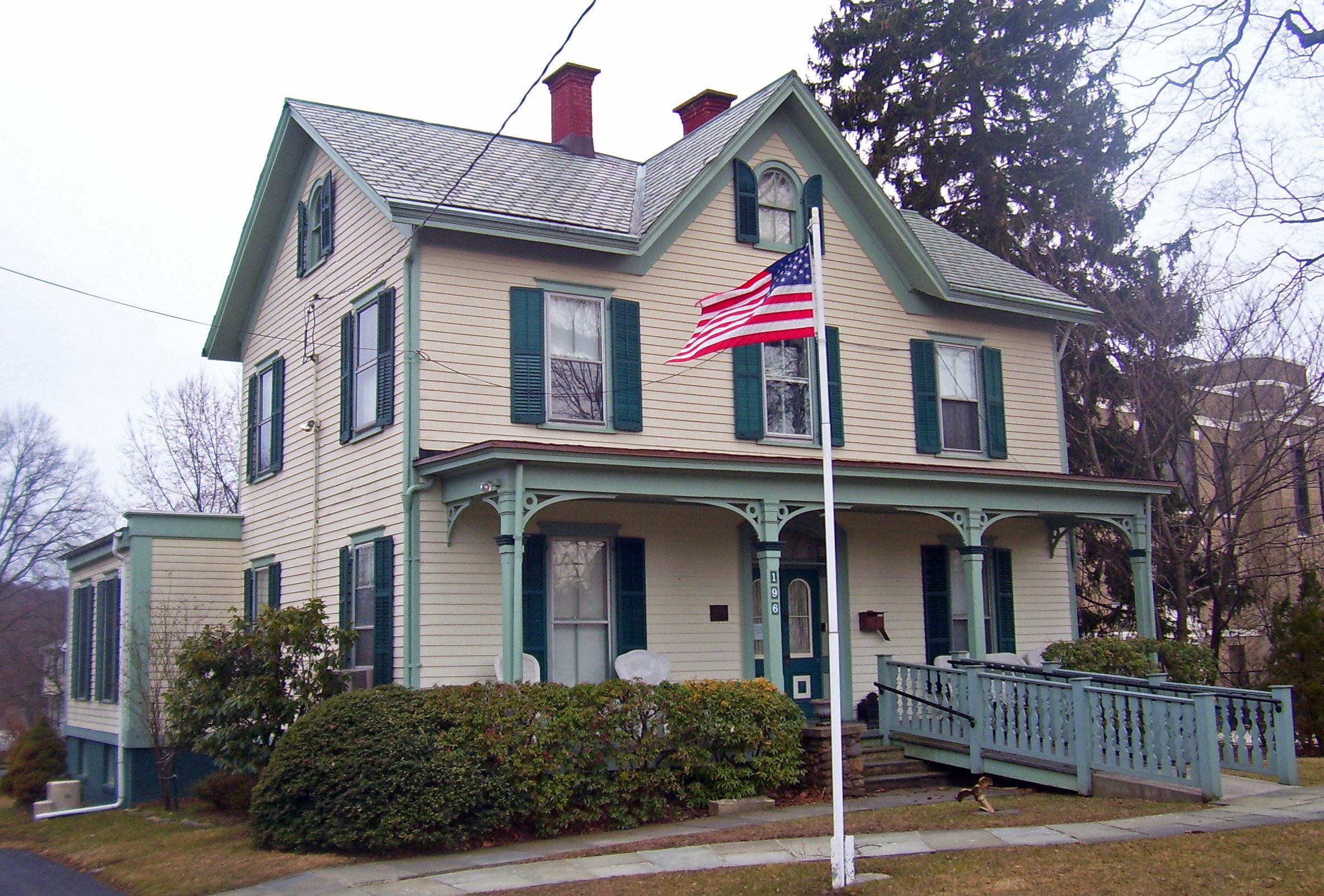
- East profile and north elevation, 2009

- Location within New York Location within the United States
- Location: Ossining, NY
- Nearest city: White Plains
- Coordinates: 41°10′01″N 73°50′45″W
- Area: 0.5 acres (2,000 m^{2})
- Built: 1878
- Architectural style: Gothic Revival
- NRHP reference No.: 88001527
- Added to NRHP: September 20, 1988

The Richard Austin House is located on Croton Avenue (New York State Route 133) in the village of Ossining, New York, United States. It is a wood frame structure dating to the 1870s. In 1989 it was added to the National Register of Historic Places.

At the time the house was built, Ossining was beginning its transition from a country town to a commuter suburb of New York City. The Austin House is one of the few from that period of the community's history to remain completely intact, both outside and in, although two extensions were added in the 20th century. It is currently the home of the Ossining Historical Society, which operates a museum in the building.

== Building and grounds ==
The house is located on a half-acre (2,000 m^{2}) lot at the east corner of Croton and Bradshaw Drive, a short cul-de-sac in eastern Ossining. To the west and southwest is Roosevelt School, a public elementary school. Across the street, on the north side of Croton, is Ossining Gospel Assembly of God Church. East, across Bradshaw, are 20th-century houses, which otherwise predominate in this section of the village. The terrain is a level area between low hills on the east and west.

A group of mature shade trees buffer the lot along Croton. From the corner a driveway leads to a small parking lot south of the house. A flagpole is on the front lawn. A display case on the property holds an old farm wagon and an original mile marker from the Albany Post Road. These are not considered to contribute to the site's historic character. However, a well in the south yard, now covered by a large block of slate, is believed to be original to the property, and is thus the only other contributing resource to the house's Register listing.

=== Exterior ===
The main block of the house is a two-and-a-half-story, rectangular, three-bay gable-roofed wood frame structure on a brick and stone foundation. Attached to the southeast corner is a similar extension, giving the whole house an L shape. Detached from this extension is a one-story frame gabled garage.

All faces are sided in clapboard. Across the first story of the north (front) facade is a wooden veranda. Its chamfered wooden posts with scroll-sawn side brackets hold up a flat wooden roof. Stone stairs, alongside a balustraded wooden wheelchair ramp, lead up to the deck, which has a latticework wooden drape below. A similar veranda is located on the south.

On both stories, windows are set with double-hung two-over-two sash, with decorative drip-mold wooden lintels and flanking louvered wooden shutters. The attic windows are smaller and round-arched, but otherwise have the same treatment. On the rear extension's west face, the windows of a small flat-roofed projecting bay are one-over-one double-hung sash, and are matched by recessed panels in the basement beneath. The south (rear) facade of the main block has the same window treatment but a simpler, square, single-light, single-hung attic window.

Below the roofline is a simple wooden frieze. Above it the broad overhanging eaves end in a molded cornice. The roof itself is shingled in slate and pierced in the middle by three corbelled brick chimneys with stone caps.

The garage addition has a gabled roof. Its foundation is purely brick. It has three-light casement windows in the basement and large double doors with six-light windows.

=== Interior ===
An extensively molded surround frames the segmental arched main entrance. It has panelled reveals and a transom with a single light. The double doors have decorated panels below double-light hinged windows. They open onto the original floor plan. A central hall with a stairway to the upper floors. On the east is a living room, with a dining room opposite, and the kitchen to the rear of that. Double doors at the south end lead to the rear veranda.

The main feature of the living room is its original fireplace. It has a stone hearth, black brick surround (giving way to red at the chimney). Its molded wooden surround and mantelpiece have square pilaster capitals below a frieze with a floral pattern.

Both the living and dining rooms share molded baseboards and ceilings connected to the wall with a slight cavetto. The dining's room fireplace has been covered. Its most notable decorative feature is the entryway to the projecting west bay, an elliptical arch with projecting brackets. Within the bay itself the walls have panels below the windows. The kitchen, to the south, has low vertical wainscoting and a recess for the old dumbwaiter in the rear wall. A door in its south wall leads to a section of the garage that has been renovated into living space.

A staircase with a turned and panelled newel post, octagonal at its base, and a balustrade featuring turned and fluted balusters leads up to the second floor. From there it extends along the hall to the door to the attic stairs. There are four bedrooms. The floor has a lower baseboard than the first floor and no molded detailing, but is otherwise similar to the downstairs. The master bedroom has its own bath, the dumbwaiter's upper recess, and a closet incorporating two chests, their drawers retaining their detailed handles. In the south wall of the hallway, a door leads to stairs with a molded handrail down to the kitchen. Next to it another door opens onto the rear veranda's roof.

With the exception of an east room set off by vertical boards, the attic is unfinished. Brick nogging is in between the gable studs and the rafters, where they meet the floor. Below the first floor, double bulkhead doors of paneled wood sheathed in metal under a segmental arched brick lintel lead to the basement. Inside, the basement has a concrete floor, round wooden supports and a wooden staircase to the kitchen.

The garage addition's first floor has been extensively renovated for residential purposes and does not have much of its original finish. Some traces remain, such as the stuccoed walls, tin ceilings and ceiling radiators.

== History ==
Originally known as Sing Sing, Ossining was for its earliest years primarily a port along the Hudson River, where farmers further inland brought their crops to ship to the markets of New York City downriver. They came down the Croton Turnpike, today Route 133, or the Albany Post Road (now U.S. Route 9). The settlement became Westchester County's first incorporated village in 1813.

Development began to benefit Ossining in the next several decades. First the Post Road was relocated to the west, creating the crossroads that now centers the village's downtown. Then, later in the decade, the prison was built. A decade afterwards, in 1837, the Old Croton Aqueduct, no longer in use today but a National Historic Landmark, was built through downtown, to provide water to New York. This era was capped by the construction of the Hudson River Railroad in 1849.

Ossining was now an hour from the city by train, making it possible to work there and live in what was still the country. Within the railroad's first year it was already offering three extra trains during morning rush hour two years later it had to add another one. The combined population of the village and the surrounding Town of Ossining nearly doubled in the railroad's first six years. The Civil War in the early 1860s slowed this growth but did not stop it. By 1880, it had grown by more than 50%, to almost three times its 1850 population.

During this era Richard Austin, a local lawyer whose family had been living in the area since 1820, was one of many to recognize the potential for growth. Along with his family, he bought vacant local parcels and sold them to people who would build houses on them. Throughout the seven decades of peak development in Ossining, records show that Austin, his father and grandfather were involved in 58 real estate transactions.

In 1878, he was living on Main Street downtown, near where he worked. He decided to build a new family home on two acres (8,100 m^{2}) then just outside the village limit, in an area where farmland was slowly giving way to middle-class housing. There were over 20 houses within a half-mile (1 km) of the site.

Austin chose to build in the Gothic Revival style's Picturesque mode. This movement had been kicked off in the 1830s by the writings of Andrew Jackson Downing, who lived further up the Hudson in Newburgh. In his pattern books, particularly The Architecture of Country Houses, he extolled the rustic simplicity of the many cottage designs as more honest and attuned to the surrounding natural landscape in a way that the Greek Revival, the preferred mode for country homes in the early 19th century, could not possibly be.

While it is a rather late application of the style, the Austin House nevertheless has the features Downing advocated. It has a single, symmetrical form with cross-gables and a full-width veranda. Ornament is not shunned but reserved for the main features of the house, such as the brackets on the veranda and the main entrance's door paneling. While it is unavoidably present, it remains simple in character, another virtue Downing sought.

The Austins lived in the house for 15 years after its construction, by which time the suburbanization of Ossining was complete. After they sold the house in 1893, it passed through other private owners. One of them built the two-and-a-half-story rear addition in 1911. In 1920, a barn that had originally been on the rear of the property was removed to a short distance away and converted into a residence. By 1930, the garage addition had been built.

There have been no other significant changes to the house. In 1970, it was sold to the Ossining Historical Society, which moved there from its former quarters in Washington School, another National Register-listed property a mile to the west along Croton. It uses the house as its offices and a museum, open by appointment only.

== See also ==
- National Register of Historic Places listings in northern Westchester County, New York
