= National Cartoon Museum =

American museum dedicated to cartoons, comic strips and animation

- Illustration of the museum during its Port Chester era.
- Established: 1974
- Dissolved: 2002
- Location: As the Museum of Cartoon Art: Stamford, Connecticut, then Greenwich, Connecticut then Port Chester, New York; As National Cartoon Museum/International Museum of Cartoon Art: Boca Raton, Florida
- Type: The collection, preservation and exhibition of cartoons, comic strips and animation
- Collection size: 200,000 original drawings 20,000 comic books 1000 hours of film and tape
- Curator: Gary Hood (1996)

The National Cartoon Museum was an American museum dedicated to the collection, preservation and exhibition of cartoons, comic strips and animation. It was the brainchild of Mort Walker, creator of Beetle Bailey. The museum opened in 1974, and went through several name changes, relocations, and temporary closures, before finally closing for good in 2002.

Originally known as the Museum of Cartoon Art, the name was changed to the National Cartoon Museum when it moved to Boca Raton, Florida, in 1992. In 1996, it became the International Museum of Cartoon Art.

In June 2008, Walker's collection was merged with the Billy Ireland Cartoon Library & Museum, affiliated with Ohio State University in Columbus, Ohio.

== History ==
brochure from the 1996–2002 period

Walker began preserving cartoon artwork in the 1940s after he discovered King Features Syndicate using Krazy Kat drawings to sop up water leaks. Walker lived in Greenwich, Connecticut, and in 1974, with a contribution of $50,000 from the Hearst Foundation, he opened his museum nearby at 850 Canal Street in Stamford, Connecticut. Two years later, the landlord decided he could rent the mansion for more, forcing a move to a space on Field Point Road in Greenwich, Connecticut. Later, the museum occupied Ward's Castle, a large, dilapidated house in Port Chester, New York.

In late 1991 the city of Boca Raton, Florida, invited Walker to relocate there, and the museum prepared to move in 1992.

While working to re-open, the museum was robbed of Dick Tracy and Prince Valiant originals, as well as some Disney animation cels. After acquiring more funding, and a donation of Disney art from Diamond Comic Distributors' Steve Geppi, the newly minted International Museum of Cartoon Art finally opened the doors to its new facility in 1996. Gary Hood was appointed director of curatorial affairs.

However, the museum did not attract enough donations and two corporate sponsors went bankrupt. In 1998, the Hearst Foundation again stepped in, giving the museum $1 million. Nonetheless, to pay off some of the debts (including outstanding mortgage payments), Walker auctioned off a Mickey Mouse drawing in 2001 for $700,000. It was not enough, however; the museum was forced to close in 2002, and the collection was put into storage.

An attempt was made to relocate to three floors of the Empire State Building in New York City in 2007, but the deal fell through for reasons that are disputed. Walker finally accepted an offer to merge his collection with that of Ohio State University in 2008.

== Collection ==
The collection includes over 200,000 original drawings, 20,000 comic books, 1000 hours of film and tape, and various other items. It consists almost entirely of donations from artists, including Chester Gould (Dick Tracy), Hal Foster (Prince Valiant), Bil Keane (Family Circus), political cartoonist Jeff MacNelly, Mike Peters (Mother Goose and Grimm), Milton Caniff (Terry and the Pirates), Dik Browne (Hägar the Horrible), Stan Lee (Spider-Man), Rube Goldberg and others. According to the curators, it is valued at an estimated $20 million. Among its prized possessions is the first drawing of Mickey Mouse, by Ub Iwerks for the character's film debut in Plane Crazy (1928).

== William Randolph Hearst Cartoon Hall of Fame ==
Begun in 1974, the Hall of Fame was renamed the William Randolph Hearst Cartoon Hall of Fame in 1997 after a sponsorship was provided by the Hearst Foundation. The 31 inductees, chosen by non-cartoonist authorities, are:

- Peter Arno
- Carl Barks
- Dik Browne
- Milton Caniff
- Al Capp
- Roy Crane
- Billy DeBeck
- Rudolph Dirks
- Walt Disney
- Will Eisner
- Bud Fisher
- Harold Foster
- Charles Dana Gibson
- Rube Goldberg
- Chester Gould
- Harold Gray
- Cathy Guisewite
- George Herriman
- Lynn Johnston
- Chuck Jones
- Walt Kelly
- Winsor McCay
- George McManus
- Thomas Nast
- Frederick Opper
- Richard Outcault
- Alex Raymond
- Charles Schulz
- Elzie Segar
- Jimmy Swinnerton
- Mort Walker
- Chic Young

== See also ==
- Bill Blackbeard
- Fred Waring Cartoon Collection
