= First Baptist Church of Ossining =

Historic church in New York, United States

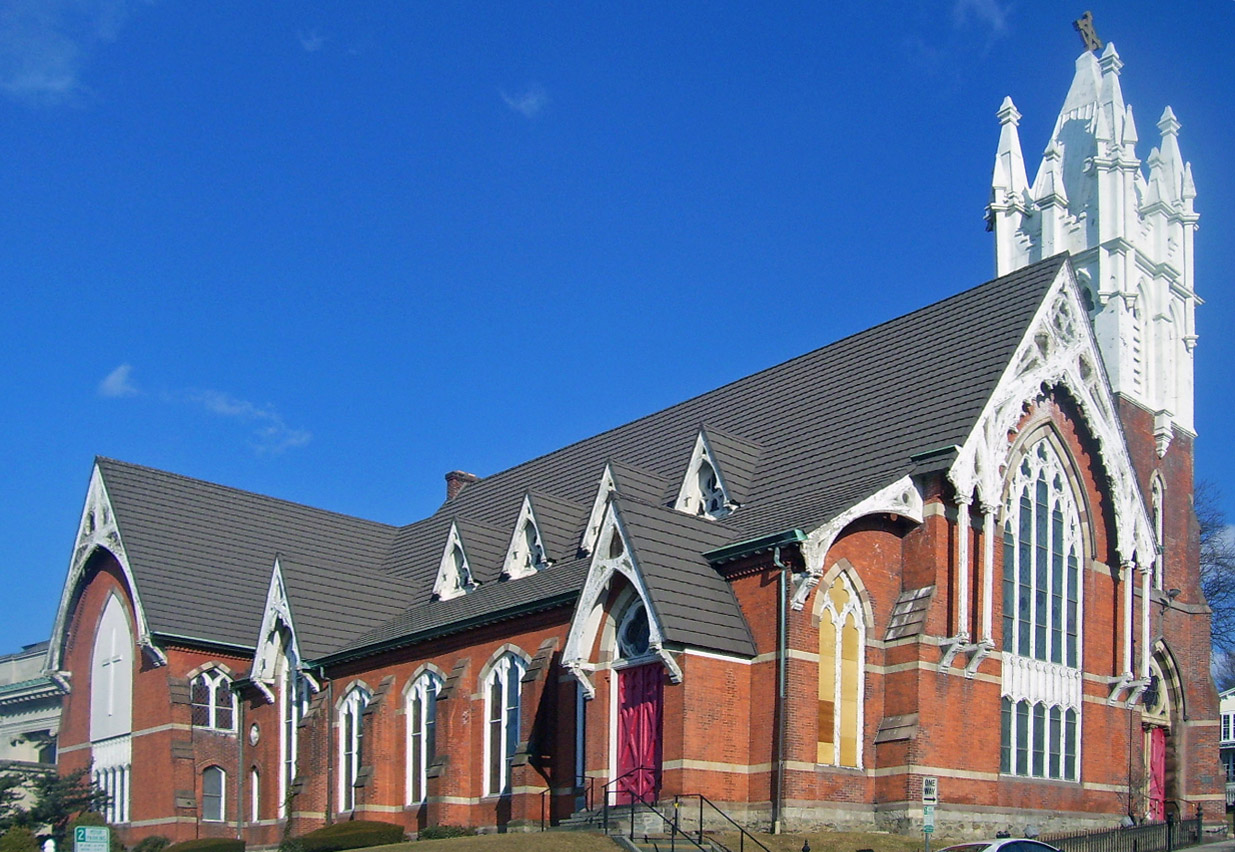
- West and south elevation, 2009

Religion
- Affiliation: Baptist
- Leadership: The Rev. Dr. Gordon S. Anderson

Location
- Location: Ossining, NY, USA
- Interactive map of First Baptist Church of Ossining
- Coordinates: 41°9′40″N 73°51′42″W

Architecture
- Architect: J. Walsh
- Type: John Hoff
- Style: Gothic Revival
- Completed: 1874
- Construction cost: $75,000

Specifications
- Direction of façade: South
- Materials: Brick, wood and slate

U.S. National Register of Historic Places
- Added to NRHP: January 12, 1973
- NRHP Reference no.: 73001288

Website
- Historic First Baptist Church of Ossining

The First Baptist Church of Ossining is located in the center of the village of Ossining, New York, United States. It is a brick building in the Gothic Revival architectural style with a tall wooden steeple built in the 1870s, one of Ossining's most prominent landmarks. In 1973 it was listed on the National Register of Historic Places. Sixteen years later, in 1989, it was included as a contributing property to the Downtown Ossining Historic District when it was listed on the Register.

First Baptist, begun in late 18th-century prayer meetings, is the oldest religious congregation in Ossining.

== Building ==
=== Exterior ===
A low cast-iron fence surrounds the lot, shaded on the east side by tall mature trees. The building itself is a one-and-a-half–story T-shaped brick structure on a stone foundation. Its steeply pitched gabled roofs are shingled in slate and pierced by four similarly gabled dormer windows on either side. On the east corner of the south (front) elevation is a tall steeple with the main entrance. The west elevation has a shed-roofed wing.

That facade has a large five-part lancet arched stained glass window springing from a stone belt course. In its upper woodwork are quatrefoils, the church exterior's principal motif, surmounted by segmented limestone. Two fluted wooden colonettes rising from corbels on either side support an intricate vergeboard with more quatrefoils amid it. It hides the exposed hammerbeam trusses of the roof's structural system.

A smaller two-part window at the front of the west wing has a similar treatment to the main window, with a smaller quatrefoil. Just around the corner is a gabled side entrance with projecting roof supported by side brackets and a large quatrefoil in the transom. The four small tripartite arched stained glass windows along the facade to the north are separated by buttresses. At their north another steep gabled projection with quatrefoil and vergeboards shelters a taller, narrow tripartite arched window. At the very end is a smaller, narrower window with corresponding quatrefoil. On the east, a fifth window is located at the south end; otherwise, its fenestration is identical. The roof dormers, on both sides, have vergeboards that form quatrefoils.

Both ends of the rear section are centered around large blind lancet arches with crosses. Below the west window are three narrow windows set in the same wood as the arch; the east side has two arched double-hung windows beneath the blind arch with a third such window to the north and a single-paned diamond-glass window to the south. A vergeboard pattern echoes the arch on the west end; the east end has no vergeboards but a row of corbeled bricks paralleling the roofline.

On the north facade the central section projects slightly. It has a window similar to its counterpart upfront, without the flanking colonettes. Above it are the exposed trusses, without any vergeboards. The two sections on the rear of the cross-section have narrow windows in their exposed basement and a single tripartite lancet-arched stained-glass window in the second story.

==== Steeple ====
The first of the steeple's four stages has corner buttresses and two stone belt courses, the upper one serving as the springline for the quatrefoiled transom over the main entrance on the south side. Another course, slightly flared, marks the beginning of the next stage, with a narrow lancet window in the center of each side. Each has diamond glass and some vergeboard in the arch.

Above each window is the beginning of a square wooden central column that divides the two louvered lancet-arched vents on each face, now done in painted galvanized sheet iron rather than brick. Midway up each corner, smaller square columns begin. All rise through the cornice that tops the third stage, where they end in pyramids topped by nested pyramids, the corners higher than the central columns, all echoing the steeple's peaked roof. At its top is a small Celtic cross.

=== Interior ===
A heavy wooden double door in a limestone-topped lancet arch leads into the sanctuary. It leads to an interior with extensive and ornate carved woodwork in Gothic motifs set amid plaster walls. A wide central aisle divides the box pews, their aisle ends topped with a trefoil motif. Two narrower aisles run through the side sections from either entrance. The floor is carpeted. The intricate stained-glass windows depict Biblical scenes of importance to the church's evangelical beliefs.

Round wooden columns, corniced midway up, support the ceiling's exposed trusses. Narrower columns support the balcony in the rear, and the three-faceted balcony with the church's pipe organ over the altar, raised five feet (1.5 m) off the floor. Atop it is an 8-by-10-foot (2.4 by 3.0 m) white marble baptistry. The rooms in the basement are used for Sunday school classes, meetings and office space.

== History ==
Elijah Hunter, a captain in the Revolutionary War who founded Ossining, started holding Baptist prayer meetings at his house in 1786. This grew rapidly, and four years later, 33 congregants formally incorporated the church. They continued to meet in homes until Hunter donated the land for a small meeting house on the present site in 1815. During the early years, slaves and their masters attended services. Both were considered full members of the congregation, and treated equally in the church.

The original building was altered in 1834, and again in 1850. Originally the church had no facility for baptisms, so those took place in a small cove on the Hudson River just south of where the village's train station is now. In 1865 the present white marble baptistry was installed.

By that time the church was beginning to outgrow its original structure, and the congregation began considering a new one. Brooklyn architect J. Walsh's Gothic Revival design, with triangles and quatrefoils representing the Trinity and the four Gospels respectively, was dedicated in 1874. It had cost $75,000 ($2.13 million in modern dollars) for local contractor John Hoff to build. The church was able to finance it purely from donations from the congregation, without taking out a mortgage.

Later in the 19th century the church continued its early tradition of support for the local African-American community. At its centennial celebrations in 1890, an itinerant African-American minister requested the church's help in establishing a 'black' Baptist Church in the village. First Baptist and its congregation responded, and Star of Bethlehem Baptist Church was established on South Spring Street. It continues to hold services today.

In 1916 the church was wired for electricity. Almost a century later, after its 200th anniversary celebrations, the church and donors were able to restore all the original stained glass windows. There have been no significant alterations to the building other than those.

== See also ==
- National Register of Historic Places listings in northern Westchester County, New York
