= Highland Cottage =

Historic house in New York, United States

- U.S. National Register of Historic Places
- U.S. Historic district – Contributing property
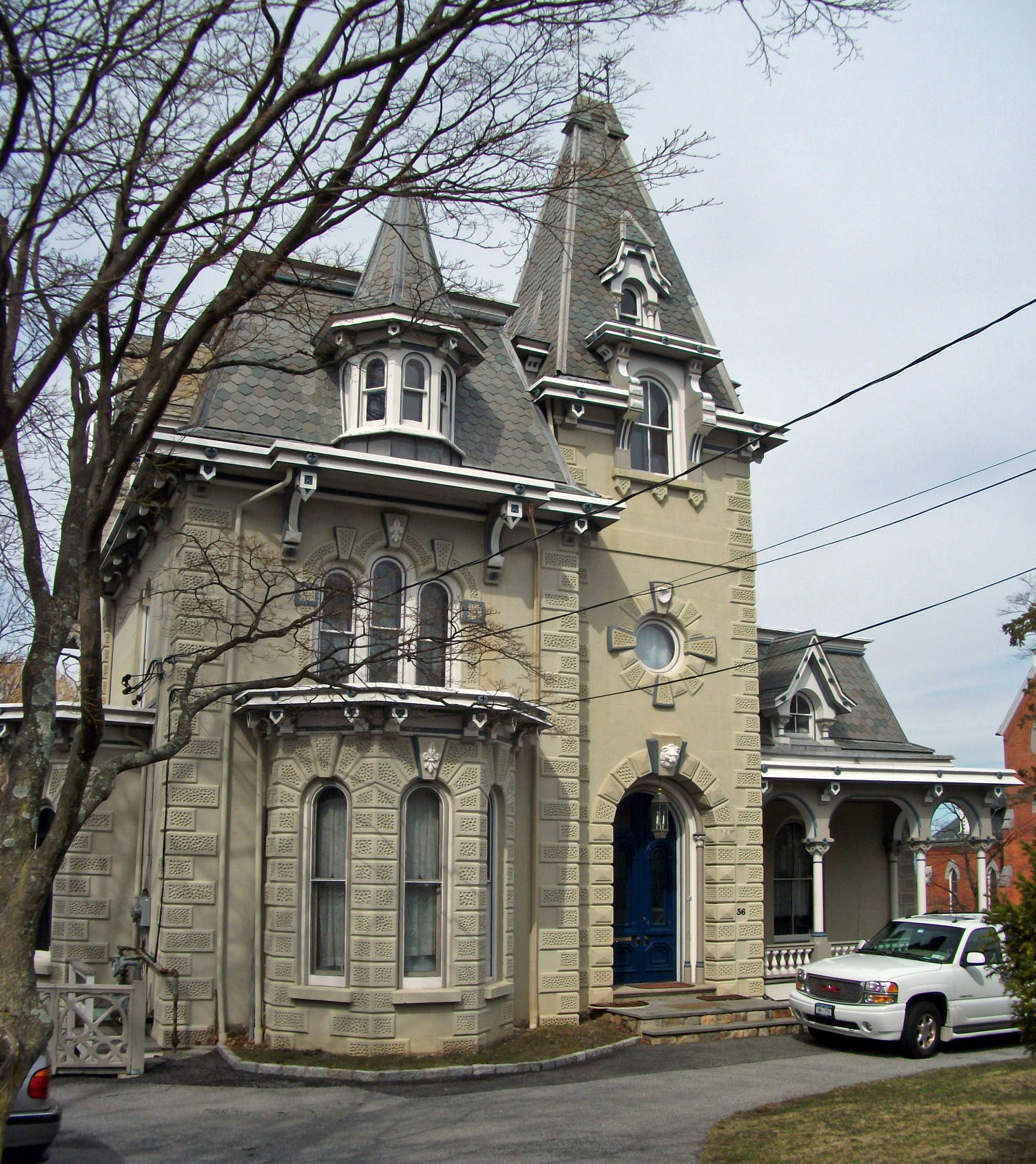
- East (front) elevation, 2010

- Location within New York Location within the United States
- Location: Ossining, NY
- Nearest city: White Plains
- Coordinates: 41°9′34.57″N 73°51′40.57″W
- Built: 1872
- Architect: S. Marvin McCord
- Architectural style: Gothic Revival
- Part of: Downtown Ossining Historic District
- NRHP reference No.: 02001457
- Added to NRHP: July 22, 1982

Highland Cottage, also known as Squire House, is located on South Highland Avenue (U.S. Route 9) in Ossining, New York, United States. It was the first concrete house in Westchester County, built in the 1870s in the Gothic Revival architectural style. In 1982 it was listed on the National Register of Historic Places; almost 30 years later, it was added to the nearby Downtown Ossining Historic District as a contributing property.

Built by a prominent local man with an interest in new construction techniques, it has seen several different uses over the years. It was a sanitarium in the early 20th century, then a hospital and later a restaurant. For most of that century, the Squire family ran a local business school there. Since then it has returned to residential use.

== Building ==
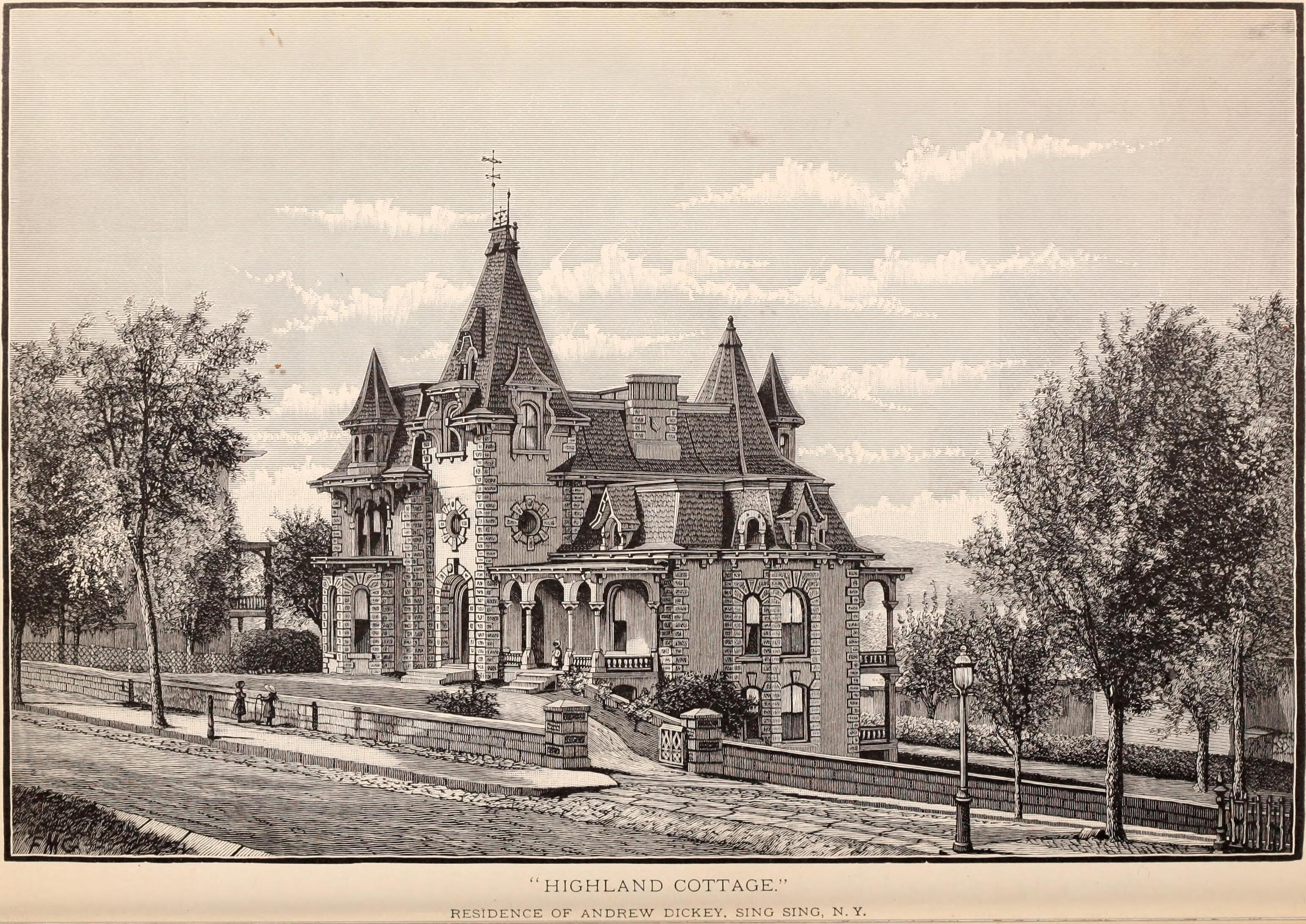
The house in the 1880s

The property is on the southwest corner of the intersection of South Highland and Maple Place, across the former from Ossining High School and the latter from the brick 1870 First Presbyterian Church designed by Isaac G. Perry. The historic district boundary currently runs in the middle of the streets between those buildings, both of which are contributing properties to the district, and the cottage. To the west are other houses; an apartment building is to the south. The lot slopes to the west, in the direction of the Hudson River.

The house itself is a two-story, three-bay structure of 18-inch–thick (46 cm) load-bearing precast concrete blocks faced in stucco. It is topped by a steep polychromatic hipped roof shingled in a fish-scale pattern. The northern bay of the main block rises to a peaked tower above the roof. A one-story northern wing has a mansard roof pierced by gabled dormer windows.

Bay windows project from all facades except the north. They have narrow round-arched one-over-one double-hung sash windows with stippled corners scored to give the appearance of quoins serving as surrounds, becoming segmental arches with projecting keystones; a fleur-de-lys carved from Sing Sing marble is on the front stone. Above them a bracketed cornice with broad eaves sets off the flat roof; on the second story they are echoed by a tripartite window with a projecting continuous stippled surround and otherwise similar treatment to the first-floor windows.

On the northern bay of the east (front) facade, from which the southern bay projects slightly, the main entrance is located in a recessed round-arched entryway with similar decoration as the windows; its keystone has a lion. Above it is an oculus with a shell on its projecting keystone. The north wing has a wooden balustraded porch and arches as well; behind it are round-arched two-over-two double-hung sash in quoined surrounds. The gabled dormers are steeply pitched; within them are small windows similar to those below.

Pendants support the brackets at the roofline cornice above the tripartite window; all the other brackets on that cornice are identical to those on the bay windows. Above the tripartite window an engaged turret rises. The lower of its two stages has round-arched one-over-one double-hung sash. Another bracketed cornice above it supports the flared, conical roof.

On the entrance tower, the roofline is continued with a section of concrete laid to appear as a slightly projecting flat course. The tower's roofline is broken by another double-hung two-over-two round-arched window flanked by mirroring brackets. Above its projecting cornice is a small jerkin-roofed one-over-one round-arched window. The top of the peak has an iron weathervane and some other decor.

The main entrance has a short set of steps and round-arched walnut double doors. The inside is paneled in dark oak, intricately molded. The floor is also oak, with alternating light and dark strips. All doors on the first floor are nine feet (2.7 m) high and echo the round-arched configuration of the entry doors, with brass hardware. Windows on the first and second floors have recesses for interior louvered shutters. The ceilings are of molded plaster, with some detailed medallions on the first floor. Around the house are seven stone fireplaces in different styles, with gold trim. The library's has a carved marble lion's head similar to that above the main entrance.

== History ==
Henry J. Baker, the builder and first occupant of Highland Cottage, bought the property in 1869. A successful New York City businessman who moved to Ossining, he had an interest in construction, having initiated the effort to build a new Methodist church in town. The local newspaper reported in March 1872 that he was going to build houses of "Swiss architecture" on his lots on Highland and Mott Street (as Maple Place was then known).

Concrete had been used to build American houses before, but only rarely, due to the abundance of wood and masonry. Since it was so unusual, English workers were brought over to build the house, which early on earned the disparaging local nickname of "Mud House". The concrete used for the precast blocks was Rosendale cement, made at what is now the Register-listed Snyder Estate Natural Cement Historic District in Rosendale, further north in the Hudson Valley. It would be the first concrete house in Westchester County, predating the better-known reinforced concrete Ward Castle in what is now Rye Brook by four years. The High Victorian Gothic style used was also an unusual choice for house.

Six years later, in 1878, Baker died. His estate took three years to sell. In 1881, the Dickey family gave it the name Highland Cottage when they moved in. Six years later, they moved. Their buyer, an elderly woman, lived there for a short time before selling in turn to a man named John Cockcroft.

Cockcroft lived in the house, without making any significant changes to it, for 17 years before selling it to Dr. Amos Squire in 1905. It would take his name as his family put it to a number of different uses over the course of the 20th century. Five years after moving in, Squire, then the head physician at nearby Sing Sing Prison, converted the first floor into Grandview Sanitarium, a mental hospital. In the years after World War I, Squire, a member of the state Naval Militia, used it as a hospital for injured sailors.

During the 1920s Squire's public service continued, as the village's health officer and a county medical examiner. In 1920 the ground floor became the Castle Inn restaurant, while the Squires retained their upstairs quarters. After the restaurant moved to other premises in 1923, the family took over the house again. When Dr. Squire assumed the medical examiner's position in 1925, his secretary needed to be able to accompany him on any emergency calls, so a basement apartment was constructed for the man and his wife to live there from 1936 to 1944.

After 1944, the space was rented out for medical offices. Dr. Squire died in 1949, leaving the house to his daughter, Evelyn Squire Culp, who had herself been born in the house 44 years earlier. Culp, a practicing lawyer and graduate of Columbia Business School, started the Squire School of Business in the house in 1952. She continued to teach office and secretarial skills there for 20 years, and tutored private pupils until 1984. That year she donated the house to the Westchester Preservation League. For the next 12 years it remained her residence. After she moved out in 1996, the league sold the house to a private owner, and so it has remained since.

== See also ==
- National Register of Historic Places listings in northern Westchester County, New York
