= William E. Ward House =

Historic house in Connecticut and New York, US

- U.S. National Register of Historic Places
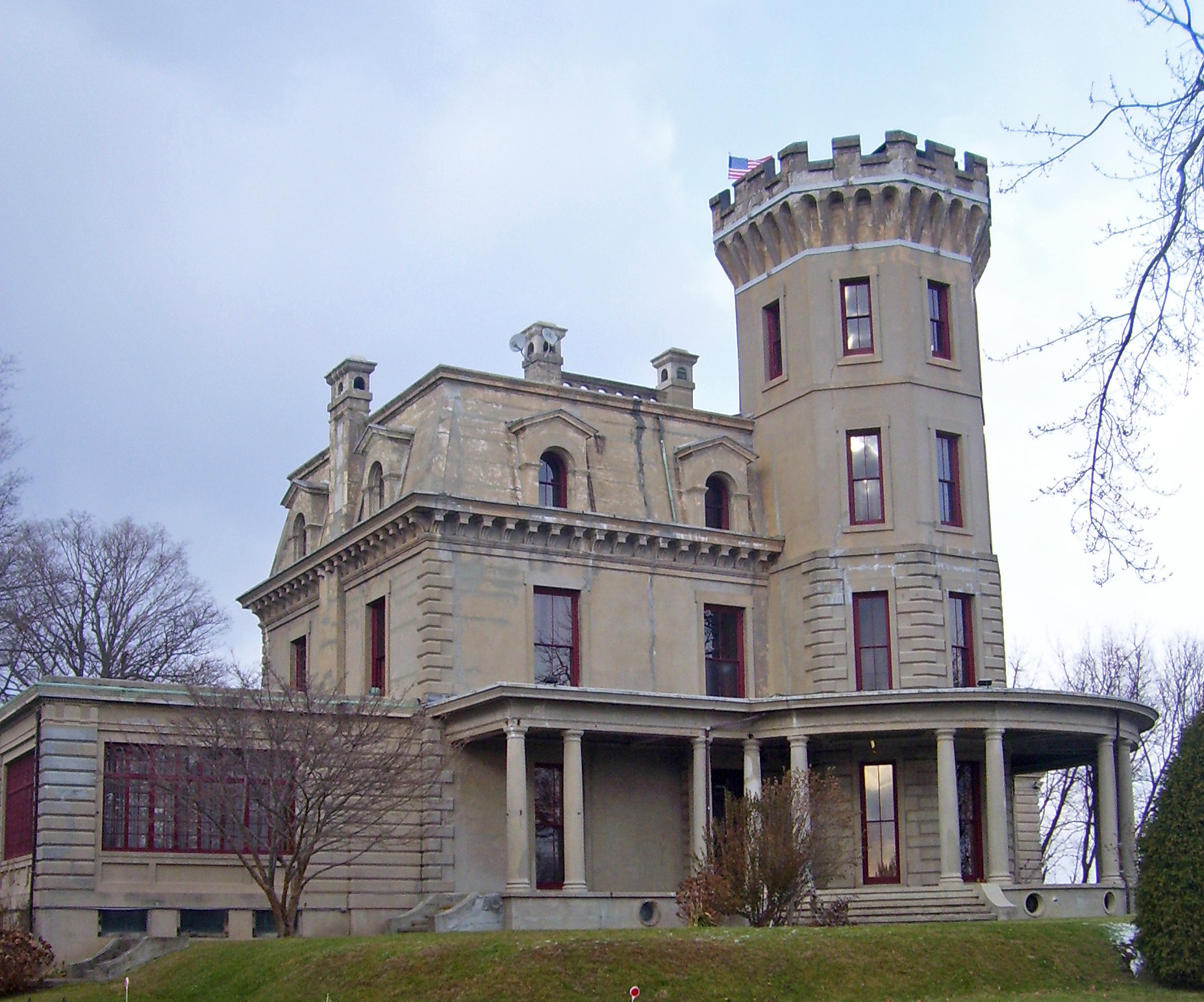
- South elevation and west profile, 2008
- Location: Rye Brook, NY; Greenwich, CT
- Nearest city: Rye, NY
- Coordinates: 41.0261°N 73.6672°W
- Area: 8 acres (3.2 ha)
- Built: 1873–76
- Architect: William E. Ward, Robert Mook
- Architectural style: Second Empire, Gothic Revival
- NRHP reference No.: 76001294
- Added to NRHP: November 7, 1976

The William E. Ward House, known locally as Ward's Castle, is located on Magnolia Drive, on the state line between Rye Brook, New York and Greenwich, Connecticut, United States. It is a reinforced concrete structure built in the 1870s.

Ward, a mechanical engineer, built the house with his friend Robert Mook to demonstrate the viability of the material for building. It is the first reinforced concrete building in the United States. It was later purchased by Mort Walker, creator of the comic strip Beetle Bailey, who used it to house the Museum of Cartoon Art from 1976 to 1992.

== Building ==
The house is located in a residential neighborhood a short distance from where state highway NY 120A leaves the state line for a southwesterly heading into downtown Port Chester. Most of the house's 8-acre (3.2 ha) lot is located on the Connecticut side of the state line, where it is open and slopes downward to the east and the Byram River. Because of this it is possible to see Long Island Sound from the house. A short driveway leads in from Magnolia Drive on the Rye Brook side.

The building itself is made entirely of reinforced concrete, from the foundation to the mansard roof that caps the two-story main block. Wood was used only for door and window frames. A four-story crenellated tower with decorative machicolation rises above the southeast corner. Like the house it has imitation quoins on the corners of its lower two stories. A one-story wing projects to the west.

A wraparound porch with round columns covers the south (front) elevation of the main block. The eastern two-thirds and tower are in Connecticut; the western third and wing are in New York. The mansard roof is pierced by classically inspired gabled dormer windows and two concrete chimneys; a third is on the west side. The roofline is marked by a modillioned cornice. On the north (rear) a two-story service wing connects to a water tower, stylistically similar to the house's tower. Another small wing projects from the east, overlooking the parking area.

The first floor has a central hallway with drawing room, reception room and dining room. A breakfast room and sun room are in the wing. Another central hall on the second floor leads to three bedrooms and a library with decorative woodwork in an Elizabethan mode. Above it is a similar floor with bedrooms and storage space.

The only other building on the property is the caretaker's cottage. It is a two-story frame house built in the late 19th century and located in a grove of trees to the north of the main house, in New York. The period landscaping on the property includes a variety of ornamental trees.

== History ==
Ward worked in collaboration with architect Robert Mook over three years to build the house. His goal was not only to build a house for himself, but that it be effectively fireproof. It was made entirely of Portland cement and light iron I-beams and rods, even in the roof. Wood was only used for door and window frames and their decorative trim. Ward's mother also had a fear of fire, which contributed to his desire to construct a fireproof residence.

Mook contributed a design in keeping with the tastes of the time. The main block and its mansard roof are in high Second Empire architectural style, and the more Gothic tower allows for panoramic views over Long Island Sound. The other tower is a water tower, meant to offer additional fire protection as well as a drinking supply. The architect and engineer left the concrete unfinished to better display it.

Architectural publications carried articles about the house as early as year before construction was finished. Its completion in 1876 prompted even longer articles, and mentions in overseas publications. Seven years later, in 1883, Ward presented his own paper on the house's construction to the American Society of Mechanical Engineers.

Sometimes called the first known reinforced concrete building in the United States (although the Coignet Building in Brooklyn, New York was completed over the winter of 1872-73) critics and scholars have recognized its importance since then, calling it "one of the most remarkable achievements of building art in the century" and "a technical tour de force". Ward's neighbors were less sure, calling it "Ward's Folly" at first, certain it would collapse or otherwise be ruined, but later calling it "Ward's Castle" when it survived. It has remained mostly unaltered, save for the two modern wings, ever since.

From 1976 until 1992 the unaltered castle housed the Museum of Cartoon Art established by Mort Walker two years earlier. Walker bought the dilapidated building for $60,000. He repaired the house and ran the museum with his family. It attracted up to 75,000 visitors per year.

The Ward House was listed on the National Register of Historic Places in 1976. The following year, the structure was jointly designated as a National Historic Civil and Concrete Engineering Landmark by the American Concrete Institute and the American Society of Civil Engineers.

== See also ==
- Highland Cottage, the county's first (nonreinforced) concrete building, in nearby Ossining
- National Register of Historic Places listings in Greenwich, Connecticut
- National Register of Historic Places listings in southern Westchester County, New York
- Rehoboth, a concrete dairy barn designed by Horace Greeley in the Westchester hamlet of Chappaqua in the 1860s.
- New York and Long Island Coignet Stone Company Building Ferro-concrete (Artificial Stone) building still standing in Gowanus, Brooklyn
