= Downtown Ossining Historic District =

Older core of village in Westchester County, New York

- U.S. National Register of Historic Places
- U.S. Historic district
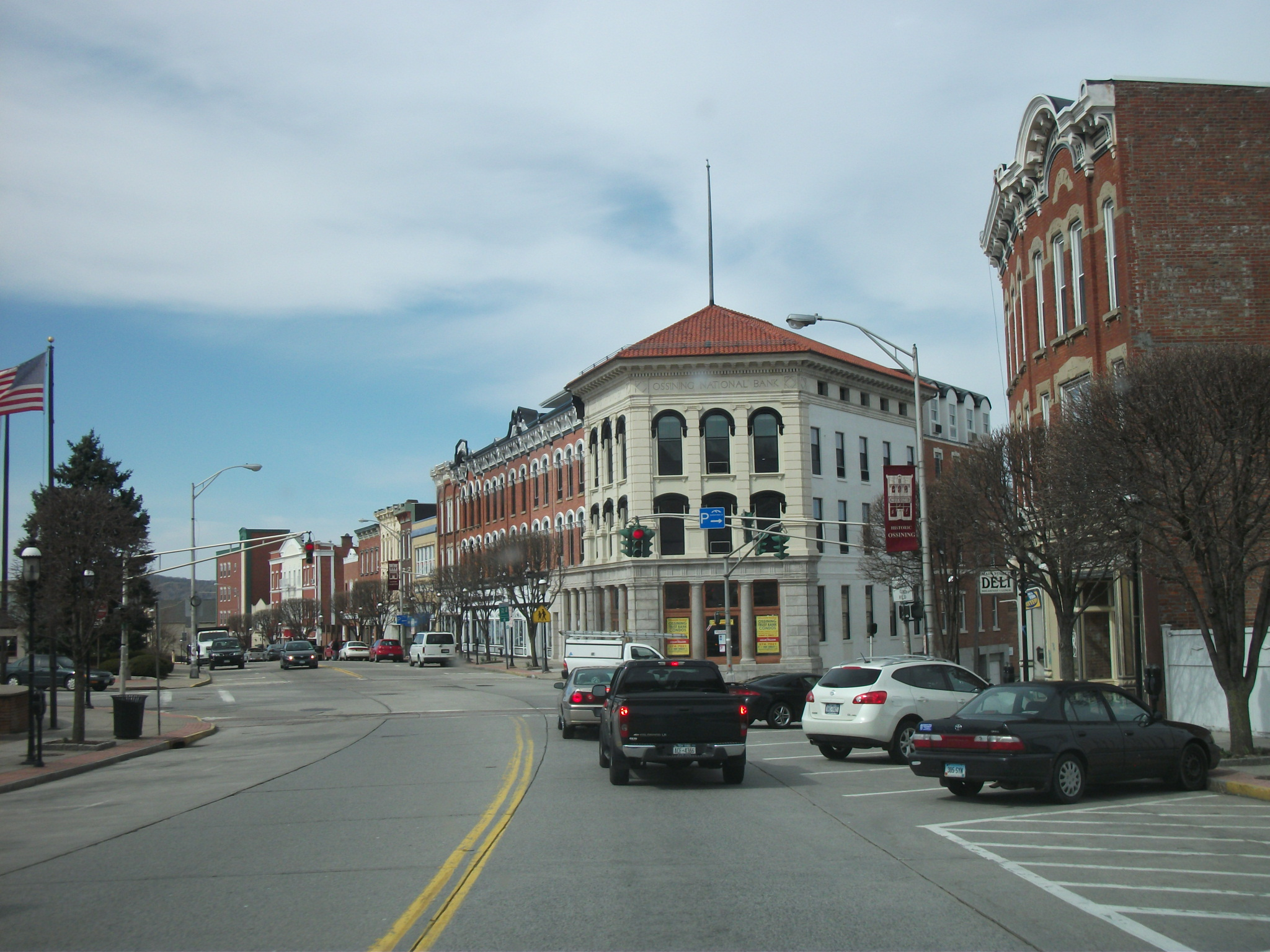
- 135 Main Street and buildings to west, 2010

- Location within New York Location within the United States
- Location: Ossining, New York
- Nearest city: White Plains
- Coordinates: 41°9′42″N 73°51′41″W
- Area: 25.8 acres (10.4 ha) (Note: The original nomination gives an area of 29 acres (12 ha).)
- Built: 1840–1933
- Architect: Multiple
- Architectural style: Renaissance, Italianate, Gothic Revival
- NRHP reference No.: 88001827 (original); 12001133 (increase)

Significant dates
- Added to NRHP: August 9, 1989
- Boundary increase: January 2, 2013

The Downtown Ossining Historic District is located at the central crossroads of Ossining, New York, United States, and the village's traditional business district known as the Crescent. Among its many late 19th- and early 20th-century commercial buildings are many of the village's major landmarks—three bank buildings, four churches, its village hall, former post office and high school. It was recognized as a historic district in 1989 and listed on the National Register of Historic Places, as one of the few downtowns in Westchester County with its social and historical development intact.

One of its contributing properties, the First Baptist Church of Ossining, was previously listed on the Register in 1973. The Old Croton Aqueduct, a portion of which passes through the district, was listed on the Register the following year and designated a National Historic Landmark in 1992. Among the architects represented in the district are Robert W. Gibson, Isaac G. Perry and James Gamble Rogers.

Ossining began developing at the crossroads in the late 18th century, and continued to prosper as industry, along with Sing Sing prison and the railroad, developed along the nearby shore of the Hudson River. It soon became Westchester's first incorporated village. The downtown area was fully developed by the mid-19th century, but two events later in the century reshaped it. The aqueduct was built through the area to carry water to New York City, requiring the demolition of some buildings. In the early 1870s several fires destroyed other buildings, thus most that remain date from that period to the early 1930s.

Later in the 20th century the buildings on the south side of Main Street were demolished as part of urban renewal efforts. Some of the oldest buildings on the other side were also lost in another fire. Little has been built to replace them, and the village has only recently begun serious redevelopment efforts although the area has become home to restaurants and home-furnishings stores that cater to the area's Latin American and Portuguese immigrant populations. A comprehensive plan adopted in the early 21st century has led to new zoning for the area meant to encourage mixed-use development. An expansion of the district to include Highland Cottage and some other buildings, also called for in the plan, was granted in 2013.

== Geography ==
The district is a 25.8-acre (10.4 ha) area shaped roughly like an upside down "Y". Its boundaries mostly follow property lines and street curbs. It is built around South Highland Avenue (U.S. Route 9), the main north–south through road, and Main Street, which leads west to the river.

At its northern end is 21–22 Croton Avenue, adjacent to the village municipal building along (New York State Route 133). It includes the bank building at the corner with South Highland and then crosses the street to follow the rear line of all the properties on Main Street, the area traditionally known as the Crescent due to the curve resulting from the area's topography. This takes it to the southwest, crossing the aqueduct trailway. At Brandreth Street it veers westward to take in the properties to 55 Central Avenue and, to their south, 107 Main Street.

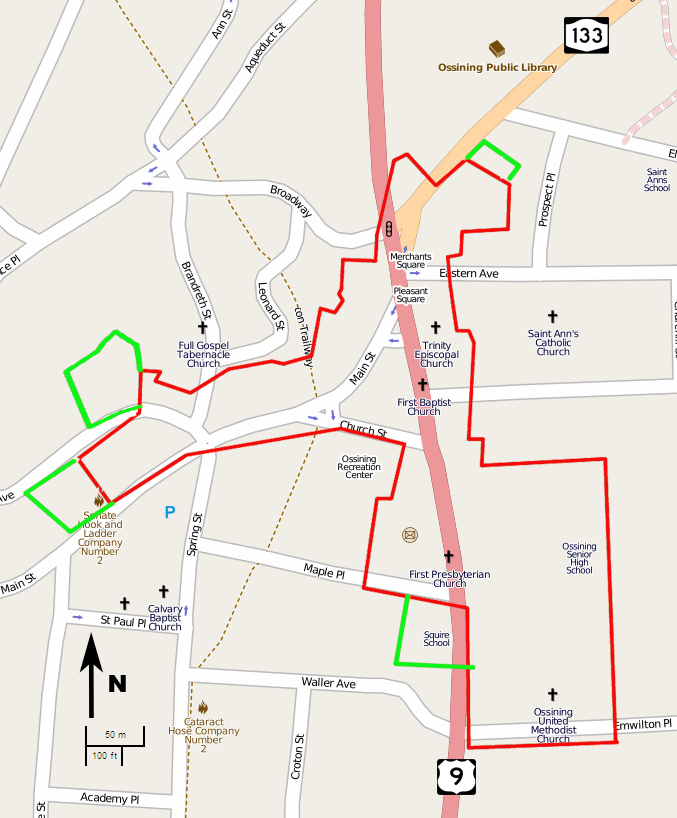
Map showing original district boundaries in red and 2013 additions in green

Then it returns eastward along Main, crossing the aqueduct again to the north side of Church Street. It turns south to follow the rear lines of the properties along South Highland, two commercial buildings and Trinity Episcopal Church, then returns to South Highland at Maple Place. It follows the east side of the road to Emwilton Place, where it turns east to include Ossining United Methodist Church. Past the church it turns north again to include all the buildings of Ossining High School while excluding its more modern athletic facilities. At the high school property's north boundary it turns west again to the rear lines of properties on South Highland, and follows them back to Village Hall.

The 37 buildings and structures within these boundaries are overwhelmingly commercial structures, usually brick buildings of two or three stories. The rest are institutional, either religious or governmental in use. All but 14 are considered contributing properties.

Within the district the land slopes slightly to the north and west, anticipating steeper drops of almost 100 feet (30 m) to the Sing Sing Kill gorge and Hudson. As a result of its proximity to these bluffs the district has a view across the Hudson. To the east and south are the residential neighborhoods of Ossining; in 2013 the district boundary was expanded to include Highland Cottage, also listed on the Register.

The village's 2009 comprehensive plan called for expanding the historic district boundaries, at least for local purposes. Four small areas were proposed for inclusion: the additional properties on Central Avenue, a westward expansion along Main Street, Highland Cottage and the building to the east of the municipal building on Croton Avenue at the northeast corner of the district. These areas were added to the district by the U.S. National Park Service in 2013.

== History ==
The development of downtown Ossining has several distinct stages. In the early preindustrial period, it was primarily a crossroads. Most of the district's buildings, including the four churches, were built and rebuilt along Main Street in the late 19th century. New construction shifted back to Highland Avenue in the early 20th century and gave the district its important public buildings. Since then the community's focus has been devoted to preserving and redeveloping those buildings.

=== 1680s: Formation of the town ===
Frederick Philipse bought the area which presently constitutes the Town of Ossining from the Sint Sinck Native American tribe in 1685. His Manor extended from Spuyten Duyvil Creek on the border between present day Manhattan and the Bronx to the Croton River. The last Lord of the Manor, Frederick III, a Loyalist in the American Revolutionary War, fled to England afterwards, so the state of New York seized the manor in 1779.

=== 1780s–1840s: Crossroads and port ===
When the vast Philipse family landholdings in today's Westchester and Putnam counties were confiscated by the state of New York they were divided among new owners. Elijah Hunter, a Continental Army officer and later a secret agent during the war, bought the tract just south of Sing Sing Kill. He also started holding prayer meetings at his and other settlers' houses; the group formally became the First Baptist Church in 1790.

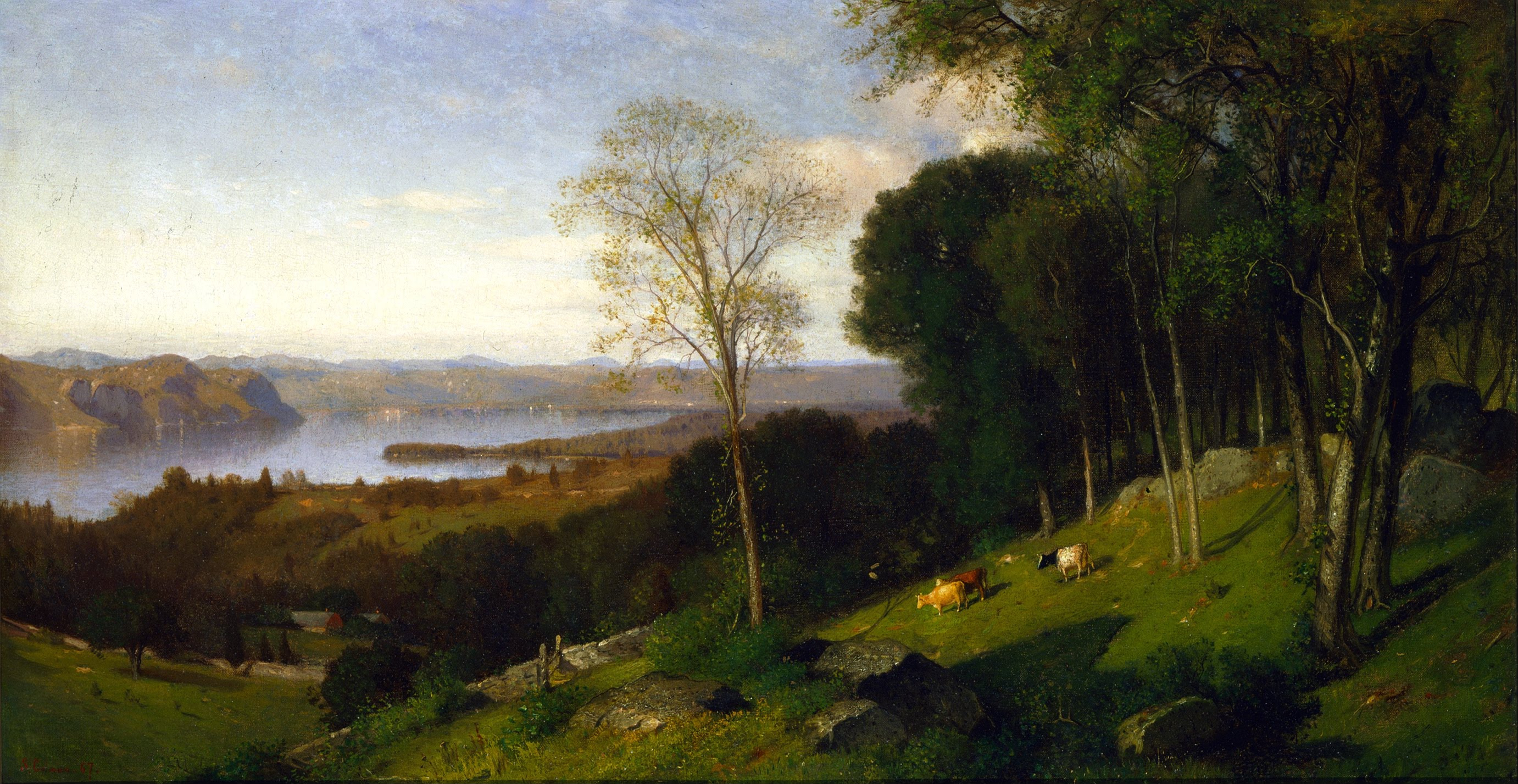
Looking North from Ossining, an 1867 Samuel Colman painting

The river shoreline became the hub of early development. Produce from farms inland was brought there to be shipped to New York City via what is now Main Street, which connected to the Albany Post Road, now US 9. To open the port to even more farmers, the Croton Turnpike (now NY 133) was built early in the 19th century.

Settlement and development began to concentrate around the crossroads. The Union Hotel, just north of the Croton Turnpike, became the travelers' stop identified with Ossining. The local Presbyterian congregation built its first meetinghouse at the present site of Trinity Episcopal Church in 1803. By 1813 it became Sing Sing, Westchester's first incorporated village. The First Baptist Church built its first building at its current site in 1815. In 1820, a relocation of the Post Road a thousand feet (305 m) to the east benefited the new village at the expense of Sparta, the unincorporated hamlet a mile (1.6 km) to the south, since Sparta was no longer on the road while Sing Sing and the Union Hotel still were. Five years later, the local economy was further bolstered when the state built Sing Sing, one of its first prisons, on the river just to the southwest of the village. Marble quarried by convicts was used to build not only the prison but several other buildings in the area, including Ossining's oldest church, St. Paul's, now Calvary Episcopal Church, downtown outside the historic district, and elsewhere, such as the steps of the state capitol and New York City Hall.

The churches grew with the village. In 1834, the Baptist church was renovated, and the Presbyterians built a new Greek Revival church. Many of the commercial buildings in that style along Main Street west of the crossroads were demolished when the Croton Aqueduct, a masonry tunnel, was built in 1839 to connect Croton Dam with the reservoirs in Central Park. The buildings in that style at 151–155 Main Street, built afterwards further east, survived and were the oldest buildings in the district when it was established, but are no longer extant. Only the clapboard Italianate house at 23 South Highland, one of the few residences in the district and now its oldest building, survives from the pre-Civil War period. (Note: Mistakenly identified in the source as 28 South Highland Avenue, a nonexistent address)

=== 1840s–1870: The railroad comes to Ossining ===
In the middle of the century, the Hudson River Railroad was built along the shoreline. With the village now within an hour's ride of New York City, its population grew over 50 percent between 1845 and 1855. The railroad's effects on the economy were both beneficial and detrimental. It enhanced the agricultural business through the crossroads, and spurred development of industry at the waterfront such as Benjamin Brandreth's pill factory. Industries that had been a source of Ossining's early growth, such as boatbuilding on the riverside and transportation-related businesses like hotels along Albany Post Road, suffered. In 1850, the First National Bank built its first building at the site occupied by its successor at South Highland and Croton.

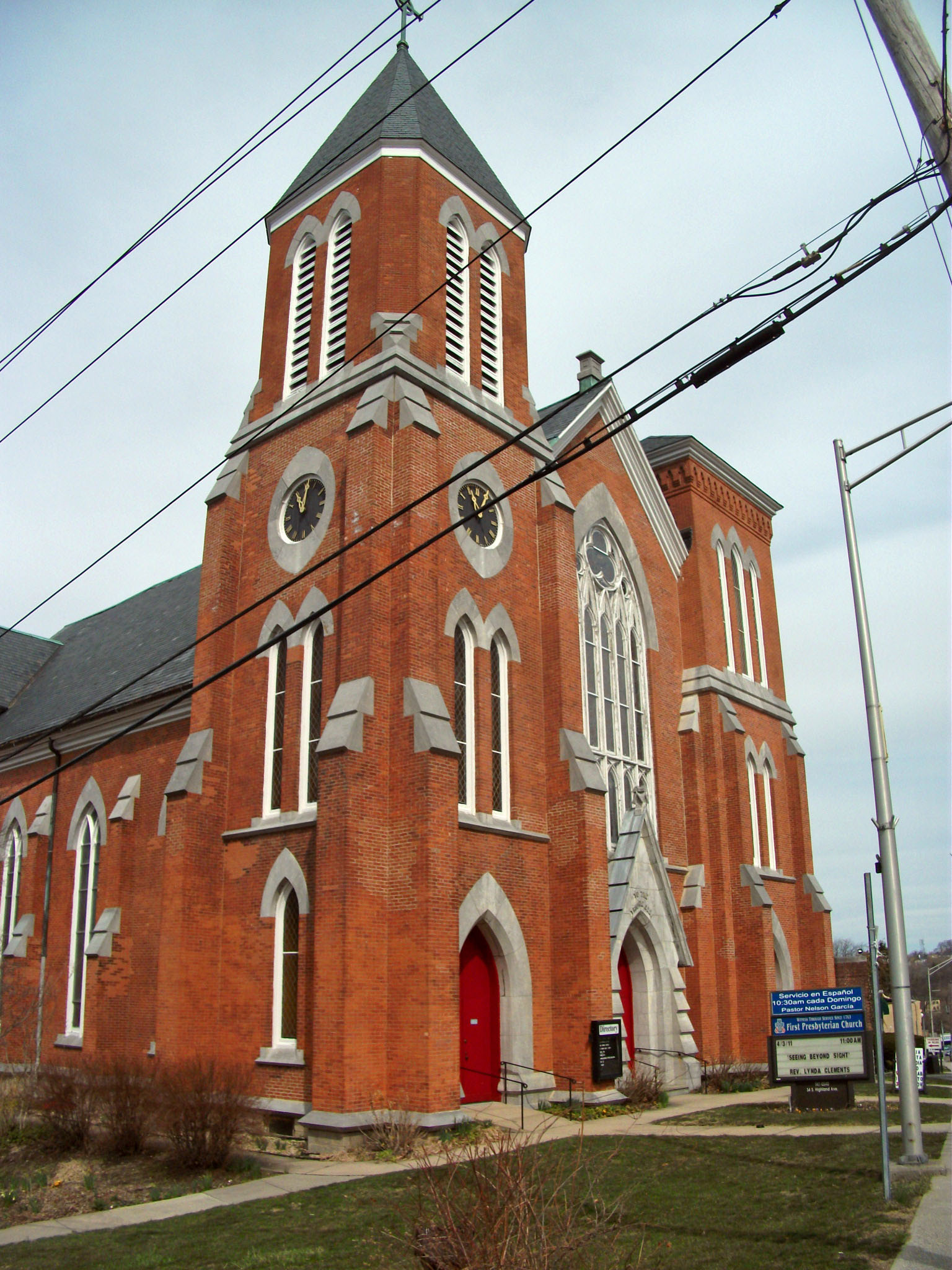
Isaac Perry's First Presbyterian Church, 34 South Highland Avenue

Little new construction took place during the 1860s, due to the war and its aftermath. The Second Empire Olive Opera House at 63-67 Central Avenue, built around 1865, remains the district's oldest non-residential property. Croton Avenue saw some development at that time, particularly the rowhouses at 4 and the commercial building at 12. On Main Street the buildings between 157 and 161 also date from this time, but those that remain have been altered enough to no longer be contributing. The building at 121 Main Street, built around 1865, retains enough integrity to contribute. After the war, the village built a monument at South Highland and Croton to the 42 men who had been killed in action with the Union Army. (Note: The original 1879 monument featured a statue of a kneeling angel; it was replaced with the current soldier statue eight years later.)

=== 1870–1910: Industrial prosperity ===
The postwar years, the period later referred to as the Gilded Age, were prosperous for Ossining. While shipbuilding and river shipping finally faded as an industry when the railroad, now part of the New York Central, was fully established, quarrying continued. The village had become an industrial center, with over a hundred small businesses located downtown or on the waterfront, from Brandreth's pill factory to pickle and sleigh manufacturers.

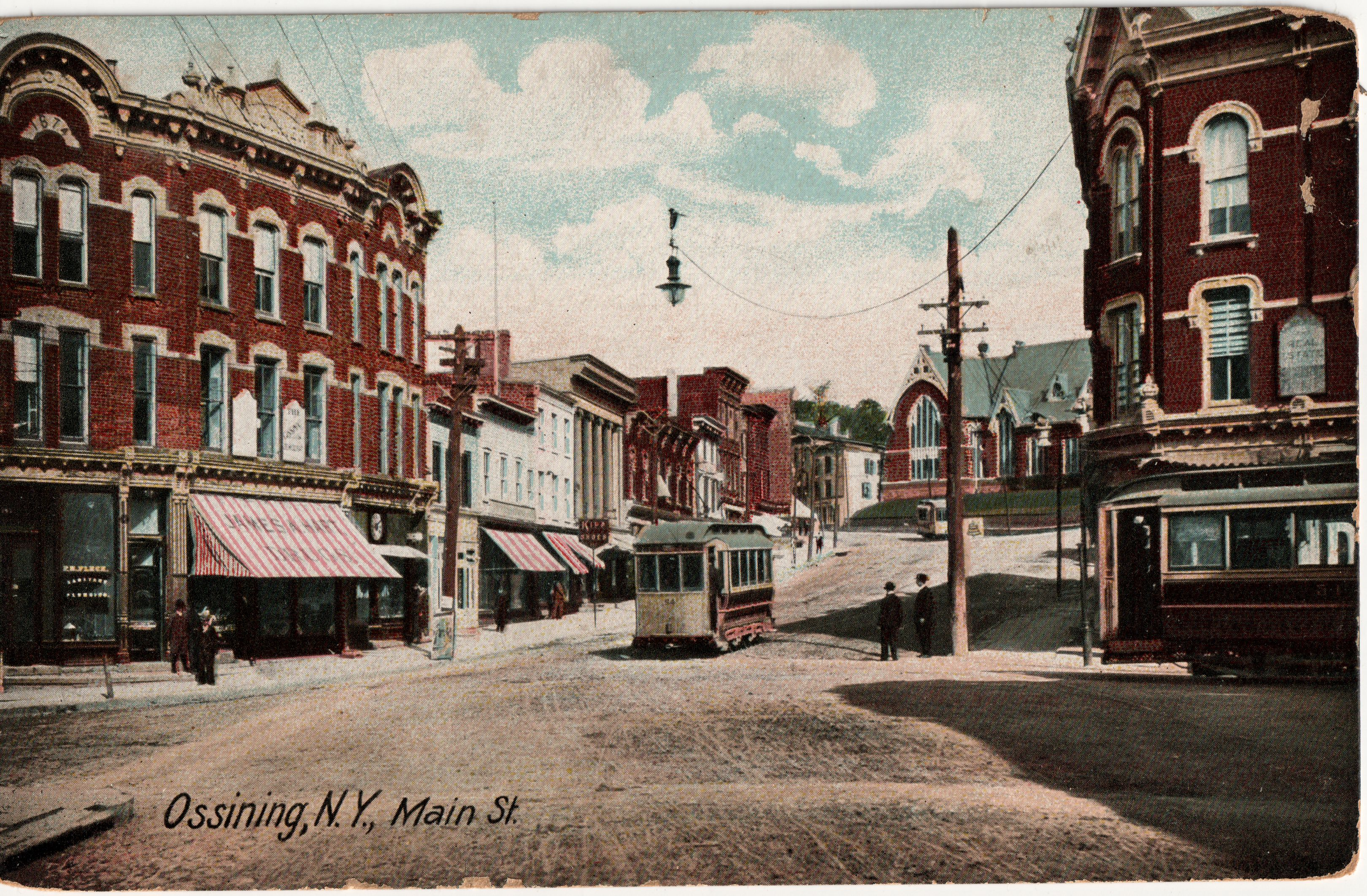
Main Street in Ossining, New York in the early 20th century

Near the end of that decade the church congregations decided to expand. The Presbyterians needed a larger building. They sold the old one to the new Trinity Episcopal Church, who had split from nearby St. Paul's over differences of opinion about the war. The lot at the Maple Place intersection was ideal for their new building designed by Isaac Perry, later New York's state architect. The stone-trimmed brick structure has design features common to Perry's other churches, all designed during this period.

It was the first of four churches built in downtown Ossining in the late 19th century. The other buildings in the district were primarily built in the wake of four fires. The first, in 1871, primarily affected the corner of the Post Road and Broadway (then called Mill Street) to the north of the district. Its primary casualty was 217 Main Street, rebuilt in brick instead of frame later that year; the village's records, all stored in the basement, were lost. In 1872, the next fire destroyed all the buildings on lower Main Street. In its wake, the Barlow family, who had operated a hardware and furniture business in the original building since 1844, built the block named for them at 129–139 Main Street, retaining the original's bracketed cornice and adding pediments. The Barlows intended for it to be the central commercial location in Ossining.

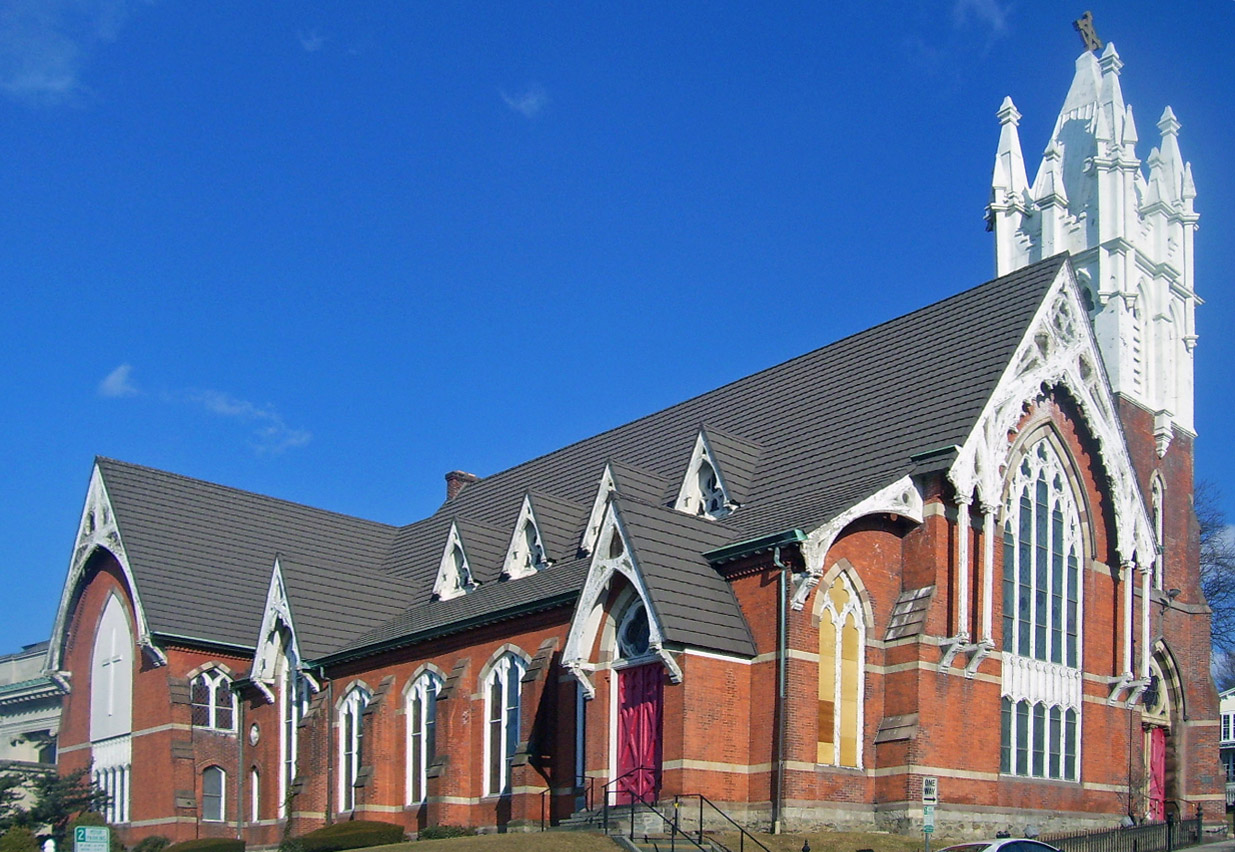
The 1874 First Baptist Church, 1 Church Street

In 1874, another fire started in the Olive Opera House at Brandreth and Central, seriously damaging it and the neighboring buildings. In the subsequent rebuilding, 145 Main Street was redone in the Renaissance Revival style, with bracketed cornices and pediments and stone trim. On the other side, 61 Central retained its cast iron storefront with columns on high plinth blocks, the only example of that design element in the district.

Further up the street, 187 Main was built in 1874 as well, featuring splayed brick lintels in addition to its bracketed cornice. Across the street, the Baptists replaced the twice-renovated Greek Revival frame church where they had worshipped since 1815. Brooklyn architect J. Walsh's brick Gothic Revival design is one of the highest applications of that style in Ossining.

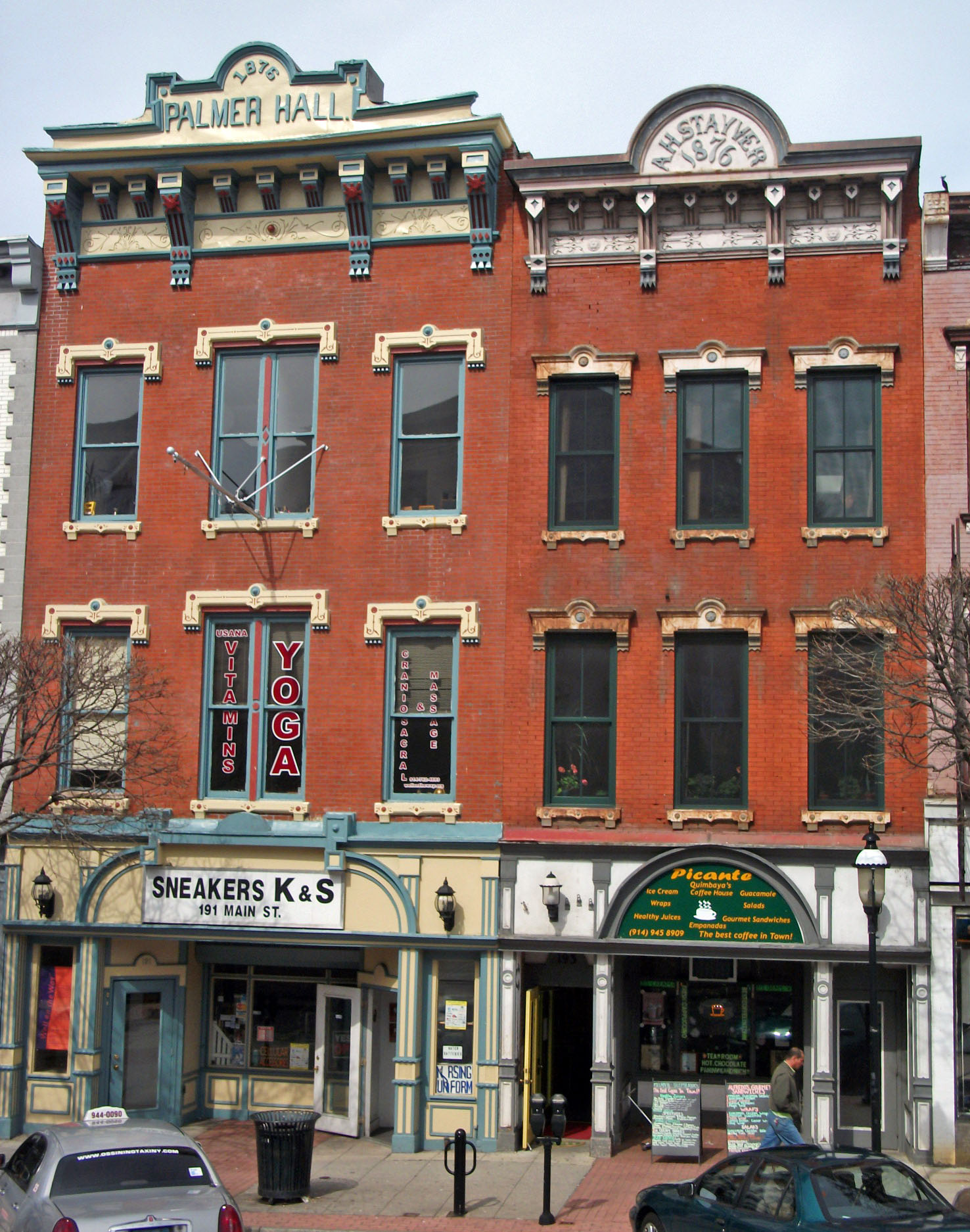
Palmer Hall and Stayver Building, 191 and 193 Main Street

The last fire, in 1876, burned that block across Main from the Baptist Church, an area the previous fires and the aqueduct construction had left untouched. Again, the rebuilding provided a chance to apply newer architectural styles. The buildings at 191 and 193 Main became Palmer Hall and the Stayver Building, brick structures with Neo-Grec detailing in their metal trim. Italianate detail was added to 199 Main Street, which became the Keenan Building when it was finished in 1878.

In the 1880s, the space left vacant next to the aqueduct along the north side of Main was refilled by 165 and 173–75 Main. Both have since been modified but retain their original metal cornices and segmental-arched lintels. Further east, another Renaissance Revival building, 127 Main Street, was completed in 1885. Its elaborate detail includes two-story brick pilasters supporting a metal roof cornice, and an intermediate cornice supported by cast iron pillars.

That same year the Methodists, who had previously held services in a building on Spring Street, outside the district, finished their new church. That building, at the corner of Highland and Emwilton, was designed by Ebenezer Roberts, architect of several Manhattan churches, and Lawrence P. Valk. The Ossining Methodist church is distinct from Roberts' earlier, more Gothic, churches (all subsequently demolished). Polychrome bands of stone on the exterior, and more elaborate detailing, put it within the High Victorian Gothic style. It features an engaged corner tower and transitional Queen Anne and Shingle Style elements. Louis Comfort Tiffany signed one of the Favrile glass windows he designed for the interior.

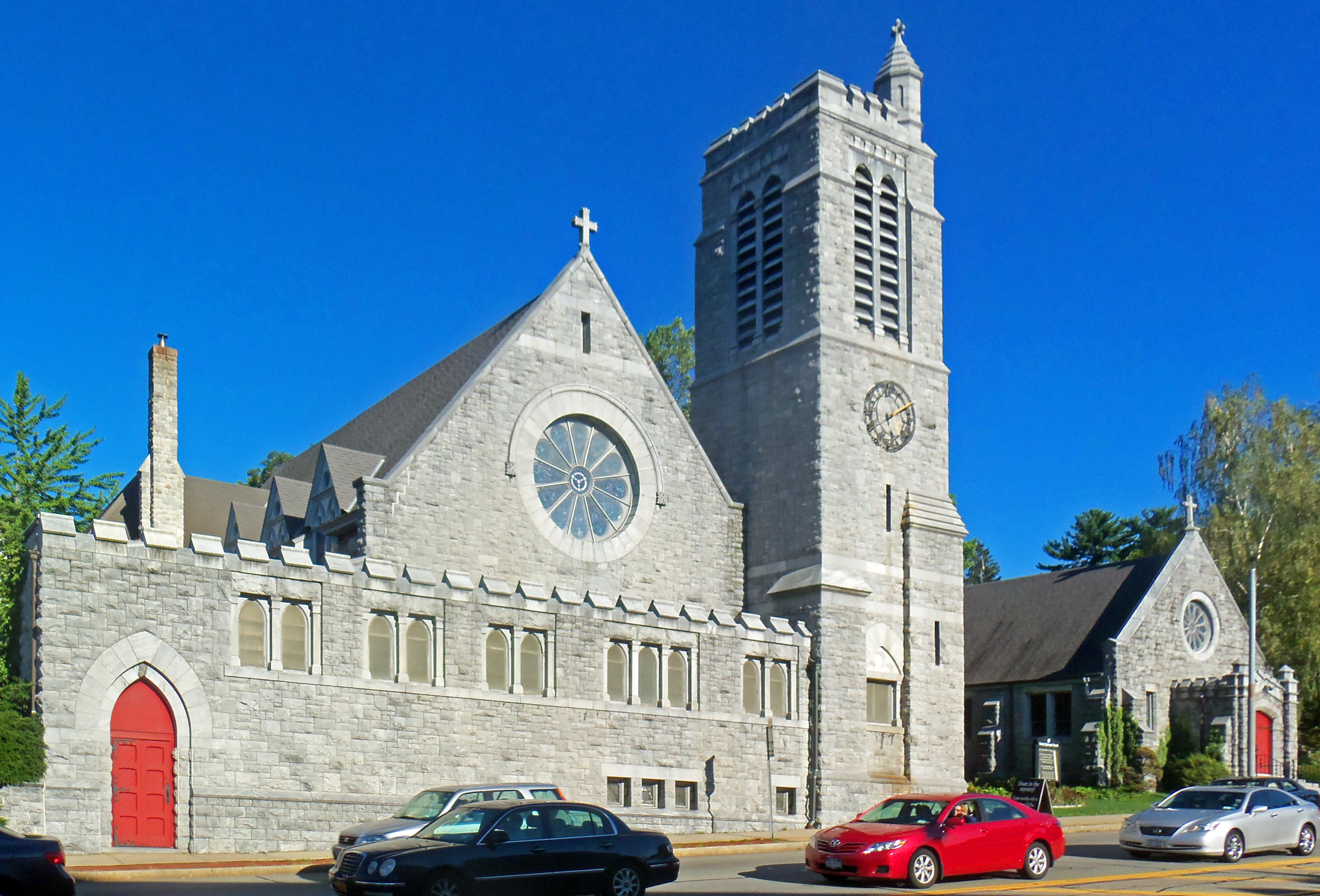
Trinity Episcopal Church, 7 South Highland Avenue

The last of the downtown churches was Trinity. After almost two decades in the Presbyterians' former building, the breakaway Episcopalian congregation needed its own new building. It commissioned Robert W. Gibson, whose design was the fifth in a series of English Gothic churches he began in 1884 with Albany's All Saints Cathedral. Trinity has elements in common with the other churches in the series, such as its mix of materials and large rose window, but is unique among them for its U shape, the result of a later expansion. It was completed in 1891, the only Neo-Gothic Revival religious building in the district.

At the beginning of the next decade, another longstanding building from the early years of Ossining, the Union Hotel at South Highland and Church Street, was demolished. A Romanesque Revival doctor's office building replaced it. In 1892 the corner section of the Barlow Block was separated internally from the rest of the building so it could serve as Ossining's post office, the first of two former locations for that facility within the district. The next year the village's electric trolley system was established, with its main line going down Croton Avenue from the then-undeveloped Ossining Heights area in the northeast corner of the village to Main Street, where a spur ran down to Sparta, and then continuing to the train station. Residents could more easily travel downtown, and Ossining Heights soon became the suburban residential area it is today.

The new century brought some major changes to the village, starting with its name. In 1901, it formally changed its name from Sing Sing to Ossining to distance itself from the prison. Residents had come to resent the prison industries' competitive advantages and the prison itself was now associated with the electric chair. Sparta, long bypassed by the region's major transportation arteries, was finally annexed by the village in 1906.

In architecture, the Renaissance Revival style was used for another commercial building, 181–183 Main Street, around 1900. In 1905, the parish hall and cloister were added to Trinity, giving its distinctive U-shaped layout. The next year the corner section of the Barlow Block was remodeled by W.H. Rahman for use by a bank in a higher version of the style. It was refaced in stone, with Doric and Ionic pilasters, terra cotta detailing and full entablature leading up to a tile roof, meant to emulate St. Mark's Library in Venice.

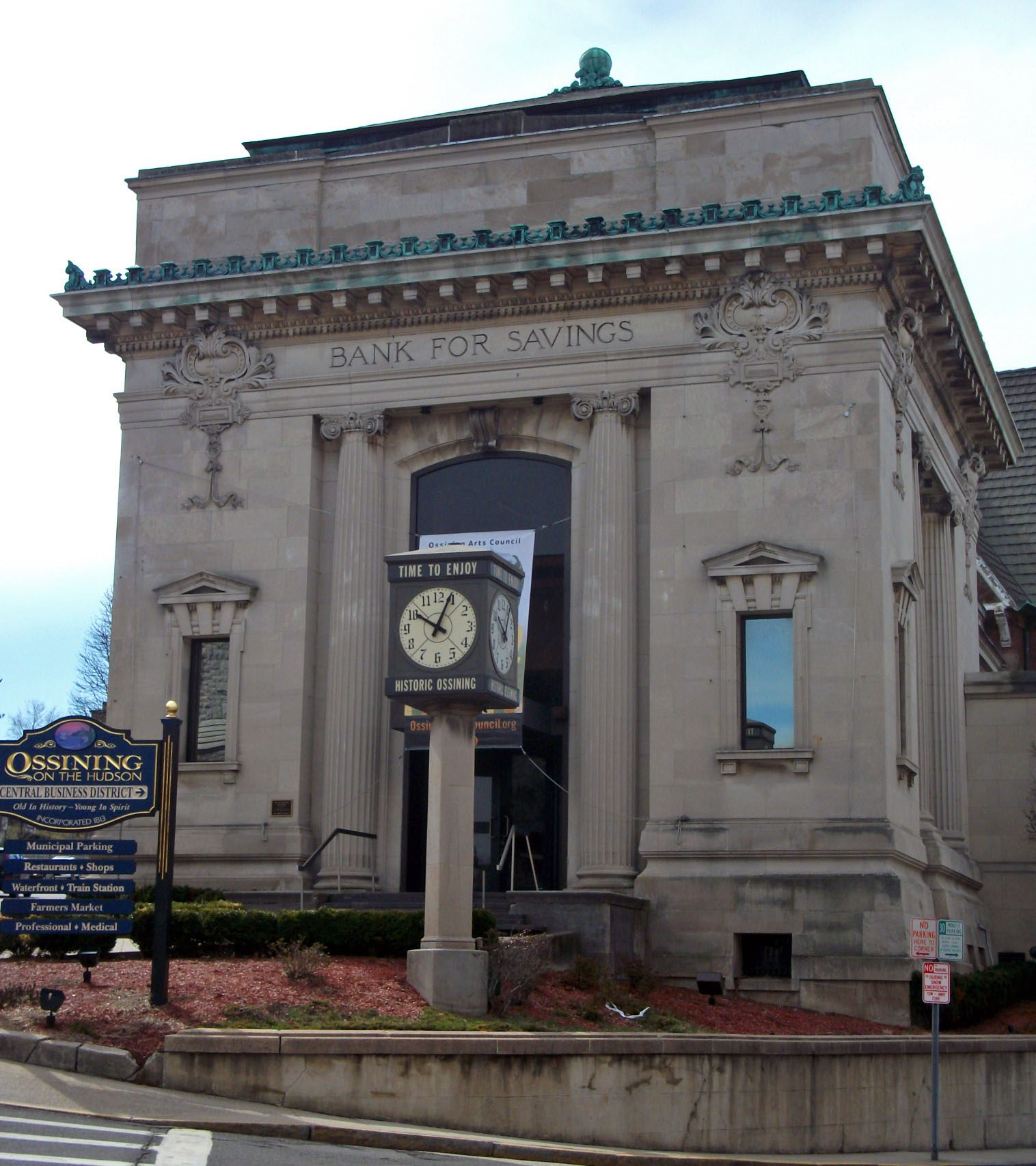
Bank for Savings building, 200 Main Street

It anticipated the first significant building of the new century, the Bank for Savings Building at 200 Main Street, built the next year on the north corner of the triangular lot occupied by the First Baptist Church for nearly a century. The stone building by Lansing C. Holden, a past president of the New York chapter of the American Institute of Architects, is the only example in the village of the Beaux-Arts style. Its classical detailing makes it a focal point for traffic entering Ossining from the north, even as the intersection has become of one of Westchester's busiest.

=== 1910–1933: Public buildings ===
Other new construction continued in previously established styles. In 1911 and 1913 respectively, new brick commercial buildings went up at 189 and 205 Main in the Renaissance Revival style. Their application differed from those that had gone before. On 189 was a belt course and stone quoins; on the other building all the decoration, including the flat-arched lintels and corbeled cornice, was brick.

In 1914, the bank buildings were complemented by the village's own new municipal building. The stone edifice at 16–20 Croton Avenue, the northern end of the district, was in the Classical Revival mode common for most governmental buildings of the era. The upper floors were initially used as a school. It is the only Westchester building by Donn Barber, designer of the Connecticut State Library and the first American admitted to the French Society of Beaux-Arts architects.

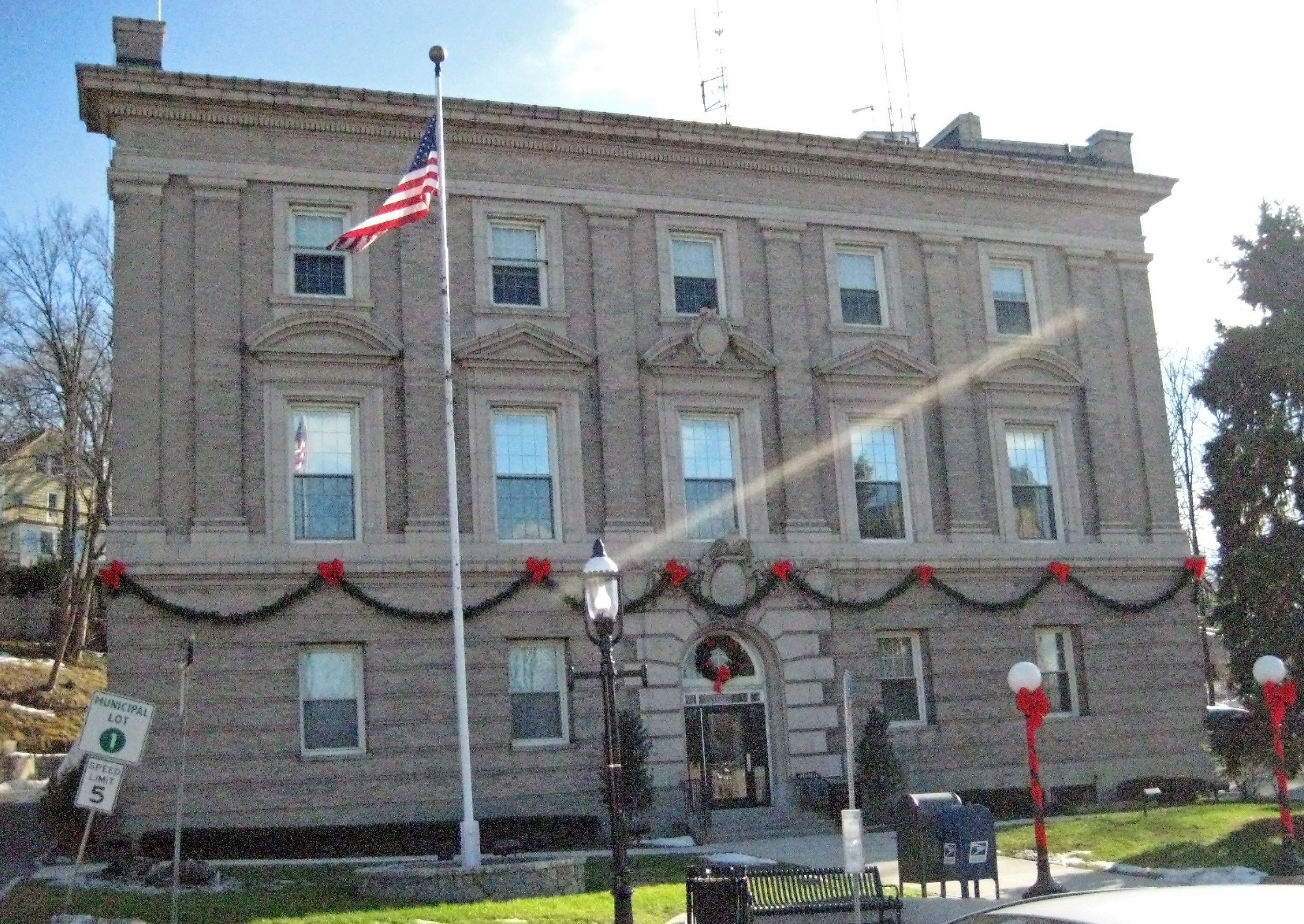
Village Hall, 16 Croton Avenue

Later that year another new architectural style was introduced to the district. The Spanish Colonial Revival commercial building at 201–203 Main Street used a tiled pent-roofed parapet and stucco face. Down the street at 125 Main, a 1920 building is the district's only example of a yellow brick building with limestone trim, in the form of a stone cornice topped with a parapet.

The early 1920s brought changes to Ossinging as the village's population reached 12,000, many moving into former farms newly subdivided into suburban residential neighborhoods on the village's outskirts. In 1920, a new warden at the prison shut down several prison industries, including the quarry. Two years later, the Olive Opera House closed after almost 60 years. It was soon converted into a small factory. Two years after that, in 1924, the trolley system was shut down and dismantled, as more residents owned cars and more of the roads were paved. Bus service replaced it.

The last significant buildings in the future historic district came to South Highland at the end of the decade. On the corner just south of the First Baptist Church, the Cynthard Building, a single-story commercial block faced in terra cotta topped by a polychrome parapet, was erected in 1930; the Romanesque Revival doctor's office that had replaced the Union Hotel in 1890, and a house to the south, were demolished. Also that year, the third and last bank building downtown was built at 13 Croton Avenue, the corner with North Highland. The First National Bank, which had occupied the spot since 1880, moved into the district's only Art Deco building. It has an unusual neoclassical door surround.

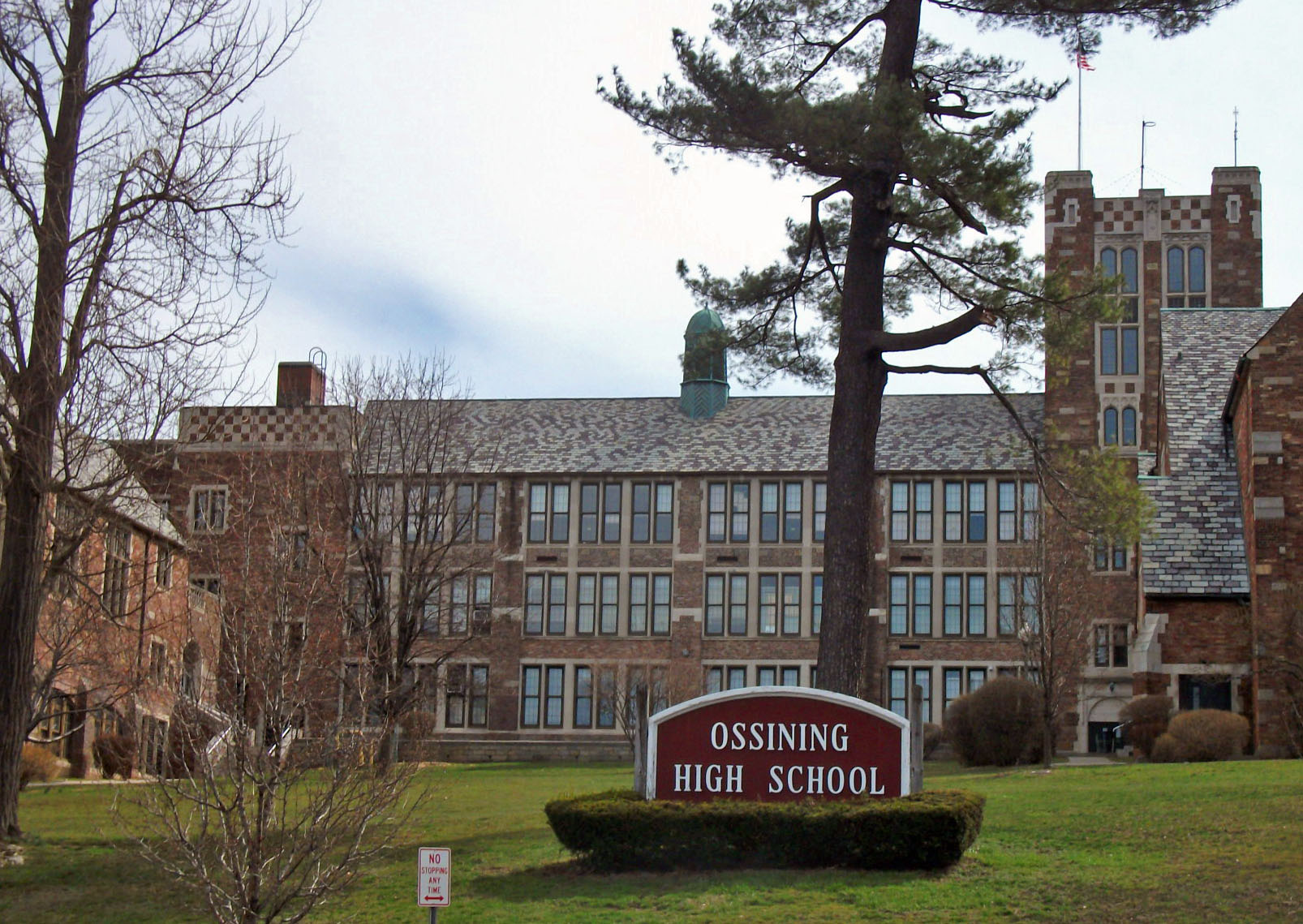
Ossining High School, 29 South Highland Avenue

Ossining High School was that year's most distinguished addition. Washington School, the village's high school since 1907, was becoming inadequate for the growing student population. After several attempts, voters in 1929 approved a new building when a nearby private school made a donation that helped cover the $750,000 ($11.2 million in 2025) construction cost. The new high school was on the site of Careswell, formerly the estate of Henry Baker, the local financier who had helped fund the Methodist church. James Gamble Rogers was the architect. Known for his many buildings on college campuses, the village's high school was one of his few secondary school buildings, and the only public school. The Collegiate Gothic building, taking up the large area of South Highland's west side between the houses and the Methodist church, has some similarities to Harkness Tower at Yale University, also designed by Rogers and considered one of the best examples of that style.

=== 1934–present: Preservation, urban renewal and redevelopment ===
As the Great Depression set in and construction slowed, one more public building completed the district. The post office had outgrown its space at the Barlow Block again, and needed to move. As part of the national relief programs, many new post offices were built. Arthur Ware contributed a restrained Classical Revival one-story brick building at 10 South Highland, between the Cynthard Building and the Presbyterian Church, on the site of what had been the last remaining house on the west side of Main in the district. It was completed in 1933, the newest contributing property in the district.

The district had been built out, but change continued. Woolworth's moved into the space at 201–203 Main in 1934. The government of the Town of Ossining, which surrounds the village on land, moved into Village Hall the next year.

Postwar population growth led to the expansion of two buildings in the late 1950s. The first was the Presbyterian Church, which received a new Sunday School wing in 1955. Two years later the high school across the street, serving more students than it was originally designed for since 1937, followed. Its new wing, completed in 1957, was first used for the junior high school students. (Note: Since that time a separate junior high school has been built; the entire building is used by the high school) It was built of brick and intended to be architecturally sympathetic.

Most significantly, later in the decade the aqueduct began to carry less water. New York City had both eliminated one of the two reservoirs in Central Park that it fed, and developed or planned to develop new reservoirs in the Catskills and further up the Croton River watershed, so it needed less water from the Croton aqueduct. In the early 1950s the city finally stopped using it; some of the communities along the aqueduct kept drawing water from it until 1965.

Automobiles had displaced the railroad as the most common means of transport. Parkways and other dedicated roads had been built from the city in all directions. One proposal, made in the late 1920s, called for a Hudson River Expressway to run along the river's eastern shore, paralleling the railroad, from The Bronx to Beacon, including through downtown Ossining. Governor Nelson Rockefeller, whose ancestral estate Kykuit would have been along the route, introduced a shortened version in 1958, a Tarrytown-Beacon Interstate 487. After intense local opposition, he canceled the plan in 1971. The urban renewal funds meant to offset the disruption it would have caused were still available to affected communities.

Like many other established downtowns, Ossining had been adversely affected by the growth of the automobile in the later 20th century. Local shoppers began taking advantage of improved roads to patronize stores in both enclosed shopping malls and strip malls along major highways like Route 9, outside the village's traditional center. The village used its urban renewal grants to demolish the old buildings along the south side of Main Street that year in an attempt to revitalize downtown. Its comprehensive plan drafted but never adopted two years earlier called for mixed-use development projects to replace them. But they were never funded or undertaken, and the spaces were largely used as parking. It was the first of many plans that remained largely unrealized, as Ossining went through 15 different mayoral administrations in the remaining years of the 20th century. During the 1968–74 period, downtown was also the site of several race riots that began at the high school and spilled into the streets. The community responded by redistricting its schools to ensure racial integration in lower grades.

The 1971 plan had recognized the importance of the buildings on the north side of Main, and historic preservation soon played a larger role in downtown planning. In 1973, the First Baptist Church became Ossining's first listing on the National Register of Historic Places, and the aqueduct followed the next year. In 1975, the village followed up with a study of the prospects for rehabilitating and preserving downtown that, for the first time in its planning history, drew on community input. It recommended residential development downtown to sustain the businesses that remained, but no new projects were undertaken. A second plan two years later also failed, but made specific recommendations for preserving historic buildings and called for new development to be on the same scale, rather than the larger structures proposed at the beginning of the decade.

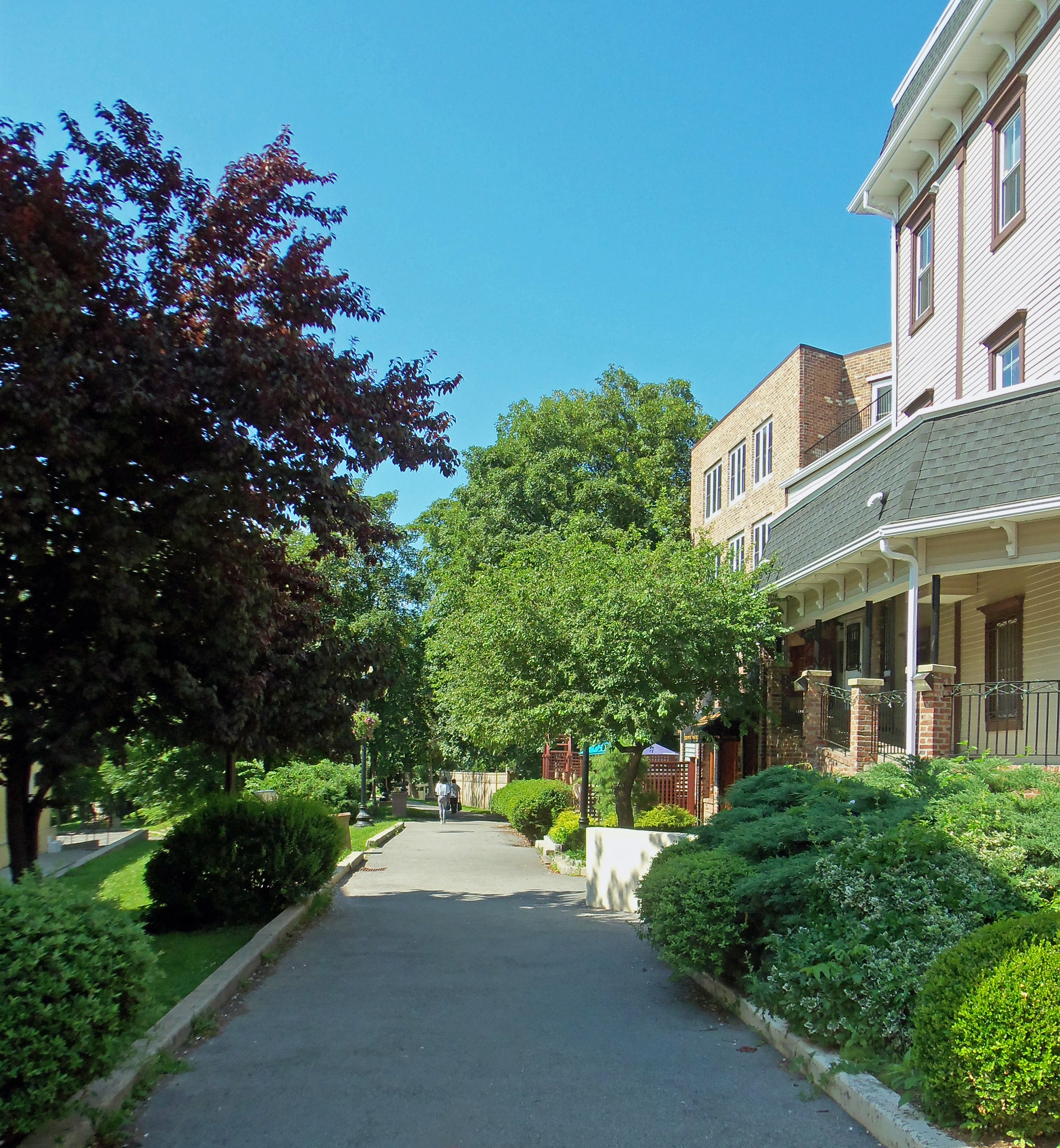
The aqueduct walkway

As the village continued to change governments, the social and economic trends affecting downtown continued. All three bank buildings were left vacant. The preeminence of automobiles and roads took a direct toll on the district when a widening of Route 9 cost 217 Main Street several of its bays. It was rebuilt with its overall appearance retained, but the project cost it enough of its historic character that it could no longer be considered contributing when the district, originally called the Main Street Crescent Historic District, was created in 1989. Many businesses that closed or moved out were replaced by new ones, particularly restaurants, that catered to a growing Latin immigrant (at the time, largely Ecuadorean) population that had settled in the neighborhoods nearby.

In the 1990s, the village, under its first stable administration in several decades, began the planning process again, focusing on both downtown and the waterfront. Its second attempt at a farmers' market downtown had begun in 1990 and continues. Extensive public involvement led to the implementation of ideas from earlier plans, such as design guidelines for the district and a Historic Review Commission to enforce them. The new plan recognized the importance of the growing restaurant cluster downtown. In 1992, the aqueduct gained National Historic Landmark status, and the following year the 1840s Greek Revival buildings at 147–55 Main Street burned, creating a new void for redevelopment; the village initially used the space as a parking lot.

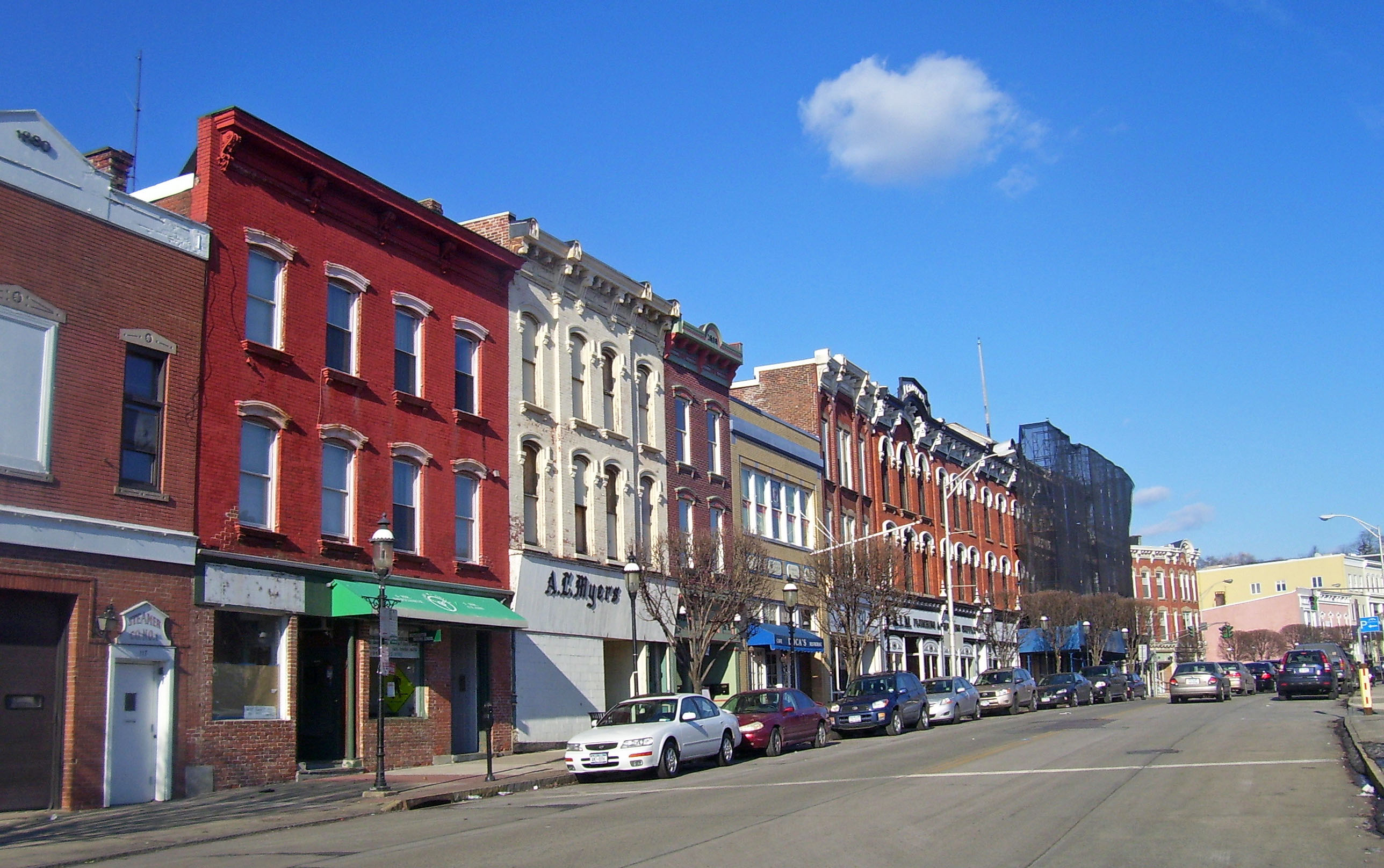
Main Street in 2009, with redevelopment of the National Bank building underway at rear

Change came to two of the newer buildings on South Highland as the 20th century became the 21st. The post office moved out of its building for a newer facility on the south side of Main Street, in the space cleared three decades earlier by urban renewal opposite the western extent of the district. Its former building was converted to retail use. Just to its north, the Cynthard Building was damaged by a fire in 2003, and was closed for three years while it was repaired and restored. In 2004, the village took possession of the Bank for Savings building, vacant since 1983. Two years later, a developer acquired the Ossining National Bank Building and began restoring it for use as affordable condominiums.

Ossining's first full-time planner was hired in 2005. After extensive community input, a new draft comprehensive plan was completed in 2007, and adopted in 2009. It recommended the creation of a new zoning district, Village Center, for Main Street, which was quickly adopted. In 2011 the village implemented another recommendation, putting out formal requests for redevelopment proposals for both the Bank for Savings building and the 147–155 Main properties. In 2015, Hudson Crossing at Market Square, a complex with residential, restaurant and retail space, was opened in the latter buildings.

== Significant contributing properties ==
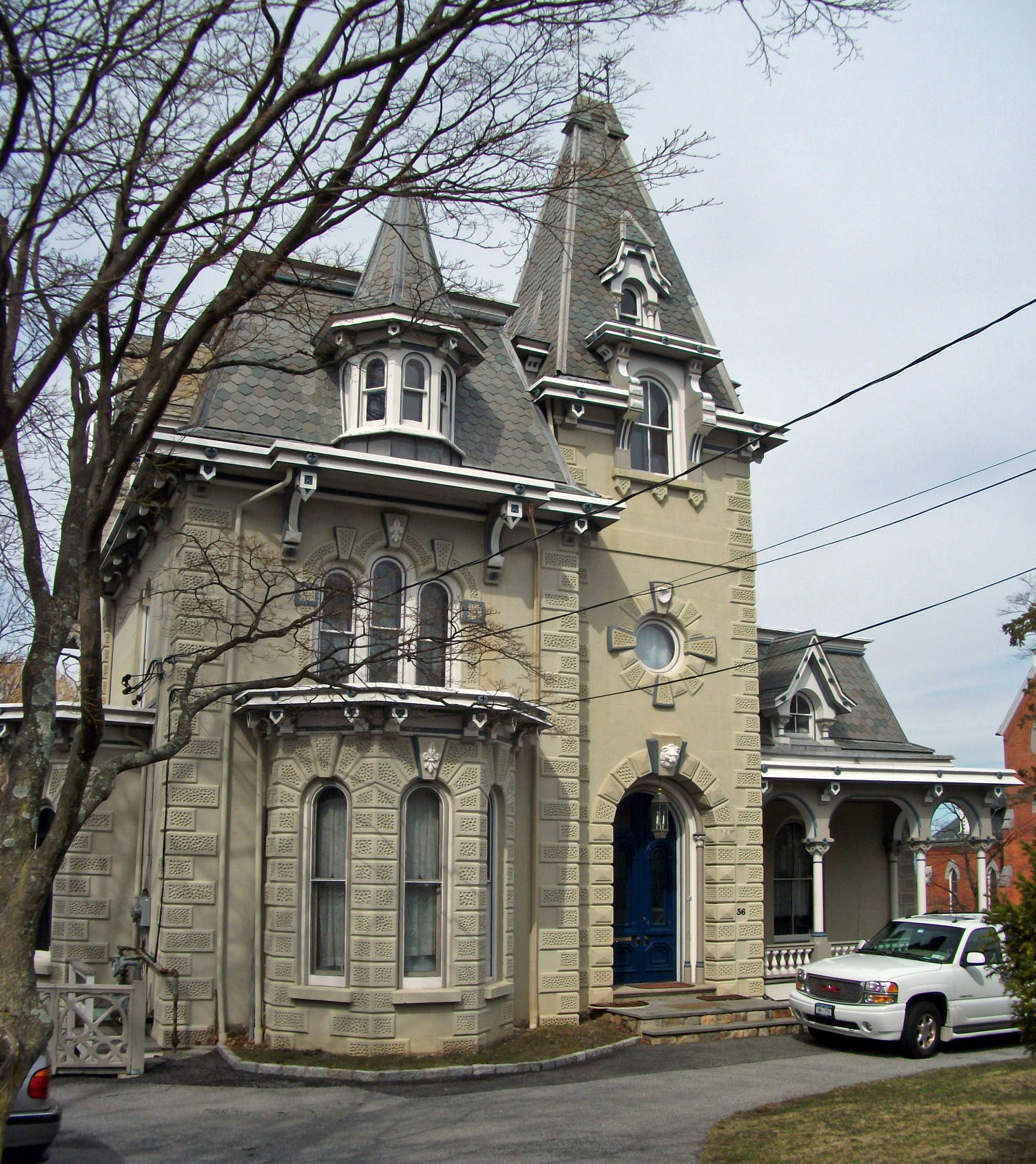
Highland Cottage, 36 S. Highland Avenue

Among the district's 23 buildings and structures are many that are architecturally distinctive or unique, or important to the village's history. Two of them have been listed individually on the Register; one of those, the Old Croton Aqueduct, is a National Historic Landmark.

=== National Register of Historic Places ===
- First Baptist Church of Ossining, 1 Church Street. Brooklyn architect J. Walsh designed this High Victorian Gothic structure, built on the site where the church had stood since 1815. The 1874 church features many triangles and quatrefoils in its decoration, representing the Trinity and four Gospels respectively. It is home to Ossining's oldest congregation, established in the 1780s by founding settler Elijah Hunter. Almost a century later, in 1973, it became Ossining's first property listed on the National Register.
- Highland Cottage, 36 S. Highland Ave. This 1872 Gothic structure was the first concrete house in the county. Later it was used as a business school.
- Old Croton Aqueduct, space between 165 and 173 Main Street. The 5-by-7-foot (1.5 by 2.1 m) masonry tunnel 20 feet (6.1 m) below ground is topped with a walkway (not considered a contributing structure itself since it is too new), paved with brick within the downtown area, that leads north to Croton Dam. An engineering accomplishment when it was built in the late 1830s, it was New York City's first clean municipal water supply and the first in its extensive network of reservoirs and aqueducts upstate. Other city aqueducts have since replaced it, but its northern end has been reopened to supply Ossining and other communities at its north end. It was listed on the Register in 1974 and upgraded to National Historic Landmark status in 1992.

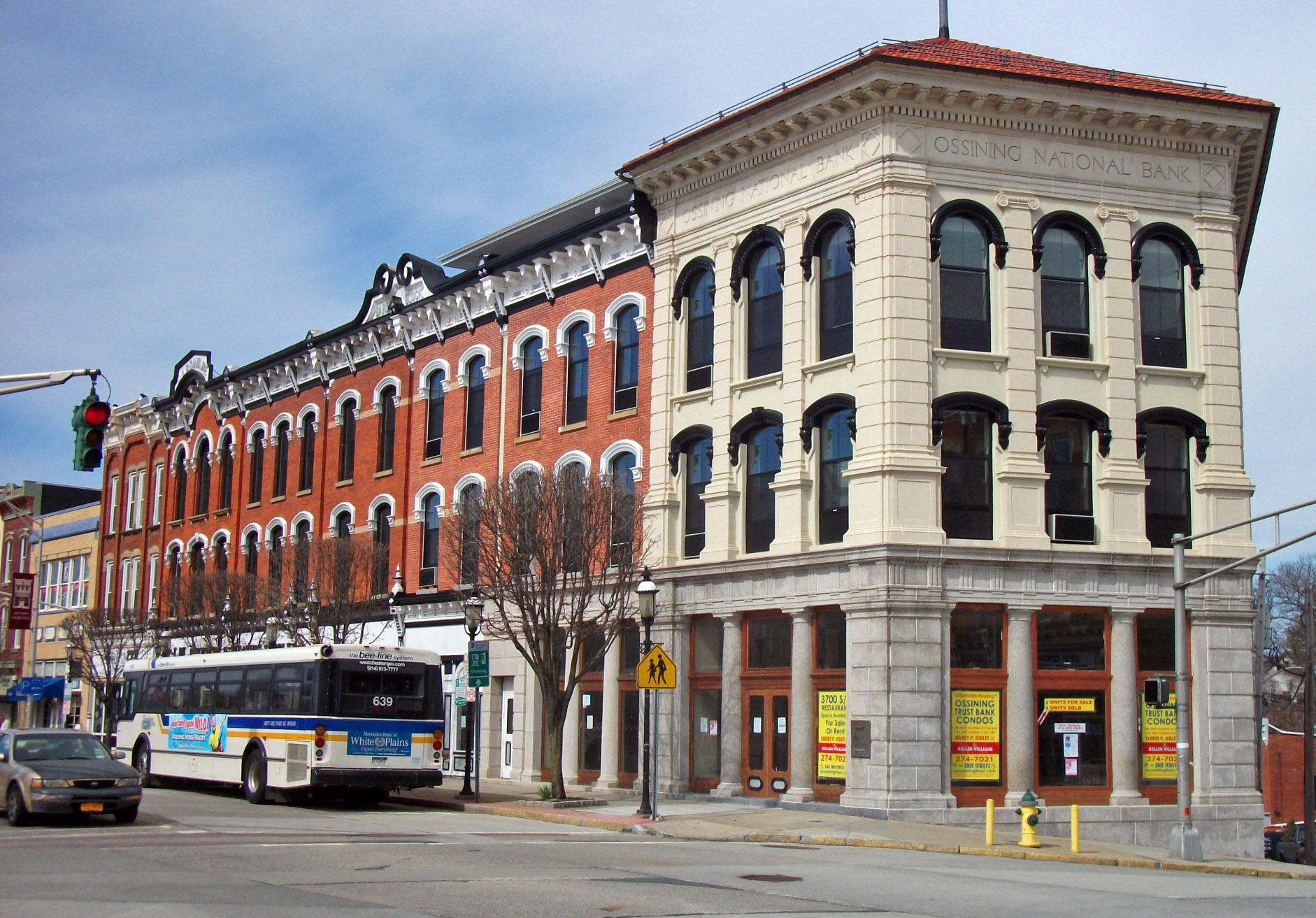
The Barlow Block and National Bank Building, 129–139 Main Street

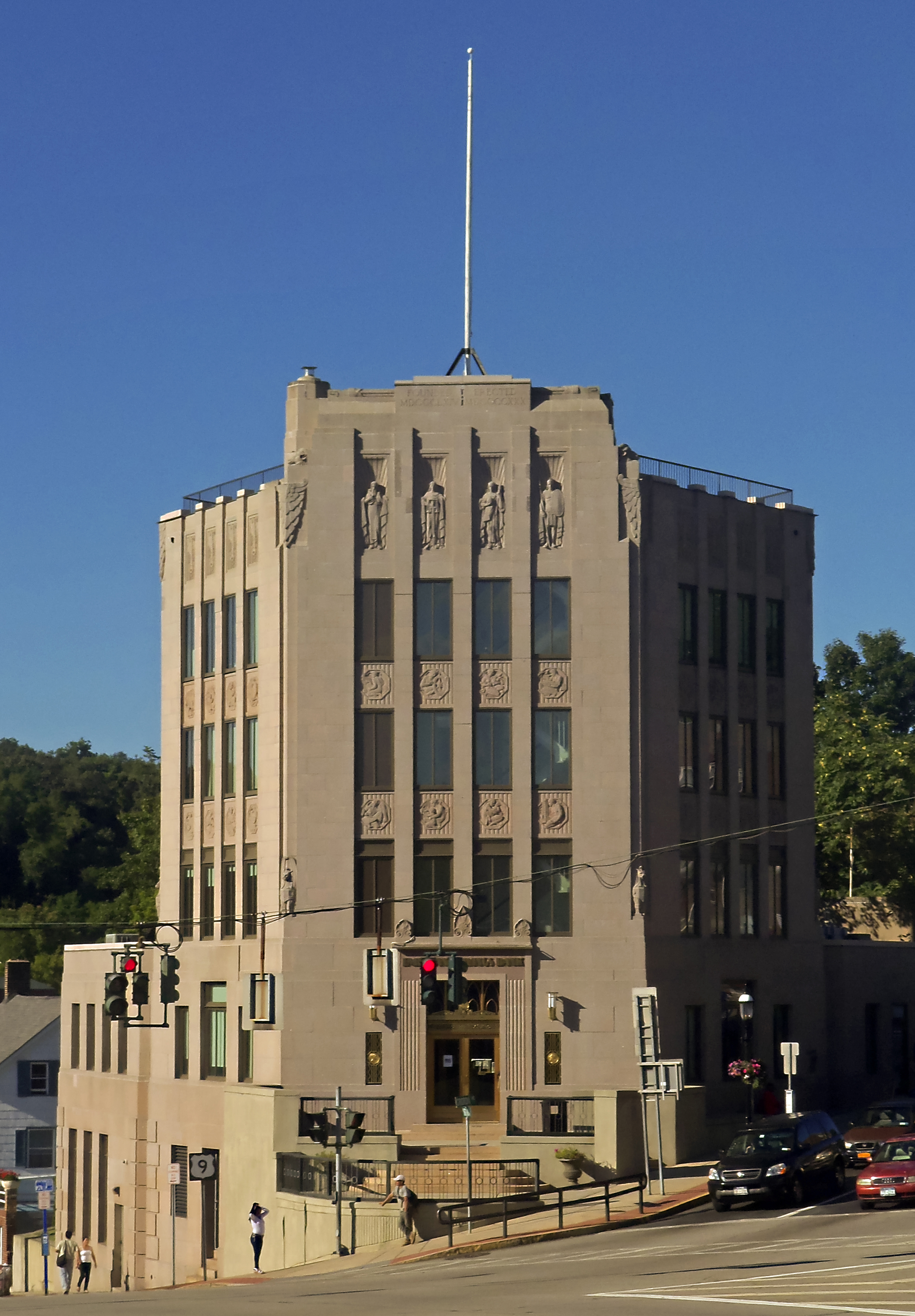
First National Bank building, 13 Croton Avenue

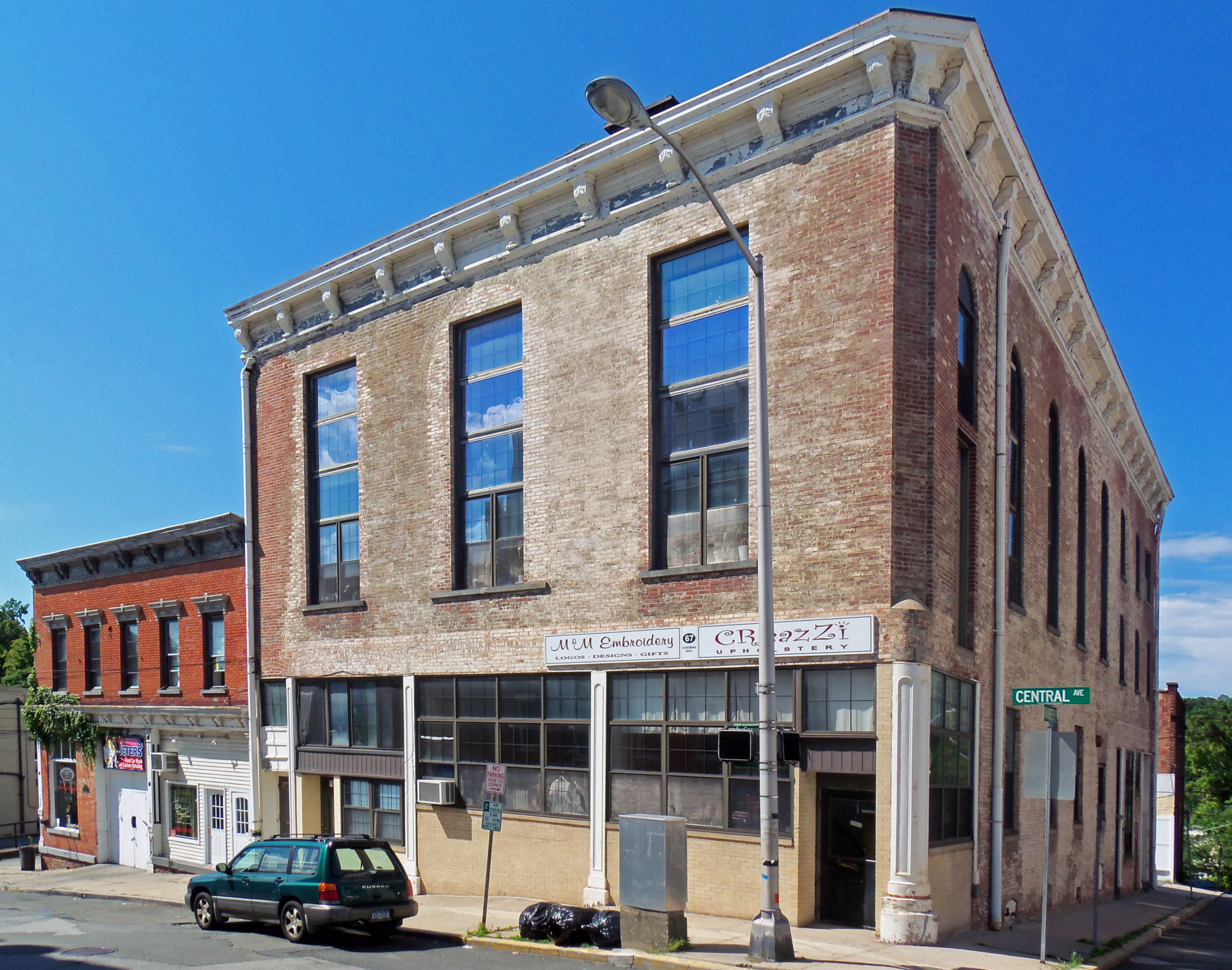
Olive Opera House, 63–67 Central Avenue

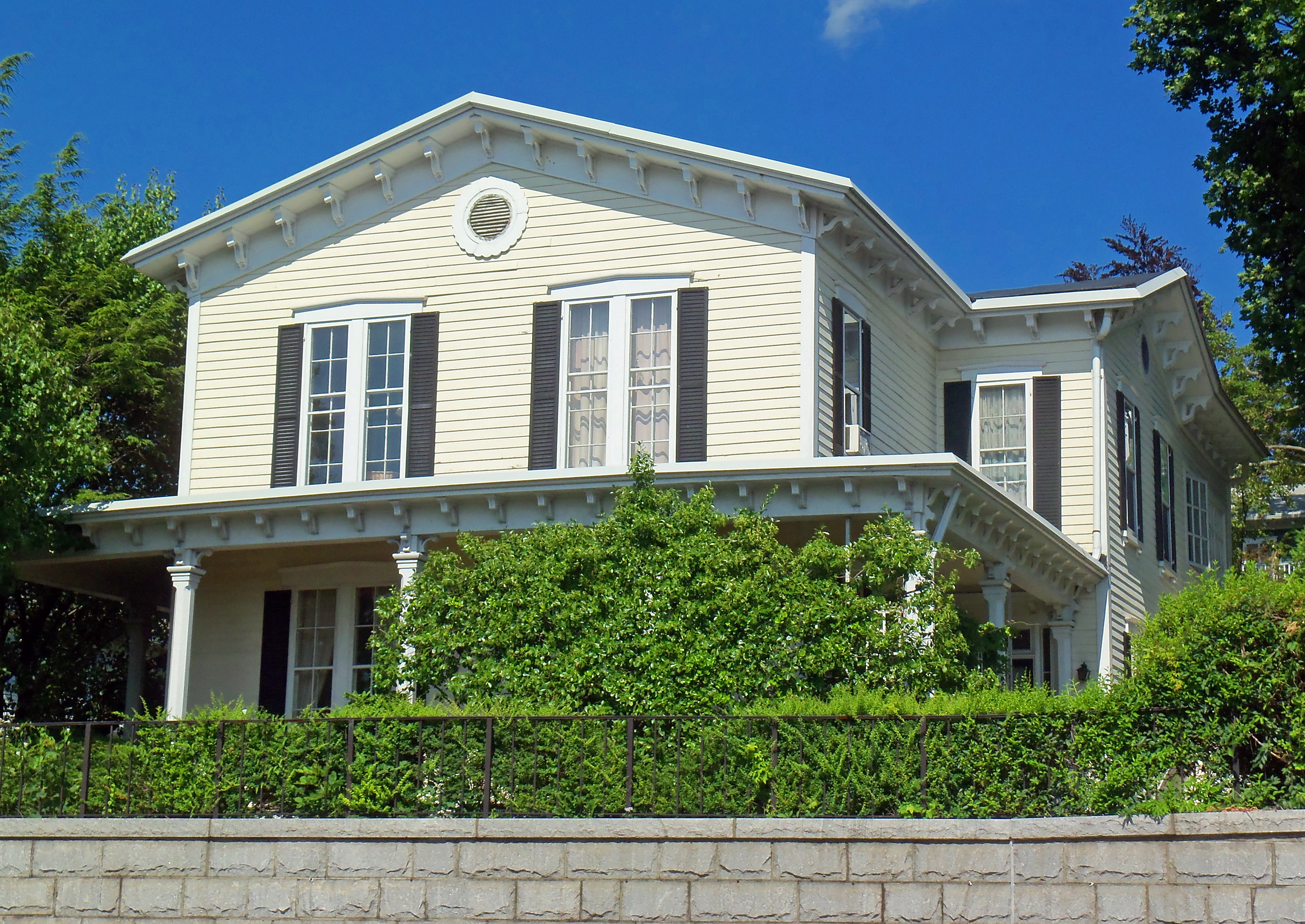
House at 23 South Highland Avenue

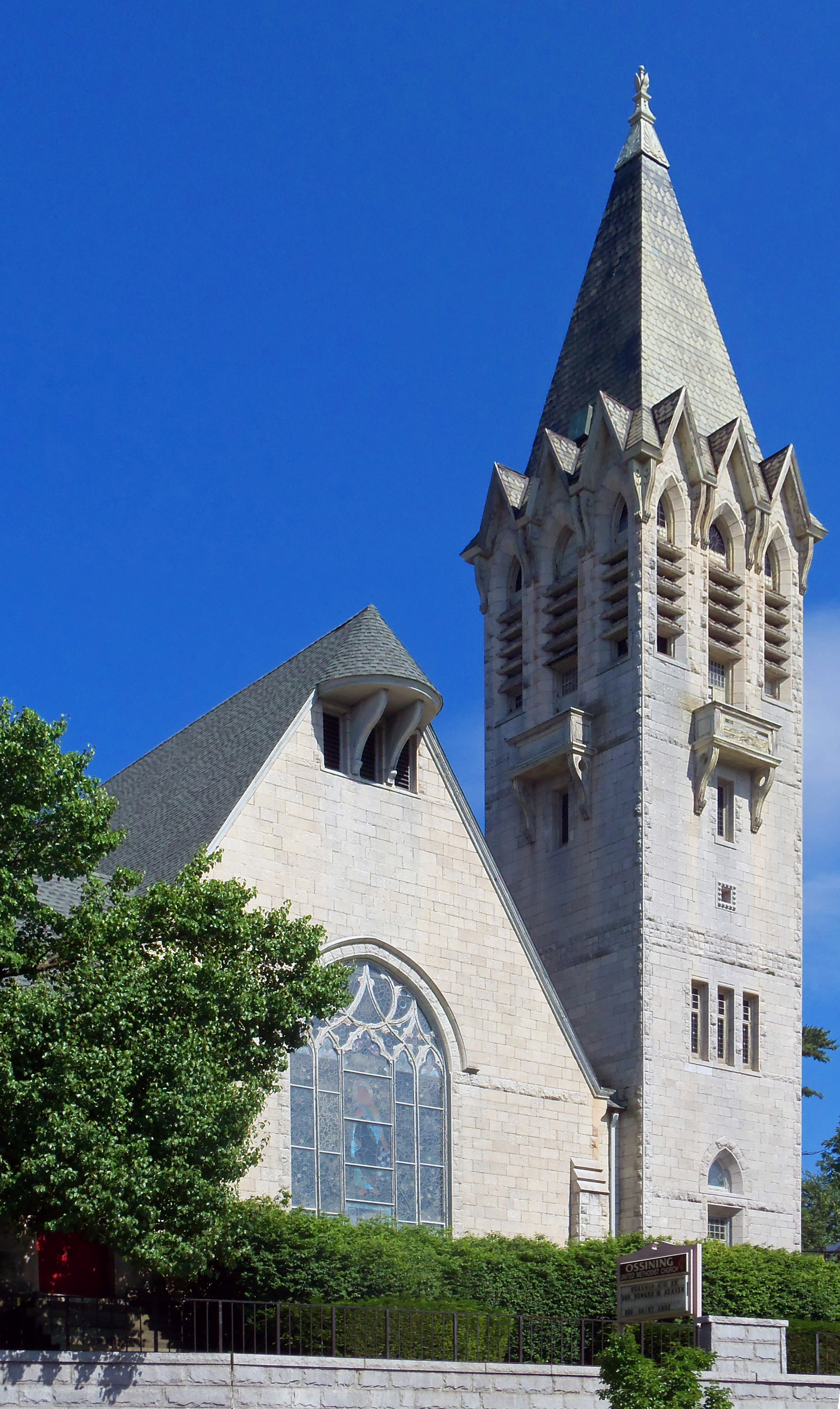
Ossining United Methodist Church, Highland Avenue and Emwilton Place

=== Other contributing properties ===
- Bank for Savings, 200 Main Street. Located just north of the Baptist Church at the junction of Main and South Highland, this 1907 stone building is a focal point for traffic coming into downtown Ossining from the north on Route 9. Lansing Holden's design is the only example of the Beaux Arts style in the village.
- Barlow Block, 129–139 Main Street, including Ossining National Bank Building. The Barlow Block is named for the local family who rebuilt the property where their hardware and furniture store had been located after most of the original structure burned down in an 1872 fire. The replacement buildings are ornate Italianate structures with pediments and bracketed cornices. The building at the north end, later modified to be the village's post office, was remodeled into the Renaissance Revival bank building in 1906. After a long period of vacancy in the late 20th century, it has been restored and repurposed as affordable housing.
- Building at 61 Central Avenue. Built in 1875, this two-story, five-bay brick commercial building with a cast iron storefront is the only one in the district to have columns supported by high plinth blocks.
- Building at 125 Main Street. The only building in the district to use yellow brick and limestone trim was constructed in 1920.
- Building at 127 Main Street. This more elaborate Renaissance Revival building, with brick pilasters and a metal cornice with an intermediate cornice, dates to 1885.
- Building at 141–145 Main Street. Another structure rebuilt following one of the fires of the early 1870s, it was the first in the district to use the Renaissance Revival style.
- Building at 189 Main Street. The only Renaissance Revival building in the district with belt courses and stone quoins dates to 1911.
- Building at 201–203 Main Street. The tiled shed roof and parapet on this 1914 building are traits of the Spanish Colonial Revival style. It is the only example in the district.
- Building at 205 Main Street. All the decoration on this 1913 Renaissance Revival building is brick, unique in the district.
- Cynthard Building, 26 South Highland Avenue. This one-story terra cotta-faced building with neoclassical detailing was built in 1929 on the site once occupied by the Union Hotel, an early overnight stop on the Albany Post Road. Renovated after a 2003 fire.
- First National Bank, 13 Croton Avenue. Located at the intersection with North Highland Avenue, it is the only Art Deco building in the district, dating to 1930, and the only one of its three bank buildings still used for that purpose.
- First Presbyterian Church, 34 South Highland Avenue. Isaac G. Perry designed this High Victorian Gothic brick church, brick with white wood trim like the nearby First Baptist Church, in 1870 when the Presbyterians turned their old church over to the breakaway Trinity Episcopalian congregation who had shared it. A Sunday School wing was added in 1955.
- House at 23 South Highland Avenue. This 1840s Italian-villa style wood frame house is the oldest building in the district, and one of only two residences.
- Keenan Building, 199 Main Street. After the original building on the site was damaged by one of the 1870s fires, this replaced it in high Renaissance Revival style.
- Old U.S. Post Office, 30 South Highland Avenue. Arthur Ware designed this detailed Classical Revival building in 1933, part of a massive New Deal rebuilding program. It continued to serve as the post office until the new facility on the south side of Main was built at the end of the century, and is now a retail space. It is the most recent of all the district's contributing properties, and one of only three post offices in New York that contribute to historic districts despite being found ineligible to be listed on the Register individually.
- Olive Opera House, 63–67 Central Avenue. Built in 1865, this three-story brick building with a hipped roof served its original purpose as a performing arts and meeting space until the early 1920s. Since then it has been a factory and, more recently, a commercial building.
- Ossining High School, 29 South Highland Avenue. James Gamble Rogers contributed the original Collegiate Gothic building in 1930. Originally it served all the secondary-level students in the community. The community and district have grown enough that even after a 1958 expansion it now serves only the high school students from the village and town of Ossining, including those portions of nearby Briarcliff Manor within the town, and some portions of neighboring towns within the school district.
- Ossining Municipal Building, 16 Croton Avenue. A stone Classical Revival structure built in 1914 by Donn Barber, it has housed the village government and, since 1934, town government as well.
- Ossining United Methodist Church, South Highland Avenue and Emwilton Place. One of the few surviving churches by Ebenezer Roberts, who collaborated on this 1885 structure with Laurence Valk. Its polychrome stonework and detail put it more firmly in the High Victorian Gothic style than his other churches are known to have been. Louis Comfort Tiffany signed one of his Favrile glass windows inside.
- Palmer Hall and Stayver Building, 191–93 Main Street. Two Renaissance Revival buildings that replaced structures lost to the 1876 fire, they are distinguished by Neo-Grec detail work.
- Trinity Episcopal Church, 7 South Highland Avenue. The fifth of architect Robert W. Gibson's series of English Gothic churches in New York, Trinity was built in 1891 on the site of the former Presbyterian church. It was the last of the district's four churches to be built. The parish house wing, added in 1905, gives it a U-shaped layout unique among Gibson's work.

== Zoning and regulation ==
The village's zoning code has since the adoption of the 2009 comprehensive plan assigned a unique district, called Village Center, to downtown. It is intended to preserve downtown "as the center of village life" by promoting business uses of greater intensity than elsewhere in the village and encouraging mixed-use development, with upper levels of buildings available for residential use. To that latter end, it requires that residents of a building have an entrance available that is separate from any used for commercial purposes, that no residential use is permitted on the ground floor and that units be at least 450 square feet (42 m^{2}) for studio apartments, 600 square feet (56 m^{2}) for one-bedrooms, 750 square feet (70 m^{2}) for two-bedrooms with 250 square feet (23 m^{2}) required for any additional bedroom.

Along with Sparta and the waterfront, the district is covered by a historic overlay district defined elsewhere in the zoning code. They are overseen by the Historic Preservation Commission (HPC), a body of seven residents appointed by the village manager. At least one member has to have practical experience in architecture, urban planning, land development or real estate, or live in a historic district or designated local landmark, or have a practical interest in local history or preservation (a single member with all those qualifications can satisfy the statutory requirement). They serve for five-year staggered terms. The HPC considers applications for landmark status, and develops overall preservation strategies for the village, but does not consider applications for redeveloping individual properties.

The village's zoning requires that all new construction, save additions to or expansions of detached single-family homes and residential duplexes, receive site plan approval from the village's Planning Board. This applies to almost all properties in the district. The seven members of the board are, like the HPC members, appointed to five-year terms by the village manager; two must have relevant expertise.

The Planning Board also serves as the Board of Architectural Review (BAR), which has the power to reject proposed buildings for "[i]nappropriateness in relation to the established character of other structures in the immediate area or neighboring areas with respect to significant design features, such as material or quality of architectural design ..." An unsuccessful applicant, or one requiring a variance, can go before the Zoning Board of Appeals (ZBA). Its five members are, as with the Planning Board and HPC, appointed by the village manager for five-year terms; there are no qualifications on membership.

== Proposals in comprehensive plan ==
The village's 2009 comprehensive plan identifies three objectives for downtown: to promote it as a business location, create a major downtown draw for visitors and residents, and improve and enhance its amenities. It recommends specific actions to accomplish all three.

To the first end, it recommends making the village's government more user-friendly for existing and prospective businesses, addressing the 18 percent vacancy rate reported in 2007. The Village Board and Planning Board should both be able to provide more information and reach out to local and regional business organizations. The zoning process, the plan contends, could be improved, since many existing businesses downtown are on conditional uses, and site plan approvals should have a time limit, forcing owners to begin development. Creation of a business improvement district and appointment of a Main Street Manager would make the development of downtown businesses more effective and efficient.

During the process of drafting the plan, many residents expressed a desire for a national chain retailer or restaurant to be enticed to locate near or in downtown as a draw. The plan considers this ill-advised and unlikely to happen for several reasons. Chains do not like to pioneer a new area, instead preferring to cluster with each other, and this leads to the development of large strip malls, impractical and undesirable in downtown Ossining, which still shows the scars of previous demolitions for urban renewal. Ossining as a whole is also geographically undesirable for chains, since not only is it neither affluent enough or accessible enough from major highways, the Hudson River cuts the potential trade area for such stores in half.

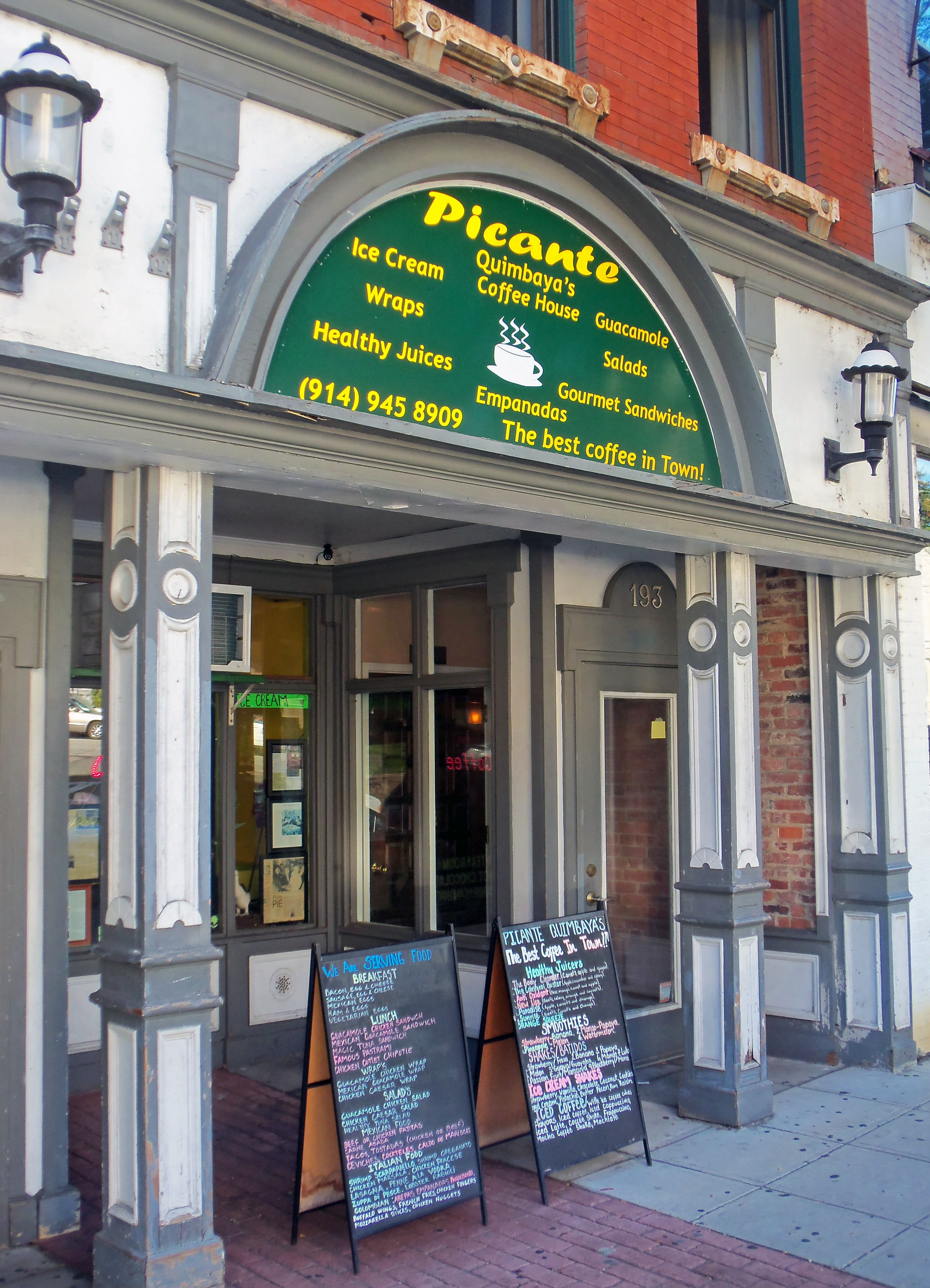
A Latin-themed coffeehouse at 193 Main Street, 2012

Instead, it recommends building on the existing clusters of restaurants and home-furnishings stores. Two businesses in each, Doca's Portuguese restaurant and Melita's respectively, draw customers from all over the county. Other regional chainlets could be drawn to Ossining. Restaurants in particular could see more ethnic diversity, widening the existing focus on Latin fare. The plan also recommends both improving cultural offerings downtown, and promoting more residential and office use to increase foot traffic at more times of the day.

Residents also complained that the parking lots opposite the Crescent were unsightly, and that they found it difficult to find parking downtown. The plan recommends creating a village green on part of the lot at the southwest corner of Main and Spring streets, outside the district, as a focal point of downtown. It could retain parking along the sides or even in a garage underneath, a common practice in Europe. Further parking could be added in an aboveground garage on Brandreth Street, outside of downtown. The village should also act to create a consistent downtown environment by encouraging infill development, making signage and lighting consistent, and strengthening and consistently enforcing its historic preservation guidelines.

The plan also recommended improving connections between downtown and the waterfront, where the Metro-North commuter rail station or the Haverstraw–Ossining Ferry could bring visitors into the village without adding to the parking problem. "A synergy between waterfront uses and downtown will enhance both areas, and provide reasons for visitors to stay in Ossining longer", it says. The plan further suggests studying the possibility of establishing a jitney or shuttle bus service that would not only allow visitors to bypass the steep climb up Main Street from the waterfront to downtown but continue westward to the residential areas of the village and town. Other measures to enhance the connection include signage, improved walkways and lighting, and dedicated space for river views.

In 2019, the village began the process of updating the plan. In July, a steering committee, with mayor Victoria Gearity, village trustee Quantel Bazemore, planning board member Jeff Gasbarro and six citizens, was appointed. Several months later the village put out a request for proposal to identify a planning firm as its consultant, and seeking residents willing to serve on the committee.

=== Expansion of district and regulatory agencies' powers ===
The plan recommended that the village expand the historic district, at least as defined within its zoning code. A draft map at its website shows the southern boundary expanding one lot down the west side of South Highland, across Maple Street, to include Highland Cottage, an 1872 reinforced concrete house already listed on the Register. At the northern end, the property at 22–24 Croton Avenue next to the municipal building would be included, and the west end would extend to 55 and 57 Central Avenue and 107–113 Main Street. That boundary increase was approved by the National Park Service at the beginning of 2013.

In addition, the plan recommended that the boundaries of the historic district be signed and maps posted. The powers of the village's regulatory bodies over it should be improved as well. It calls for the HPC's decisions to be made binding, and the draft design guidelines it and the BAR use should be improved and made a formal reference document, in order to ensure that infill development is consistent with the existing buildings in the district.

== See also ==
- National Register of Historic Places listings in northern Westchester County, New York
- Peekskill Downtown Historic District, another Westchester river-town downtown on the National Register
