= National Register of Historic Places listings in northern Westchester County, New York =

Location of Westchester County in New York

This is a list of the National Register of Historic Places listings in northern Westchester County, New York, excluding the city of Peekskill, which has its own list.

This is intended to be a complete list of the properties and districts on the National Register of Historic Places in the northern half of Westchester County, New York, United States. The following communities comprise this region:

- Bedford (including Bedford Corners, Bedford Hills etc.)
- Cortlandt (including the villages of Buchanan, Croton-on-Hudson, and Montrose).
- Lewisboro, including the hamlets of Cross River, Goldens Bridge, South Salem and Waccabuc.
- Mount Kisco
- Mount Pleasant (including the villages of Briarcliff Manor, Pleasantville, Sleepy Hollow and the hamlets of Hawthorne, Pocantico Hills and Thornwood).
- New Castle, including the hamlets of Chappaqua and Millwood
- North Castle, including the hamlet of Armonk
- North Salem, including the hamlets of Croton Falls and Purdys
- Ossining, including the eponymous village
- Pound Ridge
- Somers, including the hamlets of Amawalk, Baldwin Place (Westchester portion), Lincolndale and Whitehall Corners
- The village of Tarrytown
- Yorktown, including the hamlets of Jefferson Valley, Mohegan Lake, Shrub Oak and Yorktown Heights.

Entries for the city of Peekskill are listed separately.

Latitude and longitude coordinates are provided for many National Register properties and districts; these locations may be seen together in a map.

Of the 242 properties and districts listed on the National Register in the county, 99, including 12 National Historic Landmarks (NHLs), are on this list. Two, the Bronx River Parkway and Old Croton Aqueduct, the latter an NHL, are linear listings included on both this list and the southern Westchester list.

This National Park Service list is complete through NPS recent listings posted August 28, 2026.

Contents: Counties in New York
Albany (Albany) – Allegany – Bronx – Broome – Cattaraugus – Cayuga – Chautauqua – Chemung – Chenango – Clinton – Columbia – Cortland – Delaware – Dutchess (Poughkeepsie, Rhinebeck) – Erie (Buffalo) – Essex – Franklin – Fulton – Genesee – Greene – Hamilton – Herkimer – Jefferson – Kings – Lewis – Livingston – Madison – Monroe (Rochester) – Montgomery – Nassau – New York (Below 14th Street, 14th to 59th Streets, 59th to 110th Streets, Above 110th Street, Islands) – Niagara (Niagara Falls) – Oneida – Onondaga (Syracuse) – Ontario – Orange – Orleans – Oswego – Otsego – Putnam – Queens – Rensselaer – Richmond – Rockland – St. Lawrence – Saratoga – Schenectady – Schoharie – Schuyler – Seneca – Steuben – Suffolk – Sullivan – Tioga – Tompkins – Ulster – Warren – Washington – Wayne – Westchester (Northern, Southern, New Rochelle, Peekskill, Yonkers) – Wyoming – Yates

== Current listings ==
	Name on the Register	Image	Date listed	Location	City or town	Description
1	All Saints Episcopal Church	All Saints Episcopal Church	May 2, 2002 (#02000449)	96 and 201 Scarborough Rd. 41°08′41″N 73°50′36″W	Briarcliff Manor	1854 stone English Gothic church.
2	Amawalk Friends Meeting House	Amawalk Friends Meeting House	November 16, 1989 (#89002004)	Quaker Church Rd. 41°17′32″N 73°46′18″W	Amawalk	Well-preserved 1831 Quaker meeting house is rare one built by Hicksites during schism. War photographer Robert Capa and many of his family buried in cemetery.
3	Apple Hill Farm		August 30, 2026 (#100013358)	35 Apple Hill Lane; 41°08′59″N 73°46′13″W	Chappaqua	
4	Asbury United Methodist Church and Bethel Chapel and Cemetery	Asbury United Methodist Church and Bethel Chapel and Cemetery	March 31, 2000 (#00000310)	19 Old Post Rd. and Old Post Rd. S 41°12′26″N 73°52′50″W	Croton-on-Hudson	
5	Richard Austin House	Richard Austin House	September 20, 1988 (#88001527)	196 Croton Ave. 41°10′00″N 73°50′46″W	Ossining	1878 Gothic revival house is one of few totally intact in Ossining from early era of suburbanization
6	Bear Mountain Bridge	Bear Mountain Bridge	November 23, 1982 (#82001266)	US 6/202; 41°19′12″N 73°58′49″W	Cortlandt	First bridge across Hudson north of New York City. Part of the Hudson Highlands Multiple Resource Area (MRA). Extends into Rockland County
7	Bear Mountain Bridge Rd.	Bear Mountain Bridge Rd.	November 23, 1982 (#82001274)	NY 6/202, between Bear Mt. Bridge; 41°19′12″N 73°58′47″W	Cortlandt	Private toll road built to access bridge in 1924; later turned over to state; part of the Hudson Highlands MRA
8	Bedford Road Historic District	Bedford Road Historic District	November 21, 1985 (#85002903)	Bedford Rd. 41°07′31″N 73°42′45″W	Armonk	Small cluster of mid-19th century Federal and Greek Revival houses and Presbyterian Church is rare remaining group of buildings in those styles in area, and beginning of settlement of Armonk.
9	Bedford Village Historic District	Bedford Village Historic District	October 2, 1973 (#73001285)	Roughly bounded by Court, Seminary, Poundridge and Greenwich Rds. 41°12′14″N 73°38′22″W	Bedford	
10	Brandreth Pill Factory	Brandreth Pill Factory	January 10, 1980 (#80002792)	Water St. 41°09′54″N 73°52′11″W	Ossining	Benjamin Brandreth's facility was beginning of Ossining's industrial development when built in the 1830s. Later modified and expanded; stayed in operation until the 1940s; largely demolished in 2015 after damage from Superstorm Sandy.
11	Bridge L-158	Bridge L-158	November 29, 1978 (#78001923)	West of Goldens Bridge at Croton River; 41°17′47″N 73°40′59″W	Goldens Bridge	Only remaining double-intersection Whipple truss rail bridge in New York. Built in 1883 near Kingston and moved to this location in 1904. Out of service since 1960.
12	Bronx River Parkway Reservation	Bronx River Parkway Reservation	January 11, 1991 (#90002143)	Bronx River Pkwy. from jct. with Sprain Brook Rd. to and including Kensico Dam Plaza; 41°04′04″N 73°46′10″W	Valhalla and Bronxville	
13	Caramoor	Caramoor	May 25, 2001 (#01000548)	149-181 Girdle Ridge Rd. 41°14′19″N 73°38′48″W	Bedford	1930s Renaissance Revival estate now used as classical music venue
14	Carrie Chapman Catt House	Carrie Chapman Catt House	May 4, 2006 (#06000336)	20 Ryder Rd. 41°10′35″N 73°48′55″W	Briarcliff Manor	Home of suffragist Carrie Chapman Catt at the time the 19th Amendment was ratified
15	Chappaqua Railroad Depot and Depot Plaza	Chappaqua Railroad Depot and Depot Plaza	April 19, 1979 (#79003210)	200 South Greeley Ave; 41°09′28″N 73°46′31″W	Chappaqua	1902 station and park with war memorial and statue of Horace Greeley built on land donated by his daughter and son-in-law. Still used as waiting area.
16	Christ Episcopal Church	Christ Episcopal Church	April 23, 1987 (#87000658)	Broadway and Elizabeth Sts. 41°04′30″N 73°51′35″W	Tarrytown	Washington Irving was member of this congregation, and his pew is still preserved. Built in 1837, this is the earliest Gothic Revival church in America
17	Church of Saint Mary the Virgin and Greeley Grove	Church of Saint Mary the Virgin and Greeley Grove	April 19, 1979 (#79003213)	191 South Greeley Ave. 41°09′20″N 73°46′21″W	Chappaqua	Horace Greeley planted the grove as a windbreak and reforestation project in 1856. In 1904 his daughter and son-in-law built a private chapel modeled on a similarly-named church in England, which later donated one of its stained glass windows. It became an Episcopal parish in 1916.
18	Aaron Copland House	Aaron Copland House	September 19, 2003 (#03000245)	1538 Washington St. 41°14′25″N 73°54′11″W	Cortlandt Manor	Home of composer for last 30 years of his life
19	Gerard Crane House	Gerard Crane House	September 5, 1985 (#85001954)	Old Croton Falls Rd. 41°20′27″N 73°40′30″W	Somers	Sophisticated 1849 stone Greek Revival house
20	Old Croton Aqueduct	Old Croton Aqueduct	December 2, 1974 (#74001324)	Runs N from Yonkers to New Croton Dam; 41°12′52″N 73°51′52″W	Various	First long-distance aqueduct built to provide water from upstate to New York City. An engineering marvel in its time now used as a linear park. Designated a National Historic Landmark and revised in 1992; the extended designation includes the aqueduct's route in the Bronx and a small part of Manhattan.
21	Croton North Railroad Station	Croton North Railroad Station	August 27, 1987 (#87001458)	Senasqua Rd. 41°12′25″N 73°53′40″W	Croton-on-Hudson	Intact 1890 station, now used as offices, exemplifies commuter rail stations of that era. Two former Erie Railroad cars on old siding included in listing.
22	Dale Cemetery	Dale Cemetery	July 17, 2013 (#13000500)	104 Havell St. 41°10′16″N 73°51′22″W	Town of Ossining	1851 cemetery with graves of Thomas Allcock, Benjamin Brandreth and other local notables. Now owned by town.
23	Downtown Ossining Historic District	Downtown Ossining Historic District	August 9, 1989 (#88001827)	Roughly along US 9, Main St., and Croton Ave. 41°09′38″N 73°51′42″W	Ossining	Core of village reflecting impact of construction of Old Croton Aqueduct and 1870s fires.
24	Dutch Reformed Church	Dutch Reformed Church	October 15, 1966 (#66000581)	N edge of Tarrytown on U.S. 9; 41°02′10″N 73°51′47″W	Sleepy Hollow	Surviving 1685 stone church built by Dutch is state's oldest church; figures prominently in Washington Irving's "The Legend of Sleepy Hollow"
25	Elephant Hotel	Elephant Hotel	August 7, 1974 (#74001323)	335 U.S. Route 202; 41°19′43″N 73°41′09″W	Somers	Birthplace of the circus in America, when Zephaliah Bailey began charging visitors to see his elephant. Now used as a circus museum, offices of the Somers Historical Society and town hall.
26	First Baptist Church and Rectory	First Baptist Church and Rectory	July 21, 1983 (#83001829)	56 S. Broadway; 41°04′28″N 73°51′33″W	Tarrytown	Victorian Gothic 1876 church designed by Russell Sturgis and patronized by Rockefellers.
27	First Baptist Church of Ossining	First Baptist Church of Ossining	January 12, 1973 (#73001288)	S. Highland Ave. and Main St. 41°09′41″N 73°51′43″W	Ossining	1874 church is most advanced application of Gothic Revival style in Ossining; church was founded by town's founder
28	Marmaduke Forster House	Marmaduke Forster House	February 22, 2011 (#11000139)	413-415 Bedford Rd. 41°08′04″N 73°47′23″W	Pleasantville	
29	Foster Memorial AME Zion Church	Foster Memorial AME Zion Church	June 3, 1982 (#82003414)	90 Wildey St. 41°04′48″N 73°51′44″W	Tarrytown	Founded in 1860, this is the oldest black church in Westchester County and possibly one of the oldest in the state
30	Glenwolde Park Historic District	Glenwolde Park Historic District	September 3, 2014 (#14000542)	Glenwolde Park, Walter St. & Willowbrook Ave. 41°03′32″N 73°51′40″W	Tarrytown	Tudor-styled residential district built during 1920s suburbanization
31	Greeley House	Greeley House	April 19, 1979 (#79003212)	100 King St. 41°09′32″N 73°46′19″W	Chappaqua	Home of newspaper editor Horace Greeley, pioneering suburbanite, staunch abolitionist and 1872 presidential candidate. Much of today's downtown Chappaqua is built on land he farmed.
32	Hammond House	Hammond House	May 6, 1980 (#80002790)	South of Hawthorne on Grasslands Rd. 41°04′34″N 73°48′42″W	Hawthorne	1720 home, modified twice in 19th century, is one of only two original tenant houses from the Van Cortlandt Manor left. Owned by the county historical society since 1926.
33	Edward Harden Mansion	Edward Harden Mansion	January 16, 2004 (#03001401)	200 North Broadway; 41°04′58″N 73°51′28″W	Sleepy Hollow	1909 Colonial Revival house built for journalist and investor Edward Harden was later home to first U.S. Montessori school
34	John A. Hartford House	John A. Hartford House	December 22, 1977 (#77000987)	Southwest of Valhalla on New York State Route 100; 41°04′08″N 73°47′25″W	Valhalla	Home of founder of A & P; now part of Westchester Community College
35	Highland Cottage	Highland Cottage	July 22, 1982 (#02001457)	36 S. Highland Ave. 41°09′35″N 73°51′41″W	Ossining	1872 reinforced-concrete Gothic Revival house
36	The Homestead	The Homestead	March 29, 2001 (#01000294)	36 Mead St. 41°16′59″N 73°35′44″W	Waccabuc	
37	Washington Irving High School	Washington Irving High School	April 26, 1984 (#84003437)	18 N. Broadway; 41°03′32″N 73°51′28″W	Tarrytown	
38	John Jay Homestead	John Jay Homestead	July 24, 1972 (#72000918)	Jay St. 41°15′01″N 73°39′31″W	Katonah	Home of John Jay, major landowner in area, first Chief Justice of the United States and early state governor
39	John Jones Homestead	John Jones Homestead	May 25, 1989 (#89000462)	Oregon Rd. and Durrin Ave. 41°18′58″N 73°54′00″W	Van Cortlandtville	
40	Jug Tavern	Jug Tavern	June 7, 1976 (#76001293)	Revolutionary Rd. and Rockledge Ave. 41°08′41″N 73°51′52″W	Ossining	1760s stop on former Albany Post Road route remains intact
41	Katonah Village Historic District	Katonah Village Historic District	September 15, 1983 (#83001830)	Parkway, Valleyedge, Edgemont and Bedford Rds. 41°15′20″N 73°41′02″W	Katonah	
42	Lyndhurst	Lyndhurst	November 13, 1966 (#66000582)	635 S. Broadway; 41°03′15″N 73°51′58″W	Tarrytown	Stone Gothic Revival mansion purchased and expanded by rail baron Jay Gould
43	Richard H. Mandel House	Richard H. Mandel House	March 1, 1996 (#96000176)	323 Haines Rd. 41°14′40″N 73°43′33″W	Bedford Hills	
44	Mead Memorial Chapel	Mead Memorial Chapel	November 30, 1999 (#99001443)	2 Chapel Rd. 41°17′47″N 73°35′59″W	Lewisboro	
45	Merestead	Merestead	September 27, 1984 (#84003431)	Byram Lake Rd. 41°10′31″N 73°42′19″W	Mount Kisco	
46	Miller House	Miller House	September 29, 1976 (#76001292)	Virginia Rd. 41°03′33″N 73°46′15″W	North White Plains	
47	Mount Kisco Municipal Complex	Mount Kisco Municipal Complex	March 9, 1997 (#97000116)	100-120 Main St. 41°12′09″N 73°43′37″W	Mount Kisco	
48	Mt. Zion Methodist Church	Mt. Zion Methodist Church	May 10, 1990 (#90000692)	Primrose St. south of Reis Park; 41°18′05″N 73°42′54″W	Somers	1794 church, remodeled in 1860, is early landmark in development of Methodism in New York
49	Music Hall	Music Hall	February 12, 1980 (#80002795)	11 Main St. 41°04′35″N 73°51′33″W	Tarrytown	1885 Queen Anne theater is one of the oldest in continuous use in the county
50	North Grove Street Historic District	North Grove Street Historic District	March 13, 1979 (#79001650)	1, 2, 8, 15, and 19 Grove St. 41°04′33″N 73°51′27″W	Tarrytown	Five 1860s houses built by local well-to-do mostly intact
51	North Salem Town Hall	North Salem Town Hall	September 4, 1980 (#80002794)	Titicus Rd. 41°19′44″N 73°35′51″W	Salem Center	
52	Old Chappaqua Historic District	Old Chappaqua Historic District	July 15, 1974 (#74001319)	Quaker Rd. 41°10′16″N 73°46′42″W	Chappaqua	Farmhouses and other buildings clustered around 1753 Quaker meeting house that was the core of Chappaqua before the railroad.
53	Site of Old Croton Dam	Site of Old Croton Dam	June 19, 1973 (#73001289)	In the waters of the New Croton reservoir 41°13′39″N 73°51′10″W	Cortlandt	
54	Old St. Peter's Church	Old St. Peter's Church	March 7, 1973 (#73001292)	Oregon Rd. and Locust Ave. 41°18′49″N 73°54′04″W	Van Cortlandtville	
55	Osborn–Bouton–Mead House	Osborn–Bouton–Mead House	September 15, 2004 (#04000990)	399 Pound Ridge Rd. 41°15′57″N 73°33′59″W	South Salem	
56	Palmer–Lewis Estate	Palmer–Lewis Estate	August 6, 1998 (#98001008)	Black Brook Rd. 41°13′50″N 73°37′06″W	Bedford	
57	Patriot's Park	Patriot's Park	June 14, 1982 (#82003415)	US 9; 41°04′53″N 73°51′34″W	Sleepy Hollow and Tarrytown	1853 monument to 1780 capture of British Major John André, exposing Benedict Arnold's betrayal of the Continental Army, was one of earliest to a Revolutionary War event. Later the park was a Carrère and Hastings residential development and two girls' schools.
58	Philipsburg Manor House	Philipsburg Manor House	October 15, 1966 (#66000584)	381 Bellwood Ave. 41°05′14″N 73°51′59″W	Sleepy Hollow	Intact colonial-era manor house
59	Philipse Manor Railroad Station	Philipse Manor Railroad Station	March 14, 1991 (#91000237)	Jct. of Riverside Dr. and Millard; 41°05′40″N 73°52′12″W	Sleepy Hollow	Restored octagonal Tudorbethan station house, home today to local writers' group, is intact surviving example of early 20th-century commuter rail station
60	Pound Ridge Historic District	Pound Ridge Historic District	December 30, 1985 (#85003196)	Roughly Pound Ridge, Old Stone Hill, and Salem Rds., Trinity Pass and Westchester Ave. 41°12′35″N 73°34′34″W	Pound Ridge	
61	Joseph Purdy Homestead	Joseph Purdy Homestead	January 25, 1973 (#73001290)	Jct. of NY 22 and 116; 41°19′42″N 73°39′21″W	Purdys	
62	Rehoboth	Rehoboth	April 19, 1979 (#79003214)	33 Aldridge Rd. 41°09′22″N 73°46′10″W	Chappaqua	Horace Greeley built what may be the first known concrete building as a dairy barn in 1856; later remodeled into a neo-Gothic house for his daughter by Ralph Adams Cram
63	Solomon Resnick House	Solomon Resnick House	April 22, 2021 (#100006488)	1256 Hardscrabble Rd. 41°11′06″N 73°47′07″W	Chappaqua	
64	Robinwood Historic District	Robinwood Historic District	April 5, 2019 (#100003632)	Tavano & Somerstown Rds. 41°10′28″N 73°49′50″W	Ossining	Mid-Century Modern housing enclave
65	Rockefeller Pocantico Hills Estate Historic District	Rockefeller Pocantico Hills Estate Historic District	November 4, 2019 (#100004554)	Bedford, Sleepy Hollow & Lake Rds. et al. 41°06′14″N 73°49′24″W	Pocantico Hills	Encompasses most of the former Rockefeller estate holdings
66	John D. Rockefeller Estate	John D. Rockefeller Estate	May 11, 1976 (#76001290)	Pocantico Hills; 41°05′23″N 73°50′40″W	Mt. Pleasant	Kykuit, the estate of oil magnate and American dynasty founder John D. Rockefeller; open to public tours that also pass by his grandson Nelson's extensive modern art collection.
67	Franklin Delano Roosevelt Veterans Hospital Historic District		July 15, 2022 (#100007887)	2094 Albany Post Rd. 41°14′41″N 73°55′34″W	Montrose	
68	St. Augustine's Episcopal Church Complex	St. Augustine's Episcopal Church Complex	July 26, 2006 (#06000648)	6 Old Post Rd. N 41°12′30″N 73°53′13″W	Croton-on-Hudson	
69	St. George's Church	St. George's Church	May 8, 2012 (#12000262)	1715 E. Main St. 41°19′27″N 73°51′05″W	Mohegan Lake	
70	St. John's Episcopal Church	St. John's Episcopal Church	January 31, 2017 (#100000616)	8 Sunnyside Ave. 41°08′06″N 73°47′15″W	Pleasantville	1912 Late Gothic church with later parish hall and 1800s building used as rectory are prominent local landmarks
71	St. Luke's Episcopal Church	St. Luke's Episcopal Church	January 4, 2001 (#00001612)	68 Bedford Rd. 41°15′18″N 73°41′04″W	Katonah	
72	St. Mark's Cemetery	St. Mark's Cemetery	June 23, 1988 (#88000918)	E. Main St., corner of St. Mark's Pl. 41°11′40″N 73°43′35″W	Mount Kisco	
73	St. Mark's Episcopal Church	St. Mark's Episcopal Church	November 21, 1991 (#91001725)	Jct. of N. Bedford Rd. and E. Main St. 41°12′26″N 73°43′35″W	Mount Kisco	
74	St. Paul's Episcopal Church and Rectory	St. Paul's Episcopal Church and Rectory	December 6, 1978 (#78001925)	St. Paul's Pl. 41°09′35″N 73°51′53″W	Ossining	1834 Gothic Revival church of Sing Sing marble designed by Calvin Pollard is oldest church in Ossining. Now Calvary Baptist Church.
75	Sarles' Tavern	Sarles' Tavern	December 31, 1979 (#79001647)	NY 100; 41°11′31″N 73°47′56″W	Millwood	Demolished after 1993 fire
76	Scarborough Historic District	Scarborough Historic District	September 7, 1984 (#84003433)	US 9; 41°07′45″N 73°51′22″W	Briarcliff Manor	Seven sites dating to between the 18th and 20th centuries, with a wide variety of Revival architecture styles
77	Sleepy Hollow Cemetery	Sleepy Hollow Cemetery	June 3, 2009 (#09000380)	540 N. Broadway; 41°05′24″N 73°51′43″W	Sleepy Hollow	Setting in Washington Irving's The Legend of Sleepy Hollow; his final resting place along with many other famous people.
78	Smith Tavern	Smith Tavern	September 15, 1983 (#83001833)	440 Bedford Rd. 41°07′35″N 73°41′40″W	Armonk	1770s tavern has played a variety of roles in the history of North Castle. Now used as local history museum.
79	Somers Hamlet Historic District	Somers Hamlet Historic District	April 21, 2004 (#04000349)	US 202, New York 100, New York 116, Deans Bridge Rd. and The Lane; 41°19′42″N 73°39′01″W	Somers	Core of village that arose in late 18th and early 19th centuries from junction of two widely used turnpikes; buildings show influence of both Hudson Valley and New England vernacular building traditions.
80	South Salem Presbyterian Church Cemetery	South Salem Presbyterian Church Cemetery	September 10, 2014 (#14000586)	111 Spring St. 41°16′25″N 73°33′24″W	South Salem	Veterans of the French and Indian War, Revolutionary War and War of 1812 among those buried here
81	Stepping Stones	Stepping Stones	July 16, 2004 (#04000705)	62 Oak Rd. 41°14′56″N 73°42′04″W	Katonah	Home of Alcoholics Anonymous cofounder Bill W. and his wife Lois in their later lives; AA's Big Book written here; National Historic Landmark designation October 16, 2012
82	Stonecrest	Stonecrest	January 28, 2004 (#03001520)	703 Croton Lake Rd. 41°13′32″N 73°43′40″W	Bedford Corners	
83	Sunnyside	Sunnyside	October 15, 1966 (#66000583)	Sunnyside Lane; 41°02′57″N 73°52′11″W	Tarrytown	Riverside estate of Washington Irving
84	Taconic State Parkway	Taconic State Parkway	December 8, 2005 (#05001398)	Linear north from North White Plains to Putnam County line 41°19′47″N 73°49′06″W	Mount Pleasant, Ossining, New Castle, Yorktown	Scenic divided highway planned by Franklin D. Roosevelt for state park access. Built between the 1920s and early 1960s, epitomizing peak period of parkway design.
85	Tarrytown Lighthouse	Tarrytown Lighthouse	May 29, 1979 (#79001649)	Spans Hudson River; 41°05′02″N 73°52′27″W	Sleepy Hollow	1883 lighthouse originally stood further offshore, until shore got closer. Only one on Hudson in Westchester and only conical steel lighthouse on Hudson to have family living quarters. Part of the Hudson River Lighthouses TR
86	The Woodpile	The Woodpile	February 10, 1992 (#92000030)	Jct. of Croton Lake and Wood Rds. 41°13′42″N 73°43′46″W	Bedford	
87	Underhill–Acker House	Underhill–Acker House	July 24, 2017 (#100001363)	4 Hamilton Ave. 41°12′18″N 73°53′21″W	Croton-on-Hudson	Ornate 1873 Italianate house built for local physician
88	Union Church of Pocantico Hills	Union Church of Pocantico Hills	May 6, 2002 (#02000447)	555-559 Bedford Rd. 41°05′44″N 73°49′58″W	Pocantico Hills	
89	Union Hall	Union Hall	August 28, 1986 (#86001978)	NY 116 and Keeler Ln. 41°20′07″N 73°34′15″W	North Salem	
90	United Methodist Church and Parsonage	United Methodist Church and Parsonage	November 4, 1982 (#82001278)	300 E. Main and 31 Smith Ave. 41°12′00″N 73°43′35″W	Mount Kisco	A Carpenter Gothic church built in 1868, and its parsonage
91	Usonia Historic District	Usonia Historic District	September 5, 2012 (#12000600)	Usonia & Rocky Vale Rds., Laurel Hill & Orchard Brook Drs. 41°07′42″N 73°44′56″W	Pleasantville	Community of houses designed by Frank Lloyd Wright
92	Van Cortlandt Manor	Van Cortlandt Manor	October 15, 1966 (#66000579)	U.S. 9, north of the junction with U.S. 9A; 41°11′46″N 73°52′37″W	Croton-on-Hudson	Intact Georgian-style colonial manor house, located much further north than that style is usually found
93	Van Cortlandtville School	Van Cortlandtville School	April 7, 1989 (#89000285)	297 Locust Ave. 41°18′45″N 73°54′01″W	Van Cortlandtville	
94	Waccabuc Historic District	Waccabuc Historic District	July 28, 2015 (#15000236)	Mead St. & portions of Tarry-A-Bit Dr., Post Office & Chapel Rds. 41°17′26″N 73°35′43″W	Waccabuc	The district's 524 acres (212 ha) are the core of the Mead family landholdings around which the small hamlet of Waccabuc began developing in 1780, with many buildings from that and subsequent eras.
95	Washington School	Washington School	February 12, 1987 (#87000080)	83 Croton Ave. 41°09′56″N 73°51′30″W	Ossining	1907 school was first modern school in growing village. Monumentality achieved despite small size by Beaux-Arts style and placement on rise.
96	West Somers Methodist Episcopal Church and Cemetery	West Somers Methodist Episcopal Church and Cemetery	October 25, 2011 (#11000755)	199 Tomahawk St. 41°19′51″N 73°45′04″W	Somers	1837 chapel-style Greek Revival church with nearby graves of settlers from that era, one of the few remnants of when West Somers was a thriving community. Maintains historical integrity despite extensive renovations.
97	Williams–DuBois House	Williams–DuBois House	May 25, 1989 (#89000463)	Grace Ln. and Pinesbridge Rd. 41°11′06″N 73°49′41″W	New Castle	1780 house is only known one from that era in town with gambrel roof
98	Witthoefft House	Witthoefft House	February 22, 2011 (#11000039)	11 Tallwood Rd. 41°07′48″N 73°44′13″W	Armonk	
99	Yorktown Heights Railroad Station	Yorktown Heights Railroad Station	March 19, 1981 (#81000419)	Commerce St. 41°16′16″N 73°46′49″W	Yorktown Heights	1877 station is one of only three New York and Putnam Railroad stations remaining in county, and one of only two of this size.
100	Isaac Young House	Isaac Young House	August 20, 2004 (#04000876)	114 Pinesbridge Rd. 41°11′43″N 73°49′00″W	New Castle	1872 Second Empire house built over earlier farmhouse in rural area, unusual for that style. Maintains high level of integrity.

== Former listing ==
	Name on the Register	Image	Date listed	Date removed	Location	City or town	Description
1	George Rohr Saloon and Boardinghouse		December 1, 1978 (#78001924)	August 20, 1981	1-3 Highland Ave.	Ossining	Currently a parking lot for the Trinity Episcopal Church

== See also ==
- National Register of Historic Places listings in New York
- National Register of Historic Places listings in Westchester County, New York
