= Merestead =

Historic house in New York, United States

- U.S. National Register of Historic Places
- Location within New York Location within the United States
- Location: Byram Lake Rd., Mount Kisco, New York
- Coordinates: 41.178325°N 73.704424°W
- Area: 136 acres (55 ha)
- Built: c.1850, c.1907
- Architect: Delano & Aldrich
- Architectural style: Georgian Revival
- NRHP reference No.: 84003431
- Added to NRHP: September 27, 1984

Merestead, also known as the former Sloane Estate, is a historic home located at Mount Kisco, Westchester County, New York.

== History ==
It was the country estate of William Douglas Sloane, president of W. & J. Sloane. It includes a neo-Georgian mansion completed in 1907. It was designed by Delano and Aldrich and is a 2 1/2-story, rectangular mansion with open porches on the ends and a 1 1/2-story service wing. Also on the property are 12 other contributing buildings: a garden house (c. 1907), two garages (c. 1907), carriage house, (c. 1907), a tenant house (c. 1850), cow barn (c. 1907), stable (late 19th century), storage / playhouse building (early 20th century), and four small shed / outbuildings date to about 1900.

It was added to the National Register of Historic Places in 1984.

=== Current ownership ===
The 130-acre Merestead property, which included the 28-room mansion and art collection, was deeded to Westchester County by Margaret Sloane Patterson and Dr. Robert Lee Patterson Jr. in 1982. The county took full possession of the property in 2002. The county recently approved a $2.05 million fund to repair the mansion. Tours of the mansion are offered on a limited basis by appointment only.

== See also ==
- National Register of Historic Places listings in northern Westchester County, New York
