= Sarles' Tavern =

Historic commercial building in New York, United States

- U.S. National Register of Historic Places
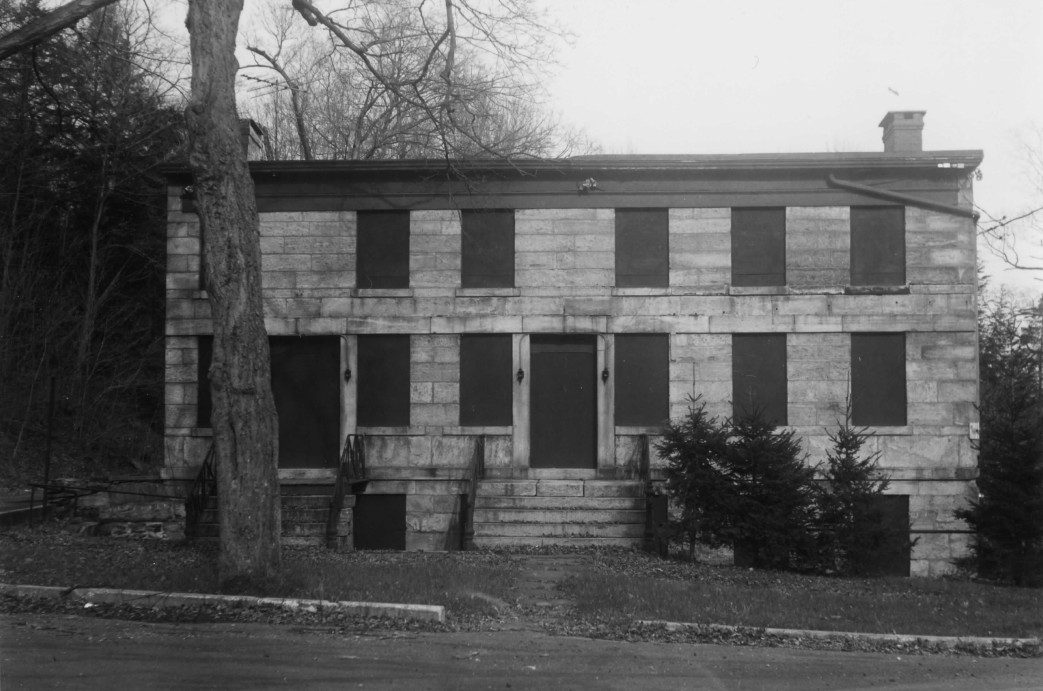
- The tavern, 1979

- Location within New York Location within the United States
- Location: NY 100, Millwood, New York
- Coordinates: 41°11′31″N 73°47′56″W
- Area: 0.6 acres (0.24 ha)
- Built: 1814-1817
- Architect: Crasto, David G.
- Architectural style: Greek Revival
- NRHP reference No.: 79001647
- Added to NRHP: December 31, 1979

Sarles' Tavern, also known as Granite House, was a historic inn and tavern building located at Millwood, Westchester County, New York. It was built between 1814 and 1817 and was constructed of locally quarried granite. It was a two-story, rectangular building with a low pitched gable roof in a restrained Greek Revival style.

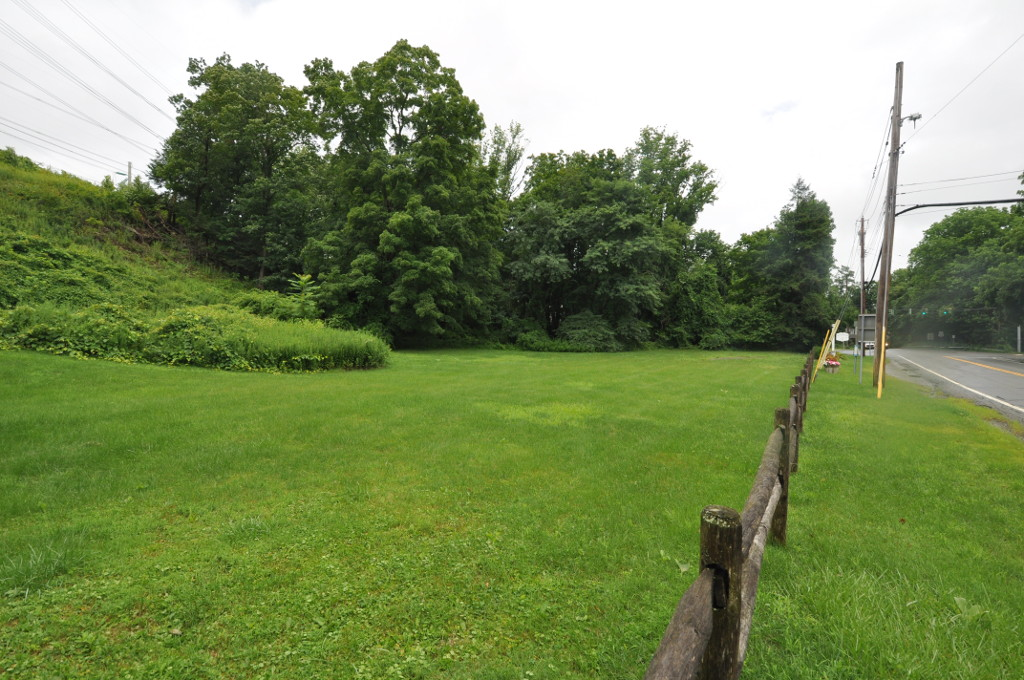
Location where the tavern stood, 2018

The property was sold in 1817 by David Crasto to William Sarles, who renamed the property Sarles Tavern. Sarles operated the property as a stagecoach stop for the route from White Plains to Somers until his death in 1853. After Sarles' death the building was run as a tavern by his sons until it was sold to the Merritt family, which ran it as an inn until the early 1900s. The property's name was then changed to Merritt's Corners.

The building was demolished in 1993 after the interior was consumed by fire; The building was unusable.

It was added to the National Register of Historic Places in 1979.

== See also ==
- National Register of Historic Places listings in northern Westchester County, New York
