= United Methodist Church and Parsonage (Mount Kisco, New York) =

Historic church in New York, United States

- U.S. National Register of Historic Places
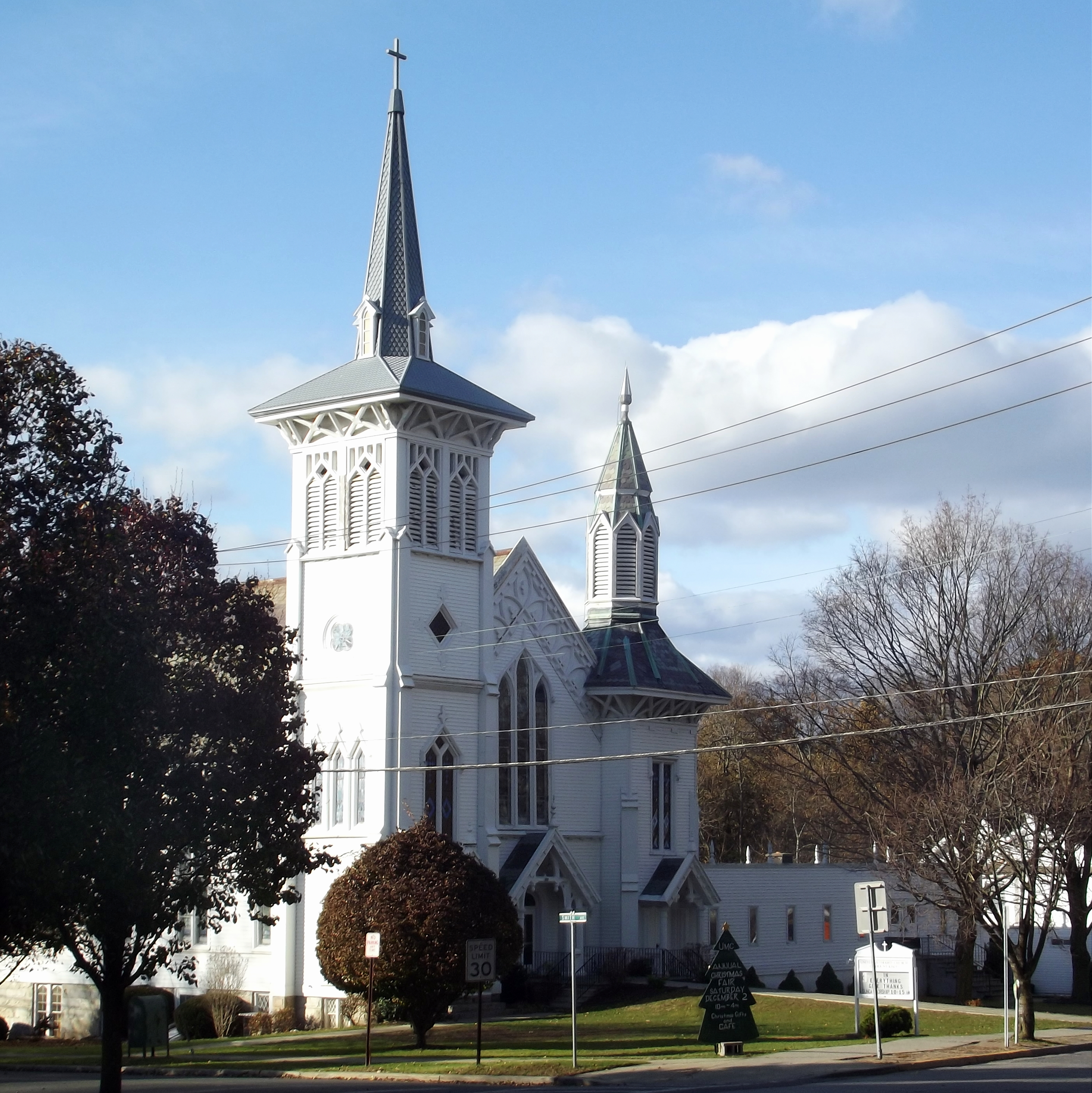
- United Methodist Church, November 2017

- Location within New York Location within the United States
- Location: church:300 E. Main and parsonage: 31 Smith Ave., Mount Kisco, New York
- Coordinates: 41°12′0″N 73°43′35″W
- Area: 2 acres (8,100 m^{2})
- Built: 1868 (church) and 1871 (parsonage)
- Built by: Edward Dauchey
- Architect: J. King;
- Architectural style: Carpenter Gothic (church); Victorian (parsonage)
- NRHP reference No.: 82001278
- Added to NRHP: November 4, 1982

The United Methodist Church and Parsonage are a historic United Methodist church and its adjacent historic parsonage located on a 2-acre tract on the corner of East Main Street and Smith Avenue in Mount Kisco, Westchester County, New York. The New Castle Methodist Episcopal Church was designed by J. King in the Carpenter Gothic style of architecture and built in 1868 by Edward Dauchey, while the parsonage, designed in the Victorian style of architecture, was built in 1871. Today the church is known as the United Methodist Church of Mt. Kisco. On November 4, 1982, both the church building and the parsonage were listed on the National Register of Historic Places as a single filing.

== Church ==
Built in 1868 by Edward Dauchey, and designed by J. King in the Carpenter Gothic style of architecture, the church building is located at 300 East Main Street. Its Carpenter Gothic features include a steep sloping roof, a board and batten front facade, many lancet windows, a lancet covered front entrance in a side belfry, all of which are typical of such churches. Unlike most of them, it also features a second smaller tower on the other front corner, steeples on each of the two towers, a total of 3 lancet covered entrances on its front facade: one in each tower and one in the center. Its slate roof is also unusual for such churches. Additions to the church building are the 1938 Halstead Memorial Hall on the rear and the 1958 one-story Education Building on one side. Although the additions are not Carpenter Gothic in style, they were designed to complement rather than detract from the original church's style. Exterior changes to the 1868 church include installing aluminum siding of the rear and sides and replacement in 1980 of the larger steeple with one of similar design but 10 feet shorter. Interior changes made to provide space for a pipe organ and a loft for the choir.

Mount Kisco United Methodist Church in approximately 1908

== Parsonage ==
Built in 1871 and located at 31 Smith Avenue next to the church, the parsonage is a 3-story irregularly-shaped Victorian-style house with some Carpenter Gothic features. The third floor consists of a mansard-like roofing system punctuated by side gables, each of which has a single window. In the 1960s many repairs were made to bring the house up to date.

== See also ==
- National Register of Historic Places listings in northern Westchester County, New York
