= Tarrytown Light =

Lighthouse in New York, United States

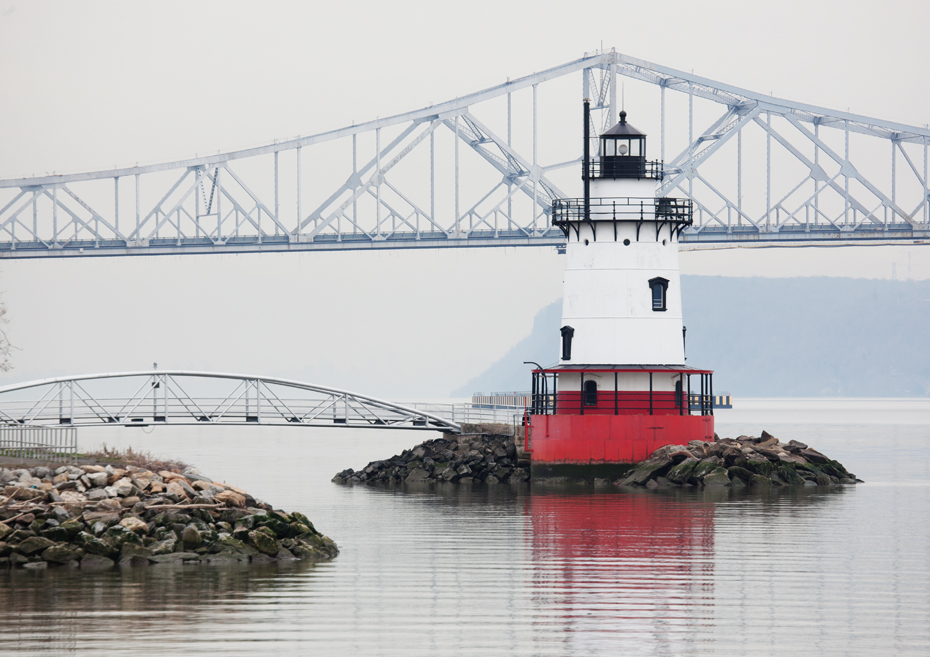
- Tarrytown Light with the original Tappan Zee Bridge in the background, 2011
- Location: Hudson River south of Kingsland
- Coordinates: 41°5′2.6″N 73°52′27.3″W

Tower
- Constructed: 1883
- Foundation: Stone pier/Cast iron caisson
- Construction: Cast iron
- Automated: 1957
- Height: 60 feet (18 m)
- Shape: Conical
- Markings: White w/ Black trim and red base
- Heritage: National Register of Historic Places listed place
- Fog signal: Bell 20s, later 30s

Light
- First lit: 1883
- Deactivated: 1961–2015
- Focal height: 56 feet (17 m)
- Lens: Fourth-order Fresnel lens
- Intensity: 7000 cp (1883–1957); 1500 cp (1957–61)
- Range: 13 nautical miles (24 km; 15 mi)
- Characteristic: F. W (1883–94); F. R (1894–1902); Fl. R (1902–61)
- Tarrytown Lighthouse
- U.S. National Register of Historic Places
- MPS: Hudson River Lighthouses TR
- NRHP reference No.: 79001649
- Added to NRHP: May 29, 1979

Tarrytown Light, also known as Kingsland Point Light and Sleepy Hollow Light, is a sparkplug lighthouse on the east side of the Hudson River in Sleepy Hollow, New York, United States. It a conical steel structure erected in the 1880s. In 1979 it was listed on the National Register of Historic Places.

The need for a lighthouse to warn ships away from the shoals near the common route off Tarrytown and Ossining had been obvious by the mid-19th century. But high land values at two favored locations led the federal government to instead build it 1/2 mile (0.80 km) offshore. It was the only family station on the lower Hudson, the only conical steel lighthouse on the Hudson to have living quarters within it rather than attached to it, and the only lighthouse in Westchester County. It remained in use until the mid-20th century; the construction of the Tappan Zee Bridge on the shoals where it stood and the development of the General Motors Tarrytown Truck Assembly plant on land reclaimed from the river to its east made the light obsolete. Today it is part of a county park, and tours are available.

== Building ==
The lighthouse is situated just off the riverbank at the southern end of Kingsland Point Park. A 100-foot (30 m) pedestrian bridge and riprap breakwater connects it to the shore. To its immediate east is a large residential development, once the site of the General Motors North Tarrytown Assembly plant. Between it and the waterfront sections of Tarrytown are the tracks used by Metro-North Railroad's Hudson Line, Amtrak's Empire Service, and CSX freight. The three-mile–long (5 km) Tappan Zee Bridge carries the New York State Thruway across the river a mile (1.6 km) to the south.

The building itself is a five-story conical structure on a foundation of a stone pier and cast iron caisson, that holds a concrete cylinder which accounts for half the lighthouse's weight, securing it in the river bottom. It is faced in welded steel plates. The base is painted red, the tower white, and the lantern room black. There are eight windows at alternating intervals on the second and third stories, eight portholes evenly spaced around the fourth story, and glazed glass around the lantern room. A catwalk, with a roof supported by iron columns, encircles the first story and provides access to the main entrance. Two additional catwalks are located around the fifth floor and the lantern room; the latter has a decorative iron railing. A flagpole rises from the fifth-floor catwalk's east side.

Inside, the entrance leads to the main living area, an 18-foot-wide (5.5 m) living room and kitchen. Above them, the second and third stories, both 15 feet (4.6 m) wide, had bedrooms. The wall interiors are faced in brick to better insulate them. The fourth floor, currently empty, was divided between a bedroom and workspace for machinery repair. Its ceiling has glass inserts to allow light from the lantern to filter down into it. From it a ladder leads up to the watch area and lantern room. The 1,000-pound (450 kg) fog bell remains there. In the cellar are the original coal shed and cistern. A central column carries the cables and 50-pound (23 kg) weight that rotate the lantern.

A security gate on the mainland and a mesh fence on the catwalk were added as part of a major restoration project that was completed in 2024.

== History ==
Navigational aids had been part of travel on the river since before Europeans had arrived, and the hazardous shoals near the Tarrytowns had long been known. But even after the growth in commerce fueled by industrialization during the 19th century, it took a considerable amount of time to find a site for the lighthouse. It remained in service until the Tappan Zee Bridge's construction made it redundant; since then expansion of the shoreline has also ended its isolation.

=== Prehistory–1882: The need for Hudson River lighthouses ===
The various Native American peoples who lived along its banks used the river European settlers would later name after Henry Hudson, the first of them to explore it, for commerce and trade. They were aware of the navigational hazards it offered their canoes, and built bonfires on the shores nearest tricky currents and hidden shallows. Colonists followed them as first sailing ships, then steamships, carried goods and passengers between New York City and the upper limit of navigable waters at Troy. Commerce sharply increased in the 1820s with the development of the Erie and Delaware and Hudson canals. The former connected the East Coast with the recently settled Midwest; the latter brought anthracite coal from Northeastern Pennsylvania to New York City. The development of the railroad in the mid-19th century took much, but not all, of this traffic, and river shipping continues today.

To assist the ships, 14 lighthouses were built at various navigational hazards along the river. Six of them besides Tarrytown remain, from Peter's Hook in Manhattan to Hudson–Athens south of Albany, between those two communities. The shoals a half-mile (1 km) off Tarrytown and Ossining (then known as Sing Sing) on the east bank of the river at the southern end of Haverstraw Bay were particularly dangerous as mariners preferred to use that side. In 1847 a location for a light was identified at Teller's Point, the southern tip of Croton Point just north of Ossining, at the north end of the shoal. That land was then used as a vineyard and its owner asked a higher price than the government was willing to pay. The following year Congress appropriated $4,000 ($149,000 in modern dollars) to acquire a different site near Tarrytown, at the end of Tarrytown Point, the peninsula created by the outflow of sediment from the Pocantico River. Steamboat captains consulted by the government suggested that the light should instead be located at Beekman's Point, two miles (3.2 km) away. Its owner likewise asked $3,000, which would not have left enough money to build the actual lighthouse.

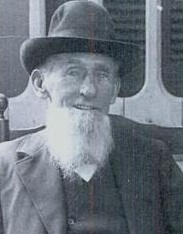
Jacob Ackerman

A red spar buoy marked the downriver end of the shoals in the meantime. Eventually, the current site, then offshore, was chosen. Construction began in 1882 at a cost of almost $21,000 ($701,000 in modern dollars). Stones were piled on the shoal as part of its foundation and a boat dock was built. The prefabricated sections of the 60-foot-tall (18 m) sparkplug lighthouse arrived on a barge; the structure was assembled using anchored boats and scaffolding. It would be the only one in Westchester County, the only conical steel structure of the seven to have living quarters and the only one on the lower Hudson that could house a keeper and his family. Its original white lantern, with a fourth-order Fresnel lens, could reportedly be seen up to 15 nautical miles (28 km; 17 mi) away.

=== 1883–1961: Active years ===
In 1883 it was formally lit. It was technically within the municipal boundaries of North Tarrytown (now Sleepy Hollow) but has been known as Tarrytown Light on navigational charts since its construction. Jacob Ackerman, a retired schooner captain who had become president (mayor) of North Tarrytown, was the first of ten keepers. He served in the position until his retirement in 1904, saving 19 lives during that time. In 1894, 11 years after it was lit, its lantern was changed from white to red. Over time it became a local landmark. "The Tarrytown Lighthouse is a familiar sight to the landsman, and its kindly warning rays are always welcomed by mariners", wrote local journalist Isaac De Goff in a 1902 guide to the area.

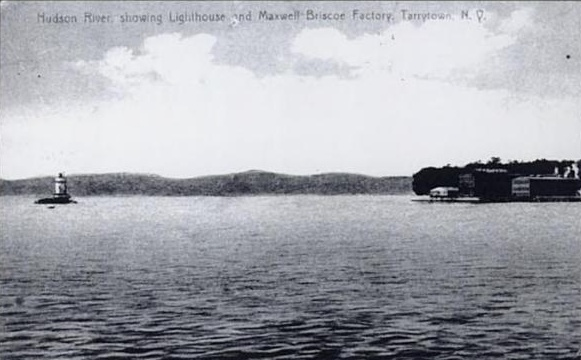
Early 20th-century postcard of lighthouse and shore

In 1902 the lantern was changed again from solid red to flashing. Apart from routine reinforcement to the riprap and replacement of the dock no changes were made to the lighthouse building itself until the 1940s, when modern sanitary facilities were added. In 1947, an electrical connection was installed, eliminating the need for the kerosene lamps that had provided routine illumination within the lighthouse. During the next decade, the original coal-fired steam heating system was replaced with modern forced air, and the sanitary facilities were further upgraded.

=== 1961–present: Deactivation and preservation ===
Around that time the Tappan Zee Bridge was built and opened to traffic. One of its piers, with its own set of navigational lights, sat on the shoals which the lighthouse had been designed to warn against, channeling shipping away from them. The Coast Guard responded by automating the light and reducing the flashing red lantern from 7000 candlepower to 1500 in 1957. The need for the lighthouse was further reduced two years later when the federal government declared all but the hundred feet (30 m) of river bottom around the lighthouse to be surplus property, so that General Motors (GM) could fill in the area between it and the shore in order to expand its Tarrytown Truck Assembly plant, a facility that incorporated the original Stanley Steamer factory built east of the railroad tracks in 1896. Two years later, in 1961, the light was decommissioned.

The lighthouse remained. In 1974, the county obtained an easement from GM to build a footpath from nearby Kingsland Point Park to the lighthouse. The following year it built the path, and a small bridge, allowing the public to walk from the park to the lighthouse. The county also acquired the lighthouse itself, a purchase that was disputed by the Coast Guard at the time of its listing on the National Register. Occasionally tours of the building were offered.

From 2022 to 2024, Westchester County undertook extensive restoration of the historic lighthouse that involved repairs to foundation masonry and the caisson base, waterproofing, and the replacement of windows, doors, and other damaged components with reproductions to maintain historical accuracy. A reproduction 4th-order Fresnel lens and the restored fog bell were upgraded to operational status. Interior and exterior walls were repainted and refinished. Some of the work, however, had to be repeated as the lighthouse was significantly damaged by an arson and vandalism incident in May 2024, just one month after the completion of the restoration project. (The four individuals involved in the act of vandalism had since been arrested and charged.) Public tours of Tarrytown Light began in October 2024.

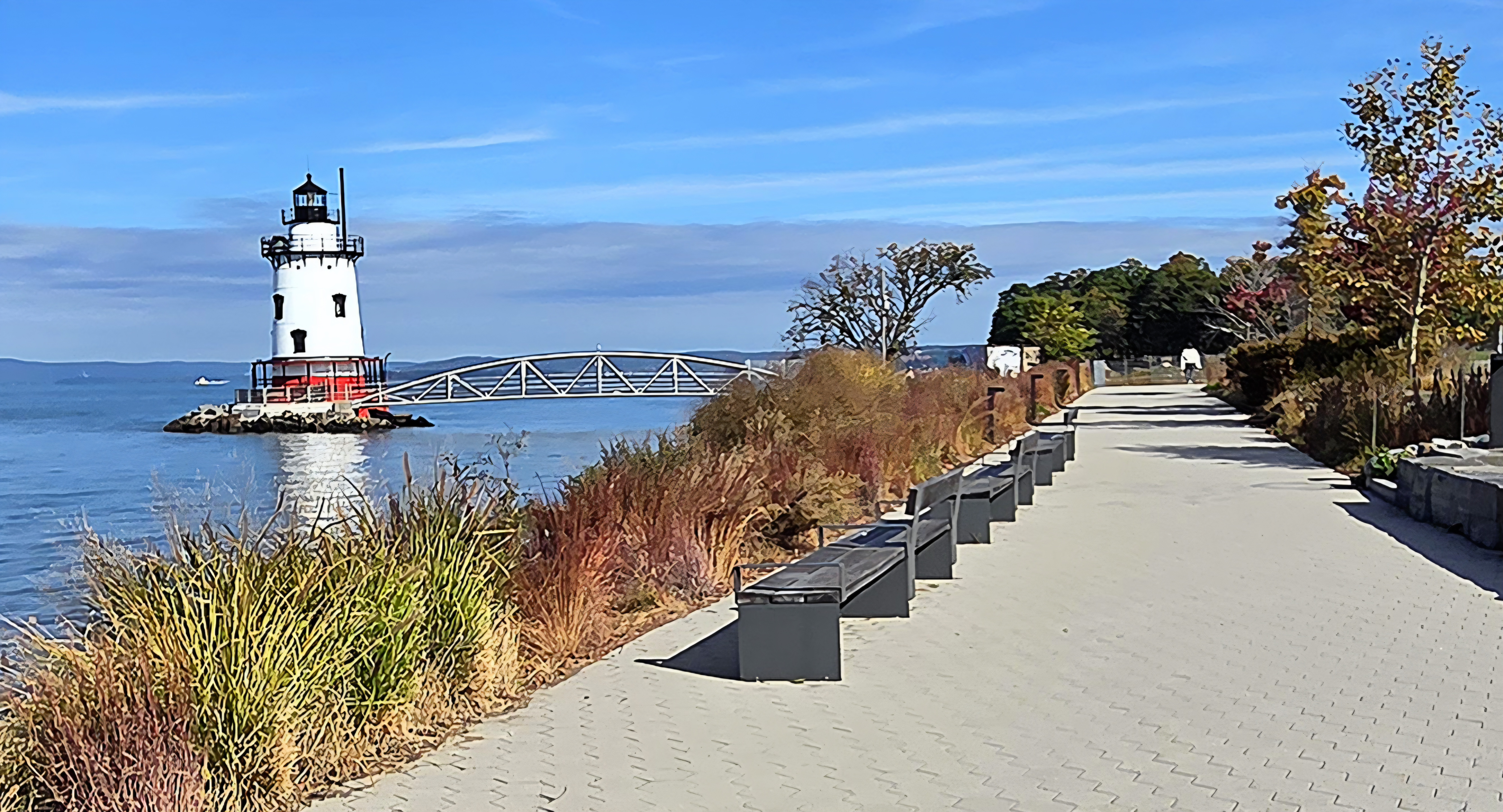
View of Tarrytown Light from the Westchester RiverWalk, with Kingsland Point Park in the background, 2025

The lighthouse is now part of Westchester County's Kingsland Point Park operated by the village of Sleepy Hollow.

== Operations ==
Original keepers such as Ackerman lived an austere existence. They kept a daily log of weather conditions, maintenance, and any significant events that occurred during the day. It was collected every month by the Lighthouse Service, and in later years, the Coast Guard, which absorbed the Lighthouse Service in 1939 with original keeper US Coast Guard William Osborne Sininger, his wife Lillian Letitia Christobal Smith Sininger and son William David Sininger being the first family living in the light house

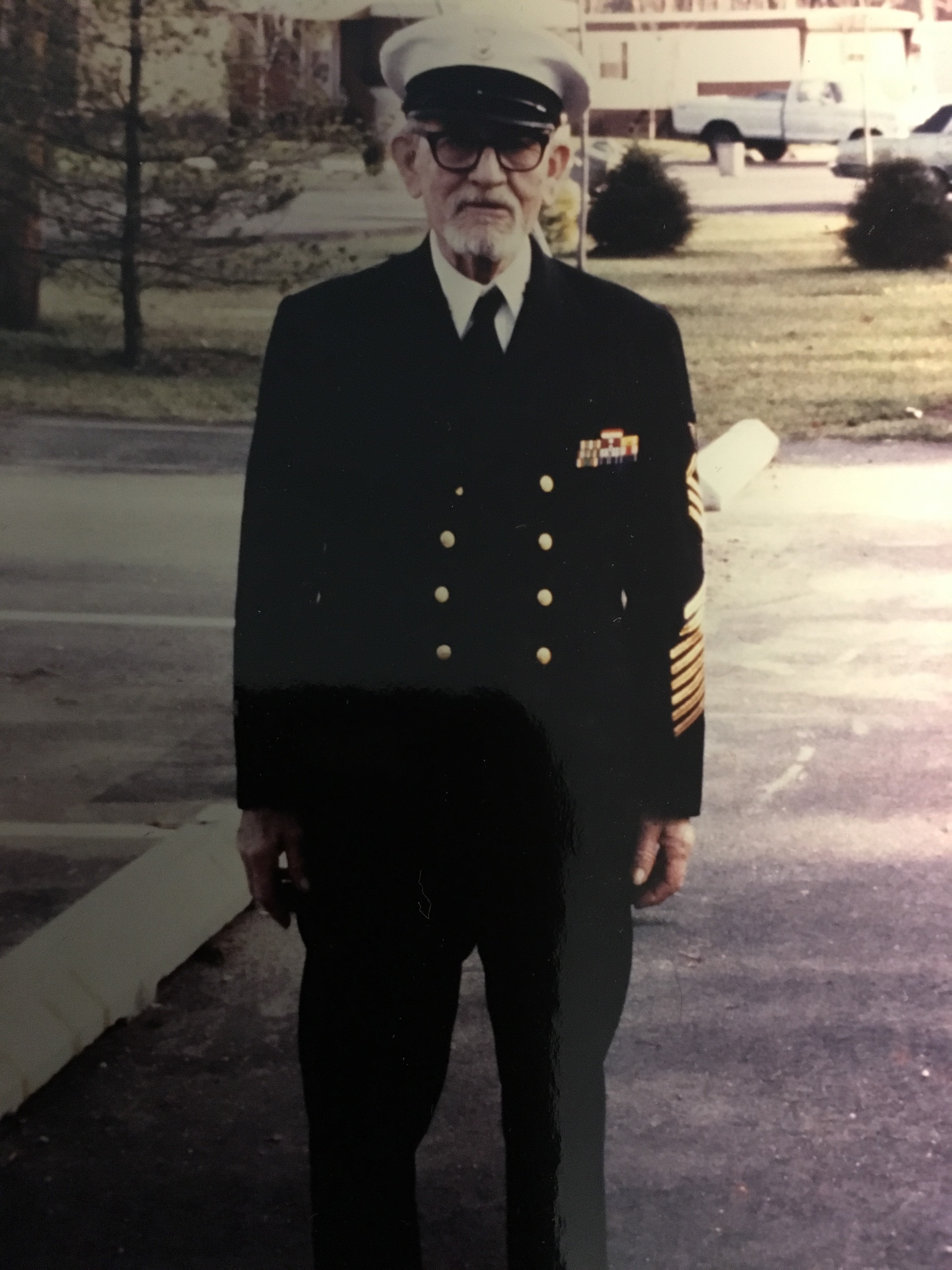
William Osbourne Sininger 1939-1941 US Coast Guard

A coal-fired furnace fed the steam-heating system. Water for bathing and drinking was initially collected from rains on the roof and stored in the basement cistern. Coal for refueling the furnace was dropped off by boat. All food had to be obtained by the keeper from land, either by boating to Tarrytown or walking across the ice (a potentially dangerous trip) in winter. The lantern and fog bell were powered by a battery; there was no other electricity in the lighthouse for its first 60 years. All lighting came from kerosene lamps.

In 1943, Laurent LeClerc moved in with his wife and three children. During their time, further amenities were introduced, such as household electricity, running water and modern forced air heating.

The LeClercs were succeeded by what became another family, the Morelands, who became the last keepers of Tarrytown Light. In 1955, the Coast Guard offered a 20-year-old recruit, Richard Moreland, the position. He moved in with his new wife, Agnes, an Irish immigrant who had been fascinated by the lighthouses near her home in her native country. During the two years they lived there, before the lighthouse was automated after the bridge was built, she gave birth to the couple's two daughters.

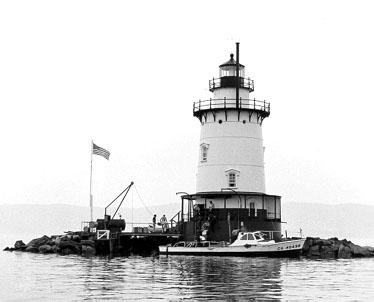
Tarrytown Light in its later years as an active lighthouse

The Morelands have spoken to journalists, including Edward R. Murrow, about family life in a lighthouse that was still, at the time, a half-mile from the nearest land. The Coast Guard supplied them with water, so they no longer needed to rely on the cistern, although it was still kept full. It was necessary to go back to the land at least every two days for milk, and they bought groceries every two weeks. The couple could never go out together as one of them had to remain at the lighthouse at all times. During one power outage, Richard Moreland hung an emergency kerosene lamp in the lantern house and rang the fog bell himself.

Other than the isolation, they found the most difficult aspect of living in the lighthouse to be making rectilinear furniture fit against the curved walls. For fun, they primarily watched television, or fished from the front door. Richard Moreland would occasionally swim in the river, with a rope tied around his waist so the currents would not carry him away. He said it was the best job in the Coast Guard since he did not have to pay for housing, and no traveling salesman came to call.

== See also ==
- National Register of Historic Places listings in northern Westchester County, New York
