= St. Mark's Cemetery =

Historic cemetery in New York, United States

- U.S. National Register of Historic Places
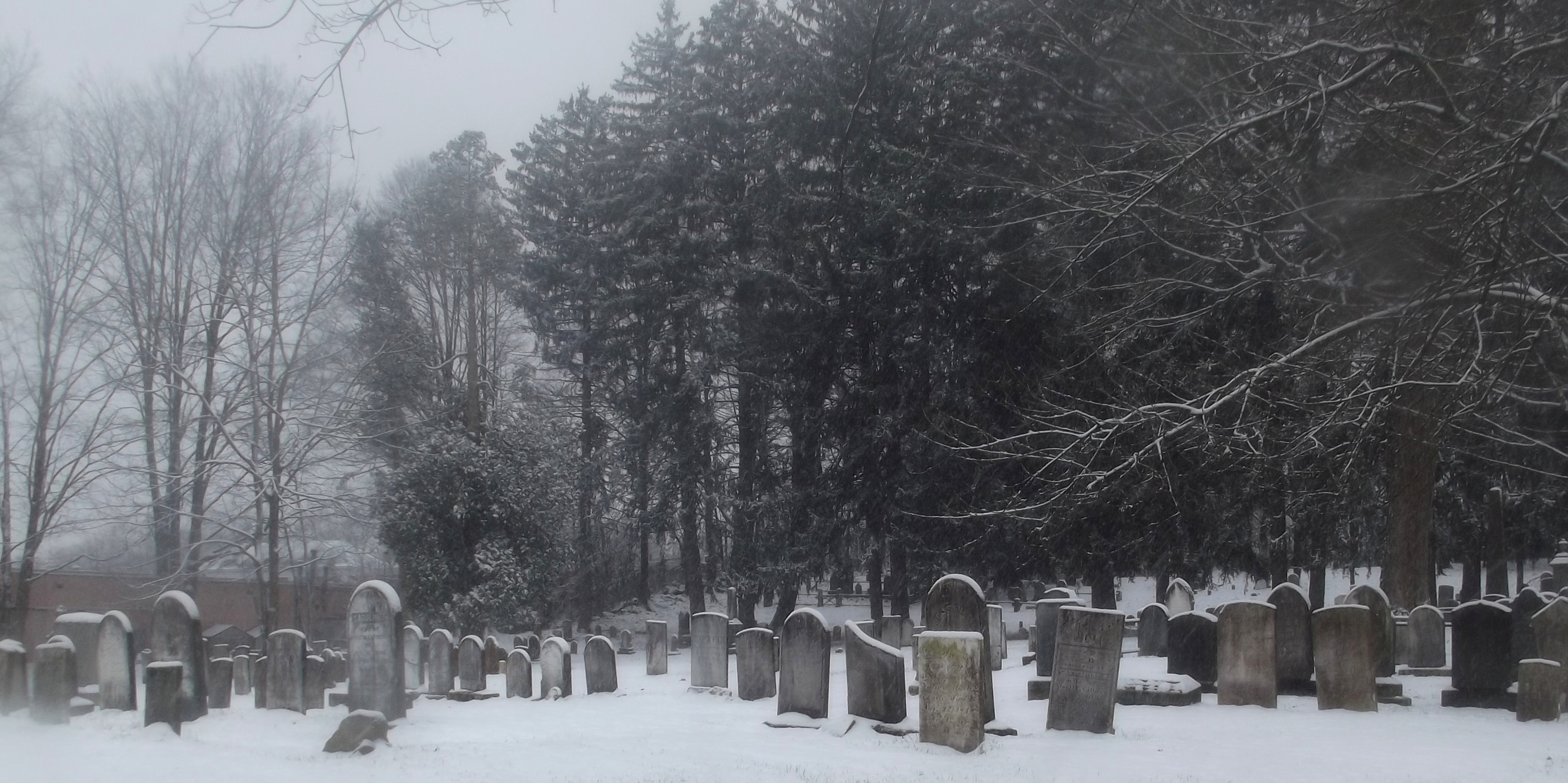
- St. Mark's Cemetery in December

- Location within New York Location within the United States
- Location: E. Main St., corner of St. Mark's Pl., Mount Kisco, New York
- Coordinates: 41°11′40″N 73°43′35″W
- Area: 1.3 acres (0.53 ha)
- Built: 1773
- Architect: Brown, Thomas; Et al.
- NRHP reference No.: 88000918
- Added to NRHP: June 23, 1988

St. Mark's Cemetery is a historic cemetery located on E. Main Street on the corner of St. Mark's Place in Mount Kisco, Westchester County, New York. The earliest section was established in 1761. The last burial was in 1940.

Established in 1761, St. Mark's Cemetery served as a burial place for the residents of what was formerly called North Castle and New Castle Corners. The eastern portion of the cemetery was the site of two different churches: St. George's, an Anglican church, from 1761 to 1818, and St. Mark's, an Episcopal church, from 1851 to 1916. The congregations of these two churches used the space around the houses of worship as a burial ground. Additionally, the New Castle Methodist Church, the forerunner of the present United Methodist Church of Mount Kisco, established its own burial ground on the west side of St. Mark's Church in 1854. Both St. Mark's Episcopal Church and United Methodist Church of Mount Kisco deeded their burial grounds to the Village of Mount Kisco in the 1970s, and the two burial grounds have since been jointly referred to as St. Mark's Cemetery.

The cemetery served as a burial ground for Revolutionary War soldiers and local citizens, and St. George's Church served as the site of a field hospital during the Battle of White Plains. General George Washington purportedly passed through Mount Kisco on November 10, 1776, as American troops were retreating from the Battle of White Plains to Peekskill. On what, at the time, was the Kirby estate, General Washington is said to have enjoyed his dinner seated on a large rock. The story of his evening meal has been handed down through the generations, and the rock is at the center of a small park about a half a mile southwest of the cemetery today.

The earliest surviving gravestone in the cemetery dates to 1773. Many of the early, gracefully proportioned stones were carved by a local stonemason whose name is lost to history, so he is known only as the "Mount Kisco Carver." These stones feature masterfully crafted lettering and "soul effigies"—winged, human-like angelic faces, symbolizing the soul’s flight to heaven (they are prevalently found in colonial burying grounds of New England and Central New York). Mount Kisco Carver's soul effigies are identified by their distinctive egg-shaped heads, delicate features, and poignantly gentle expressions.

St. Mark's Cemetery was listed on the National Register of Historic Places in 1988.

== See also ==
- National Register of Historic Places listings in northern Westchester County, New York
