= North Grove Street Historic District =

Historic district in New York, United States

- U.S. National Register of Historic Places
- U.S. Historic district
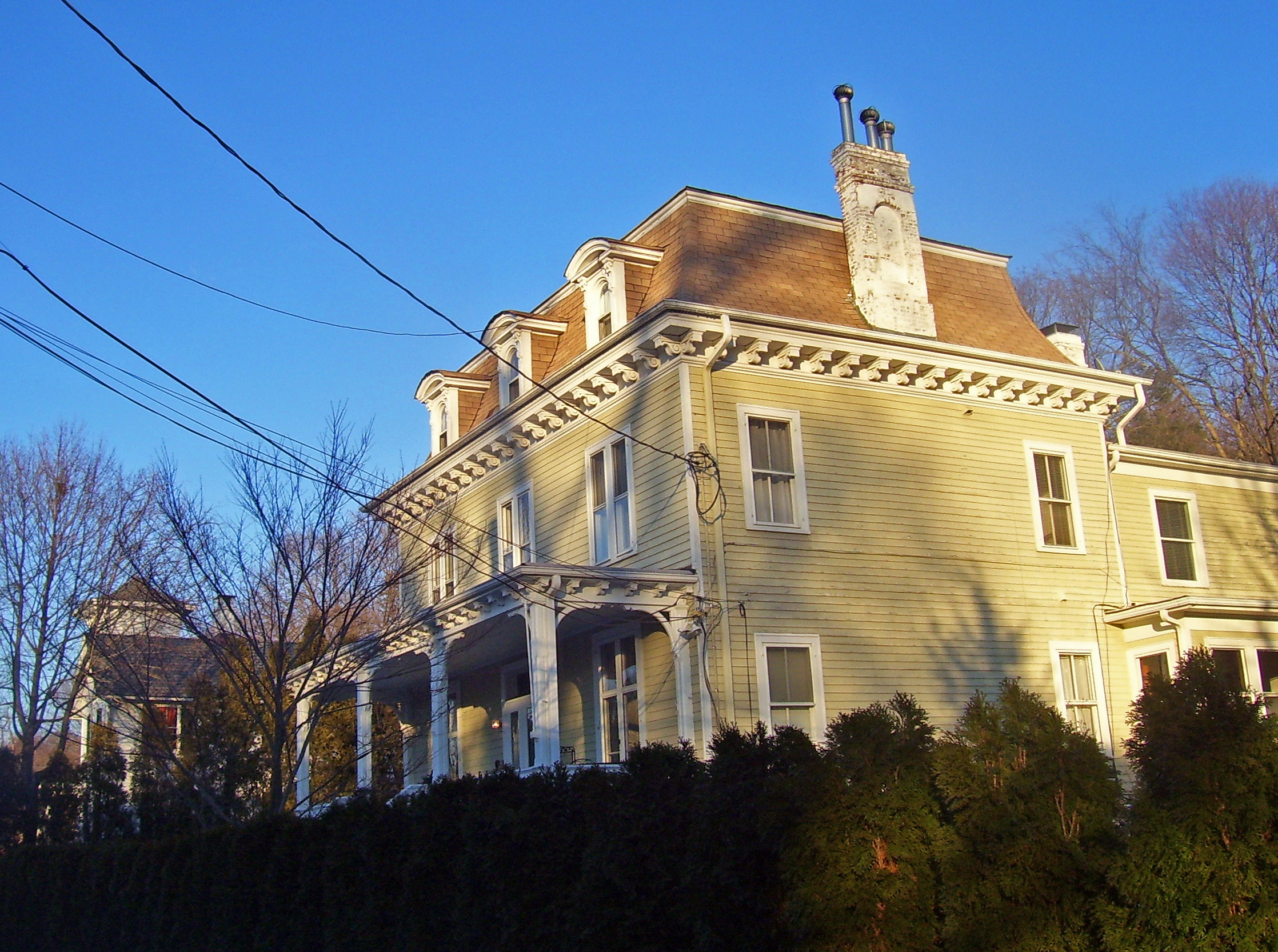
- 2 (left) and 8 North Grove Street, east and south elevations, 2009

- Location within New York Location within the United States
- Interactive map showing the location of North Grove Historic District
- Location: Tarrytown, NY
- Nearest city: White Plains
- Coordinates: 41°4′31″N 73°51′24″W
- Area: 1.5 acres (6,100 m^{2})
- Built: 1848–1868
- Architectural style: Second Empire, Gothic Revival, Italianate
- NRHP reference No.: 79001650
- Added to NRHP: March 13, 1979

The North Grove Street Historic District is located along the north end of that street in Tarrytown, New York, United States. It consists of five mid-19th century residences, on both sides of the street, and a carriage barn. In 1979 it was listed on the National Register of Historic Places.

The houses were built by wealthy residents in the middle of the 19th century, in the Second Empire, Gothic Revival, and Italianate architectural styles, when the area offered a view of the Hudson River to the west. Three were built by Jacob Odell, Tarrytown's first village president, and his descendants. They share some common architectural elements, and have survived relatively intact. Today three remain as private residences while the other two are home to the Tarrytown Historical Society.

== Geography ==
The district is located at the north end of North Grove Street, immediately south of Neperan Road, two blocks east the commercial buildings of South Broadway (U.S. Route 9), Tarrytown's main artery. To its immediate west is the walkway along the Old Croton Aqueduct, a National Historic Landmark. The neighborhood is residential, with most houses built during the 20th century. A large park is across Neperan north of the intersection. The district's terrain is level, with a steep hill rising to the immediate east.

The boundaries of the district are formed by the lot lines of the five houses within it. It encloses a 1.5-acre (6,100 m^{2}) area. The houses and the carriage barn are all considered contributing properties; a garage behind 1 North Grove is not.

== Buildings ==
1, 15 and 19, all brick, are located on the west side of the street; 2 and 8, both of wood, are opposite. The carriage barn is to the south of 8.

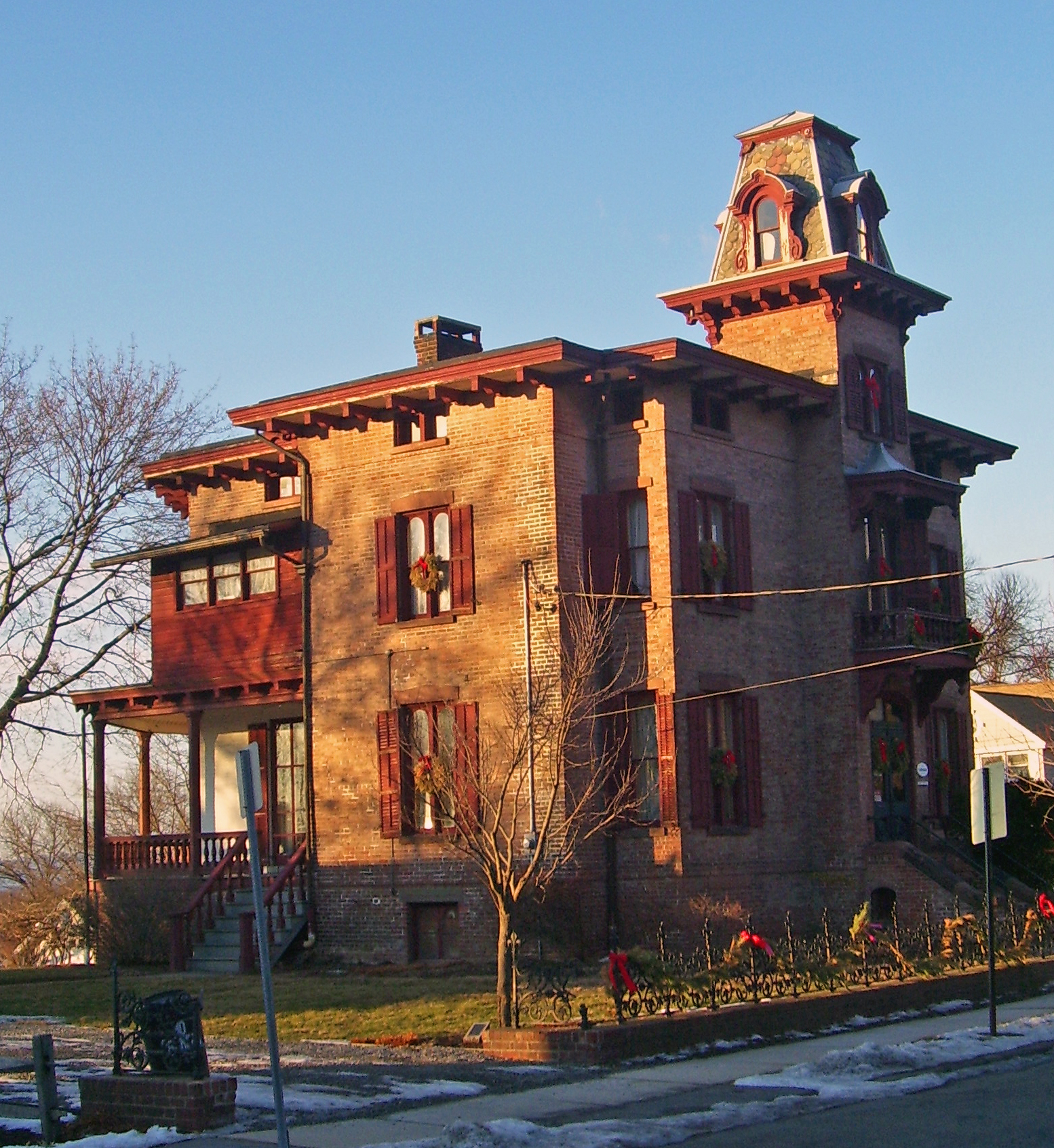
1 North Grove Street, east and south elevations

=== 1 North Grove Street ===
1 North Grove Street, at the southwest corner of the Neperan intersection, is a two-story, two-by-three-bay brick house with a flat roof pierced in its rear by a brick chimney. In the middle of the east (front) facade is a three-story tower, and a two-bay two-story projection with wraparound porch extends west from the rear. There is a decorative wrought iron fence along the sidewalk in front of the house, and a detached one-story garage is in the rear.

Fenestration consists of single and double one-over-one double-hung sash windows with vertical-board shutters and stone lintels and sills. The porch on the west wing has a wooden guardrail, and on the south side of the wing's second story is a small wooden shed-roofed addition. Just below the roofline are short eyebrow windows; the broad overhanging eave is supported by simple wooden brackets.

The main entrance and the window above it on the tower have wooden hoods. The tower itself is topped by a slate-shingled mansard roof pierced on all sides by round-arched dormers. Inside the house retains many of its original finishes, including marble fireplaces.

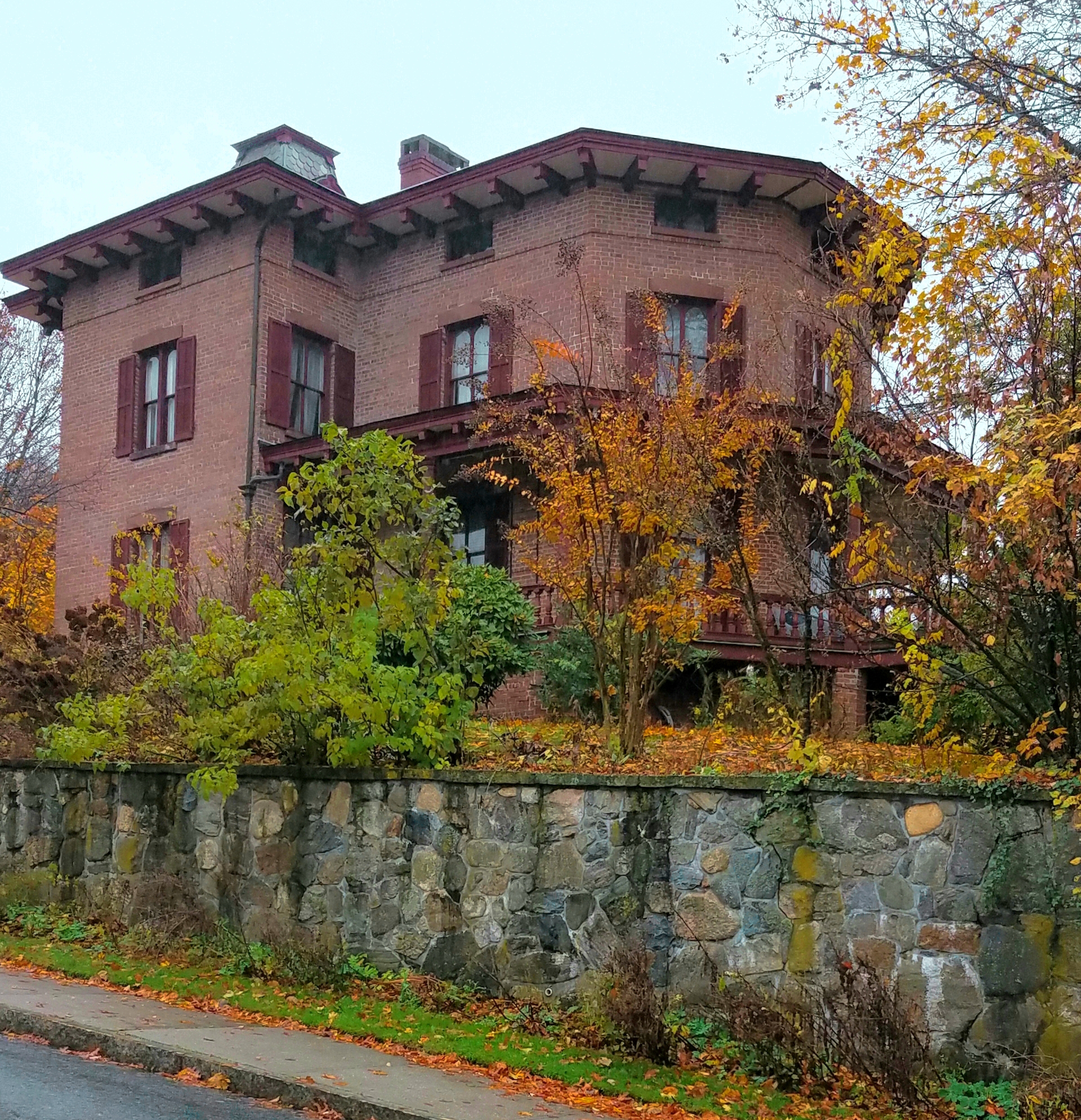
1 North Grove Street, west and north elevations

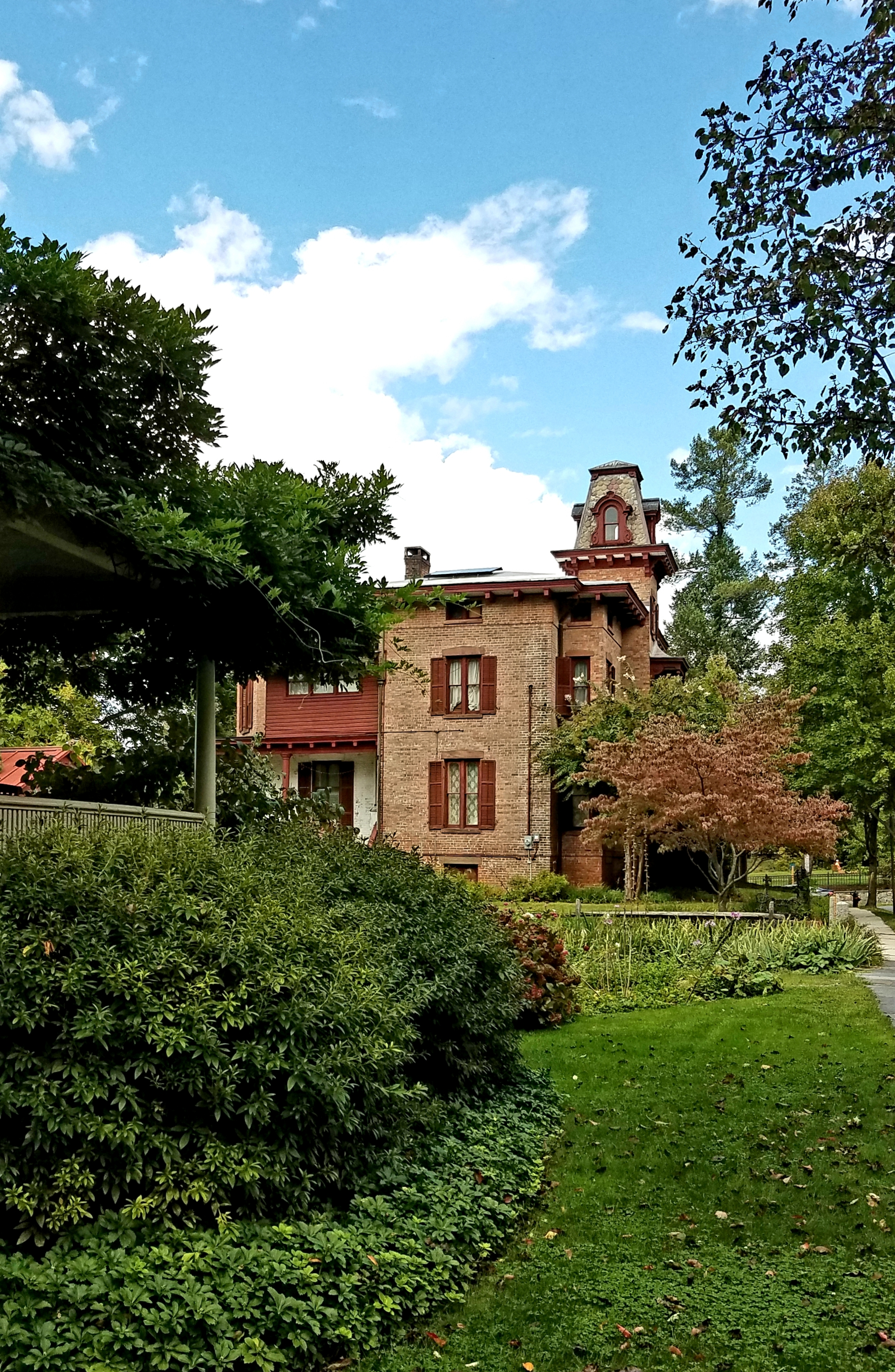
Street view

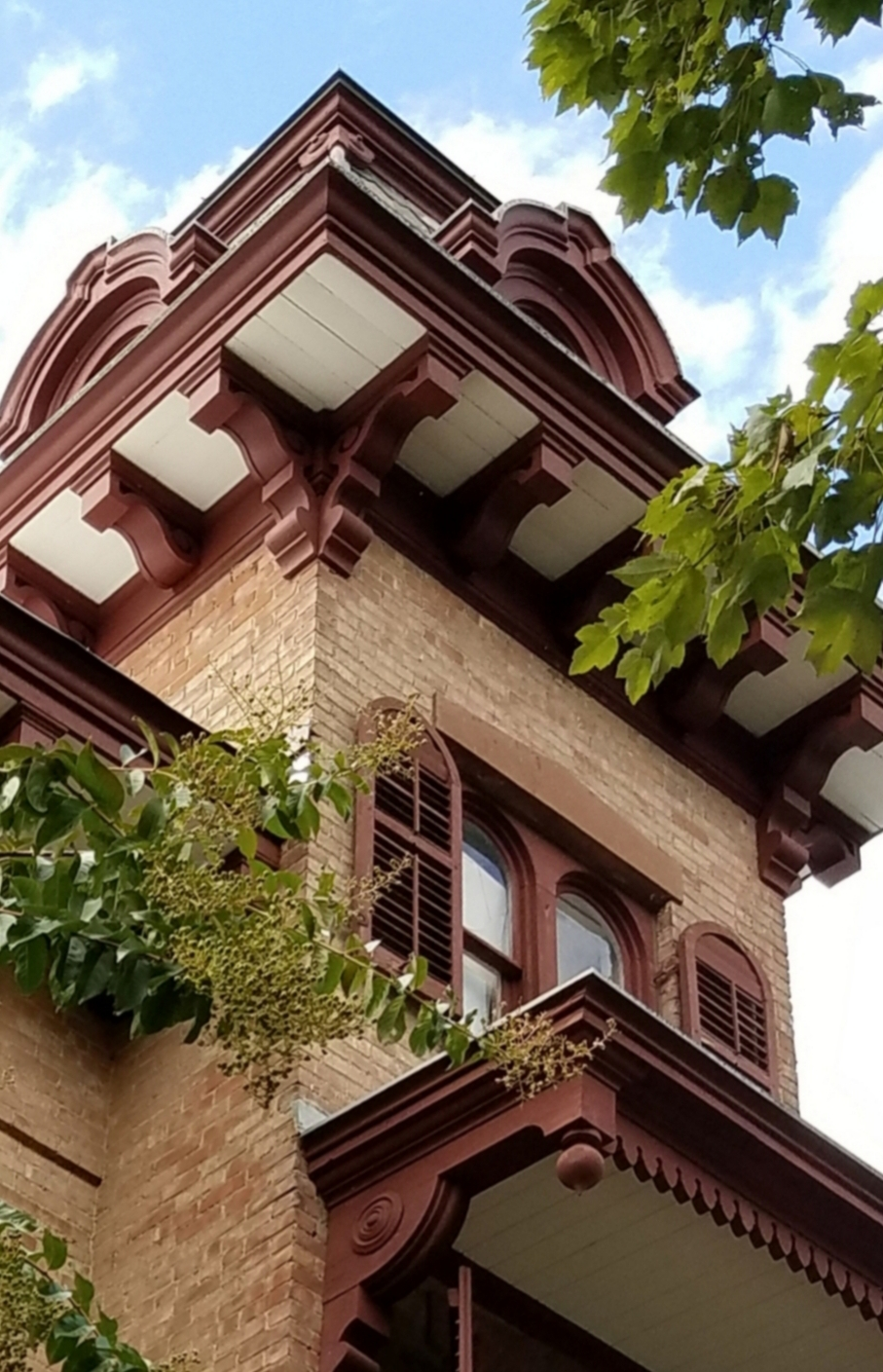
Architectural details of the tower

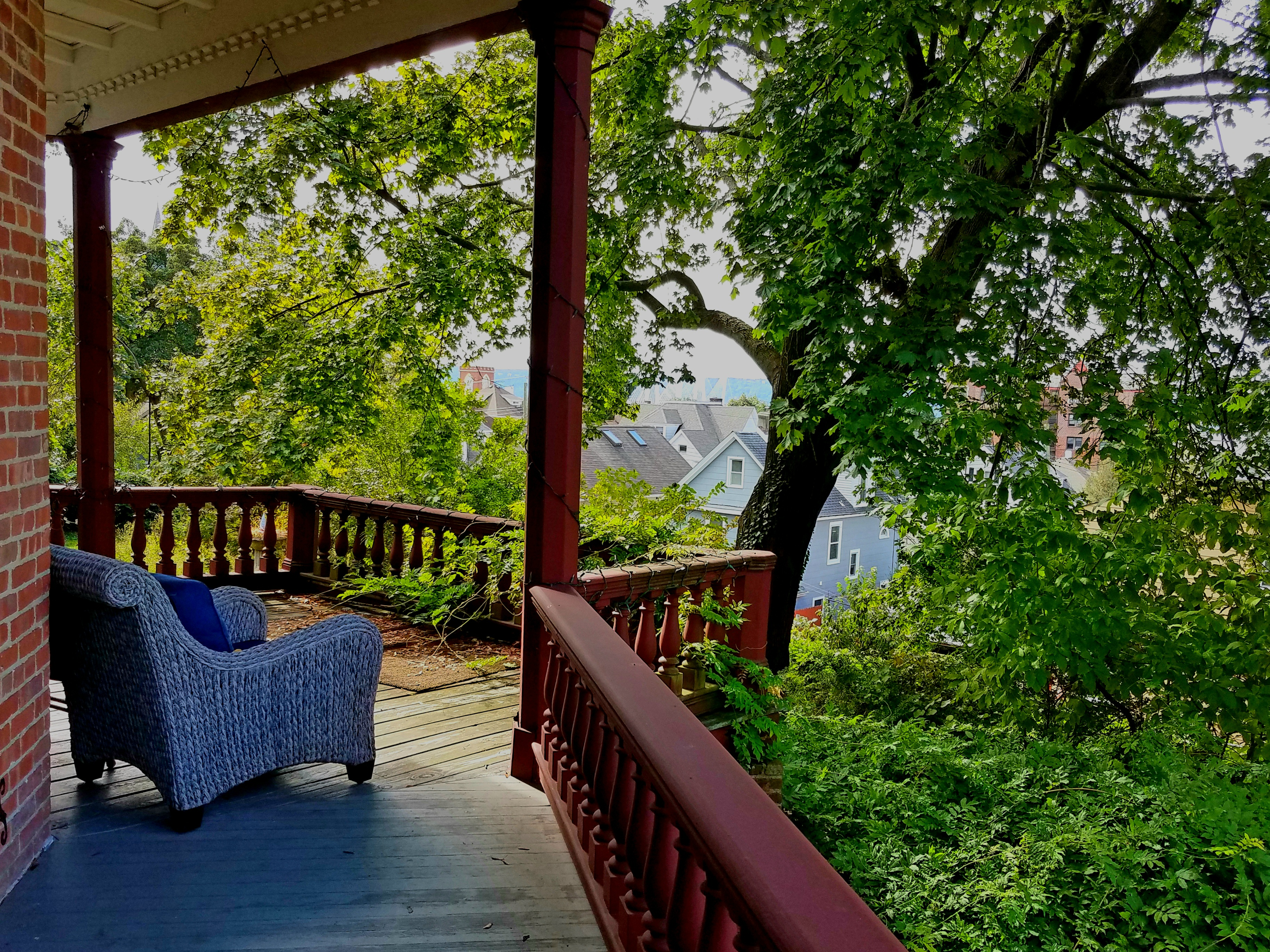
Wraparound porch

=== 15 North Grove Street ===
Two short driveways are located in the open space between 1 and 15 North Grove Street to the south. It, too, is a two-story brick house with flat roof, pierced by a single chimney, and attached tower (albeit on the west elevation). A two-story north wing is faced in simple shingles and a railed porch runs along the east facade, supporting a small deck above it.

All windows on 15 are also one-over-one double-hung sash, but with segmental-arched lintels. Some are on the three-sided bay windows that project from both the north and south profiles. The roofline is supported by decorative wooden brackets.

The tower is square, joined to the rear at a 45-degree angle. It has several double segmental-arched windows and a flat roof supported by brackets. On the interior are the original spiral staircase and door and window surrounds.

=== 19 North Grove Street ===
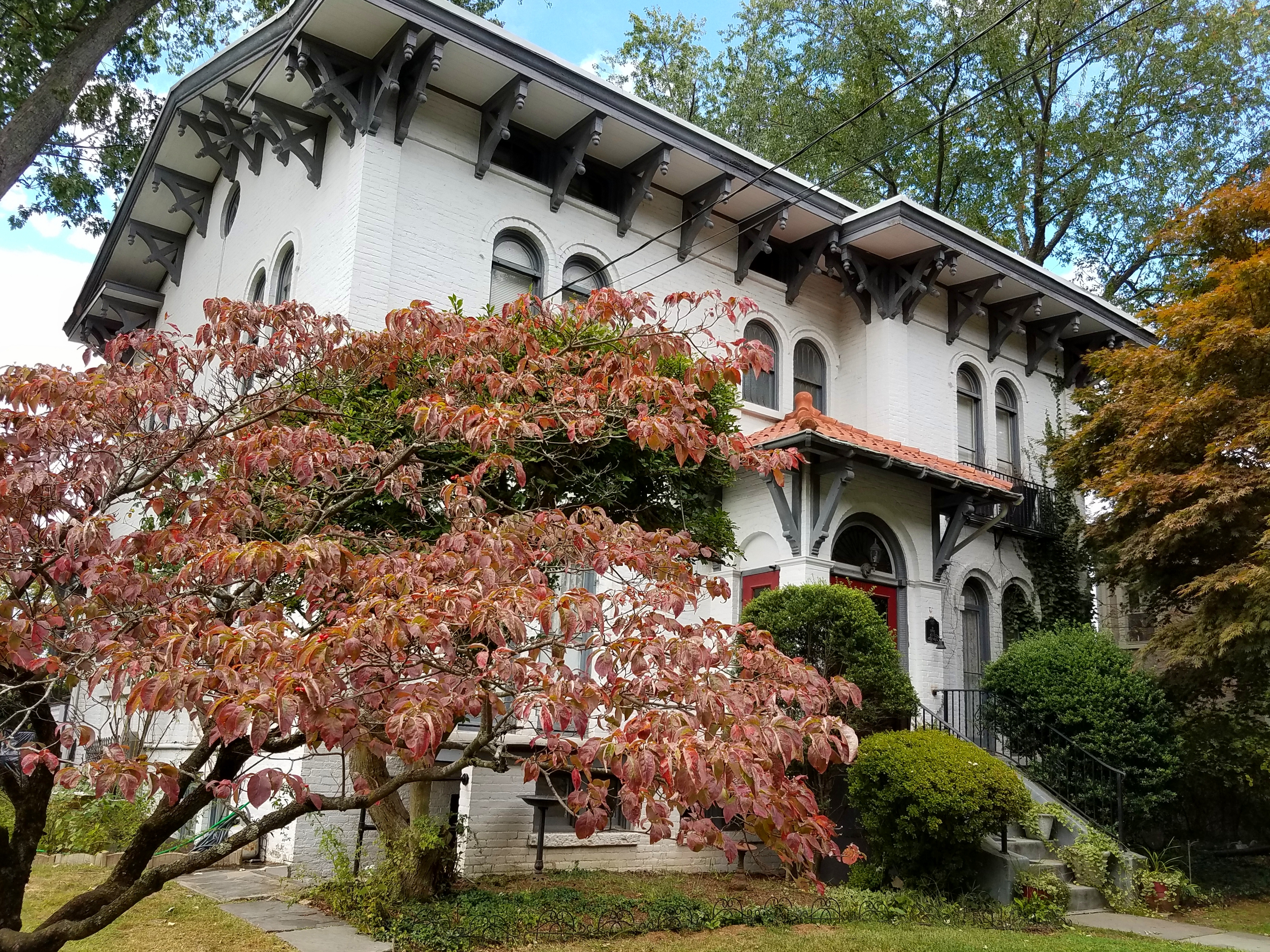
19 North Grove Street

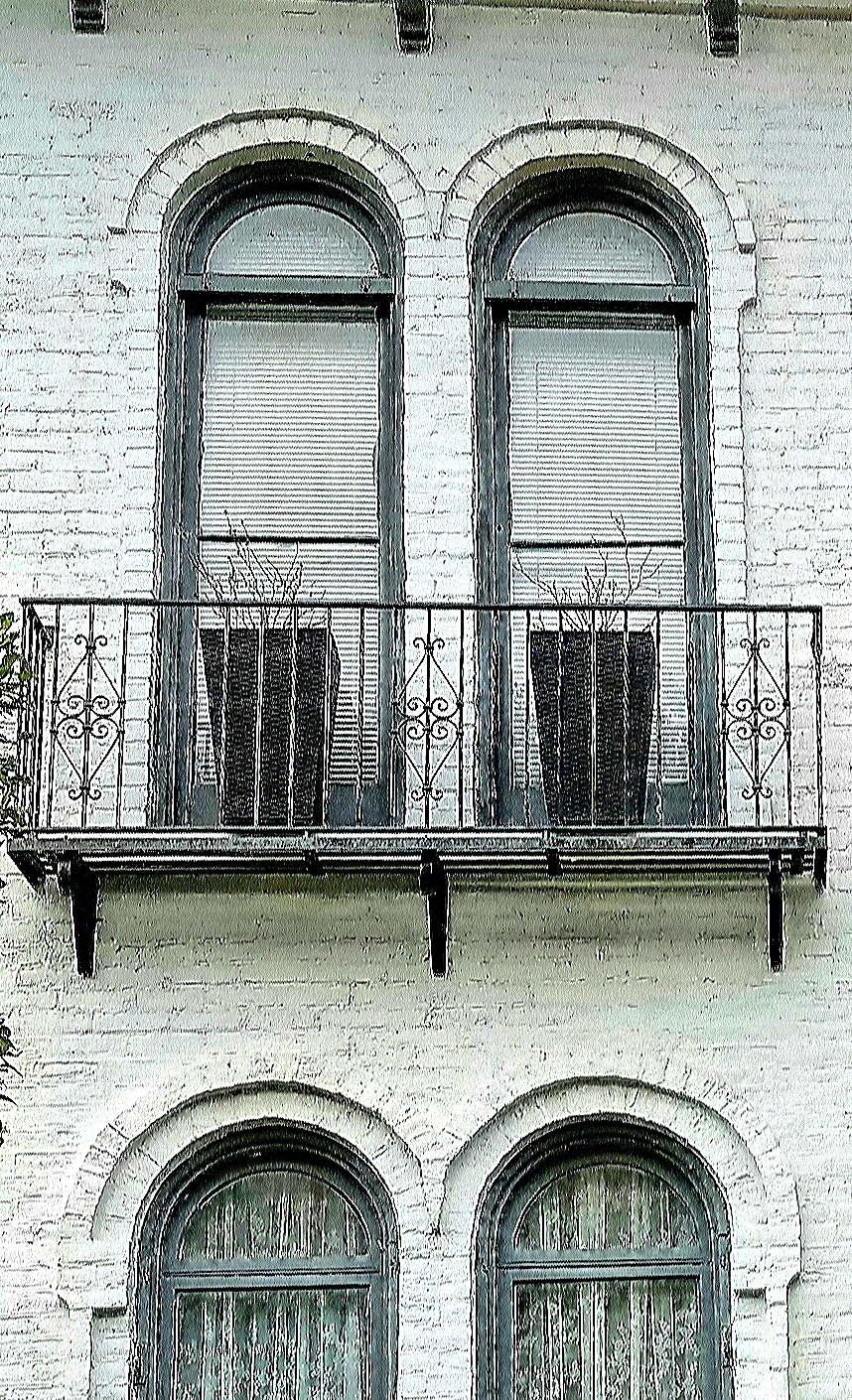
Second-story windows

Rounding out the west side of the street is 19 North Grove Street, also a two-story brick house with attached rear tower. It is distinguished from the other house by its three-by-two-bay configuration and low-pitched gable roof pierced by two chimneys with gauged decorative brickwork. An intricately detailed wooden porch runs the length of its west (rear) facade.

Windows are one-over-one double-hung sash with round-arched transoms, set singly or doubly. The flanking windows on the second story have small wrought iron balconies. In the center of the first floor is the main entrance, located in a projecting vestibule with a similar round-arched entrance and tiled hipped roof supported by brackets. Different brackets also support the overhanging eave.

The tower also has a gabled roof with brackets. Inside are many original finishes, including marble fireplaces and wooden door and window surrounds. It, too, retains the original spiral stair.

=== 8 North Grove Street ===
Across from 15 is the carriage barn and 8 North Grove Street. It is a wood frame three-by-two-bay house sided in clapboard. Atop is a slate-shingled mansard roof is pierced by three hooded round-arched dormers on the west and a brick chimney on the south end. A railed porch with flat roof runs the length of the west (front) facade. A later two-story kitchen wing extends from the east.

The windows are paired one-over-one double-hung sash on the west, single two-over-two on the side profiles and single one-over-one on the kitchen wing. On the north face of the kitchen is a bay window. The broad overhanging eaves of the porch and main roofs are supported by carved modillions. Original interior features include marble fireplaces and simple wooden door and window surrounds.

To the southwest, along the sidewalk, is the carriage barn, subsequently converted into an automobile garage. It is a wood frame two-story structure sided in clapboard and topped with a mansard roof shingled in asphalt, pierced by two gabled round-arched dormers set with two-over-two double-hung sash. The other windows are six-over-six. A garage door has been installed as the main entrance. Above it is a second-story loft door set in a larger gabled dormer.

=== 2 North Grove Street ===
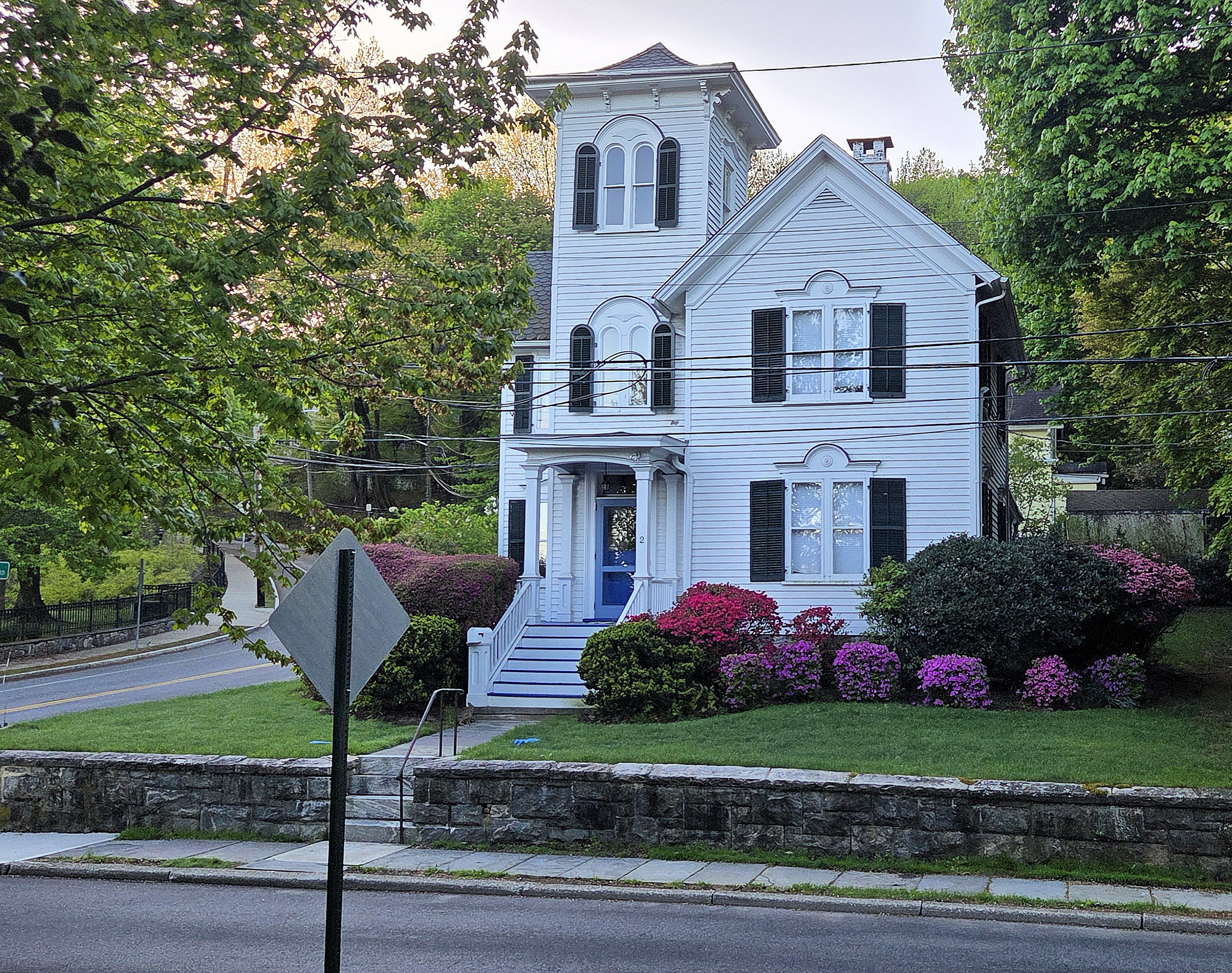
2 North Grove Street

A row of mature trees on the north property line separates 8 from 2 North Grove Street, on the southeast corner of the Neperan Road intersection. Like its southern neighbor, it is a two-story three-bay wood-frame house sided in clapboard. Like the brick houses on the other side of the street, it has an attached tower that rises an extra story.

The main block has a gable roof shingled in asphalt, complementing the tower's hipped roof with carved brackets. Shutter-flanked double and single round-arched one-over-one sash on some of its faces echoes the fenestration of 19 North Grove Street. Other windows, particularly on the main block's west facade, are rectangular with recessed round-arched panels in their entablatures. A small porch with flat roof supported by two wooden pillars shelters the main entrance, a single door with transom. The interior has heavy molded window and door surrounds.

== History ==
The oldest of the houses, 1 North Grove Street, was built by Jacob Odell, a successful local merchant who served as Tarrytown's first village president (a precursor to mayor), in 1848. He would later also serve as Greenburgh Town Supervisor. Eight years later the next house, 19 North Grove Street, was built on land formerly part of a large local estate.

In 1860, Odell built 15 North Grove Street as a wedding gift for his daughter. The same year Marcus Raymond, a local newspaper editor, built 2 North Grove Street. The last of the houses to be built was 8 North Grove Street, home to three generations of local physicians. The ground floor was used as their office.

The houses display a range of the architectural styles popular at the time, from the Italianate mode popular before the Civil War, combined with some elements of the Gothic Revival, to the Second Empire that flourished after the war. They have remained largely unaltered today. Most are still private residences; the Odell House at 1 North Grove is operated by the Historical Society of Tarrytown and Sleepy Hollow as a historic house museum.

== See also ==
- National Register of Historic Places listings in northern Westchester County, New York
