= South Salem Presbyterian Church Cemetery =

Historic cemetery in New York, United States

- U.S. National Register of Historic Places
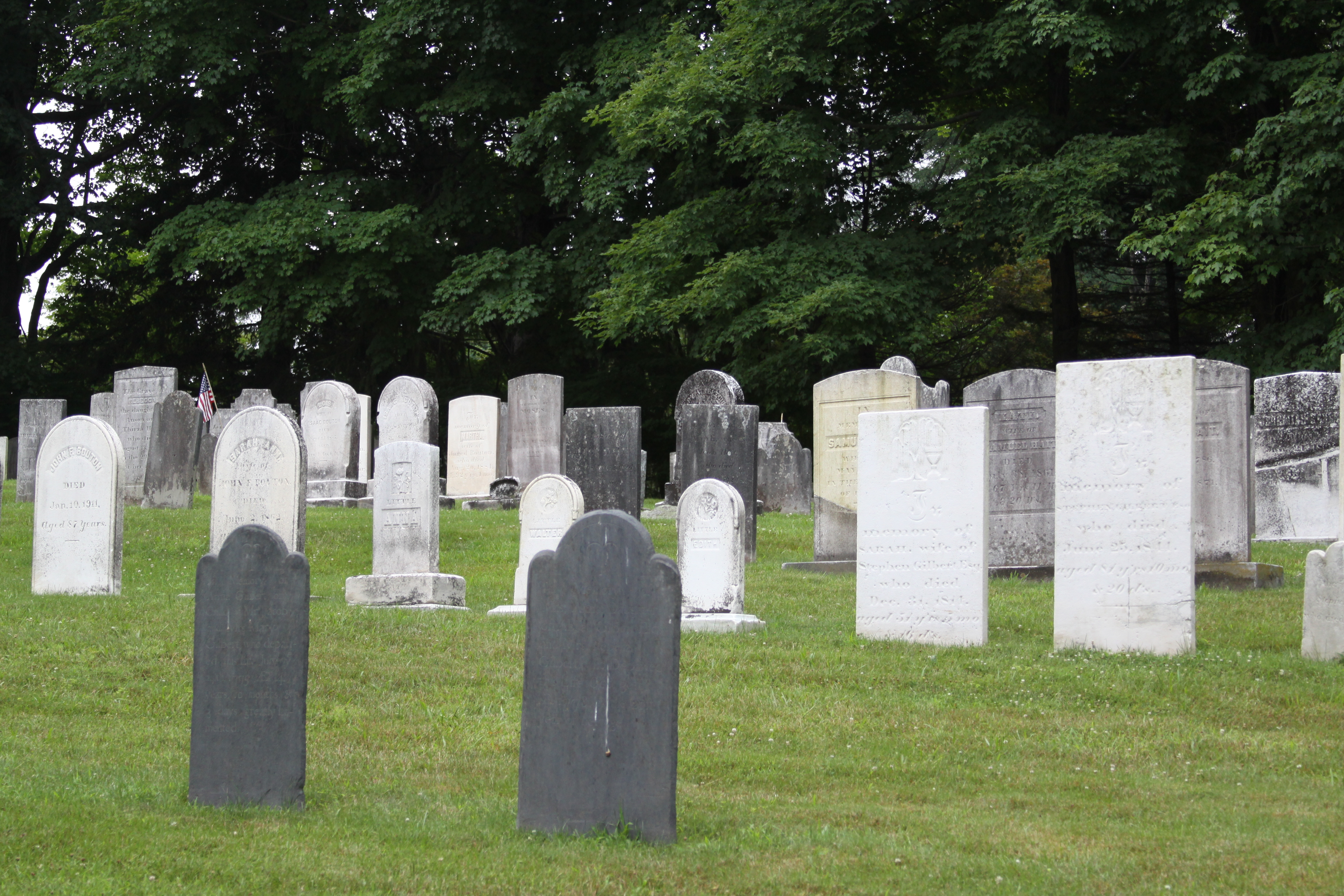
- South Salem Presbyterian Church Cemetery

- Location within New York Location within the United States
- Location: 111 Spring St., South Salem, New York
- Coordinates: 41°16′25″N 73°33′24″W
- Area: 1.26 acres (0.51 ha)
- Built: 1739–1928
- NRHP reference No.: 14000586
- Added to NRHP: September 10, 2014

South Salem Presbyterian Church Cemetery is a historic home located at South Salem, Westchester County, New York. The cemetery was established in the 18th century, perhaps as early as 1710. It has a total of 373 identified graves, ranging in date from 1739 to 1928. Burials include veterans of the French and Indian War, Revolutionary War and War of 1812. It includes a number of notable 18th and 19th century grave markers.

It was listed on the National Register of Historic Places in 2014.
