= Glenwolde Park Historic District =

Historic district in New York, United States

- U.S. National Register of Historic Places
- U.S. Historic district
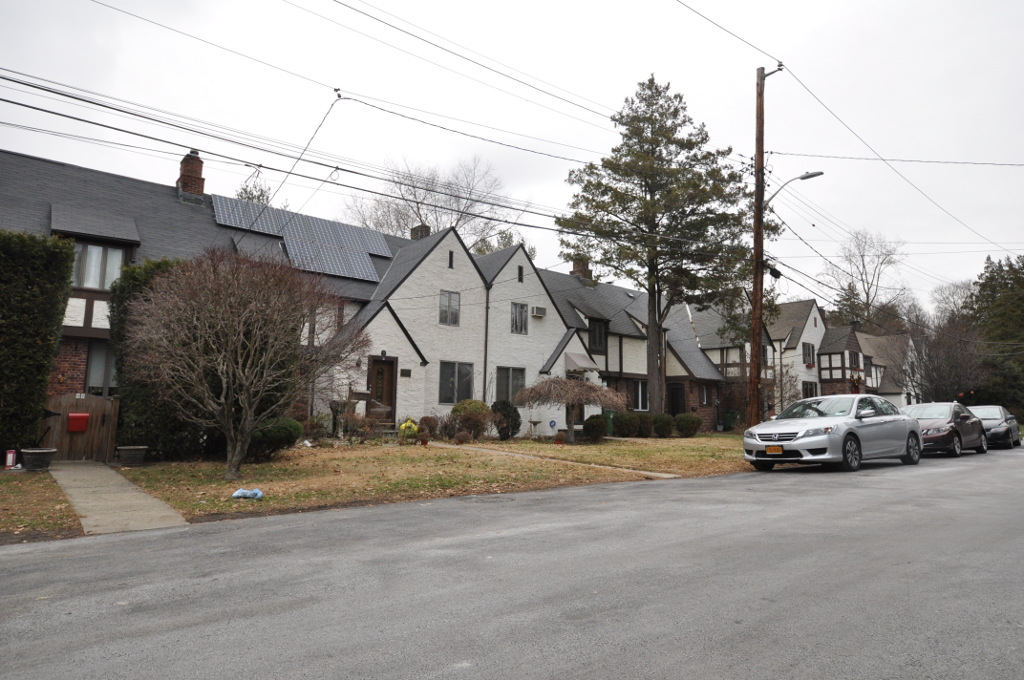

- Location within New York Location within the United States
- Location: Glenwolde Park, Walter St. & Willowbrook Ave., Tarrytown, New York
- Coordinates: 41°03′32″N 73°51′40″W
- Area: 4.18 acres (1.69 ha)
- Built: 1926
- Architect: King-Walsh Corporation
- Architectural style: Tudor Revival, Colonial Revival, Dutch Colonial
- NRHP reference No.: 14000542
- Added to NRHP: September 3, 2014

Glenwolde Park Historic District is a national historic district located at Tarrytown, Westchester County, New York. It encompasses 10 contributing buildings, 2 contributing sites, and 1 contributing structure in a distinctive residential enclave of Tarrytown. It was developed in 1926 and consists of a small number of attached and freestanding dwellings in the Tudor Revival, Colonial Revival, and Dutch Colonial style.

It was listed on the National Register of Historic Places in 2014.
