= Mount Kisco, New York =

Village and town in the United States

Mount Kisco
- Village and town
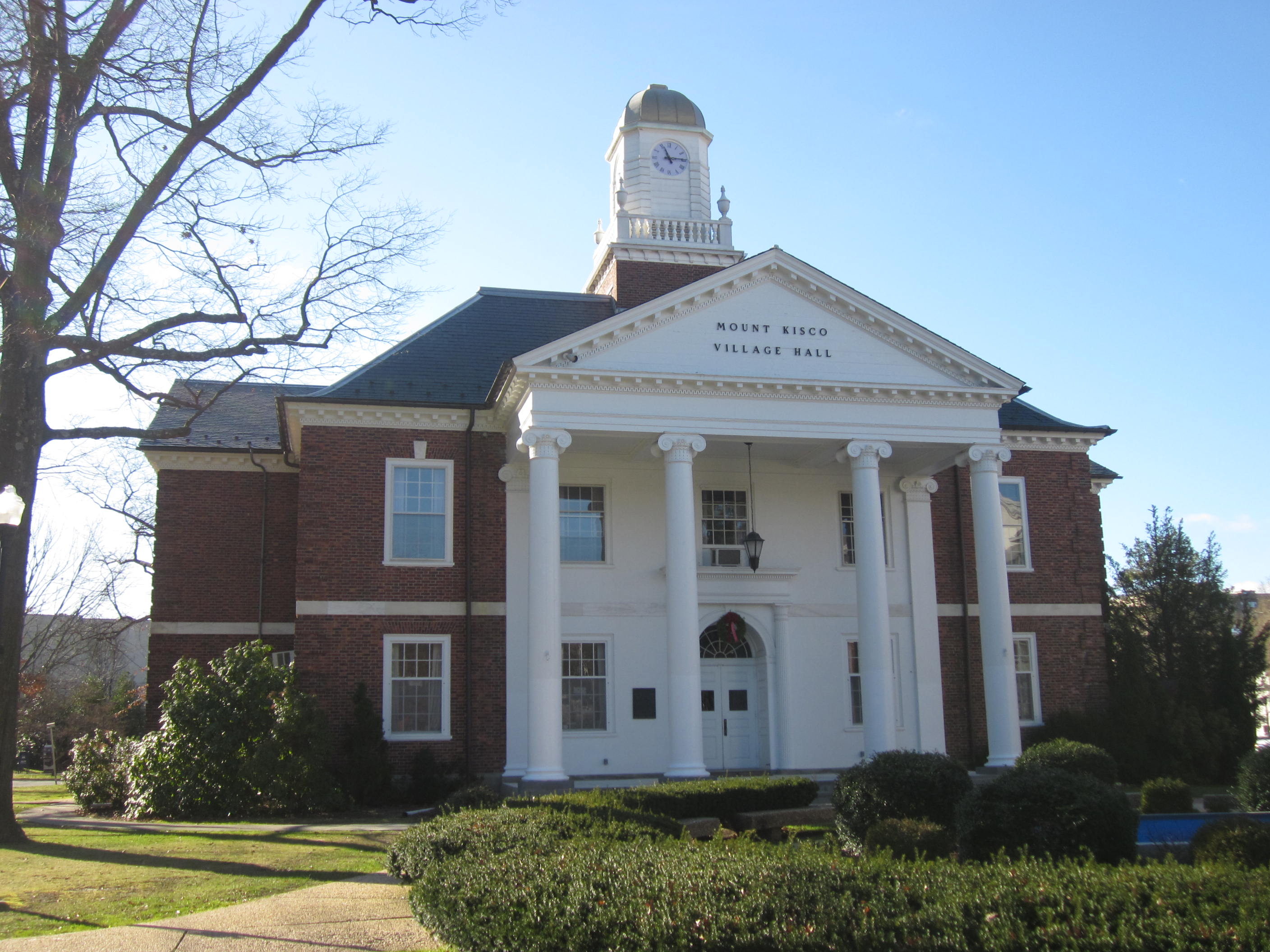
- Mount Kisco Village Hall

- Flag Seal

- Location of Mount Kisco, New York
- Coordinates: 41°12′14″N 73°43′50″W
- Country: United States
- State: New York
- County: Westchester

Government
  - Mayor: Michael Cindrich (VIP)

Area
  - Total: 3.07 sq mi (7.96 km^{2})
  - Land: 3.04 sq mi (7.88 km^{2})
  - Water: 0.031 sq mi (0.08 km^{2})
- Elevation: 302 ft (92 m)

Population (2020)
  - Total: 10,959
  - Density: 3,603.2/sq mi (1,391.21/km^{2})
- Time zone: UTC−5 (Eastern (EST))
  - Summer (DST): UTC−4 (Eastern (EDT))
- ZIP Code: 10549
- Area code: 914
- FIPS code: 36-48890
- GNIS feature ID: 0957852
- Website: www.mountkiscony.gov

Mount Kisco is a village and town in Westchester County, New York, United States. The town of Mount Kisco is coterminous with the village. The population was 10,959 at the 2020 United States census.

It serves as a significant historic site along the Washington–Rochambeau Revolutionary Route.

== History ==
The name Kisco may be connected to the Munsee word asiiskuw ("mud"), and the name of the settlement "first appeared in colonial records as Cisqua, the name of a meadow and river mentioned in the September 6, 1700 Indian deed to land in the area." The spelling Mount Kisko was used by the local postmaster when a post office was opened in the village sometime after 1850. The current spelling of the name was adopted in 1875, with the settlement's incorporation as a village. The town shares its name with the Kisco River, which traverses the town and goes into the New Croton Reservoir.

As a village, Mount Kisco originally was half in the town of Bedford and half in the town of New Castle. Mount Kisco became a town in its own right in 1978.

== Geography ==
According to the United States Census Bureau, the village has a total area of 3.1 square miles (8.0 km^{2}), all land.

=== Climate ===
Mount Kisco lies within the humid continental climate zone, experiencing four distinct seasons. Winter is cold, summer is warm and humid, and spring and fall are chilly to mild.

Climate data for Mt. Kisco, New York
Month	Jan	Feb	Mar	Apr	May	Jun	Jul	Aug	Sep	Oct	Nov	Dec	Year
Mean daily maximum °F (°C)	34 (1)	39 (4)	47 (8)	59 (15)	69 (21)	78 (26)	82 (28)	81 (27)	73 (23)	62 (17)	51 (11)	40 (4)	60 (15)
Mean daily minimum °F (°C)	19 (−7)	21 (−6)	29 (−2)	39 (4)	49 (9)	58 (14)	63 (17)	62 (17)	54 (12)	43 (6)	35 (2)	25 (−4)	41 (5)
Average precipitation inches (mm)	3.58 (91)	3.20 (81)	4.22 (107)	4.42 (112)	4.35 (110)	4.71 (120)	4.81 (122)	4.39 (112)	4.57 (116)	4.68 (119)	4.38 (111)	4.03 (102)	51.34 (1,303)

== Demographics ==
Historical population
Census	Pop.	Note	%±
1880	728		—
1890	1,095		50.4%
1900	1,346		22.9%
1910	2,802		108.2%
1920	3,944		40.8%
1930	5,127		30.0%
1940	5,941		15.9%
1950	5,907		−0.6%
1960	6,805		15.2%
1970	8,172		20.1%
1980	8,025		−1.8%
1990	9,108		13.5%
2000	9,983		9.6%
2010	10,877		9.0%
2020	10,959		0.8%
U.S. Decennial Census

As of the 2013 United States Census there were 11,067 people, 4,128 households, and 2,447 families residing in the village. The population density was 3,194.0 inhabitants per square mile (1,233.2/km^{2}). There were 4,103 housing units at an average density of 1,312.7 units per square mile (506.8 units/km^{2}). The large number of small businesses, retail stores, and financial and medical offices swells the daytime population to more than 20,000. The racial makeup of the village was 77.79% White, 5.99% African American, 0.28% Native American, 4.24% Asian, 9.03% from other races, and 2.67% from two or more races. Of the population 24.54% were Hispanic or Latino of any race.

There were 3,993 households, out of which 30.2% had children under the age of 18 living with them, 45.3% were married couples living together, 11.6% had a female householder with no husband present, and 38.7% were non-families. Of all households 31.7% were made up of individuals, and 10.0% had someone living alone who was 65 years of age or older. The average household size was 2.49 and the average family size was 3.09.

== Economy ==
Trans World Airlines at one time had its headquarters in eastern Mount Kisco. Carl Icahn moved the headquarters there in 1989 as the facility, two office buildings, was in proximity to his residence in Bedford. Each building had three stories. In 1993 the airline announced it would move its headquarters to St. Louis.

== Arts and culture ==
Mount Kisco Municipal Complex was added to the National Register of Historic Places in 1997. Merestead, St. Mark's Episcopal Church, St. Mark's Cemetery, and the United Methodist Church and Parsonage are also listed.

== Education ==
The school district is Bedford Central School District.

== Infrastructure ==
=== Transportation ===
There are several modes of transport in Mount Kisco.

- Metro-North Railroad: Mount Kisco, on the Harlem Line
- Bee-Line Bus System: Multiple routes
- The Westchester County Airport is nearby.
- New York State's Route 172, 117, 133
- The Saw Mill River Parkway and I-684 are nearby.

== Notable people ==
- Janet Adelman, Shakespearean scholar
- Harold Baker, Senior United States federal judge on the United States District Court for the Central District of Illinois
- Samuel Barber, composer
- Ann Blyth, actress
- Laura Branigan, singer
- Rick Carey, olympic swimmer
- Bennett Cerf, publisher, television personality
- Andrew Daly, actor, comedian
- Norman Dello Joio (born 1956), Olympic medalist equestrian
- Susan Dey, actress
- Bernard G. Ehrlich, National Guard major general, convicted in Wedtech scandal
- Michael Eisner, former CEO of The Walt Disney Company
- Lynn Emanuel, poet
- Arlene Francis, television and radio personality, actress
- Martin Gabel, actor, director, producer
- Lew Gallo, actor, producer
- Alexander Gode, linguist and translator
- Adam Green, musician
- Lillian Greneker, mannequin designer, inventor
- Kimiko Hahn, poet
- Caitlyn Jenner, television personality, author, athlete
- Joe LaSorsa, MLB pitcher for the Washington Nationals
- Gavin Macleod, Actor best known for The Mary Tyler Moore Show and The Love Boat
- Cyrus Margono, footballer
- Darin Mastroianni, MLB player for the Minnesota Twins
- John Jay McKelvey, Sr., attorney, founder of the Harvard Law Review
- Gian Carlo Menotti, composer, festival founder, life partner of Samuel Barber
- Eugene Meyer, financier, publisher of The Washington Post
- Agnes E. Meyer, journalist, philanthropist, civil rights activist, wife of Eugene Meyer
- Theodore Mook, musician
- William F. B. O'Reilly, political consultant
- Doane Perry, musician
- Ethan Russell, photographer
- Eric Schmertz, lawyer
- John Schneider, actor, country singer, co-founder of Children's Miracle Network
- Alex Shoumatoff, writer
- Bert Sugar, boxing writer, sports historian
- Arthur Ochs Sulzberger, Jr., publisher of The New York Times
- Rob Thomas, musician
- Chaim Michael Dov Weissmandl, rabbi
- Dar Williams, musician

== See also ==
- Neutral Ground of Westchester County in the Revolutionary War
