= Bedford, New York =

Bedford, New York, may refer to:

- Bedford (town), New York, a town in Westchester County
  - Bedford (CDP), New York, commonly known as Bedford Village, a hamlet (and census-designated place or CDP) in the town of Bedford
  - Bedford Hills, New York, a hamlet
- Bedford–Stuyvesant, Brooklyn, a neighborhood
  - Bedford, a neighborhood within Bedford–Stuyvesant
