= Stonecrest (Bedford Corners, New York) =

Historic house in New York, United States

- U.S. National Register of Historic Places
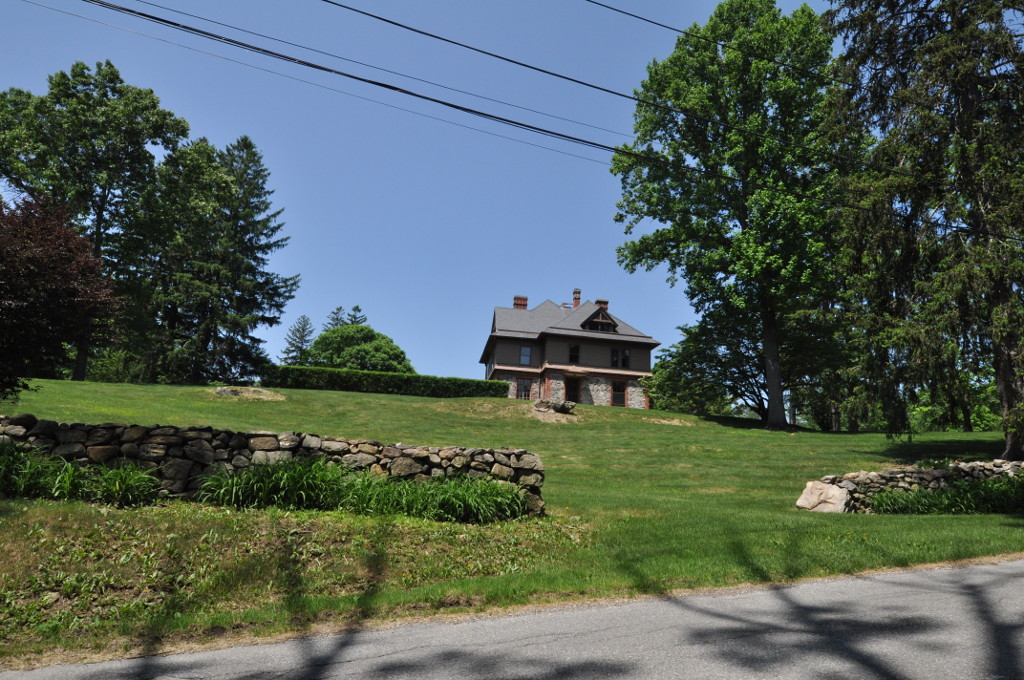

- Location within New York Location within the United States
- Location: 703 Croton Lake Rd., Bedford Corners, New York
- Coordinates: 41°13′32″N 73°43′40″W
- Area: 5.3 acres (2.1 ha)
- Built: 1879
- Architect: Eugene C. Gardner (1879); H. O. Milliken (1916)
- Architectural style: Stick/Eastlake
- NRHP reference No.: 03001520
- Added to NRHP: January 28, 2004

Stonecrest is a historic home located at Bedford Corners, Westchester County, New York. It was built in 1879 in an eclectic Stick-Eastlake style and renovated in 1916. It is a rectangular three-story dwelling, measuring 50 feet deep and 45 feet wide. The first story is built of random rubble and the second of wood shingles that flare away from the first floor. A slate covered hipped roof covers the third floor and attic. Also on the property are a contributing Stick Style carriage house, stone root cellar, and stone spring house.

The house was built for Francis Lawrence Underhill and his wife, Mary Augusta (Wood) Underhill, a member of the locally prominent Wood family who were associated with the house of The Woodpile.

It was added to the National Register of Historic Places in 2004.

== See also ==
- National Register of Historic Places listings in northern Westchester County, New York
