= Addison Hutton =

American architect

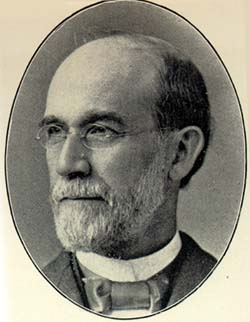
- A 1901 illustration of Hutton
- Born: November 28, 1834; Sewickley Township, Pennsylvania, U.S.
- Died: June 26, 1916 (aged 81); Jefferson County, Ohio, U.S.
- Occupation: Architect
- Buildings: Parrish Hall at Swarthmore College (Swarthmore, Pennsylvania); Arch Street Methodist Church (Philadelphia); Ridgway Library (Philadelphia); Historical Society of Pennsylvania (Philadelphia)

Addison Hutton (1834–1916) was a Philadelphia architect who designed prominent residences in Philadelphia and its suburbs, plus courthouses, hospitals, and libraries, including the Ridgway Library, now Philadelphia High School for the Creative and Performing Arts, and the Historical Society of Pennsylvania. He made major additions to the campuses of Westtown School, George School, Swarthmore College, Bryn Mawr College, Haverford College, and Lehigh University.

== Early life and education ==
Hutton was born on November 28, 1834. He grew up in Westmoreland County, Pennsylvania, southeast of Pittsburgh. He was the son of Joel Hutton, a Quaker carpenter, and Ann Mains. At an early age, he became fond of the "solid necessities of building" and enjoyed working alongside his father. Like his father, Addison would vary between carpenting and school. A young man named Robert Grimacy gave him lessons in architecture; it was then that Addison Hutton considered it to be a possible direction in his own life.

== Career ==
Hutton studied architecture with Samuel Sloan, a leading Philadelphia architect and author of books on house designs. He supervised construction of the Sloan-designed Longwood in Natchez, Mississippi (1859–62), until construction was abandoned during the American Civil War, stranding Hutton, a pacifist, in the Deep South. He became Sloan's partner in 1864 and was able to bring numerous commissions to their office due to his Quaker connections. By 1868, he had established his own office.

In November 1901, the American Institute of Architects denounced the design competition for the Pennsylvania State Capitol in Harrisburg, Pennsylvania, and urged its members not to participate. Hutton was one of nine architects who submitted designs (his was not selected), and he was expelled from the AIA in February 1902.

=== Marriage and children ===
On October 10, 1865, Addison married Rebecca W. Savery, daughter of William Savery and Elizabeth H. Cresson. They had one child, a girl named Mary, who was born September 1, 1869; Mary married James Garrett Biddle. In 1876, Hutton built a house for his family in Bryn Mawr, Pennsylvania, near those of several of his clients. It still stands at the southwest corner of Montgomery and Morris Avenues.

=== Death and afterward ===
Hutton died on June 26, 1916, and was buried at Short Creek Meeting House in Jefferson County, Ohio. His granddaughter has written a biography: Elizabeth Biddle Yarnall, Addison Hutton: Quaker Architect, 1834–1916 (Philadelphia: The Art Alliance Press, 1974).

== Architectural works (partial listing) ==
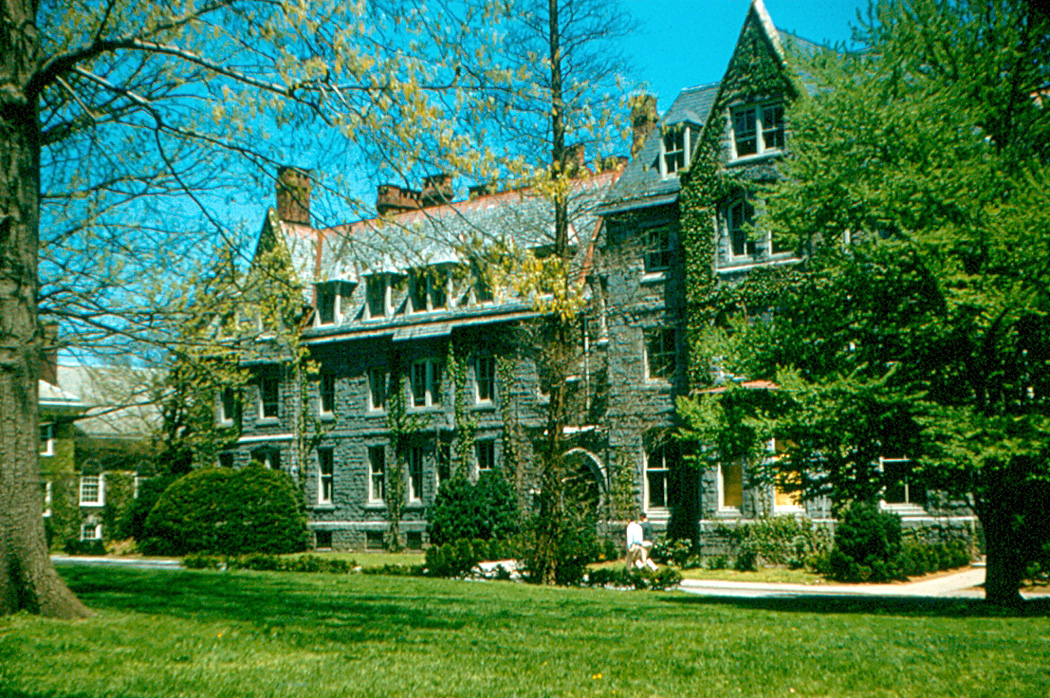
A 1958 photograph of Barclay Hall (1887) at Haverford College. Barclay Hall, named after Scottish Quaker Robert Barclay, was designed by Addison Hutton.

=== Colleges, libraries, and cultural institutions ===
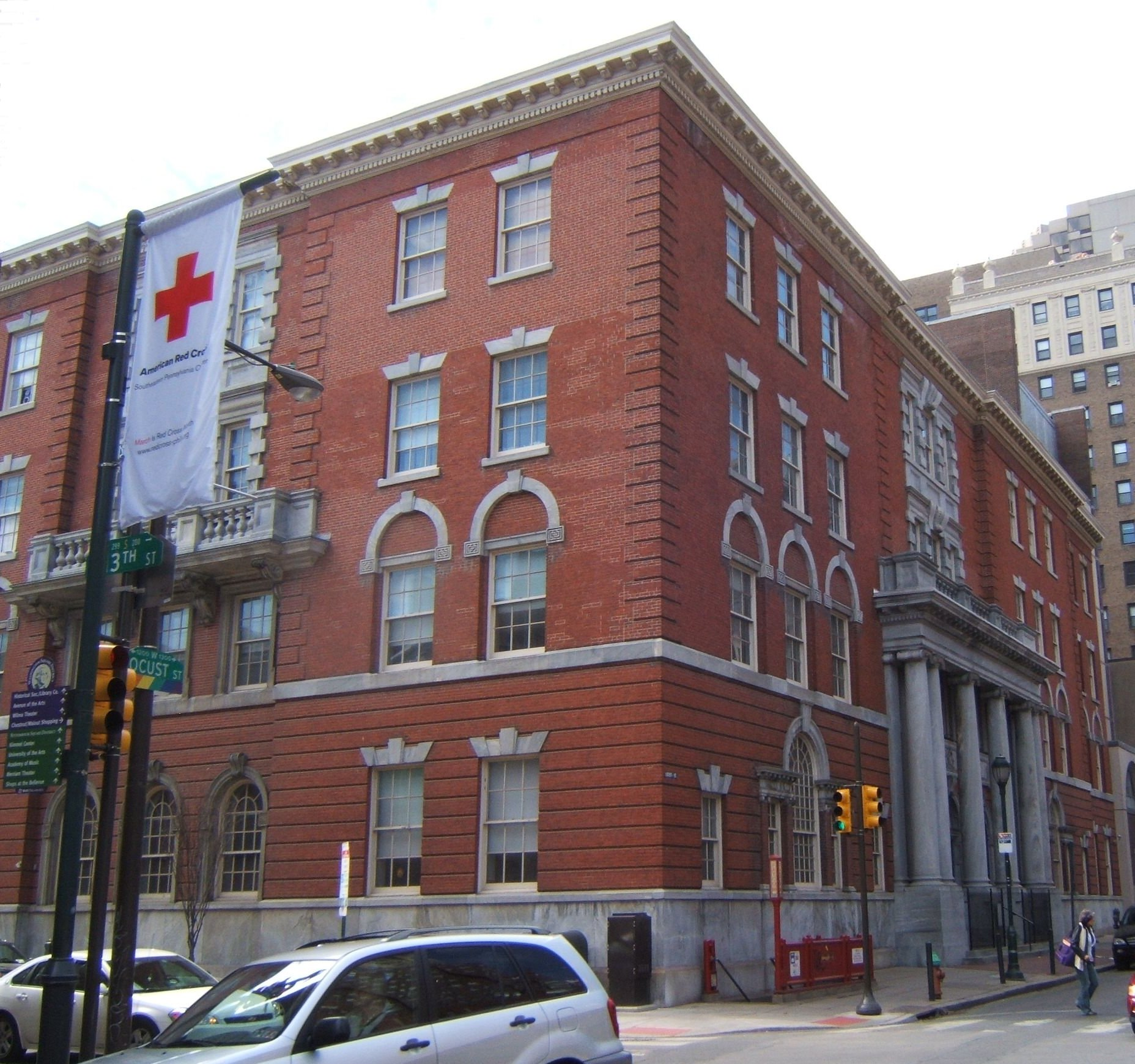
Historical Society of Pennsylvania at 13th and Locust Streets in Philadelphia in 1902

- 1869 Parrish Hall, Swarthmore College's first building, Swarthmore, Pennsylvania
- 1870–78 Ridgway Library, the Library Company of Philadelphia at Broad and Christian Sts., Philadelphia (now Philadelphia High School for the Creative and Performing Arts)
- 1874 President's House, Swarthmore College, Swarthmore, Pennsylvania
- 1874 Women's Medical College of Pennsylvania, Philadelphia
- 1876 Friends Boarding School, now Olney Friends School, Barnesville, Ohio
- 1876 Linderman Library, Lehigh University, Bethlehem, Pennsylvania
- 1877 Barclay Hall, Haverford College, Haverford, Pennsylvania
- 1878 Public Library, Johnstown, Pennsylvania (destroyed by the 1889 Johnstown Flood)
- 1879–84 Taylor Hall, Bryn Mawr College, Bryn Mawr, Pennsylvania
- 1879–84 Merion Hall, Bryn Mawr College, Bryn Mawr, Pennsylvania
- 1882 Mauch Chunk Opera House, 14 W. Broadway, Jim Thorpe, Pennsylvania
- 1882 Coppee Hall Gymnasium, Lehigh University, Bethlehem, Pennsylvania
- 1884–85 Chandler Chemistry Laboratory, Lehigh University, Bethlehem, Pennsylvania
- 1885 Packer Memorial Chapel, Lehigh University, Bethlehem, Pennsylvania
- 1885 Friends Select School, 16th and Cherry Sts., Philadelphia
- 1886 Main Building, Westtown School, West Chester, Pennsylvania
- 1889 Packer Hall Tower, Lehigh University, Bethlehem, Pennsylvania
- 1890–92 Carnegie Library, Johnstown, Pennsylvania (now Johnstown Flood Museum)
- 1891 Renovations to Musical Fund Hall, The Musical Fund Society, 806 Locust Street, Philadelphia
- 1892 George School, Newtown, Pennsylvania
- 1897–98 Vail Memorial Library, Lincoln University, Oxford, Pennsylvania
- 1902 Historical Society of Pennsylvania, 1300 Locust St., Philadelphia

=== Churches ===
- 1868 Germantown Friends Meeting House, 47 W. Coulter St., Philadelphia
- 1869–70 Arch Street United Methodist Church, SE corner Broad and Arch Sts., Philadelphia
- 1871 Doylestown Presbyterian Church, Doylestown, Pennsylvania
- 1872 Rectory for Church of the Redeemer, 220 Pennswood Road, Lower Merion Township, Pennsylvania
- 1887-1890 Sarah Packer Memorial Building, St. Mark's Episcopal Church, Jim Thorpe, Pennsylvania

=== Institutional buildings and businesses ===
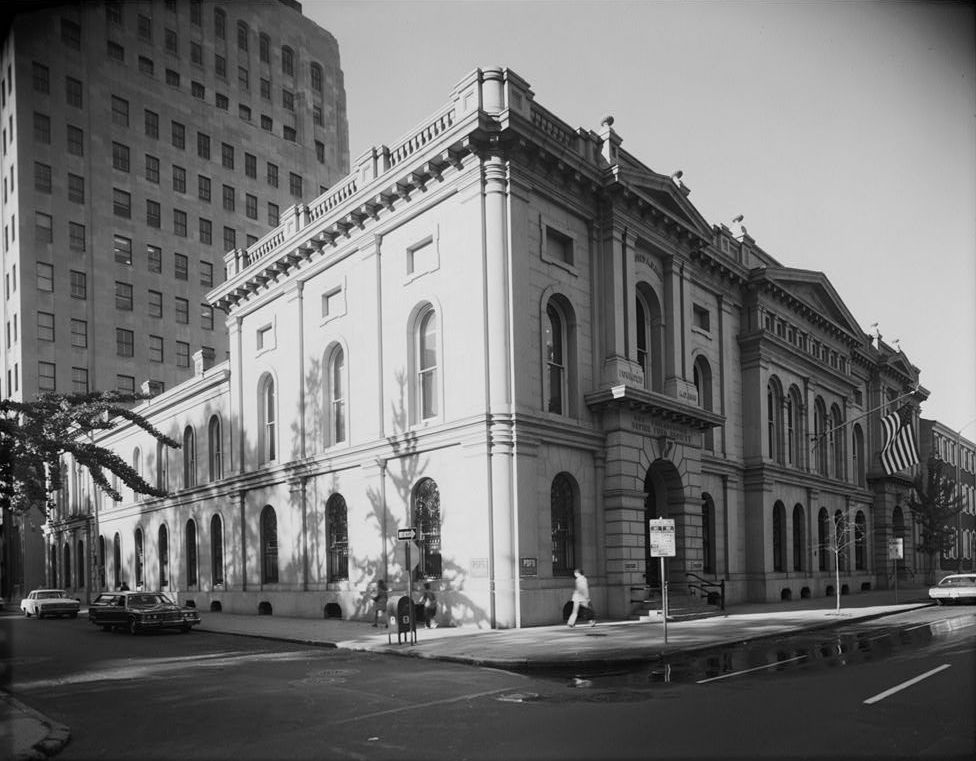
Philadelphia Savings Fund Society, 700 Walnut Street, Philadelphia (1869), addition to right (1888). Mirror-image facade addition beyond flag (1897–98) by Frank Furness

- 1867 Shew Hall, Connecticut Hospital for the Insane, Middletown, Connecticut
- 1868 Venango County Courthouse, Franklin, Pennsylvania (with Samuel Sloan)
- 1869 Clinton County Courthouse, Lock Haven, Pennsylvania (with Samuel Sloan)
- 1869 PSFS headquarters and York Row|Philadelphia Savings Fund Society Building, Walnut St. and Washington Square, Philadelphia, expanded by Hutton, 1885–86 and 1888; expanded by Frank Furness, 1897–98 In 2004 incorporated into The St. James, luxury apartments.
- 1874 Lenape Building, SE corner Main & State Sts., Doylestown, Pennsylvania
- 1876 Bucks County Intelligencer (newspaper) Building, Doylestown, Pennsylvania
- 1878 Bucks County Courthouse, Doylestown, Pennsylvania
- 1884–85 Bucks County Prison (later Pine Street Hotel), 138 S. Pine St., Doylestown, Pennsylvania (now James A. Michener Art Museum)
- 1888–89 Girard Life Insurance Building, NE corner Broad and Chestnut Sts., Philadelphia (demolished 1926)
- 1890 Pennsylvania Company for Insurance on Lives and Granting Annuities, 517 Chestnut St., Philadelphia (demolished 1950s in the creation of Independence Mall)
- 1900 Department for the Chronic Insane, first floor plan, Harrisburg State Hospital, Harrisburg, Pennsylvania
- 1901 Design competition for Pennsylvania State Capitol, Harrisburg, Pennsylvania (design not selected)
- 1904 Additions to Chalfonte-Haddon Hall Hotel, Atlantic City, New Jersey

=== Residences ===
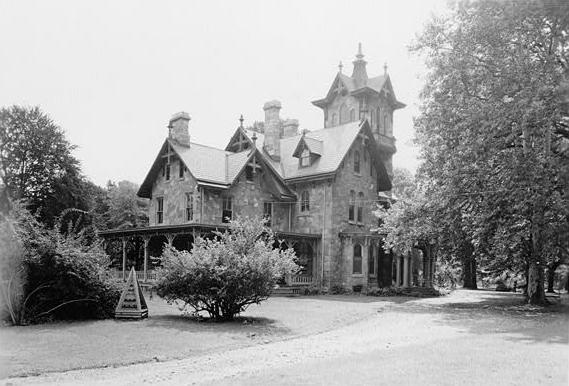
"Glenloch" (William E. Lockwood mansion), Frazer, PA (1865–68). Perched on a hill above the intersection of Routes 30 and 202, Glenloch was once an estate of 684 acres (277 ha).

- 1862 Henry G. Morris cottage, Newport, Rhode Island
- 1865-68 "Glenloch" (later called "Lock Aerie"), residence of William E. Lockwood, Lancaster Pike, Frazer, Pennsylvania
- 1866-1867 Barclay House, West Chester, Pennsylvania
- 1869 "The Chestnuts", residence of David Scull, 5820 City Ave., Overbrook, Pennsylvania (now home of the Sisters of the Visitation)
- 1869 "Elm Villa", residence of D. T. Gage, Maple St., Merchantville, New Jersey
- 1870 "Pembrook Farm", residence of Charles H. Wheeler, 310 Fishers Rd, Bryn Mawr, Pennsylvania
- 1870 "St. Michel", residence of Francis A. Drexel, Knights Rd., Torresdale, Pennsylvania
- 1870 "The Four Sisters" Residences: 101, 121, 205 & 221 W. Virginia Ave., West Chester, Pennsylvania
- 1870 "Braewold", Bedford, New York, listed on the National Register of Historic Places as part of The Woodpile historic district in 1992
- 1872 "Cedarcroft", residence of Robert Emmet Monaghan, 413 W. Miner St., West Chester, Pennsylvania
- 1874 Harry Packer Mansion, Jim Thorpe, Pennsylvania (now a bed & breakfast)
- 1875 "Midhope", residence of Prof. James C. Booth, Booth Lane, Haverford Station, Pennsylvania
- 1876 Addison Hutton's residence, 802 Montgomery Ave., Bryn Mawr, Pennsylvania
- 1877 "Sylvula", residence of Stephen O. Fuguet, 931 Montgomery Ave., Bryn Mawr, Pennsylvania (renamed "Beechwood" by 1908, now part of The Shipley School)
- 1877-1878 Charles Thomas House, West Whiteland Township, Pennsylvania
- 1880 Residence, 3400 Powelton Ave., Philadelphia
- 1880 Residence for G. M. Rupert, 506 N Church Street, West Chester, Pennsylvania
- 1880s "Penn Grove", residence of N. Parker Shortridge, Lancaster Ave. & Wynnewood Rd., Wynnewood, Pennsylvania
- 1880-81 Residence of J. W. Townsend, 825 Montgomery Ave., Bryn Mawr, PA
- 1881 "Waverly Heights", residence of Samuel Rea, 1400 Waverly Rd., Gladwyne, Pennsylvania (now Wavery Heights Retirement Community)
- 1881 "Greenway", residence of George Lovell, 235 Pennswood Rd., Bryn Mawr, Pennsylvania
- 1882 "Egerton House", residence of Mrs. Edward Scull, 5760 City Ave., Overbrook, Pennsylvania (now residence of the Archbishop of Philadelphia)
- 1882 James Spear Residence, 244-46 S. 21st St., Philadelphia
- 1884 "Holmhurst", residence of Charles Hartshorne, Hazelhurst Ave., Merion, Pennsylvania
- 1884 216 N 34th Street, Philadelphia. Home of George Fletcher. (current home of Theta Chi fraternity at Drexel University, Philadelphia
- 1885 "Ballytore", residence of Isaac H. Clothier, 630 Clothier Rd., Wynnewood, Pennsylvania (now St. Sahag-St. Mesrob Armenian Church)
- 1885 "Torworth", residence of J. C. Strawbridge, School House Ln., Germantown section of Philadelphia (demolished)
- c.1885-89 "Roslyn Heights", residence of Stevenson Crothers, Papermill Rd., Erdenheim, Pennsylvania
- 1887 Residence of Edward B. Fox, 642 Montgomery Ave., Bryn Mawr, Pennsylvania (now on Harcum College's campus)
- 1890 "Dundale", residence of Theodore Morris, Spring Mill Rd., Villanova, Pennsylvania (now Picotte Hall at Villanova University)
- 1890 "Hillhurst", residence of John Biddle, 216 S. Orange St., Media, Pennsylvania
- 1908 Alterations to 44 S Wyoming Ave., Lower Merion Township, Pennsylvania

== Gallery ==
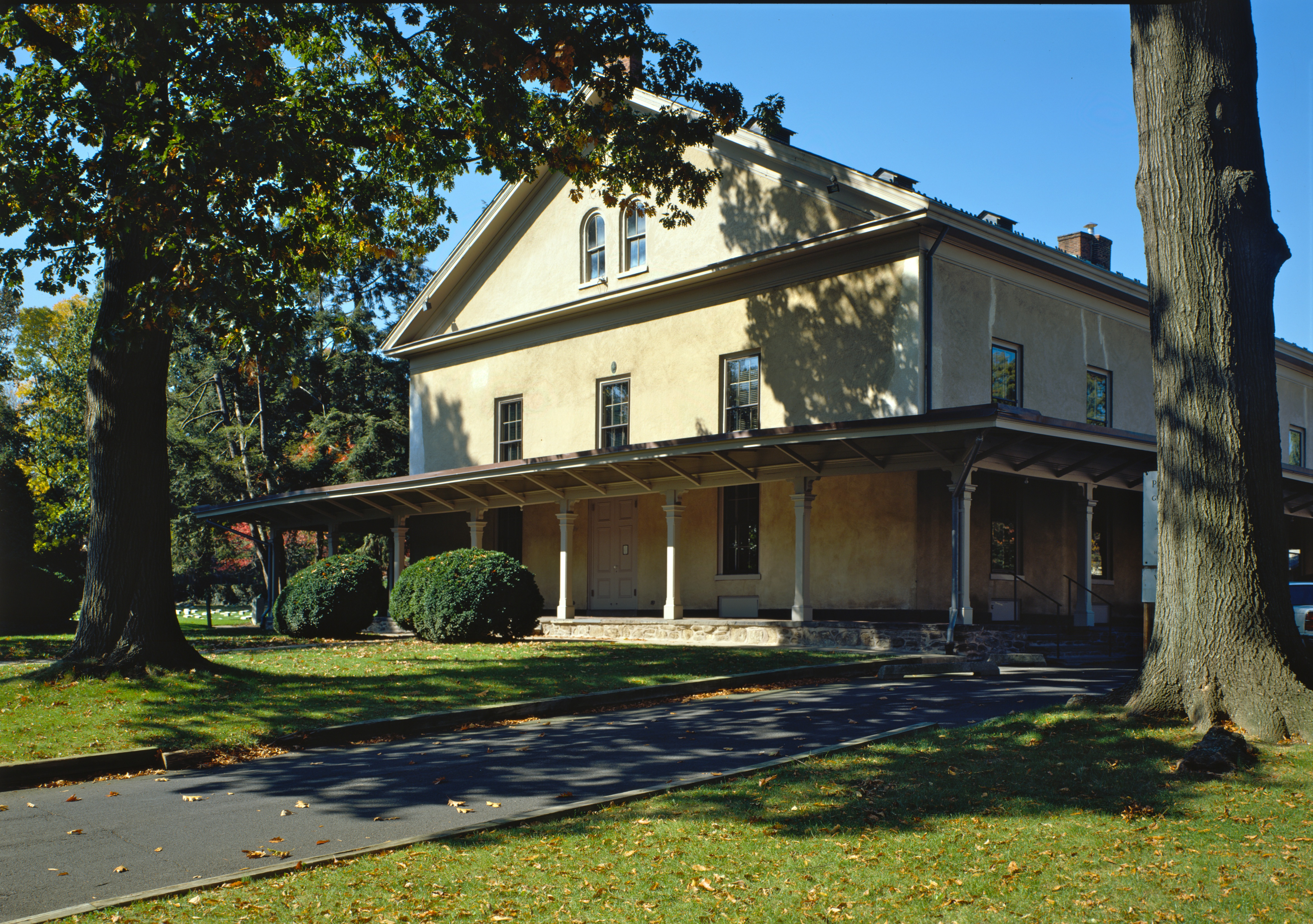
Germantown Friends Meeting House, Philadelphia (1868).

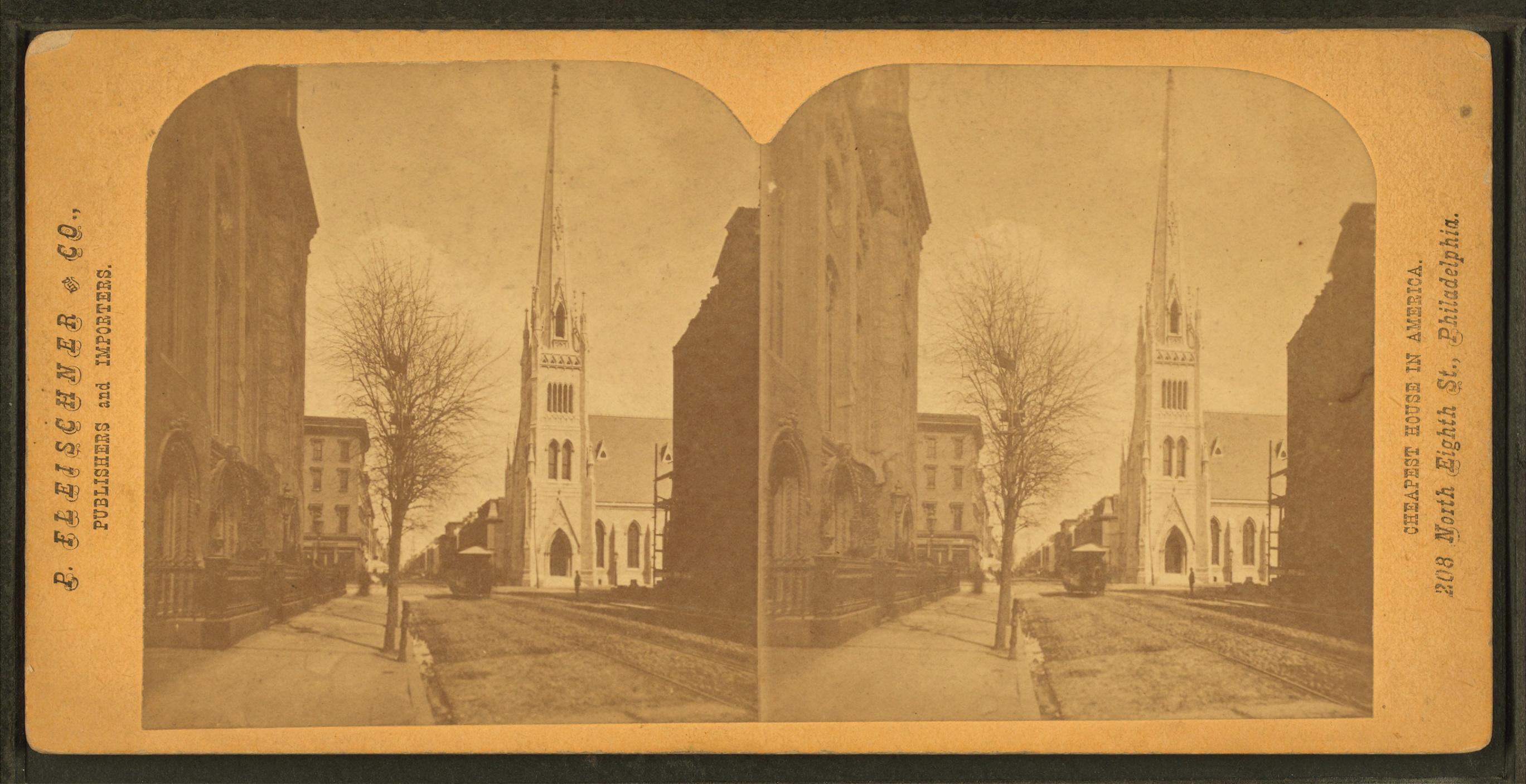
Arch Street United Methodist Church, SE corner Broad and Arch Sts., Philadelphia (1869–70).

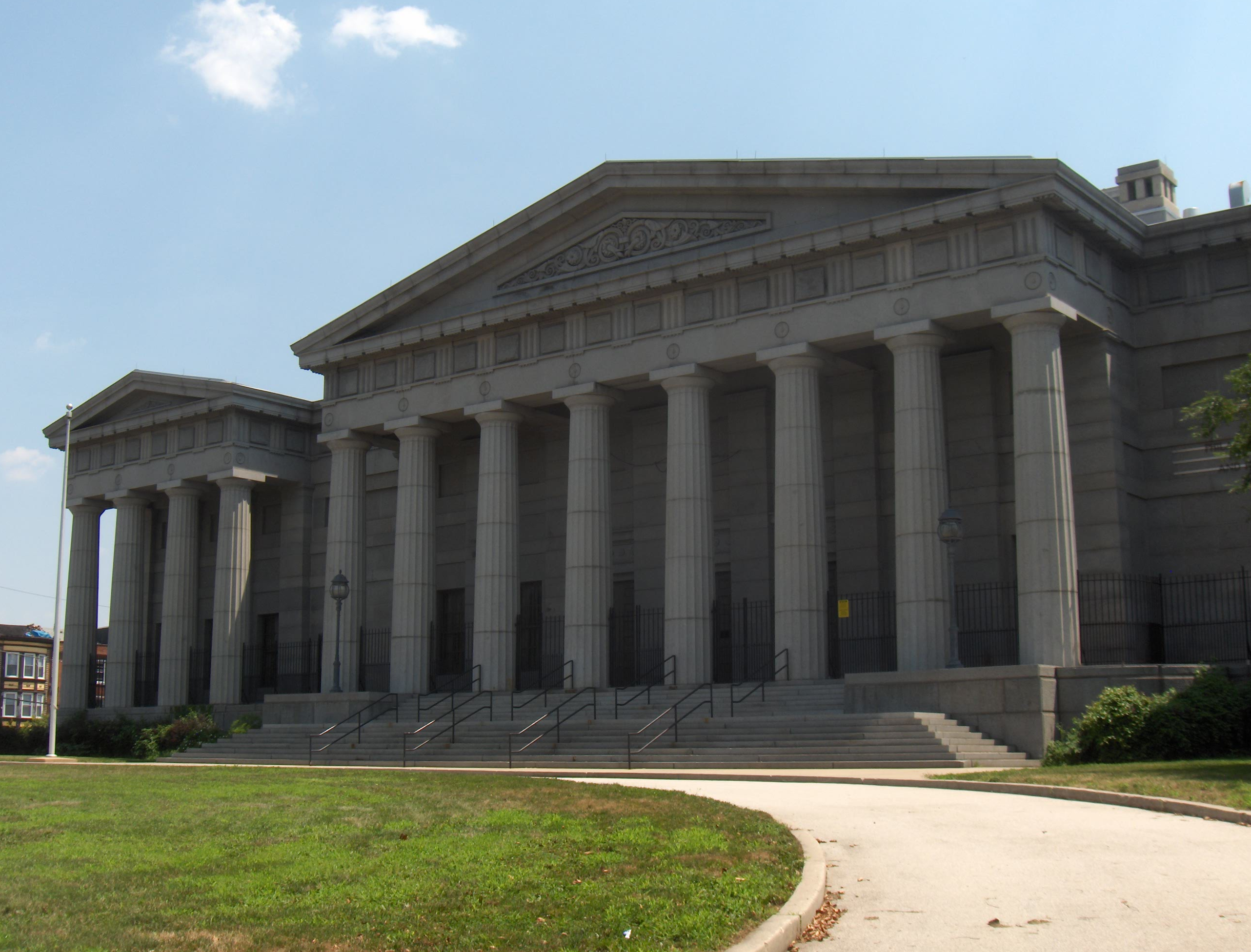
Ridgway Library, Philadelphia (1870–78). (now Philadelphia High School for the Creative and Performing Arts

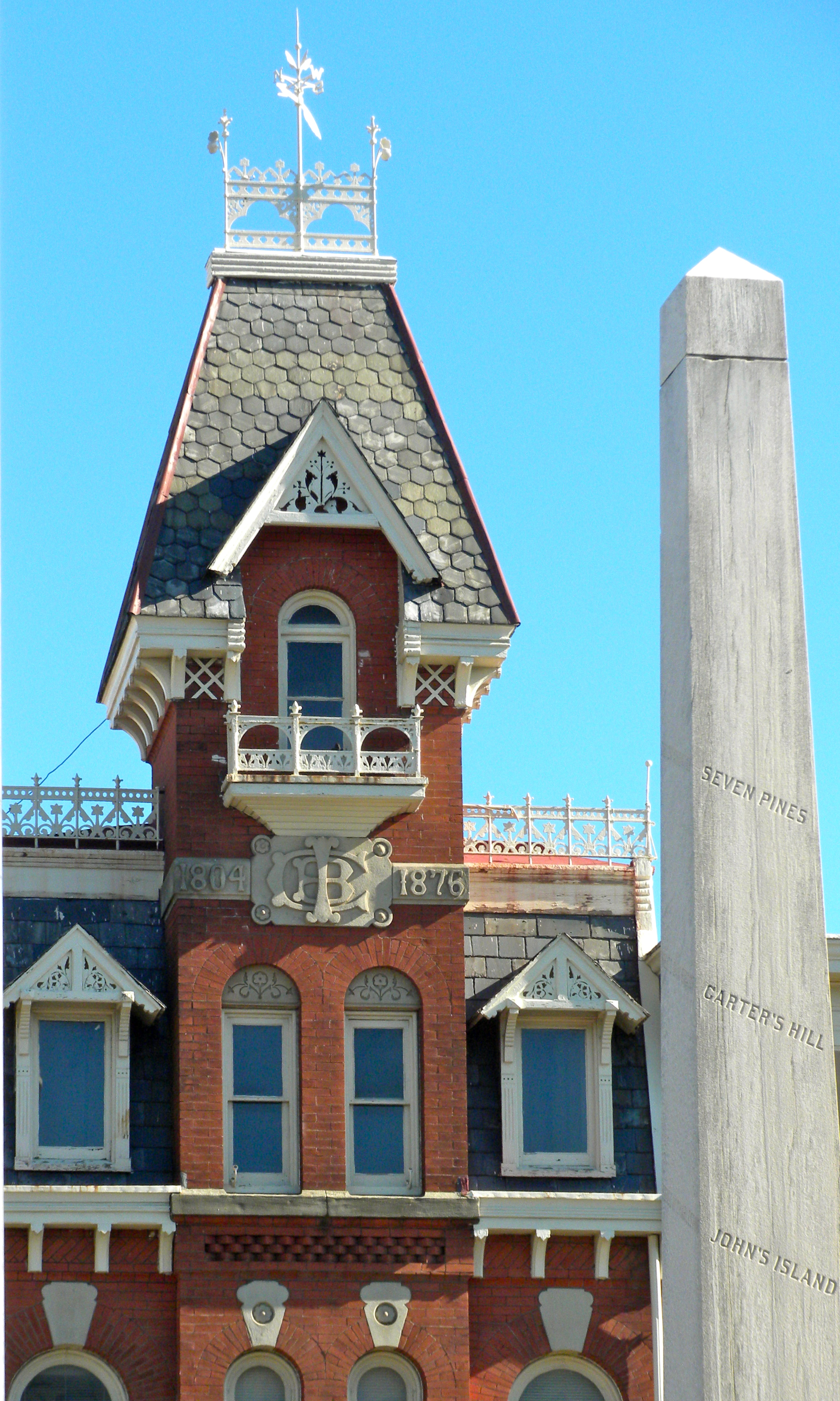
Bucks County Intelligencer Building, Doylestown, Pennsylvania (1876)

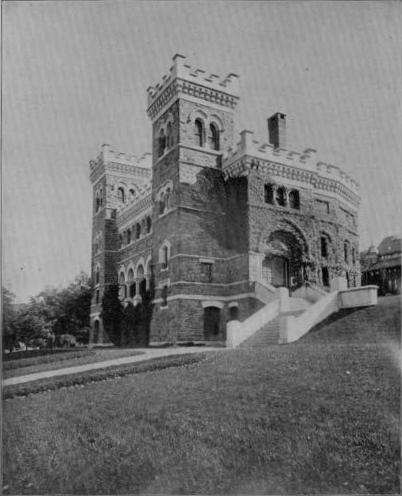
Linderman Library, Lehigh University, Bethlehem, Pennsylvania (1876)

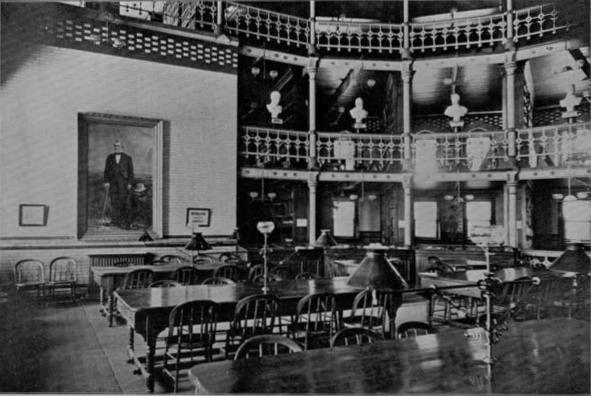
Linderman Library, interior (1876)

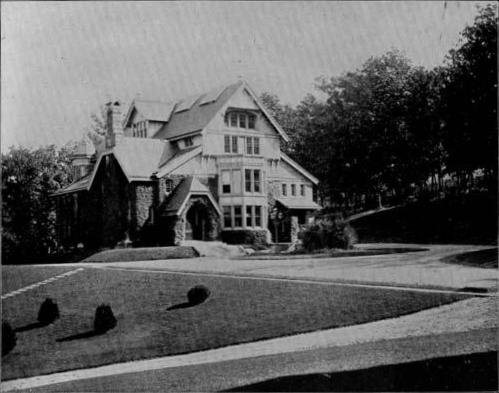
Coppee Hall Gymnasium, Lehigh University, Bethlehem, Pennsylvania (1882)

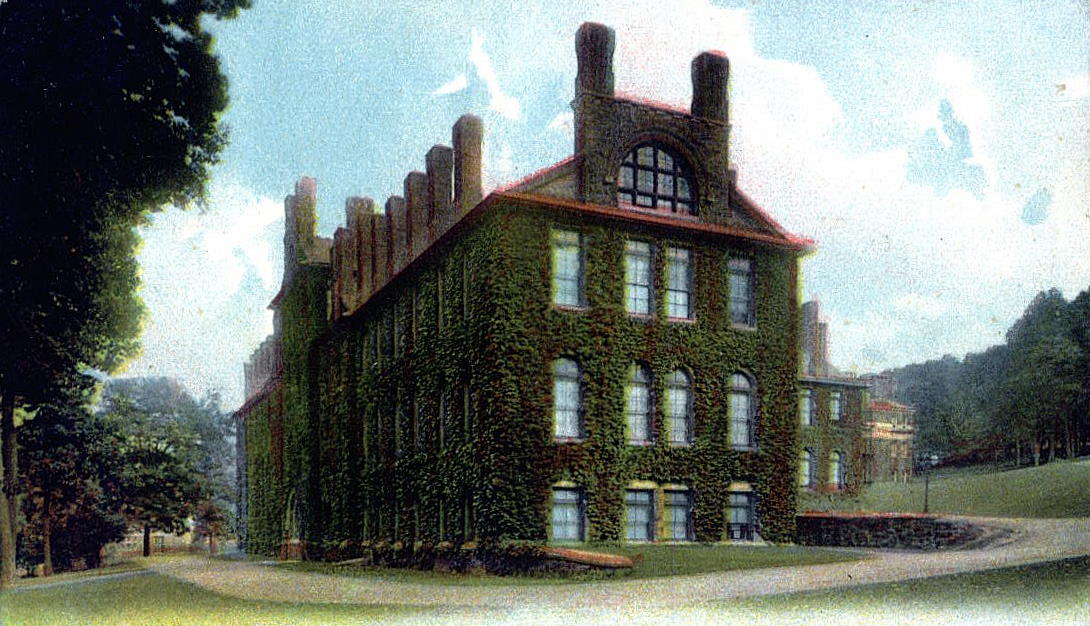
Chandler Chemistry Laboratory, Lehigh University, Bethlehem, Pennsylvania (1884–85)

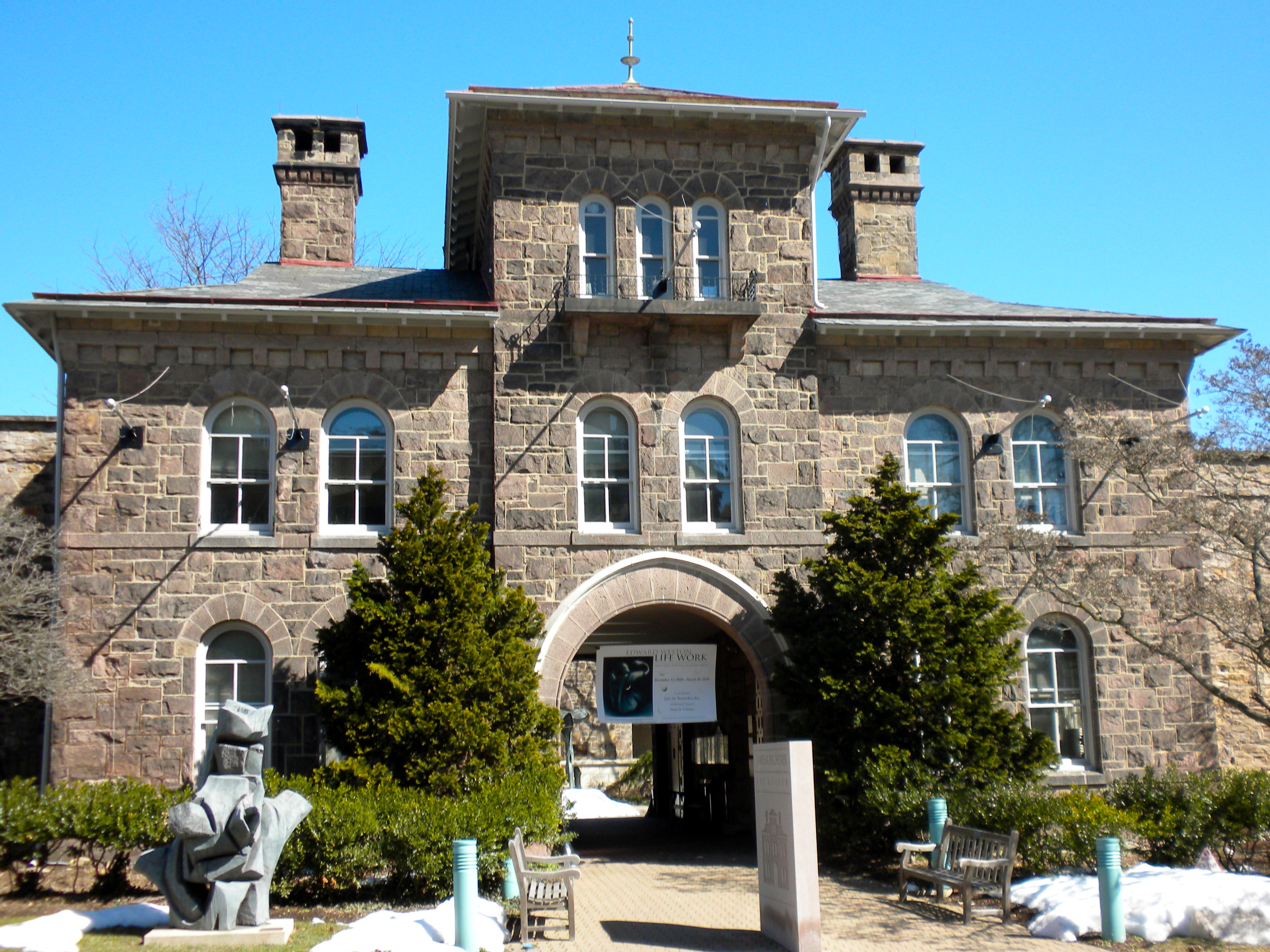
Bucks County Prison, Doylestown, Pennsylvania (1884–85). (now James A. Michener Art Museum)

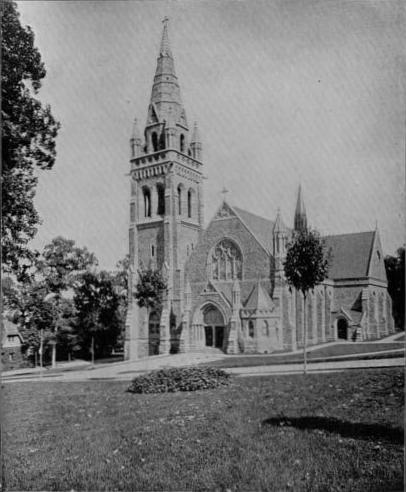
Packer Memorial Chapel, Lehigh University, Bethlehem, Pennsylvania (1885)

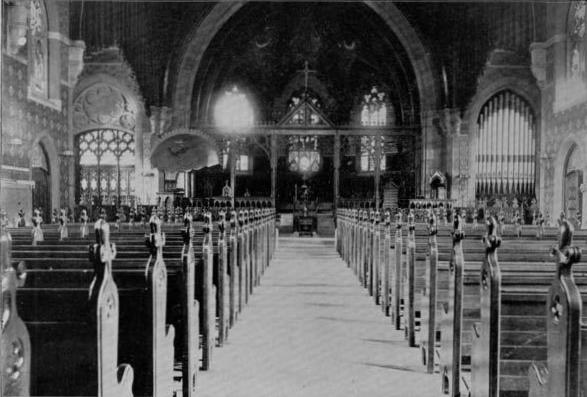
Packer Memorial Chapel, interior (1885)

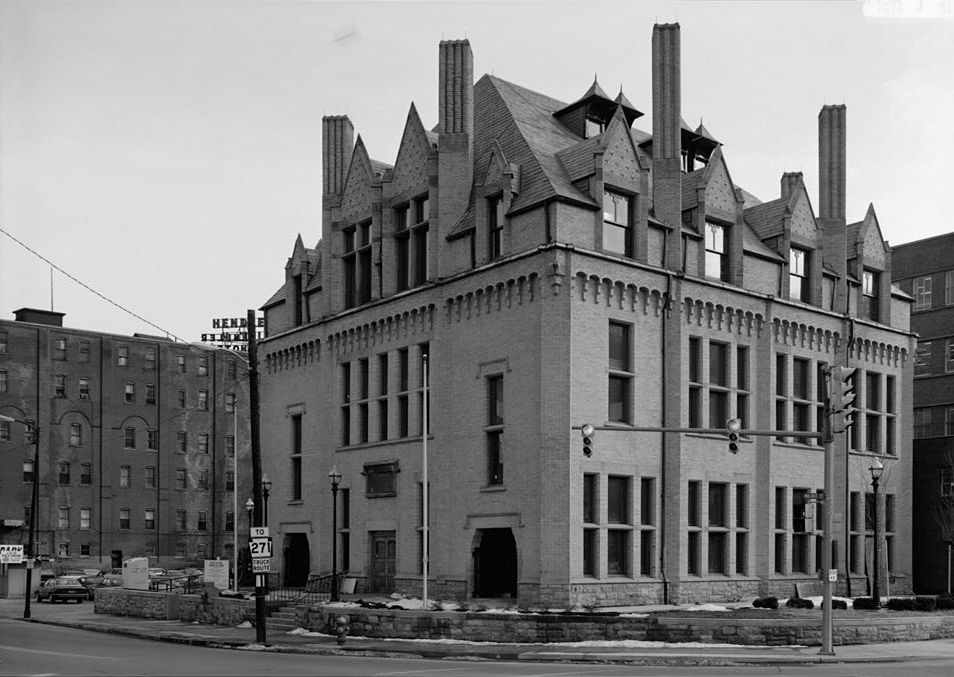
Carnegie Library, Johnstown, Pennsylvania (1890–92). Hutton's 1878 library was destroyed by the 1889 Johnstown Flood. This replacement library, built on the same site, is now the Johnstown Flood Museum
