= Bedford Presbyterian Church (New York) =

- U.S. National Register of Historic Places
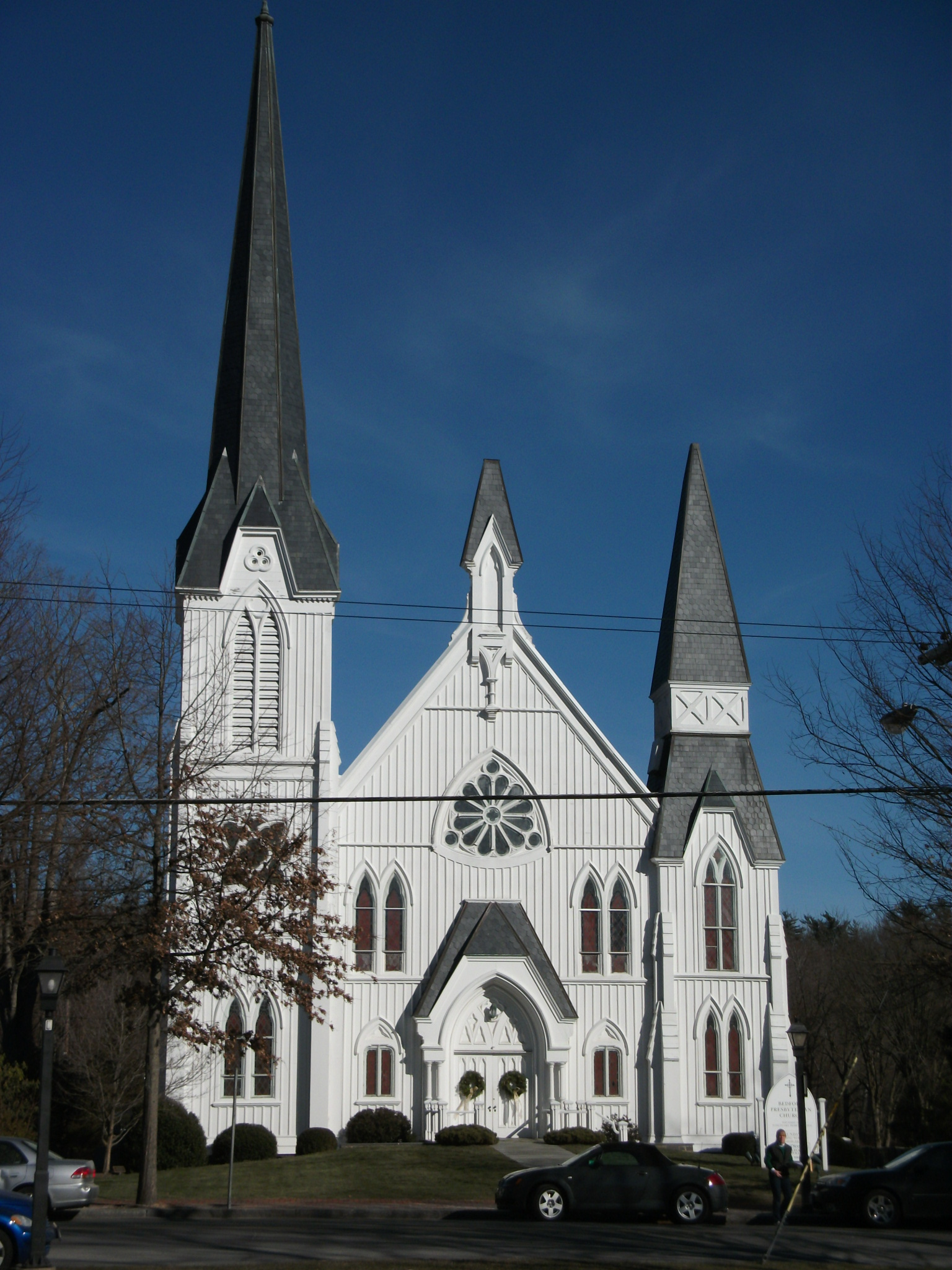
- From the village green in 2010
- Location: Bedford, New York
- Coordinates: 41.2032°N 73.6425°W
- Built: 1872
- Architectural style: Gothic Revival
- NRHP reference No.: 73001285
- Added to NRHP: October 2, 1973

The Bedford Presbyterian Church is a parish church in Bedford, Westchester County, New York. The current structure was built in 1872 in the Gothic Revival style. It is the fourth building for the congregation on the site. The building is part of the Bedford Village Historic District, and was listed on the National Register of Historic Places in 1973. It also serves as a venue for performances of sacred music.

== History ==
Bedford Presbyterian Church was founded in 1680. In its first years, the church was either Congregational or Anglican, depending on the minister. The church is the fourth building on the site on the village green in Bedford. The cornerstone was laid and services celebrating the dedication of the then-most-recently-restored building were held in 1872.

The first minister, Reverend Thomas Denham, settled in 1684, and a meeting house was built in 1689. When Bedford became part of New York in 1700, this house was transferred to Rye, New York. Bedford was part of the Anglican Church until the Revolution. A second meeting house was burned by order of a British colonel in 1779. A third house was transferred to Westmoreland Sanctuary. The fourth building, the present church, was built in 1872, with a Sunday school in the rear. It was described as

an 1872 newcomer, a whitewashed eccentricity with unmatching towers, an unexpected rose window and, within, amen pews flanking the pulpit.

It is part of the Bedford Village Historic District, which was added to the National Register of Historic Places in northern Westchester County in 1973.

The church, which has excellent acoustics, is often used as a venue for sacred music concerts and recitals. The choir The Master Singers of Westchester performed regular concerts such as Britten's A Ceremony of Carols in 1984, his cantata St. Nicholas in 1986, and Bach's Mass in B minor in March 2003. The Westchester Oratorio Society performed its 20th-anniversary concert there on 6 May 2018, performing Mozart's Requiem, with organist Anthony Newman.

In 1998, the congregation contracted with Martin Pasi to design and build a new tracker organ for the church. The organ is a 2-manual organ of 29 stops and is entirely encased in the rear gallery.

Bedford Presbyterian is known for its creative worship, outreach ministries, and youth programs. The high school youth program is centered around work trips to Appalachia and Nicaragua. The members of the congregation work with Habitat for Humanity, the Mount Kisco Interfaith Food Pantry, and Midnight Run. Bedford Presbyterian Church helped to co-found the Emergency Shelter Partnership in which local churches and synagogues provide shelter for homeless guests during the winter months.

Their present minister is the Rev. Dr. Joseph F. Scrivner.

== Pastors ==
- Thomas Denham, 1684-
- Rev. Dr. Paul Alcorn, 1989 - 2018
- Carol Howard Merritt, 2020-
- Joseph F. Scrivner, Jr., 2026-

== Sources ==
- Reverend Heroy: A Brief History of the Presbyterian Church at Bedford, N.Y. from the Year 1680. 1874.
