= Barclay House (West Chester, Pennsylvania) =

Historic house in Pennsylvania, United States

- U.S. National Register of Historic Places
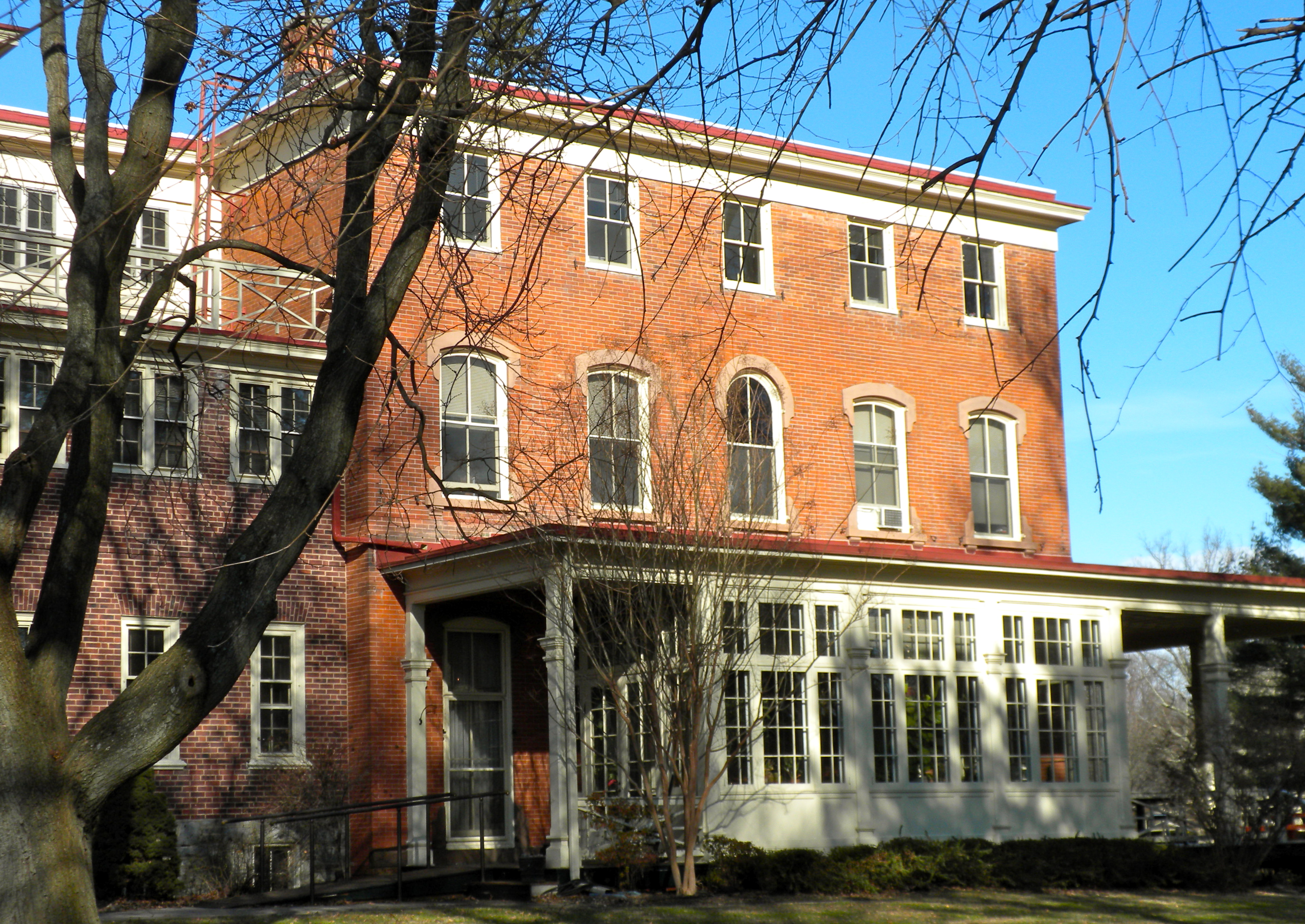
- Barclay House, January 2010

- Location within Pennsylvania Location within the United States
- Location: 535 and 539 N. Church St., West Chester, Pennsylvania
- Coordinates: 39°58′1″N 75°36′34″W
- Area: 4.5 acres (1.8 ha)
- Built: 1866-1867, 1869, 1935-1936
- Architect: Hutton, Addison; et al.
- Architectural style: Colonial Revival, Italianate
- NRHP reference No.: 02000380
- Added to NRHP: April 18, 2002

Barclay House, also known as the Joshua Hartshorne Estate, North Hill, and The Barclay, is a historic home located in West Chester, Chester County, Pennsylvania. The original section was built in 1866–67, and believed to have been designed by architect Addison Hutton (1834–1916). It was a 2 1/2-story, brick dwelling in the Italianate style. It was expanded to three stories with the expansion of 1935–36. Also added at that time was a three-story connecting block, three-story west block, and one-story north block. The house was also renovated in the Colonial Revival style. The north block was expanded to two stories in 1998. Also on the property is a contributing carriage house built in 1869. It was converted to a residence in 1925. It was built as a single family residence, but converted to a Quaker boarding home for the elderly in 1935–1936. The boarding home closed at this location in 1997.

It was listed on the National Register of Historic Places in 2002.
