= Charles Thomas House =

Historic house in Pennsylvania, United States

- U.S. National Register of Historic Places
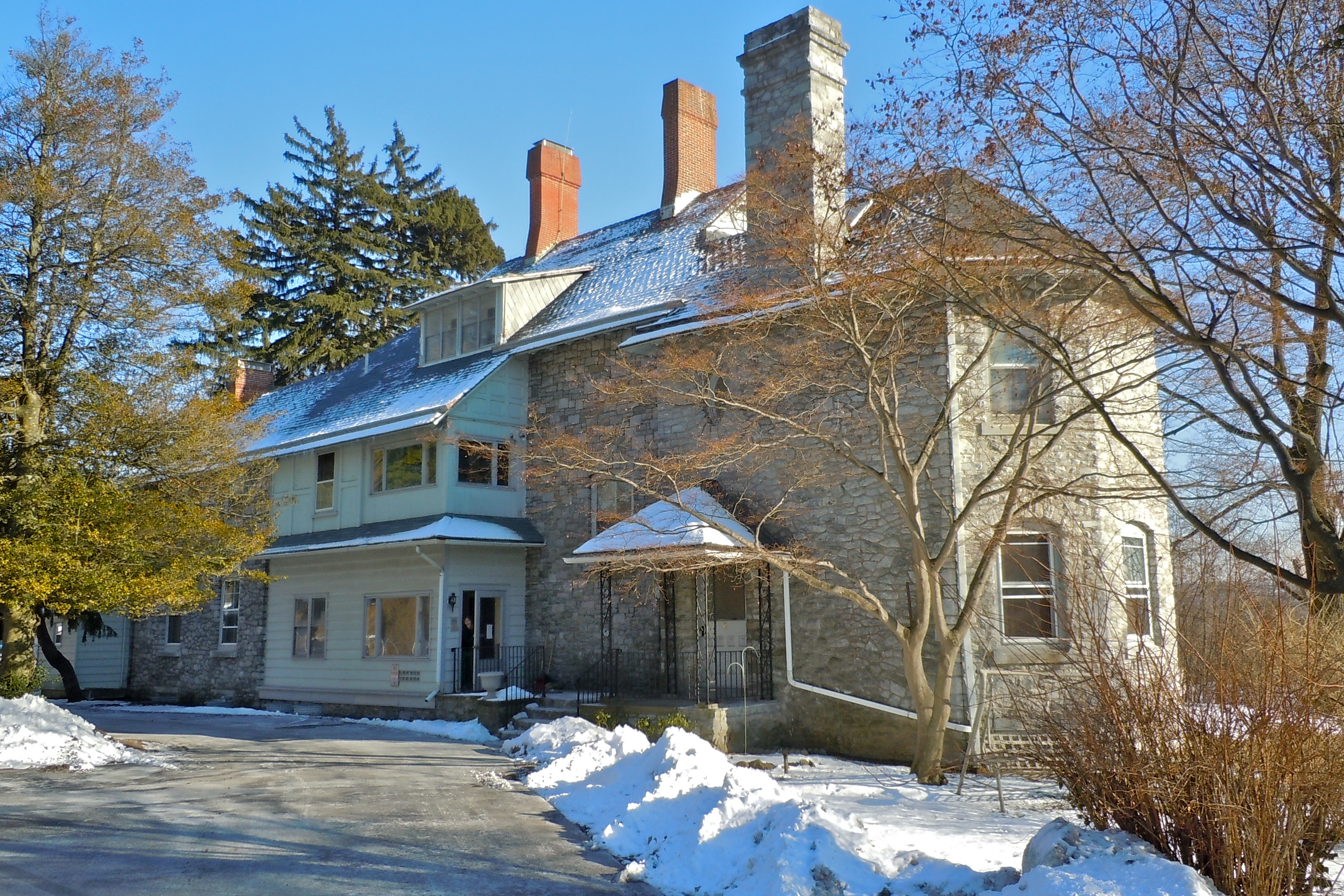
- Charles Thomas House, January 2011

- Location within Pennsylvania Location within the United States
- Location: 225 N. Whitford Rd., West Whiteland Township, Pennsylvania
- Coordinates: 40°1′51″N 75°38′56″W
- Area: 6.4 acres (2.6 ha)
- Built: 1877-1878, 1896
- Architect: Hutton, Addison; Dilks, Albert
- Architectural style: Gothic
- MPS: West Whiteland Township MRA
- NRHP reference No.: 84003305
- Added to NRHP: September 6, 1984

Charles Thomas House, also known as Fairview, is a historic home located in West Whiteland Township, Chester County, Pennsylvania. The house was designed by noted Philadelphia architect Addison Hutton (1834–1916) and built in 1877–1878. The original house was a two-story, five bay rectangular brick dwelling faced with blue limestone in a Late Gothic Revival style. It has a service wing and the pentagonal library wing was added in 1896.

It was listed on the National Register of Historic Places in 1984.
