= Palmer–Lewis Estate =

- U.S. National Register of Historic Places
- U.S. Historic district
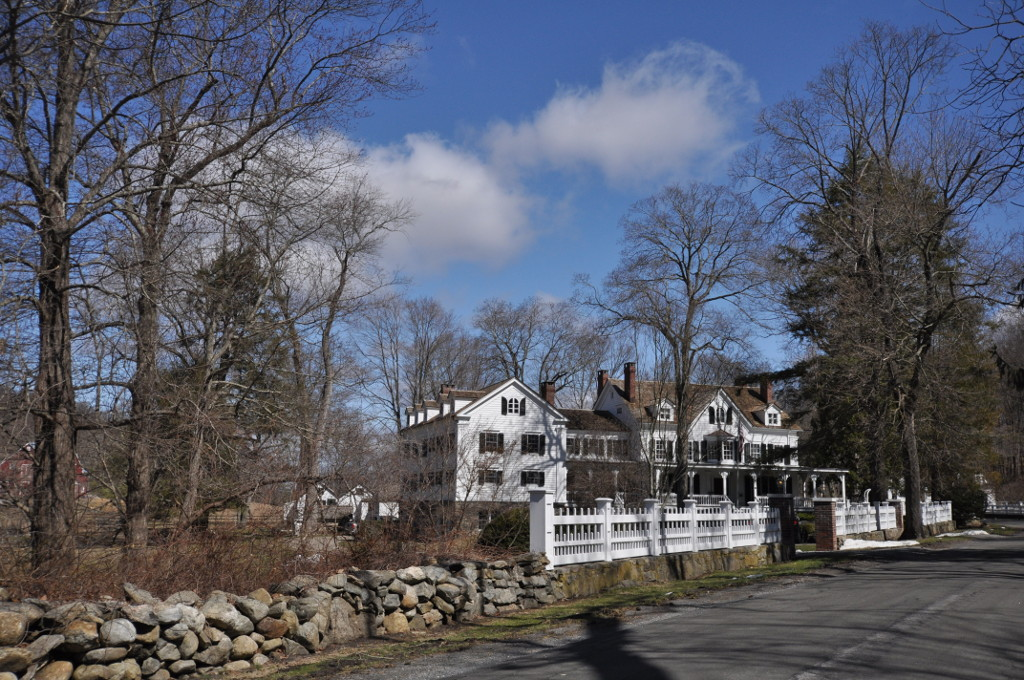

- Location within New York Location within the United States
- Nearest city: Bedford, New York
- Coordinates: 41°13′50″N 73°37′6″W
- Area: 31 acres (13 ha)
- Built: 1858
- Architectural style: Italianate
- NRHP reference No.: 98001008
- Added to NRHP: August 6, 1998

Palmer–Lewis Estate is a historic estate and national historic district located at Bedford, Westchester County, New York. The district contains 12 contributing buildings, one contributing site, and four contributing structures. It includes the main house, 15 farm-related outbuildings, and landscape features such as stone walls, walled fields, the remains of an orchard and vegetable garden, a barnyard complex, and the ruins of a dairy barn. The main house is a late 18th-century residence redesigned about 1860 in the Italianate style.

It was added to the National Register of Historic Places in 1998.

== See also ==
- National Register of Historic Places listings in northern Westchester County, New York
