= Bedford Corners, New York =

- Hamlet
- Location of Bedford Corners in New York
- Coordinates: 41°11′51″N 73°43′11″W
- Country: United States
- State: New York
- County: Westchester
- Town: Bedford
- Time zone: UTC-5 (Eastern (EST))
  - Summer (DST): UTC-4 (EDT)
- ZIP code: 10549
- Area code: 914
- FIPS code: 36-36119
- Historic names: Sutton Corners; Bedford Four Corners; Succabone Corners

Bedford Corners is a hamlet in the Westchester County town of Bedford, New York, United States, northeast of the town of Mount Kisco, with which it shares a post-office and zip code. The area is very hilly with rocky terrain and substantial native hardwood deciduous trees.

== Community ==
The area is nearly 100% residential homes with a concentration of commercial activity along South Bedford Road (State Route 117) along the Mt. Kisco border and North Bedford Road. The area is served by three commuter rail Metro North train stations—Bedford Hills, Katonah and Mount Kisco—with regular service on the Metro-North Harlem Line to New York's Grand Central Terminal approximately 40 mi (64 km) south. Bedford Corners is 12 mi (19 km) from the Westchester County Airport also known as "White Plains Airport" designated airport code "HPN". The city of White Plains lies 16 mi (26 km) south of Bedford Corners.

Stonecrest, a historic Stick-Eastlake style home, was added to the National Register of Historic Places in 2004.
