= Bedford Village Historic District =

Historic district in New York, United States

- U.S. National Register of Historic Places
- U.S. Historic district
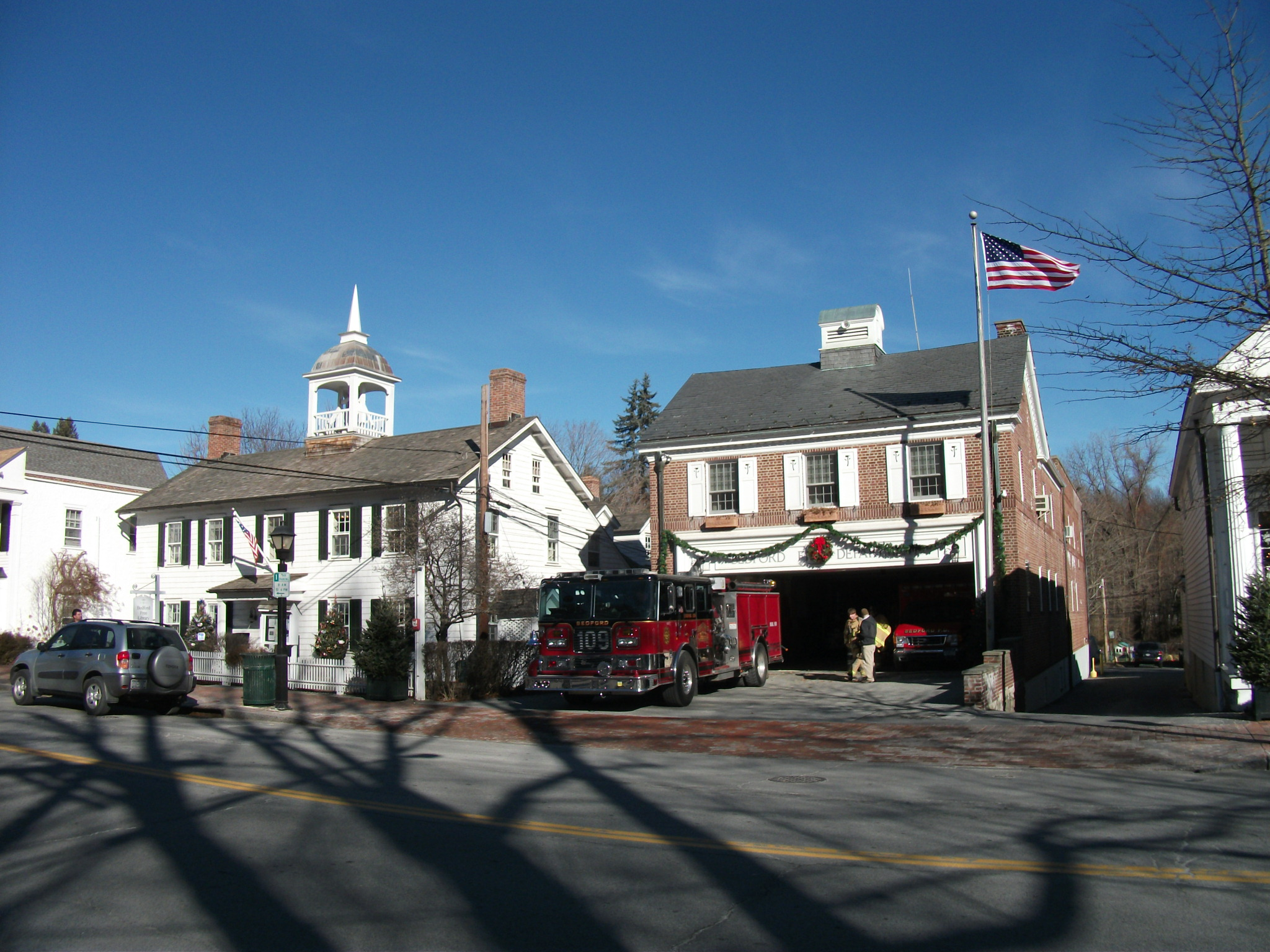
- Bedford Firehouse and Bedford Free Library

- Location within New York Location within the United States
- Location: Roughly bounded by Court, Seminary, Poundridge and Greenwich Rds., Bedford, New York
- Coordinates: 41°12′15″N 73°38′23″W
- Area: 89 acres (36 ha)
- Built: 1787
- Architectural style: Greek Revival, Gothic Revival
- NRHP reference No.: 73001285
- Added to NRHP: October 2, 1973

The Bedford Village Historic District is a national historic district in Bedford, Westchester County, New York. The district contains 80 contributing buildings and one contributing site. It encompasses most of the original 1680 hamlet and is laid out in a typical village green plan. Notable buildings include the court house (1787), library (1807), school house (1829), post office (c. 1838), and Presbyterian Church (1872). The buildings are good examples of the Greek Revival and Gothic Revival styles. Two of the buildings are now museums.

Between 1788 and 1870, Bedford served as one of the two seats of Westchester County government, alternating sessions with White Plains. This political status drove the development of its historic core. It was the largest community in northern Westchester for much of its first 200 years. This status attracted wealth, leading to the construction of the stately homes that still line the village green. Because Bedford was bypassed by the railroad that thrust its way through central Westchester in the 1840s, it avoided the rapid industrialization and 19th-century "modernization" that destroyed historic buildings in many other Westchester localities.

== History ==
Bedford is 44 miles (71 km) northeast of New York City. It is on hilly terrain with light soil. The settlers in Bedford came from Connecticut around 1680 and built a hamlet. The pattern of the settlement is common in Massachusetts but rare in New York State. The town was planned around a triangular common, or village green, where three roads met. Around it were at first three plots, which were assigned by lot to the first 20 settlers who planned to farm in common. The concept worked only for a short time but left its mark on the structure of Bedford, which became a market town. It was at times the seat of the county government during the Revolutionary War and one of two county seats, with a county court house, until 1870.

During the Revolutionary War, it served as a center of resistance, a supply center, and the home of a county government house. On July 11, 1779, British troops burned Bedford, sparing only one house which belonged to a Loyalist. After the war, buildings in Federal style, Greek Revival style, Gothic Revival style, and Victorian style were erected in Bedford.

The common village green is surrounded by the court house from 1787; the Historical Hall from 1806; a library, which was previously the Bedford Academy (an elite classical school), from 1807; a school house built from cut stone in 1829; a post office and a general store from around 1838; and the Presbyterian church from 1872. The buildings represent a New England village in a New York county. The hamlet was under a Connecticut Colony license until 1700, when it was assigned to the Province of New York on an order by King William III.

A Brief History of the Presbyterian Church at Bedford, N.Y. from the Year 1680 was written by Reverend P. B. Heroy (Peter Badeau Heroy) and published in 1874. It describes the history of the building, including the laying of the cornerstone and the services celebrating the dedication of the then most recently restored building in 1872.

The Westchester County Historical Society notes that the Bedford Village Historic District is of both historical and architectural importance as an unusual example of a "colonial New England pattern of home plots and jointly owned farm land" in New York State. The district was added to the National Register of Historic Places in northern Westchester County in 1973. The Bedford Historical Society runs two museums, one in the former court house and another in the former school house.

== Buildings ==
=== 1787 Bedford Court House ===
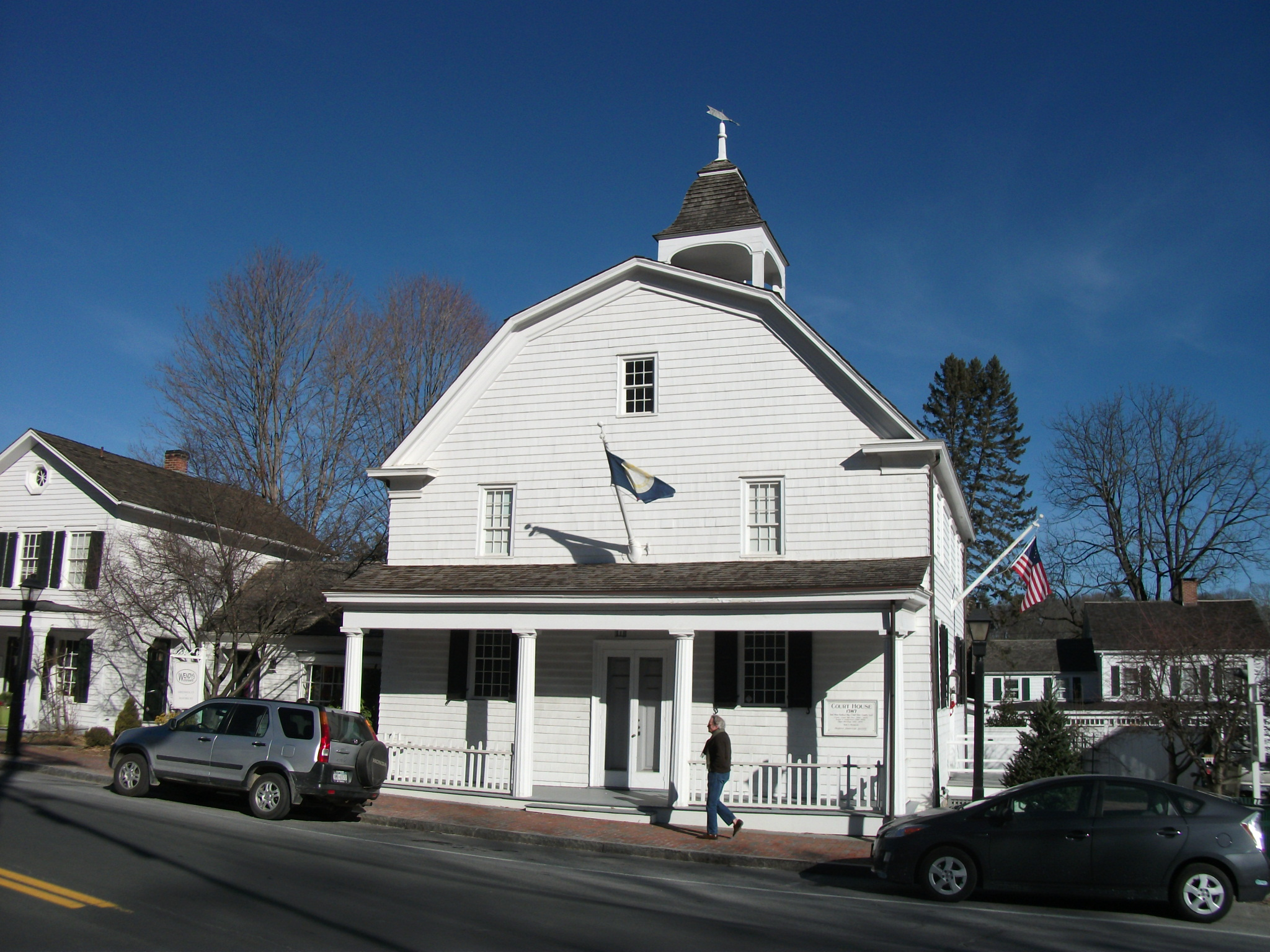
Court House

The court house was built in 1787. It is the oldest government building of Westchester County and one of three court houses in New York State from before 1800. It was erected for Bedford as the county seat from 1788 to 1870. In the court room were judges such as William Jay, son of John Jay, the first Chief Justice of the United States, and attorneys such as Aaron Burr, who later was vice president under Thomas Jefferson.

The court house was restored in 1889 and once again from 1965 to 1970. It houses the museum for the Historic District. In a tradition dating back to its first use, it is also a venue for lectures and meetings; mock trials have also been performed in the courtroom.

=== 1806 Bedford Historical Hall ===
Originally constructed in 1806, the building began as the Bedford Methodist Church at the intersection of Baldwin and Succabone Roads (Bedford Four Corners). By the 1830s, the church faced a dwindling congregation due to local competition. In a remarkable feat of engineering for 1837, the structure was dismantled and transported two miles east to Bedford Village by 20 teams of oxen. The village faced a downturn when it was bypassed by the railroad, leading to the church’s eventual closure in 1916. When the building was put up for auction, rumors spread that it would be converted into a tenement house. Concerned residents took action, forming the Bedford Historical Society—one of the area's earliest preservation groups—to purchase the property and transform it into a community hub. Now known as Historical Hall, the preserved landmark serves as a venue for local gatherings.

=== 1829 School House ===
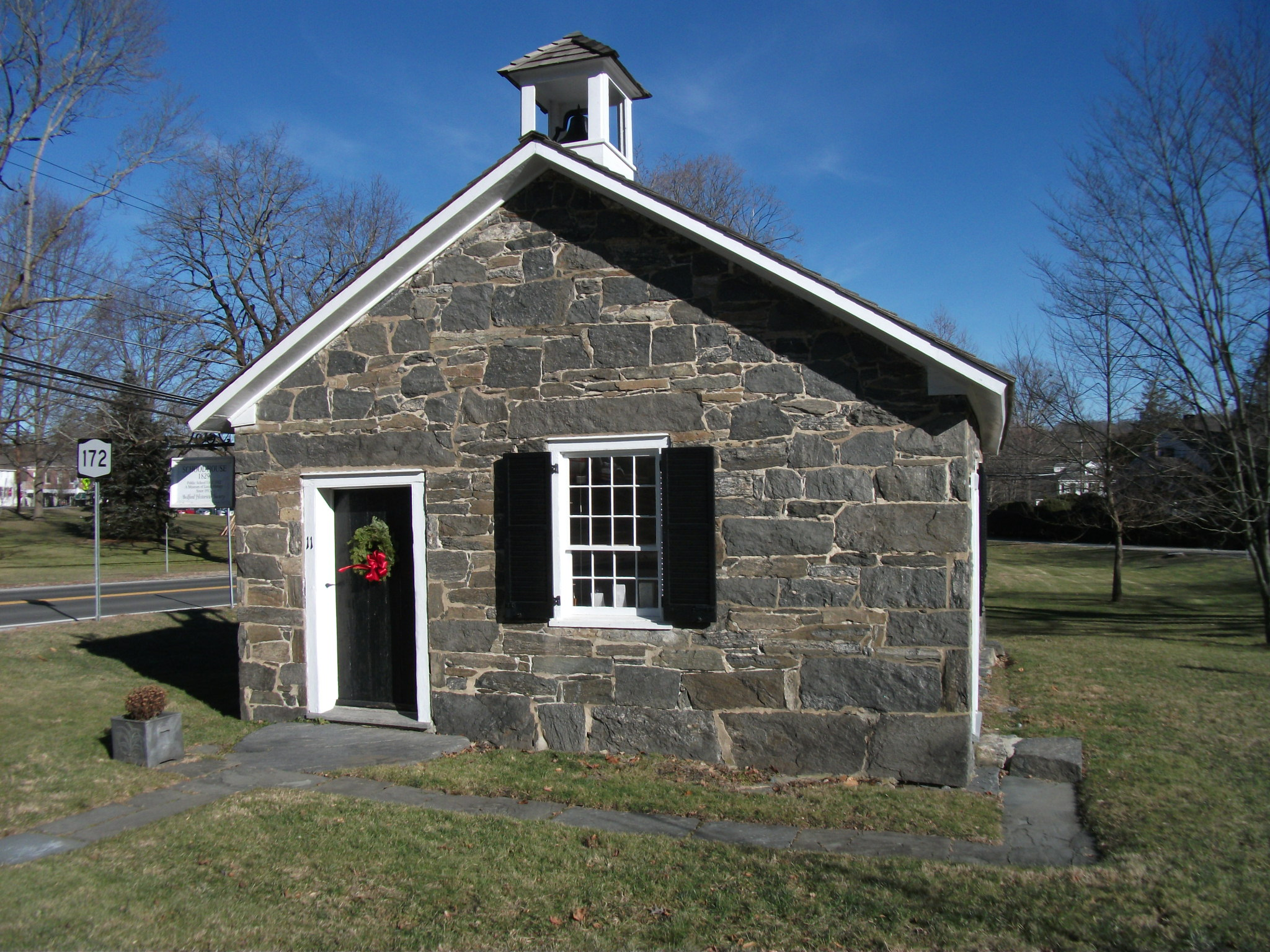
School House on the village green, built from stone

The school house was built in 1829 in the span of a few months. It had one room, which served for lessons in "grammar, spelling, arithmetic, history, geography, the Bible, and depending on the scholarship of the teacher, Latin and philosophy". A school library had books about history, travel, natural sciences, agriculture, biographies, and literature, listed in an 1843 directory. Sixty-two children were educated in 1842, but 27 of them were at school for four to five months only. When the school became too small for a growing population in 1912, the building was turned into a museum founded by the Bedford Agassiz Society in 1913. It has been run by the Bedford Historical Society since 1918. In 1970, the school became a special exhibit for historic education.

=== 1872 Presbyterian Church ===
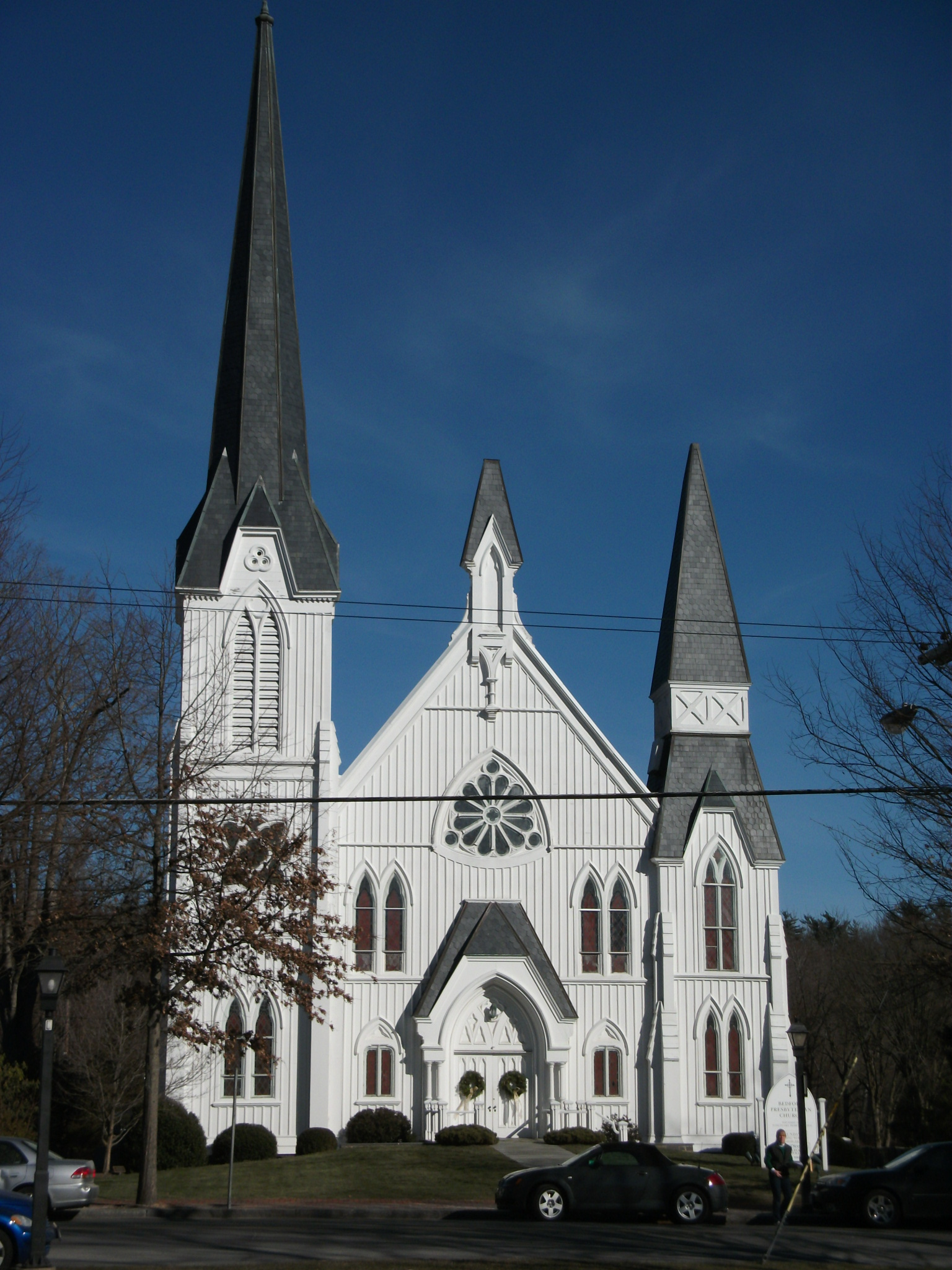
Bedford Presbyterian Church

Today's Presbyterian Church on the village green was built in 1872 as the fourth on the site. The first minister, Reverend Thomas Denham, settled in 1684, and a meeting house was built in 1689. When Bedford became part of New York, this house was transferred to Rye, New York. Bedford was part of the Anglican Church until the Revolution. A second meeting house was burned by the British in 1779. A third house was transferred to Westmoreland Sanctuary. The fourth church was built in 1872.

== See also ==
- National Register of Historic Places listings in northern Westchester County, New York
