= The Woodpile =

Historic house in New York, United States

- U.S. National Register of Historic Places
- U.S. Historic district
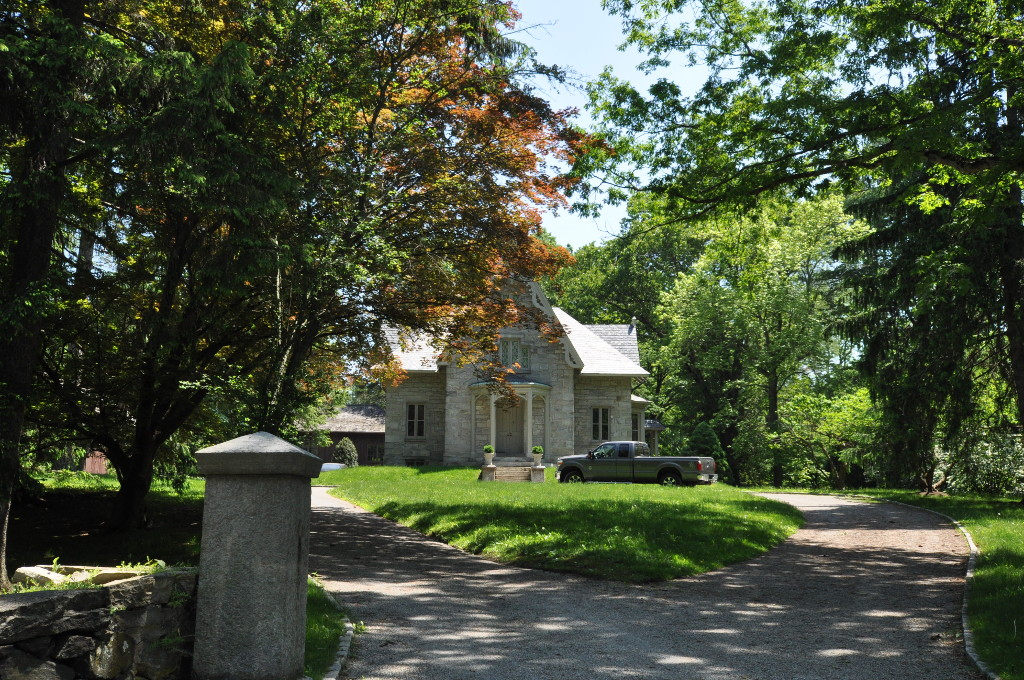
- Brambleworth

- Location within New York Location within the United States
- Location: Jct. of Croton Lake and Wood Rds., Bedford, New York
- Coordinates: 41°13′42″N 73°43′46″W
- Area: 122 acres (49 ha)
- Built: 1847
- Architect: Davis, A.J.; Hutton, Addison
- Architectural style: Second Empire, Italian Villa, Gothic Revival
- NRHP reference No.: 92000030
- Added to NRHP: February 10, 1992

The Woodpile is a historic family estate and national historic district located at Bedford, Westchester County, New York. The district contains 17 contributing buildings, four contributing sites, and nine contributing structures. The three primary residences are set on the east side of Croton Lake Road, one north of its junction with Wood Road and two south. All three look over a designed landscape on the west side of Croton Lake Road, which is part of the historic district. The oldest residence, known as Brambleworth, is a stone Gothic Revival cottage designed by A. J. Davis and completed in 1847. The middle residence, known as Evergreen Lawn, was built in 1856 and is in the Italian Villa style. The third residence, known as Braewold, was designed by architect Addison Hutton (1834–1916) and is a stone Second Empire style building built in 1870.

The district was added to the National Register of Historic Places in 1992.

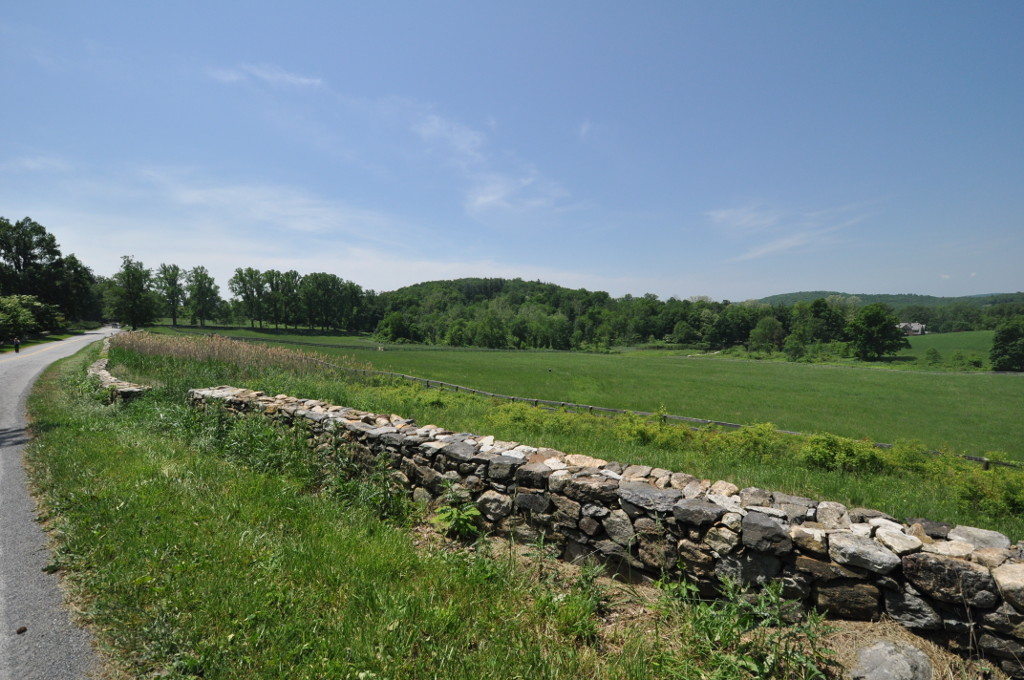
Landscape view of The Woodpile

== See also ==
- National Register of Historic Places listings in northern Westchester County, New York
