= Bedford (town), New York =

Bedford, New York
- Town
- Town of Bedford
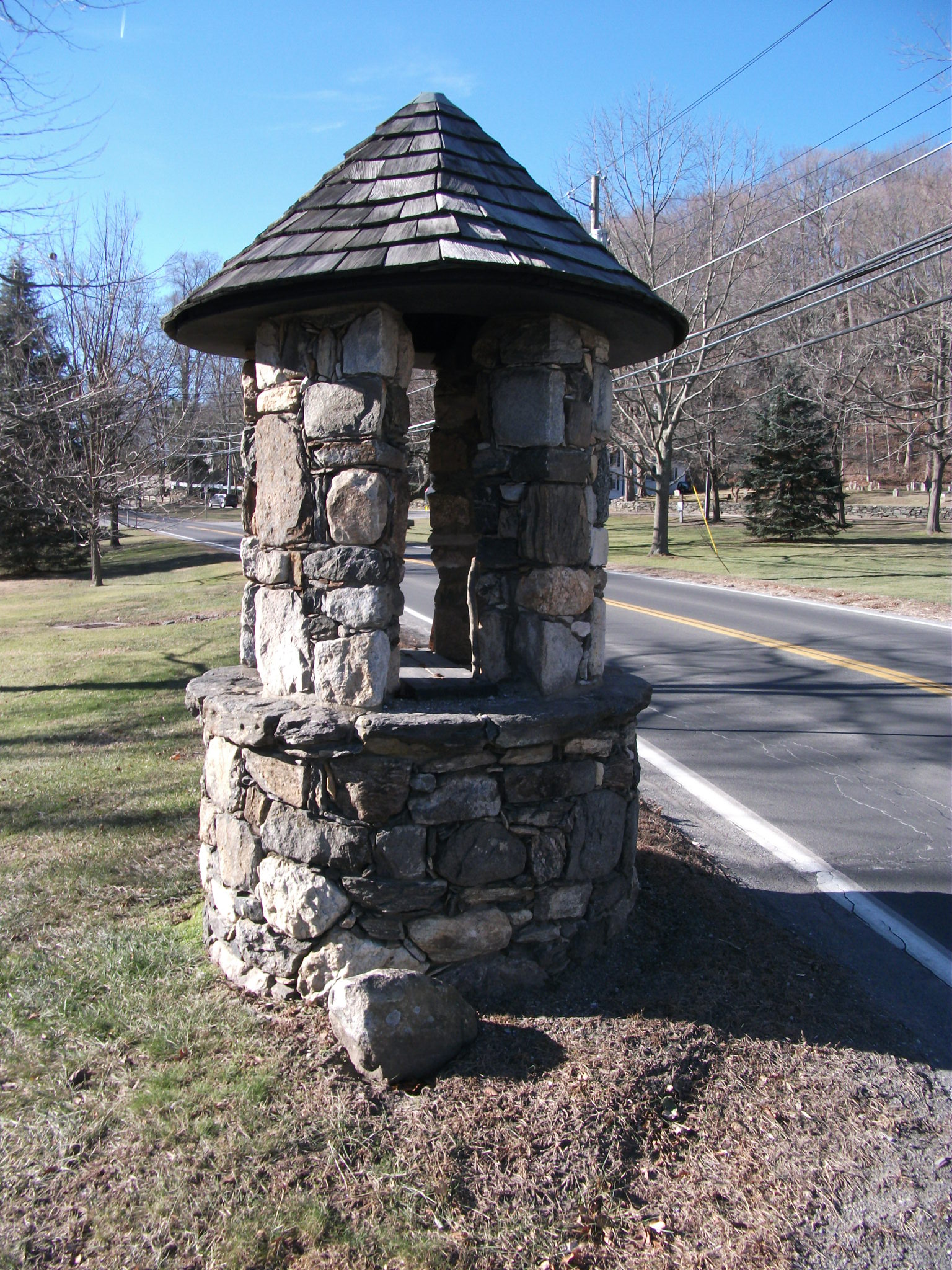
- Stone well in the Bedford Village Historic District

- Seal

- Location of Bedford in Westchester County, New York
- Coordinates: 41°13′33″N 73°39′54″W
- Country: United States
- State: New York
- County: Westchester
- Established: 1680

Government
  - Type: Manager-Council
  - Town Supervisor: Ellen Calves (D)
  - Town Board: Members: • Bobbi M. Bittker (D); • Stephanie McCaine (D); • Andres Castillo-Quintana (D); • Thomas Catoliato (D)

Area
  - Total: 39.42 sq mi (102.10 km^{2})
  - Land: 37.17 sq mi (96.27 km^{2})
  - Water: 2.25 sq mi (5.82 km^{2})
- Elevation: 381 ft (116 m)

Population (2020)
  - Total: 17,309
  - Density: 465.7/sq mi (179.8/km^{2})
- Time zone: UTC-5 (Eastern (EST))
  - Summer (DST): UTC-4 (EDT)
- ZIP codes: 10506, 10507, 10536, 10549
- Area code: 914
- FIPS code: 36119-05320
- GNIS feature ID: 978717
- Website: www.bedfordny.gov

Bedford is an incorporated town in Westchester County, New York, United States. The population was 17,309 at the 2020 census.

Bedford is located in the northeastern part of Westchester County and contains the three hamlets of Bedford Hills, Bedford, and Katonah.

== History ==
The town of Bedford was founded on December 23, 1680, when 22 Puritans from Stamford, Connecticut, purchased a tract of land three miles square known as the "Hopp Ground" from Chief Katonah and several other Native Americans for coats, blankets, wampum and cloth.

Bedford was made a part of Connecticut in 1697 when a patent fixed the boundaries as a six-mile square. Only when King William III of England issued a royal decree in 1700 settling a boundary dispute did Bedford become part of New York.

The town served as the county seat of Westchester County during the American Revolutionary War after the Battle of White Plains, until Bedford was burned by the British in July 1779. British forces led by Lieutenant Colonel Banastre Tarleton burned the town leaving only one structure standing in the town. After the Revolution, Bedford was made one of two seats of county government, alternating with White Plains, until 1870. Westchester County's oldest government building is the Court House in Bedford village, which was built in 1787 and renovated in the 1960s.

Stepping Stones - Historic Home of Bill & Lois Wilson (respective cofounders of Alcoholics Anonymous and Al-Anon Family Groups), Bedford Village Historic District, Caramoor Center for Music and the Arts, Palmer-Lewis Estate and The Woodpile are listed on the National Register of Historic Places.

== Geography ==
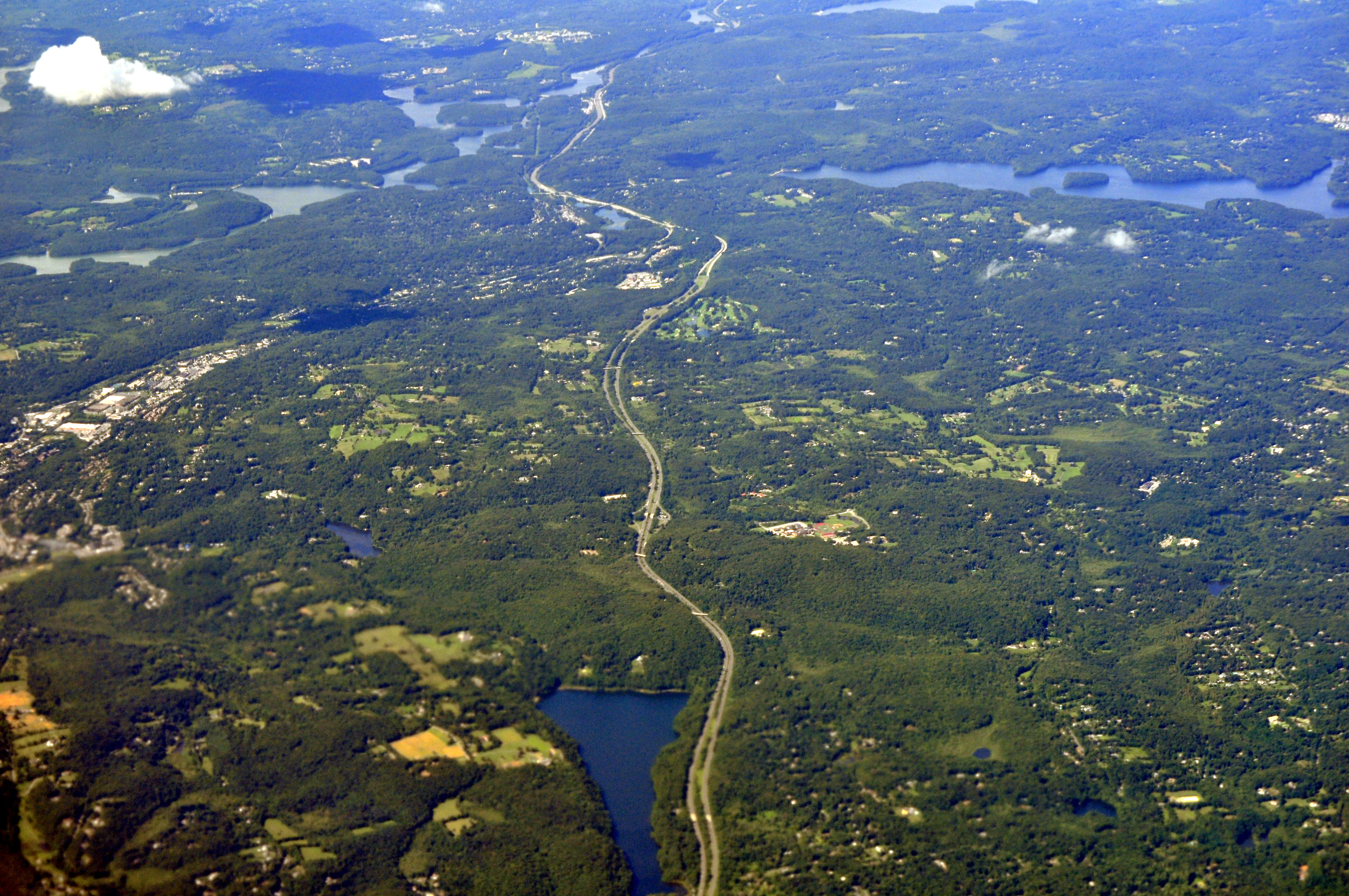
Aerial view of the town of Bedford along with neighboring towns.

According to the United States Census Bureau, the town has a total area of 39.4 square miles (102.1 km^{2}), of which 37.2 square miles (96.3 km^{2}) is land and 2.2 square miles (5.8 km^{2}), or 5.70%, is water. The town is bordered to the west by Mount Kisco, to the west and south by the town of New Castle, to the south by North Castle, to the north by Lewisboro, and to the east by Pound Ridge.

The Cross River Reservoir is situated on the northern portion of the town. The town is part of the Croton River watershed. The northern portion of the Byram Lake Reservoir is situated on the southern limits of the town.

The Mianus River runs throughout the town of Bedford. The northernmost point of the river is also located in the town. The river originates in a series of small ponds in Armonk and flows north into the town of Bedford. The river flows north along Greenwich Road and begins to turn just south of the Bedford Village Town Park before crossing Greenwich Road. The river reaches its northernmost point at the entrance of Middle Patent Road. The river then runs south and enters the Mianus River Gorge Preserve which is located in the town of Bedford. The river flows south through the entirety of the Mianus River Gorge Preserve and eventually leaves the town and enters Stamford, Connecticut.

== Landmarks ==
In the hamlet of Katonah are two national historic landmarks, which are "Stepping Stones - Historic Home of Bill & Lois Wilson" (home of the Alcoholics Anonymous co-founders; "Bill W.", who died in 1971 and "Lois W.", who died in 1988) and "John Jay Homestead", home of one of the United States Founding Fathers and first Chief Justice of the United States Supreme Court. Some minor landmarks are centered on Bedford Green in the Town of Bedford's Hamlet of "Bedford", a small patch of green space at the center of the Bedford Village Historic District (along Route 22), including the former court house, the oldest government building in Westchester County and now a museum. There is a small graveyard dating back to the founding of the town; the old one-room stone schoolhouse; and a few colonial-era houses, still lived in, which are kept painted white with black or green shutters.

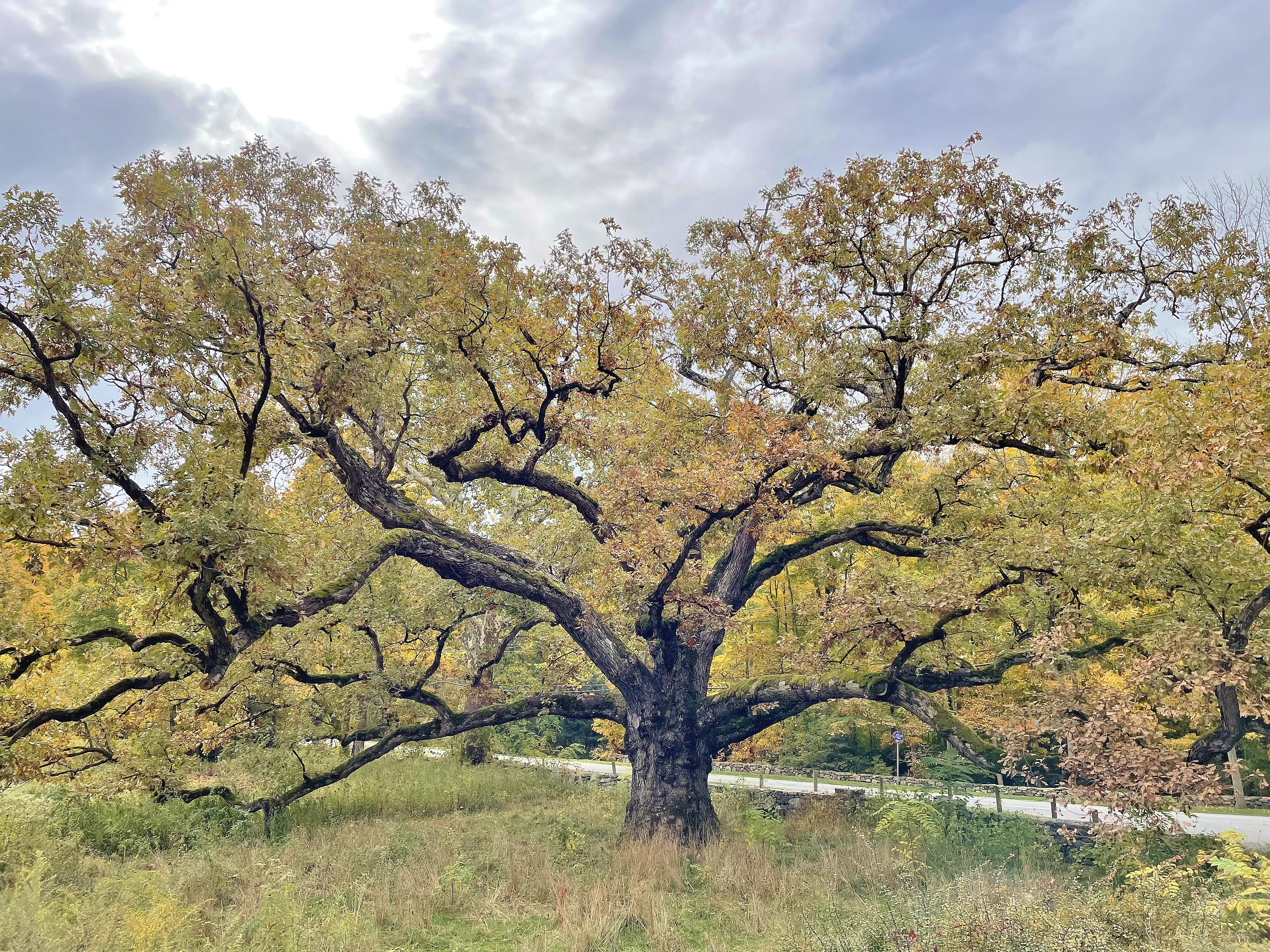
Bedford Oak, October 2022

The Bedford Free Library is located in Bedford on the village green. Along with the branches in Bedford Hills and Katonah, the Bedford Free Library is part of the Westchester Library System.

Along Route 22, at Hook Road, there is a large 500-plus-year-old white oak known as the Bedford Oak.

The Bedford Hills Correctional Facility for Women is located in the town.

== Demographics ==
Historical population
Census	Pop.	Note	%±
1790	2,470		—
1820	2,432		—
1830	2,750		13.1%
1840	2,822		2.6%
1850	3,207		13.6%
1860	3,639		13.5%
1870	3,697		1.6%
1880	3,731		0.9%
1890	3,291		−11.8%
1900	3,486		5.9%
1910	5,629		61.5%
1920	5,905		4.9%
1930	8,653		46.5%
1940	9,248		6.9%
1950	10,888		17.7%
1960	14,656		34.6%
1970	18,329		25.1%
1980	15,137		−17.4%
1990	16,906		11.7%
2000	18,133		7.3%
2010	17,335		−4.4%
2020	17,309		−0.1%
U.S. Decennial Census

As of the 2000 census, there were 18,133 people, 5,731 households and 4,395 families residing in the town. The population density was 486.9 inhabitants per square mile (188.0/km^{2}). There were 6,020 housing units at an average density of 161.6 units per square mile (62.4 units/km^{2}). The racial/ethnic makeup of the town was 87.5% white, 7.12% black, 1.98% Asian and 1.36% from two or more races. Hispanic or Latino of any race were 7.57% of the population. 0.09% ethnic Native American. .08% ethnic Pacific Islander and 1.88% from other ethnicities.

There were 5,731 households, out of which 41.0% had children under the age of 18 living with them, 67.5% were married couples living together, 6.9% had a female householder with no husband present and 23.3% were non-families. 18.8% of all households were made up of individuals, and 7.6% had someone living alone who was 65 years of age or older. The average household size was 2.82 and the average family size was 3.21.

In the town, the population was spread out, with 26.4% under the age of 18, 6.6% from 18 to 24, 32.2% from 25 to 44, 24.5% from 45 to 64 and 10.3% who were 65 years of age or older. The median age was 37 years. For every 100 females, there were 87.3 males. For every 100 females age 18 and over, there were 80.8 males.

The median income for a household in the town was $100,053 and the median income for a family was $118,820. Males had a median income of $88,561 versus $47,468 for females. The per capita income for the town was $53,046. About 2.4% of families and 4.9% of the population were below the poverty line, including 4.9% of those under age 18 and 3.3% of those of age 65 or over.

== Local media ==
The Recorder is a weekly newspaper founded in 2024 that reports on local issues in Bedford and other Northern Westchester communities, including Lewisboro, Pound Ridge, and Mount Kisco. The Recorder launched following the closure of the Record-Review, a weekly newspaper that began publishing in 1995. The Recorder received a two-year grant starting in 2025 from The New York Community Trust to increase access to credible news coverage on environmental and affordable housing issues in Northern Westchester.

== Communities and locations in Bedford ==
- Bedford Corners – A neighborhood bordering the village of Mount Kisco in the southern part of town.
- Bedford Hills – A hamlet in the western part of the town, just south of Katonah. The historic Richard H. Mandel House was added to the National Register of Historic Places in 1996.
- Bedford – A hamlet in the southeastern part of the town, commonly known as Bedford Village. The Bedford Village Historic District was added to the National Register of Historic Places in 1973.
- Katonah – A hamlet at the northern town line.

== Notable people who were born or resided in Bedford ==
- Joseph Abboud, fashion designer
- Paul André Albert, scientist and pioneering metallurgist with IBM
- Bea Arthur, actress, comedian and singer
- Billy Baldwin, actor
- Carter Bays, television producer, writer and showrunner
- Roger Bennett, host of Men in Blazers
- Gertrude Berg, actress and writer
- Chris Burdick, politician
- Mariah Carey, singer
- Chevy Chase, comedian, writer, and television and film actor; owns a home in Bedford
- Glenn Close, actress
- Henry Davis (baseball), baseball player
- Brendan Fraser, actor
- Peter B. Freund, sports team owner
- J. B. Gunn, physicist, lived on Guard Hill Road in Bedford, but with a Mt. Kisco mailing address
- Lasse Hallström, director
- Florence Jaffray Harriman, socialite, suffragist, and diplomat. The Harriman family estate in Bedford Corners has traditionally had a Mt. Kisco mailing address
- Robert A. Harris, film preservationist and producer
- Jim Henson, puppeteer, animator, cartoonist, actor, inventor, composer, and screenwriter
- Felicity Huffman, actress
- Carl Icahn, American business magnate
- Connor Ives, fashion designer
- John Jay, diplomat, Founding Father of the United States
- Robert F. Kennedy Jr., lawyer, activist, and 26th United States Secretary of Health and Human Services
- Michael J. Knowles, political commentator, podcaster and author
- Ralph Lauren, fashion designer
- Blake Lively, actress
- Joseph L. Mankiewicz, director, screenwriter, producer
- Kate Mara, actress
- Rooney Mara, actress
- E. G. Marshall, actor
- Collin McLoughlin, singer and music producer
- Lena Olin, actress
- Jennifer O'Neill, actress and author
- Chazz Palminteri, actor and writer
- Nelson Peltz, billionaire financier
- Nicola Peltz, actress
- Lily Rabe, actress
- Phil Ramone, music producer
- Christopher Reeve, actor
- Dana Reeve, actress, singer, activist
- Claudio Reyna, former professional soccer player
- Giovanni Reyna, professional soccer player
- Ryan Reynolds, actor
- Paul Shaffer, musician
- Alex Shoumatoff, writer who profiled Bedford in 1999 for Vanity Fair, and in his 1978 book, Westchester.
- Ted Sorel, actor who resided in the hamlet of Katonah
- George Soros, billionaire investor, philanthropist and hedge fund manager
- Michael Steinhardt, billionaire investor, founder of Taglit Birthright
- Martha Stewart, television show host
- Rob Thomas, lead singer of Matchbox Twenty
- Donald Trump, current President of the United States
- Melania Trump, current First Lady of the United States
- Loudon Wainwright III, singer, songwriter, actor
- Bruce Willis, actor
- Marissa Jaret Winokur, actor
- Yasmeen Ghauri, former supermodel
- Trevor Zegras, professional hockey player

== See also ==
- Bedford, England
