= Bedford (CDP), New York =

Bedford, New York
- Census-designated place
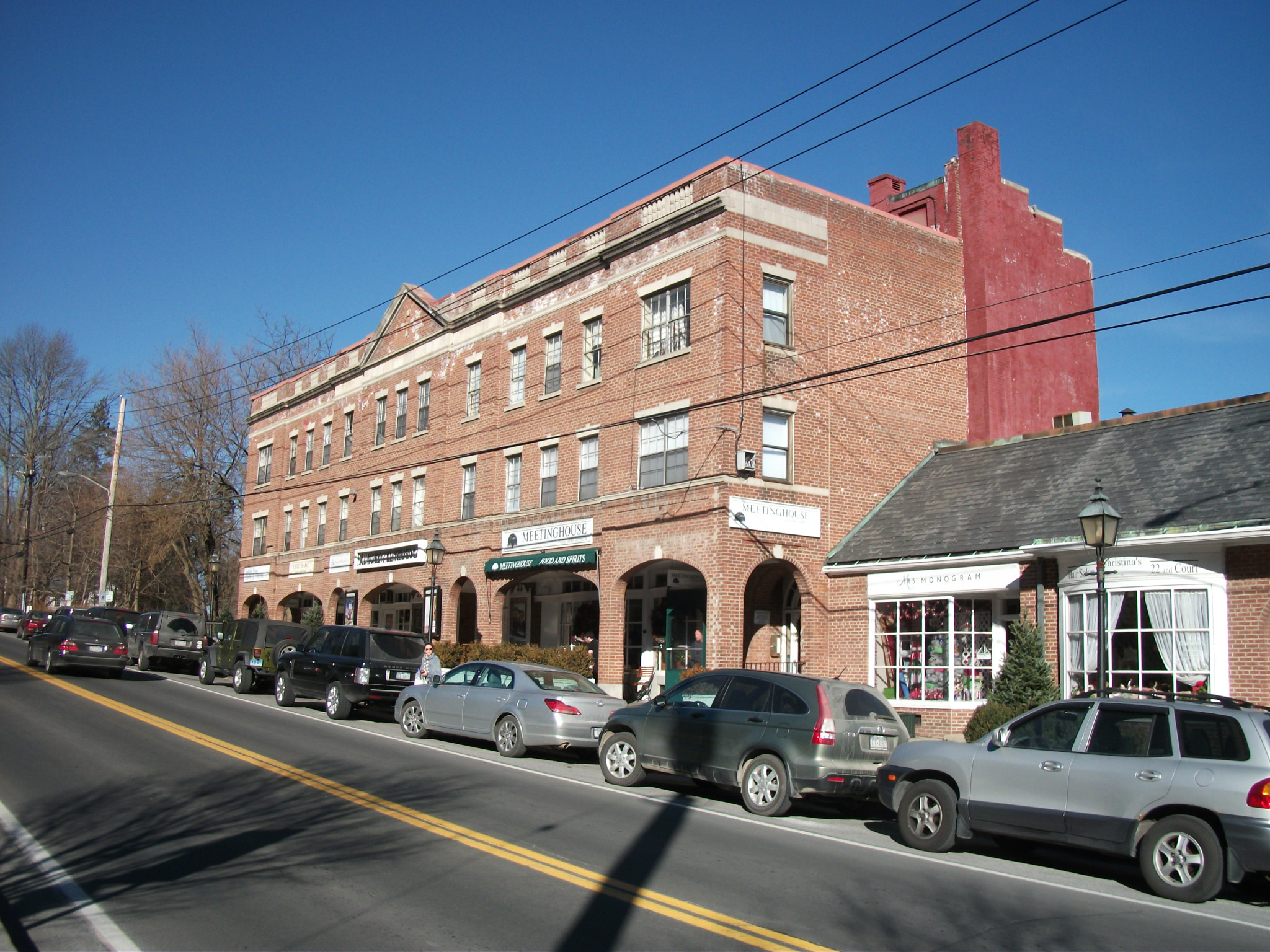
- Historic three-story brick buildings in Bedford

- Location of Bedford in New York
- Coordinates: 41°11′38″N 73°38′32″W
- Country: United States
- State: New York
- County: Westchester
- Town: Bedford

Area
  - Total: 3.61 sq mi (9.34 km^{2})
  - Land: 3.56 sq mi (9.22 km^{2})
  - Water: 0.046 sq mi (0.12 km^{2})
- Elevation: 377 ft (115 m)

Population (2020)
  - Total: 1,691
  - Density: 475.1/sq mi (183.42/km^{2})
- Time zone: UTC-5 (Eastern (EST))
  - Summer (DST): UTC-4 (EDT)
- ZIP code: 10506
- Area code: 914
- FIPS code: 36-05309
- GNIS feature ID: 0943485

Bedford is a hamlet and census-designated place (CDP) located in the town of Bedford in Westchester County, New York, United States. The population was 1,834 at the 2010 census.

== Geography ==
According to the United States Census Bureau, the community has a total area of 3.6 square miles (9.2 km^{2}), of which 3.5 square miles (9.1 km^{2}) is land and 0.039 square miles (0.1 km^{2}), or 1.35%, is water.

== Demographics ==
Historical population
Census	Pop.	Note	%±
2000	1,724		—
2010	1,834		6.4%
2020	1,691		−7.8%
U.S. Decennial Census

As of the census of 2000, there were 1,724 people, 577 households, and 492 families residing in the community. The population density was 468.0 inhabitants per square mile (180.7/km^{2}). There were 600 housing units at an average density of 162.9 per square mile (62.9/km^{2}). The racial makeup of the community was 96.75% White, 0.29% Black or African American, 1.86% Asian, 0.41% from other races, and 0.70% from two or more races. Hispanic or Latino of any race were 2.32% of the population.

There were 577 households, out of which 44.4% had children under the age of 18 living with them, 77.5% were married couples living together, 5.4% had a female householder with no husband present, and 14.6% were non-families. 10.7% of all households were made up of individuals, and 4.9% had someone living alone who was 65 years of age or older. The average household size was 2.95 and the average family size was 3.18.

In the community, the population was spread out, with 29.6% under the age of 18, 2.6% from 18 to 24, 26.2% from 25 to 44, 30.1% from 45 to 64, and 11.5% who were 65 years of age or older. The median age was 40 years. For every 100 females, there were 100.0 males. For every 100 females age 18 and over, there were 96.3 males.

The median income for a household in the community was $120,325, and the median income for a family was $118,848. Males had a median income of $81,898 versus $52,375 for females. The per capita income for the community was $56,868. About 1.3% of families and 2.4% of the population were below the poverty line, including 3.8% of those under age 18 and 4.2% of those age 65 or over.

== Education ==
The school district is Bedford Central School District.

== See also ==
- Bedford Village Historic District
