= Lord & Burnham Building =

- U.S. National Register of Historic Places
- U.S. Historic district – Contributing property
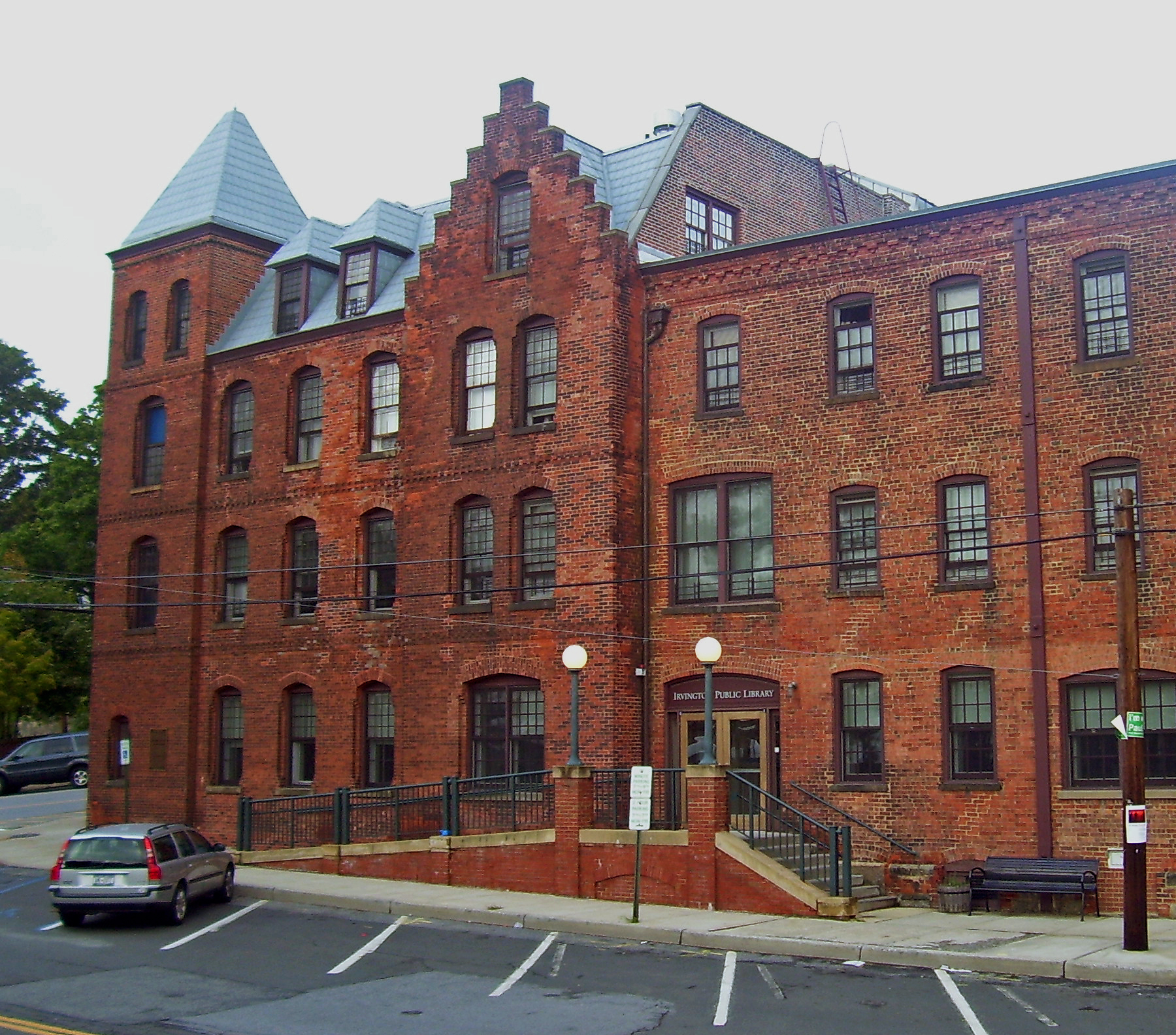
- West elevation, 2007
- Location: Irvington, NY
- Nearest city: Yonkers, NY
- Coordinates: 41°2′22″N 73°52′21″W
- Area: 0.8 acre (3,200 m^{2})
- Built: 1881
- Architectural style: Queen Anne
- Part of: Irvington Historic District (ID01300195)
- NRHP reference No.: 99000193
- Added to NRHP: February 12, 1999

The Lord & Burnham Building, located at the corner of Main and Astor Streets in Irvington, New York, United States, is a brick building in the Queen Anne architectural style built in the 1880s. In 1999 it was listed on the National Register of Historic Places, and was added as a contributing property to the Irvington Historic District in 2014.

From 1870 on it had been home to Lord's Horticultural Works, a builder of boilers and conservatories that had relocated to Irvington to better serve the owners of the many Hudson Valley estates who were its main clients. A fire destroyed the original building; it was replaced by the current structure. As Lord & Burnham, it continued its business until 1988. The building currently houses condominium apartments and the village's public library.

== Building ==
The former factory occupies an 0.8-acre (3,200 m^{2}) lot at the southeast corner of the intersection, across Astor Street from the village's train station. At the west end of Irvington's downtown, the surrounding buildings on Main and Astor are primarily two-story commercial structures from the late 19th and early 20th centuries. To its south is a parking lot; additional spaces are also located along both sides of Astor to serve commuters. Across the railroad tracks are some other large industrial structures once used by Lord & Burnham, now known as the Bridge Street Properties which have also been redeveloped. The terrain is level towards the Hudson River to the west, and rises sharply to the east, reflecting the bluffs of the river.

=== Main block and factory wing ===
Three sections, all of brick laid in common bond, make up the building itself. The main block, originally the company's offices, is the six-by-six-bay four-story portion at the corner, topped by a mansard roof covered in tin shingles. At the very corner is a tower with pyramidal roof similarly clad. It is complemented by a two-bay gabled pavilion on the north facade and a similar-sized stepped-gabled pavilion on the south at the opposite ends of their respective facades.

All fenestration has splayed-brick segmental-arched openings. They are mostly set with 16-over-4 double-hung sash windows; on the southernmost bay of the ground floor there is a double window. Patterned brick beltcourses delineate all three stories. Between the pavilion and tower the roof is pierced by two hipped-roofed dormer windows on either facade. The south and east elevations, away from the street, are randomly set with six-over-six double-hung sash.

A sympathetic brick set of steps to what is now the library's main entrance, with a wheelchair ramp, is at the juncture between the main block and the former factory wing. It extends to the south, thirteen bays long by five wide and three stories high with a gently pitched gabled roof. Its decorative treatment is a corbelled cornice at the roofline. The modern entrance doors are located in a double-width opening repeated above it and in the third and ninth bays to its south. All windows are six-over-six double-hung sash, with some in the randomly filled bays on the south facade overlooking the parking lot. In the center of its east facade, otherwise similarly treated as the west one, is a modern three-by-three-bay full height projecting pavilion with glass facing on the north and south.

=== Carriage house ===
From the east facade of the main block a modern hyphen, not considered to be contributing to the building's historic character, connects it to the former stable/carriage house. It is a three-story brick Queen Anne structure with a gabled metal roof, stepped on the south (rear) elevation. In the gable field it is faced with scalloped wooden shingle and false half-timbering.

The original vehicular entrance, on the east side of the stable's north (front) facade, has been bricked in. A round-arched pedestrian entrance and rectangular window are to the west. In the center of the second story is a projecting oriel window; each of its facets has four-over-four double-hung sash. On the third story is a group of three nine-over-six double-hung sash. The other three elevations have randomly placed windows in their brick. An exposed portion of the basement on the south elevation is concealed by a modern shed.

=== Interior ===
Inside, the building has been extensively modified from its original plan both during its days as a factory and afterwards for conversion into apartments and a library. Some original features remain in the main block. Most significant among them is the stairway at the main entrance. It has pine beadboard walls, chamfered newel posts topped by balls and molded railings. The third-floor door has its original window with 27 small glass panes and three large ones amid three wooden panels, topped by a three-light transom.

Original beadboard paneling remains on the second story, along with the original window surrounds and their rosette corners. The original wooden trusses are still visible in the factory wing, making it possible to see that its third floor is carries by suspension rods from the roof trusses. The stable has been extensively modified after its original use was discontinued, but it retains its original stair as well and some of its woodwork.

== History ==
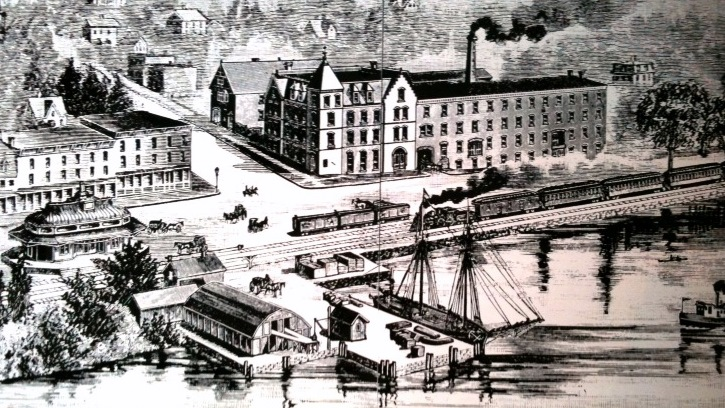
Building complex c.1890

In 1849 Frederick Lord, a carpenter in the upstate city of Buffalo, began building greenhouses for his customers. It became his full-time business, Lord's Horticultural Works, by 1856. He moved to Syracuse. In 1869 he took in his son-in-law, William Burnham, as a partner. He had also developed new methods of ventilating his buildings, and this led the company to enter the residential boiler market in 1873. It perfected its original cast iron sectional boiler design five years later and it became one of the top-selling models.

Seven years later, in 1876, the firm moved to Irvington, close to its largest group of customers, the wealthy owners of large estates along the Hudson River north of New York City. The company worked from an existing building on the current site until it was destroyed in an 1881 fire. The current complex was built very quickly to replace it; it is not known who the architect is but it is likely that it was Frederick Lord himself. A map of the village from that year suggests that the factory wing may incorporate part of the original building.

That year, the firm was also working on an important commission from railroad magnate Jay Gould. He, too, was replacing a burnt building, in his case the conservatories at Lyndhurst, his estate in nearby Tarrytown, today a National Historic Landmark (NHL). Lord built the first iron frame greenhouse in the country, revolutionizing the industry.

Records from 1890 show that the company complex included a boiler shop, ironworks, carpentry shop and two lumber sheds. An insurance map says it employed 30 people. Shortly before Lord's death that year, the company name was changed to Lord & Burnham. In the years afterward it began filling in the Hudson across the tracks and building on it, expanding its facilities by about four acres (1.6 ha) by 1895.

This was the period when Lord & Burnham was the market leader in building greenhouses. In addition to Lyndhurst, the company built the Enid Haupt Conservatory at what is now the New York Botanical Garden, another NHL, and the conservatory at the Buffalo and Erie County Botanical Gardens, listed on the Register today as a contributing property to the Cazenovia Park-South Park System. By 1903 the company's catalog boasted that the Irvington plant was the country's largest greenhouse production facility. Nine years later it claimed to employ 250 there, including a design staff with 18 engineers. Burnham served as an elected village official for short periods, as did Lord's son.

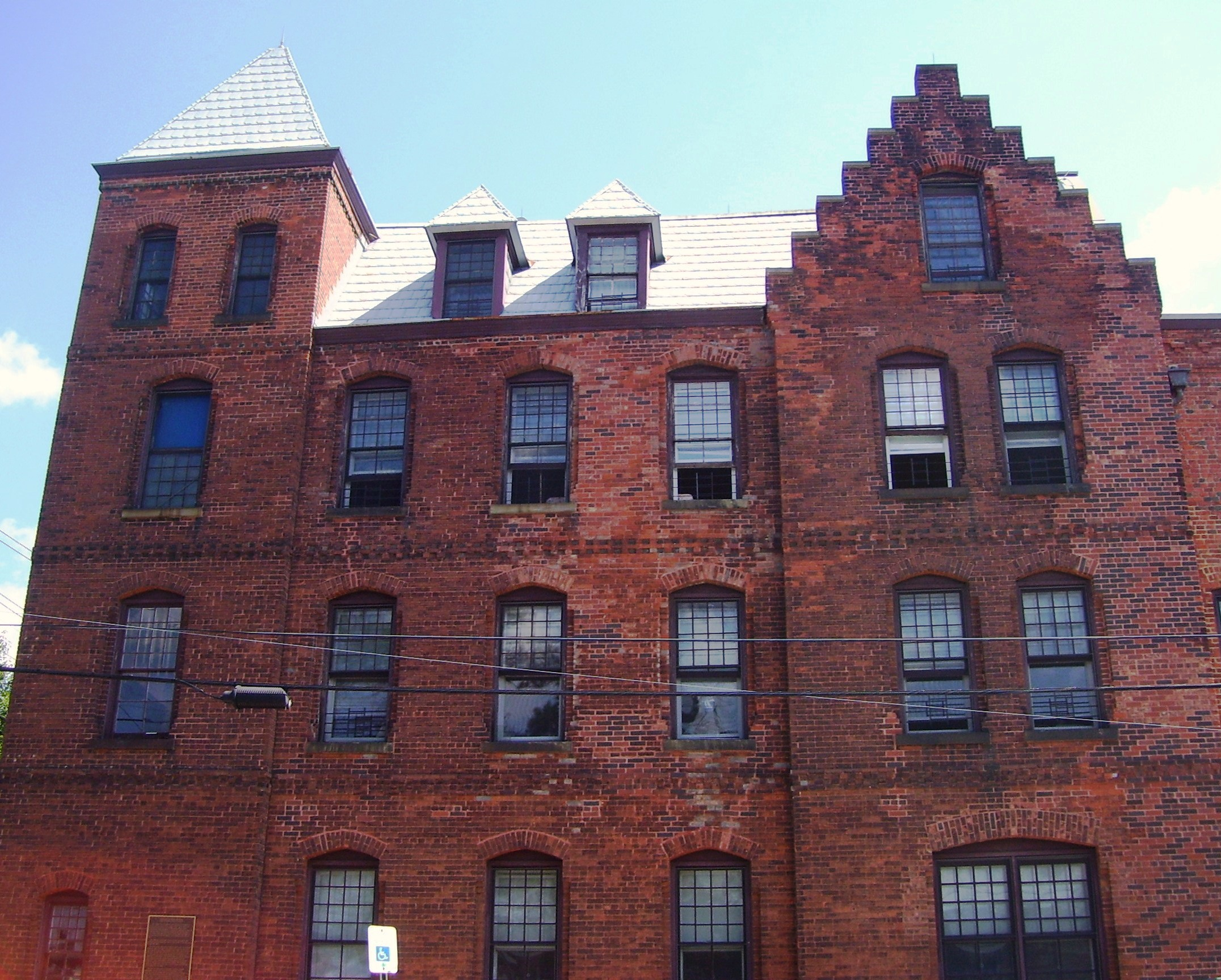
A closer view of the building

Greenhouses were always erected at the factory before being disassembled and shipped for quality assurance purposes. The company claimed several other innovations in addition to the iron framing it had developed for Lyndhurst. It opened factories elsewhere in the country by the 1920s, and by 1930 it held nine patents related to greenhouse manufacture.

During this period, greenhouse sales began to decline as only the truly wealthy could afford them. Boiler sales displaced greenhouses as the largest source of the company's profits. By the late 1940s Burnham Boilers had become a separate division headquartered in Lancaster, Pennsylvania, with its casting plant in Zanesville, Ohio. The company itself moved there in 1987; by then just 12 people worked in Irvington. All greenhouse production ended the next year and the factory was closed.

The village did not want the building to stay empty for long. Its public library needed more space, and plans were soon finalized to convert 10,000 square feet (930 m^{2}) of the factory wing into the new library, with 22 residential units upstairs. Architect Stephen Tilly of nearby Dobbs Ferry oversaw the $2.4 million project, which was completed in 2000.

== See also ==
- National Register of Historic Places listings in southern Westchester County, New York
