= Statue of Rip Van Winkle =

Statue in Irvington, New York

Coordinates: 41°2′21.38″N 73°52′3.5″W

Rip Van Winkle is a life-size bronze statue of Washington Irving's literary character from his 1819 short story, Rip Van Winkle, in Irvington, New York. It was designed by Richard Masloski and unveiled in 2002.

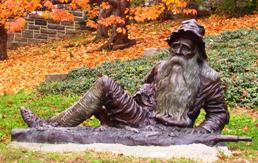
Statue of Rip Van Winkle in Irvington, New York

== Description ==
Rip Van Winkle depicts the literary character reclining. He has a large beard and crumpled hat and his eyes are half-open as if he has just woken up. His boots and hands blend in with the ground like he has become part of the ground.

It is located on Irvington's Main Street under a beech tree between Town Hall and the Main Street School. It was unveiled in Irvington on September 21, 2002.

Rip Van Winkle weighs 1,400 pounds and was cast in bronze in the Polich Art Works foundry in Newburgh, New York. According to its artist Masloski, it was created from a smaller model of Rip Van Winkle in 21 stages. The six-foot-long sculpture took 10 months to complete.

== Origin ==
The statue was commissioned to commemorate the American author Washington Irving, the namesake of Irvington. Rip Van Winkle is a literary character created by Irving in the short story of the same name who falls asleep in the Catskill Mountains for 20 years after drinking a strange brew. Irving's story of Rip Van Winkle is based on a German legend. Even though the story takes place further north in the Catskills, this location was chosen due to its proximity to the Hudson River, which was in much of Irving's works, and due to Irvington's namesake.

The idea for the statue was part of a larger effort to make Washington Irving more present in Irvington. Washington Irving lived nearby in his home, Sunnyside in Tarrytown, New York and the village of Irvington was named for him in 1854. Barbe Crowley, then vice president of Irvington's Chamber of Commerce, said of the project, "This will become a tie to our past, a way to keep history alive and visible. We have a lot to be proud of, not the least of which is our town's namesake.'' The statue was also commissioned in the hopes of bringing tourists to Irvington and business to Irvington's Main Street district.

This statue is the second Irving-inspired work in Irvington after the Washington Irving Memorial designed by Daniel Chester French in 1927.

== Artist ==
Richard Walter Masloski (1954–2018) was an Orange County-based artist and a self-described sculptor of Americana. He had also designed the Westchester County Police Memorial in White Plains and veteran memorials in Wappinger and in Orange County. He designed many bronze statues of historical and legendary American figures.

== Funding ==
In what is called the Irvington RIP Project – a fundraising effort where they sold Rip Van Winkle coloring books, bookmarks, magnets, and student-created drawings – Irvington's Chamber of Commerce raised $60,000 for the project. Many items were donated to be auctioned off at the town's historic Octagon House to raise money for the project.
