= Bridge Street Properties =

- Former names: Lord & Burnham Corporation

General information
- Status: Completed
- Type: Commercial Offices
- Location: 1 Bridge Street; Irvington, NY, 10533
- Coordinates: 41°2′27.42″N 73°52′23.33″W
- Construction started: 1904
- Completed: 1908
- Operator: Cushman & Wakefield

Technical details
- Floor area: 205,000 sq ft (19,045 m^{2})

Design and construction
- Developer: Bridge Street Properties, LLC.

Bridge Street Properties is the name given to the redevelopment of a factory site on the Hudson River in Irvington, New York, United States. Originally built between 1904 and 1912, the 205,000 square feet (19,000 m^{2}) site now houses various commercial and retail companies in 600 square feet (56 m^{2}) to 40,000 square feet (3,700 m^{2}) office suites and lofts.

== History ==
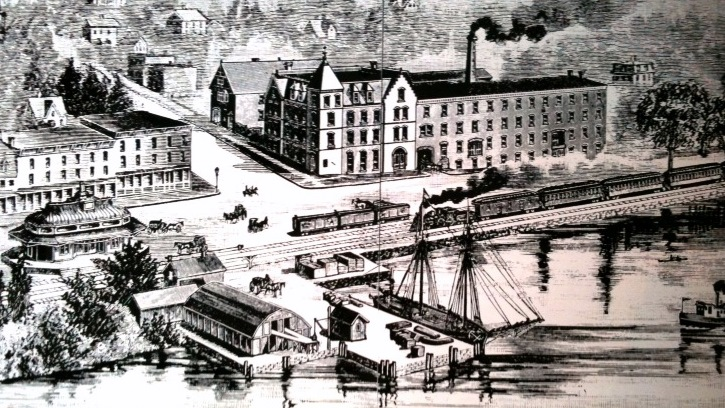
The Irvington waterfront between 1859 and 1889, showing the Lord & Burnham Building on the right, before landfilling began to create what would become the Bridge Street Properties site

=== Lord & Burnham ===
Lord & Burnham company moved to Irvington in 1856 to be closer to the great estates that served as a market for the company's products, its celebrated glass conservatories. Beginning in 1894, the company purchased underwater property beyond the tracks and began filling in to create new land for an expansion. The expansion complex was completed by 1912, at which time the company employed 250 men.

The company used the property as additional factory space in the production process of their greenhouses. By 1988, only about a dozen employees remained at the Irvington factory, and Lord and Burnham ceased to exist when the factory closed in that year.

=== Bridge Street Properties, LLC. ===
In 1995 Bridge Street Properties, LLC. purchased the building from Lord & Burnham Greenhouses with the intentions of converting the property into a more usable commercial space. The former factory was renovated and restored, allowing for various commercial businesses and restaurants to take residence in the building. Bridge Street Properties has made a number of enhancements to the property including the construction of a new three-story building along the water in 2003.

== Rezoning effort ==
In February 2007, Bridge Street Properties petitioned the town of Irvington to change the zoning of the site from an Industrial Zone to a Mixed-use zone in order to facilitate the construction of 19 townhomes and new retail space in an effort to revitalize the area. After many negotiations with the town, the petition was withdrawn in February 2009 and the planned townhomes and retail space were never realized.

== Notable events ==
Scenic Hudson Gala

In May 2008, the developers of the Bridge Street properties were honoured by Scenic Hudson, a group dedicated to encouraging environmentally friendly development, for the renovation of the property. The Bridge Street buildings comply with New York State's Green building Initiative, ensuring that the development is eco-friendly. Additionally, Scenic Hudson recognized the developers for providing areas where the public can enjoy magnificent views of the Hudson River and Palisades.

== Notable tenants ==
- CrossFit Valkyrie - an exercise and nutrition program
- Eileen Fisher - a women's clothing retailer
- Flat World Knowledge - an educational publisher
- House Party, Inc. - a marketing company
- Red Hat on the River - a restaurant
- PECO Pallet, Inc. - a pallet pooling services and logistics
- The Sundheim Group - a management consultancy
- Steps Therapy- an Applied Behavioral Analysis (ABA) company working with children on the autism spectrum
