= Irvington, New York =

Irvington on Hudson, New York
- Village
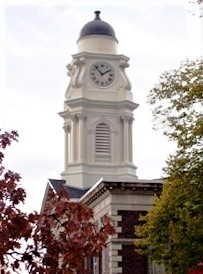
- Irvington Town Hall

- Seal

- Location of Irvington, New York
- Coordinates: 41°2′4″N 73°51′56″W
- Country: United States
- State: New York
- County: Westchester
- Town: Greenburgh

Government
  - Mayor: Arlene Burgos

Area
  - Total: 4.08 sq mi (10.57 km^{2})
  - Land: 2.79 sq mi (7.23 km^{2})
  - Water: 1.29 sq mi (3.34 km^{2})
- Elevation: 125 ft (38 m)

Population (2020)
  - Total: 6,653
  - Density: 2,384.5/sq mi (920.67/km^{2})
- Time zone: UTC-5 (Eastern (EST))
  - Summer (DST): UTC-4 (EDT)
- ZIP code: 10533; 10503 (Ardsley-on-Hudson)
- Area code: 914
- FIPS code: 36-37803
- GNIS feature ID: 0953803
- Website: www.irvingtonny.gov

Irvington, sometimes known as Irvington-on-Hudson, is a suburban village of the town of Greenburgh in Westchester County, New York, United States. It is a suburb of New York City, 20 miles (32 km) north of Midtown Manhattan in New York City, and is served by a station stop on the Metro-North Hudson Line. To the north of Irvington is the village of Tarrytown, to the south the village of Dobbs Ferry, and to the east unincorporated parts of Greenburgh, including East Irvington. Irvington includes within its boundaries the community of Ardsley-on-Hudson, which has its own ZIP code and Metro-North station, but which should not be confused with the nearby village of Ardsley.

The population of Irvington at the 2020 census was 6,652. Because many of Irvington's residents – especially those in the upper income brackets – live in Irvington and work in New York City, the village has a reputation as a "commuter town" or a "bedroom community".

The village's half-mile-long (0.8 kilometers) Main Street area has been designated as a historic district by New York state and on January 15, 2014, was added to the National Register of Historic Places. In 2010, Westchester Magazine ranked Irvington as the "Best Place to Live in Westchester".

== History ==
Before the area where Irvington is now located was settled by Europeans, it was inhabited by the Wickquasgeck, a band of the Wappingers, related to the Lenape (Delaware) tribes which dominated lower New York state and New Jersey. (Note: The name of the Indian band has variously been spelled Wiechquaeskeck, Wechquaesqueck, Weckquaesqueek, Wecquaesgeek, Weekquaesguk, Wickquasgeck, Wickquasgek, Wiequaeskeek, Wiequashook, and Wiquaeskec. The spelling given here is one widely used for the original name of Broadway in lower Manhattan: "The Wickquasgeck Trail". The meaning of the name, however spelled, has been given as "the end of the marsh, swamp or wet meadow", "place of the bark kettle", and "birch bark country". See Trumbull, James Hammond (1881), Indian Names of Places, Etc., in and on the Borders of Connecticut, With Interpretations of Some of Them Hartford: Case, Lockwood & Brainard Company. p.81) The Wickquasgeck still lived in the area as late as 1775.

After the Dutch came to the area in the 1600s, the land was part of the Bisightick tract of the Adrian Van der Donck grant. Early settlers in the Irvington area were Stephen Ecker, Jan Harmes, Captain John Buckhout, and Barent Dutcher. The Van der Donck grant was purchased by Frederick Philipse in 1682, after the British had taken over the area in 1664. At first it was settled by tenant farmers, but by the 1700s, most of the settlers were artisans. The King's Highway – later the Albany Post Road, and now Broadway – which connected New York City with Albany, was built through the settlement by the 1720s, which created a need for inns and taverns to supplement Odell's Tavern, which was built in 1690.

In 1785, the state of New York confiscated the Phillipse's land from his grandson, Frederick Philipse III, after he sided with the British in the American Revolution, and sold it to local patriot farmers who had been tenants of the Phillipse family. This is presumably how part of it came to be the farm of William Dutcher. Dutcher sold half of his farm to Justus Dearman in 1817, who then sold it to Gustavo F. Sacchi in 1848 for $26,000. Sacchi sold the parcel to John Jay – the grandson of the American Founding Father by the same name – that same year, and Jay laid it out as a village which he called "Dearman", after Justus Dearman, and sold lots at auction in New York City starting on April 25, 1850.

The organization of the streets into a right-angled grid pattern was criticized by Andrew Jackson Downing, who was at the time the foremost expert on landscape design. Downing condemned the use of the street grid outside of cities and saw the hilly and heavily wooded site of Dearman as particularly suited to his own theories, which called for curvilinear roads and irregular lots which followed the contours of the land. With the frequent steamboat, stagecoach, and train transportation available, he felt that Dearman could have been an ideal suburb, instead of "mere rows of houses upon streets crossing each other at right angles and bordered with shade trees".

The side streets off the village's Main Street – or "Main Avenue", as an 1868 map has it – were originally designated "A", "B", "C", and so forth, but are today named after the area's early settlers, (Note: In order, from the river going up the hill along Main Street, the streets are Astor, Buckhout, Cottenet, Dutcher, Ecker, Ferris and Grinnell, until the pattern is broken by Croton Place and Aqueduct Lane, followed by Dearman Street, the last side street before Broadway.) such as Barent and William Dutcher, Captain John Buckhout (who lived to 103) and Wolfert Ecker (or "Acker"). Many of these family names are found on the 18th-century gravestones in the historic Old Dutch Burying Ground in Sleepy Hollow.

=== American Revolution ===
Wolfert Ecker's house, then owned by the Revolutionary War hero Jacob van Tassel, was burned by the British during the war because it had become a notorious hang-out for American patriots. Washington Irving later wrote about it under the name of "Wolfert's Roost" ("roost" meaning "rest"), and purchased and re-modeled another house on the land to become "Sunnyside". Another early settler was Capt. Jan Harnse, and the Harnse-Conklin-Odell Tavern on Broadway was built in 1693 and became an inn in 1743. (See below) It was at Odell's Tavern that the Committee of Safety, the executive committee of the legislature of the new State of New York, officially received the news that George Washington had lost the Battle of Long Island, and, later, British troops camped nearby, putting Jonathan Odell into custody in the Old Dutch Church in Sleepy Hollow. No major battles of the Revolutionary War were fought in the area, only minor skirmishes between residents and soldiers.

With the capture of New York City by the British, Irvington and the rest of southern Westchester County became the "Neutral Ground," an unofficial 30-mile (48 km) wide buffer zone separating British-occupied territory from that held by the Americans, and the people of the area who remained – many of the Patriot population had fled – traded with both sides to some profit. However, there was also a great deal of pillaging and plundering, even of Tory households, both by the regular British army and loyalist militias and irregulars, all in the name of hunting down "rebels." By the time the war was over, the countryside had been ravaged:

The country is rich and fertile, and the farms appear to have been advantageously cultivated, but it now has the marks of a country in ruins, a large portion of the proprietors having abandoned their homes. On the high road where heretofore was a continuous stream of travelers and vehicles, not a single traveler was seen from week to week, month to month. The countryside was silent. The very tracks of the carriages were grown over with grass or weeds. Travelers walked along bypaths. The villages are abandoned, the residents having fled to the north, leaving their homes, where possible, in charge of elder persons and servants.

Eventually, the area recovered and continued to develop. The Hudson River Railroad reached the settlement on September 29, 1849; the first passengers on a regularly scheduled run through the village paid fifty cents to travel from Peekskill to Chambers Street in Manhattan on September 29, 1849. By 1853, a ferry ran across the Hudson from Dearman to Piermont on the west bank, the village had a population of around 600, a hotel, six stores, a lumber yard and around 50 houses, and the hamlet of "Abbotsford" – which would later become Ardsley-on-Hudson – was forming along Clinton Avenue.

=== A change of name ===
In 1854, Dearman and Abbotsford combined, and by popular vote adopted the name "Irvington", to honor the American author Washington Irving, who was still alive at that time and living in nearby "Sunnyside" – which is today preserved as a museum. (Note: Although Sunnyside was considered to be part of Irvington (or "Dearman") at the time, the neighboring village of Tarrytown incorporated first in 1870, two years before Irvington, and when the official boundaries were drawn, the estate ended up in Tarrytown rather than Irvington, as did Lyndhurst, the estate of robber baron Jay Gould. Just how the change in our northern boundary occurred I could never find out to my satisfaction. Some say this calamity happened over night, so to speak, when our officials were napping or away on vacation. But this I know, that fully a dozen of our most prominent citizens and their magnificent estates were suddenly taken from Irvington territory and the village boundary was moved to the center of Sunnyside Lane. ... The part that most saddened our hearts was the fact that Irving's home, "Sunnyside", for whom Irvington was named, no longer rests in the town in which he originally thought he lived." Jennie Black (quoted in Graff & Graff, pp.54-56)) Influential residents of the village prevailed upon the Hudson River Railroad, which had reached the village by 1849, to change the name of the train station to "Irvington", and also convinced the Postmaster to change the name of the local post office as well. It was thus under the name of "Irvington" that the village incorporated on April 16, 1872.

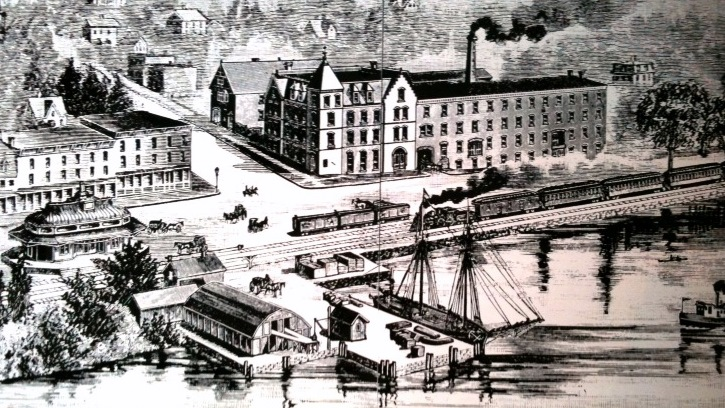
The Irvington waterfront between 1859 and 1889, showing the Lord & Burnham Building on the right

By the census of 1860, the population of the village was 599. A few years later, in 1863, Irvington was touched by the New York Draft Riots. Fearing that the violence in the city, which had to be put down by Federal troops, would spread to Westchester, special police were brought in and quartered in a schoolhouse on Sunnyside Lane. They were commanded by James Hamilton – the third son of Alexander Hamilton – whose estate, Nevis, was on South Broadway. The presence of this special force deterred any violence a group of draft protestors which passed through Greenburgh on their way to Tarrytown may have intended. This was the only instance in which Civil War-related activity directly affected Irvington.

With convenient rail transportation now available, the village's cool summer breezes off the Hudson and the rural riparian setting began to attract wealthy residents of New York City – businessmen, politicians and professionals – to the area to buy up farms and build large summer residences on their new estates, setting a pattern which would hold until the early 20th century. Still, the village continued to expand, with various commercial enterprises opening along the waterfront. Pateman & Lockwood, a lumber, coal and building supply company, opened in the village in 1853, and Lord & Burnham, which built boilers and greenhouses, in 1856. Both expanded to newly created land across the railroad tracks, in 1889 and 1912 respectively, and the Cypress Lumber Company opened on a nearby site in 1909. Notwithstanding this commercial activity, for many years, through the 19th and early 20th centuries, Irvington was a relatively small community (the population was reported as 2,299 in 1890 and 2,013 in 1898), surrounded by numerous large estates and mansions where millionaires, aristocrats and captains of industry lived. During the Gilded Age, the stretch of these estates on both sides of Broadway between Irvington and Briarcliff Manor was known as Millionaires' Row.

After World War I, some of the bigger estates in the area were broken up into smaller lots, and were developed into communities inside the village, such as Jaffray Park, Matthiessen Park and Spiro Park. Many of the estates and mansions are now gone, but a small number still exist. After World War II, cooperative apartment complexes were built in the village, but despite these changes, Irvington still has many large houses, and is still an overwhelmingly well-heeled community.

=== Recent events ===
In June 2016, Irvington Fire Chief Christopher D. DePaoli was one of 23 recipients of the Carnegie Hero Fund Commission medal for heroism. In April 2015, DePaoli stepped in when he saw a woman being attacked by a man with a knife at the Irvington Metro-North Station. DePaoli was able get between the man and the woman, the man's girlfriend, who was on the ground being stabbed, and distract him with a baseball bat until the police arrived. The man was arrested and the woman survived the attack.

Since 2014, Irvington has held a "Celebrate Irvington" festival on the village's Main Street in the early summer.

Irvington's first murder since 1974 took place on April 25, 2018, when a recently hired dishwasher stabbed Bonifacio Rodriguez, a prep cook, in the kitchen of the River City Grille at 6 South Broadway. The accused woman, New York City resident Rosa Ramirez, told police when she was arrested shortly after the incident. that she had suffered a "psychotic break". Ramirez pleaded guilty to second-degree murder, a Class A felony, on February 21, 2020, in return for an expected sentence of 17 years to life, which was made official in September 2020.

In May 2020, a lawsuit was filed against an 18 year old Irvington High School senior, Ellis Pinsky, who was accused with co-conspirators from the US and Europe of swindling digital currency investor Michael Terpin – the founder and chief executive officer of Transform Group – of $23.8 million in 2018, when the accused was 15 years old, through the use of data stolen from smartphones by "SIM swaps". The complaint alleges that Pinsky had a personal worth of $70 million as of December 2017. The lawsuit was filed in federal court in White Plains, New York and asked for triple damages. An investigation by the New York Post revealed that Pinsky lived a lavish lifestyle, driving an Audi R8, maintaining an account with a private air service, purchasing prime tickets to New York Rangers hockey games, and wearing expensive clothing. Pinsky had previously been recognized by the College Board as being an "AP Scholar".

For years, Sarah Cox, a local museum educator, and Kathy Sears, a journalist, led a research project that identified more than a dozen enslaved Africans buried in a previously unknown cemetery in Irvington. The site was found through an in-depth review of historical maps and village archives, including editions of the Irvington Gazette from the 1920s and 1930s. Their work led the village Board of Trustees to officially approve a memorial garden at the site in 2021. Yesterday, a bronze sculpture by artist Vinnie Bagwell depicting a young enslaved African girl, was officially dedicated on June 10, 2023, on the grounds of the Main Street School.

== Geography ==
The village has a total area of 4.0 square miles (10 km^{2}), of which 2.8 square miles (7.3 km^{2}) or about 1,850 acres (750 ha) is land and 1.2 square miles (3.1 km^{2}), or 30.94%, is water.

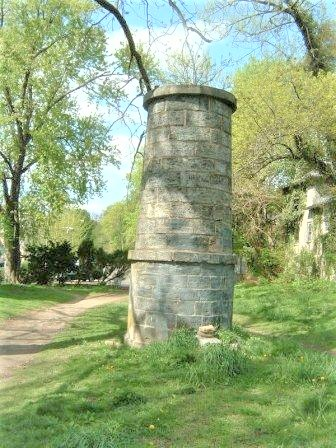
Ventilator #16 on the Old Croton Aqueduct Trailway

The village's main thoroughfare is Broadway (Route 9) originally an Indian footpath which gradually became a horse track and then a dirt road. It came to be called the "King's Highway" around the time that it reached Albany. Later, it was called the "Queen's Highway", after Queen Anne, the "Highland Turnpike" after 1800 – a name still preserved in the nearby town of Ossining – the "Albany Post Road" and, after 1850, "Broadway". The stretch that runs through Irvington was completed by 1723. During his tenure as Postmaster General, Benjamin Franklin had 3-foot-high (0.91 m) sandstone milestone markers placed along the Broadway, inscribed with the distance from New York City. Milestone #27 is still in place in Irvington, near the driveway to 30 South Broadway.

Broadway runs north-south parallel to the river, and connects Irvington to Dobbs Ferry in the south and Tarrytown in the north. All of the village's major streets, including Main Street, extend east and west from Broadway, and are designated as such. Broadway is designated "North Broadway" above Main Street, and "South Broadway" below it. Main Street begins at the Metro-North train station, just off the Hudson River, and travels uphill to Broadway. Side streets off of Main, which were originally designated A Street, B Street, C Street, etc. when the village grid was laid out, now have names, most of which come from local history: Astor, Buckhout, Cottenet, Dutcher, Ecker, Ferris and Grinnell.

The southbound Saw Mill River Parkway can be reached via Harriman Road/Cyrus Field Road, past the village reservoir, or East Sunnyside Lane/Mountain Road through East Irvington. The northbound Saw Mill and the New York State Thruway are accessible via Ardsley, and the Mario Cuomo Bridge is nearby in Tarrytown.

Commuter train service to New York City is available at the Irvington and Ardsley-on-Hudson train stations, served by the Metro-North Railroad of the MTA. Bus service is provided on Broadway by the Westchester County Beeline Bus System via route #1T (The Bronx-Yonkers-Tarrytown) and #1W (The Bronx-Yonkers-White Plains).

As with all river communities in Westchester, Irvington is traversed by a stretch of the old Croton Aqueduct, about 3 miles (4.8 km) long, which is now part of the Old Croton Trailway State Park. The Aqueduct is a National Historic Landmark.

== Demographics ==
Historical population
Census	Pop.	Note	%±
1880	1,904		—
1890	2,299		20.7%
1900	2,231		−3.0%
1910	2,319		3.9%
1920	2,701		16.5%
1930	3,067		13.6%
1940	3,272		6.7%
1950	3,657		11.8%
1960	5,494		50.2%
1970	5,878		7.0%
1980	5,774		−1.8%
1990	6,348		9.9%
2000	6,631		4.5%
2010	6,420		−3.2%
2020	6,652		3.6%
U.S. Decennial Census

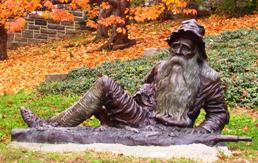
Life-size bronze of Rip Van Winkle sculpted by Richard Masloski © 2000

=== 2020 census ===
As of the 2020 census, Irvington had a population of 6,652. The population density was 2,384.23 inhabitants per square mile (920.56/km^{2}). The median age was 44.4 years. 24.2% of residents were under the age of 18 and 17.7% of residents were 65 years of age or older. For every 100 females there were 91.3 males, and for every 100 females age 18 and over there were 86.8 males age 18 and over.

100.0% of residents lived in urban areas, while 0.0% lived in rural areas.

There were 2,588 households in Irvington, of which 36.5% had children under the age of 18 living in them. Of all households, 59.0% were married-couple households, 12.1% were households with a male householder and no spouse or partner present, and 25.2% were households with a female householder and no spouse or partner present. About 24.8% of all households were made up of individuals and 11.3% had someone living alone who was 65 years of age or older. The average household size was 2.60 and the average family size was 3.13.

There were 2,734 housing units, of which 5.3% were vacant. The homeowner vacancy rate was 1.8% and the rental vacancy rate was 7.9%.

Racial composition as of the 2020 census
Race	Number	Percent
White	5,252	79.0%
Black or African American	108	1.6%
American Indian and Alaska Native	12	0.2%
Asian	606	9.1%
Native Hawaiian and Other Pacific Islander	0	0.0%
Some other race	158	2.4%
Two or more races	516	7.8%
Hispanic or Latino (of any race)	475	7.1%

=== Income and poverty ===
The median income for a household in the village was $145,313. Males had a median income of $85,708 versus $50,714 for females. The per capita income for the village was $74,319. About 7.1% of the population were below the poverty line. The average cost for a one-family house in 2010 was $585,780, below the Westchester County average of $725,000, although in 2009 the median home price was reported to be $790,000. Bloomberg ranked Irvington 54th in its March 2017 profile of "America's 100 Richest Places". In the 2018 survey, it ranked 67th of the over 6,200 places covered.

=== Housing ===
As of 2018, there were approximately 1,180 single-family homes in the village, as well as 100 multi-family homes. Although Irvington primarily consists of single family homes, there are eight condominium complexes, 13 cooperative ones and 17 apartment buildings, totally almost 1,100 units altogether. Cooperative or condominium apartment complexes in the village include in the Fieldpoint development, Woodbrook Gardens located at 140 North Broadway, and Irvington Gardens at 120 North Broadway, as well as in the Half Moon development on South Buckhout Street.

In 1999, the village began a program to make affordable housing available to the public. Two buildings, The Burnham Building at 2 Main Street, and Hudson Views at Irvington at 1 South Astor Street, provide such units. As of February 2012, the village had passed a local ordinance requiring new developments to provide affordable housing.

The cost of housing in Irvington was pushed upwards by Greenburgh's town-wide re-evaluation of property values, which was initiated in 2016.

== Economy ==
Although Irvington is still an affluent suburban "bedroom community", with a large number of people commuting into New York City to work, there are also several notable businesses and institutions located in the village, such as:

- BrightFarms, a company that grows salad greens, is headquartered in Irvington.
- Verve Medical Cosmetics – In January 2021 this company announced that it will open Verve Loft Westchester in a left space on Bridge Street. It is expected to open on February 4.
- CastleGreen Finance, a private capital source focused on commercial PACE (Property Assessed Clean Energy) financing, is headquartered in Irvington.
- Columbia University's Nevis Laboratories is a research center specializing in the preparation, design, and construction of high-energy particle and nuclear experiments and equipment which are transported to accelerators such as Fermilab, CERN and Brookhaven National Laboratory. The resulting data is analyzed at Nevis using their extensive computer systems. Twelve faculty members, fourteen postdoctoral research scientists and twenty graduate students work at the lab, along with an engineering and technical staff of twenty. The grounds also accommodate an agricultural research center. "Nevis" was the estate of Alexander Hamilton's son, and was named after Hamilton's birthplace, the Caribbean island of Nevis.
- Eileen Fisher, a clothing design company, has corporate offices and of a retail shop at Bridge Street Properties by the Hudson. In addition, in 2017, it opened in Irvington its first company-owned factory.
- The investment company Elm Ridge Management is based in Irvington.
- Flat World Knowledge is an online publisher of college-level open textbooks.
- House Party, Inc., an experimental marketing firm which specializes in arranging parties to promote their clients' products, has its offices at 50 South Buckhout Street.
- Hudson Loft – In August 2016 it was announced that a 9,000-square-foot (840 m^{2}) event space on the top floor of a three=story warehouse at 2 Astor Place in Irvington would be available beginning at the end of September for weddings, parties and other events. The space features panoramic views of the Hudson River and a 6,000-square-foot main space.
- The direct marketing agency Lockard & Wechsler is located in Bridge Street Properties.
- Monte Nido Treatment Center, a residential treatment center for eating disorders, was announced in May 2014 to be planned for Irvington. It would be located in a 10,000-square-foot, 20-room mansion at 100 South Broadway near Clinton Avenue. The organization has residential facilities in Malibu and Agoura Hills in California and in Boston, as well as a day-clinic in New York City.
- Natural Market Food Group, the parent company of the "Mrs. Green's Natural Market" supermarket chain, which operates primarily in the Hudson Valley area, has its offices in Irvington.
- PECO Pallet, a pooled pallet provider headquartered in Irvington
- Strata Skin Sciences, formerly MELA Sciences, is a medical device company that focuses on the design and development of a non-invasive, point-of-care instruments to assist in the early diagnosis of melanoma. In 2015, the company acquired XTRAC and PhotoMedex.
- The Student Center, a community website for teenagers and college students, has offices on Main Street.
- X-Caliber Capital, a national, direct commercial real estate lender.

== Government and politics ==
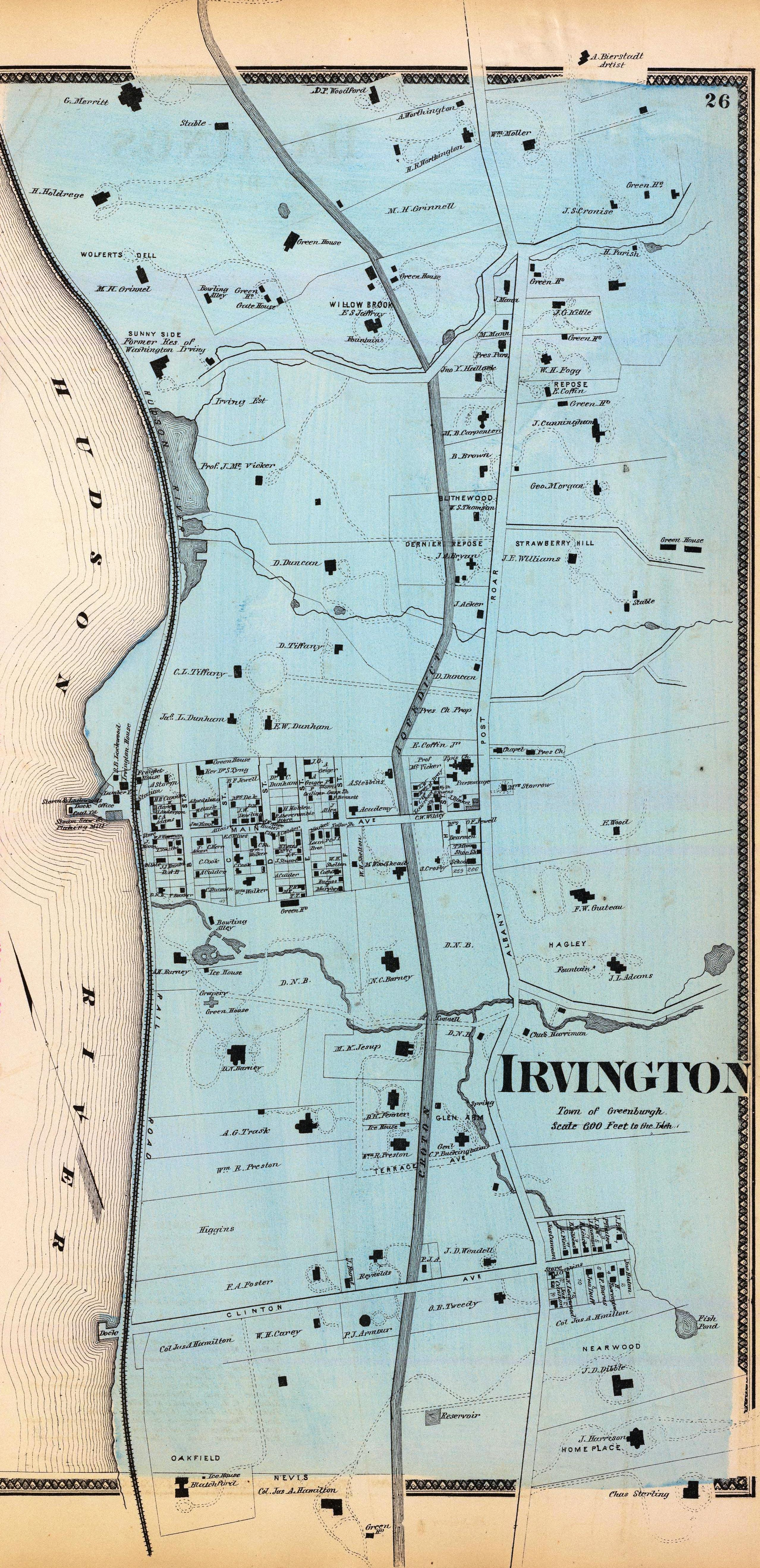
The Irvington section of an 1868 map of Hastings, Dobbs Ferry and Irvington, with the village surrounded by the large estates and summer homes of the rich. Note that Main Street is called "Main Avenue". Expand this map / Full map

Irvington is one of six incorporated villages that lie within the town of Greenburgh. The village is governed by a mayor, who is elected every two years in odd-numbered years, and four trustees, who also serve two-year terms. Two of the trustees are elected in odd-numbered years, with the mayor and the other two in even-numbered years. Each year, the mayor appoints one of the trustees to be deputy mayor. A paid village administrator is responsible for the day-to-day operations of the village, assisted by a clerk-treasurer. The administration is divided into eleven departments:

- Administrator
- Building
- Clerk-Treasurer
- Fire
- Justice Court
- Library
- Parks and Recreation
- Police
- Public Works
- Town Hall Theater
- Water and Sewer

In addition, the mayor and board of trustees are assisted in the governance of the village by a number of voluntary boards and committees:

- Architectural Review Board
- Beautification Committee
- Cable Advisory Board
- Citizens' Budget Committee
- Climate Protection Task Force
- Community Advisory Board
- Environmental Conservation Board
- Ethics Board
- Library Board
- Main Street Zoning Committee
- Open Space Advisory Committee
- Parks and Recreation Master Plan Committee
- Planning Board
- Recreation Advisory Committee
- Theater Commission
- Trailways Committee
- Transportation Committee
- Tree Preservation Commission
- War Monument Committee
- Zoning Board of Appeals

Irvington is protected by its own 22-person police department, along with a volunteer fire department and volunteer ambulance corps, all of which are located on Main Street. Irvington's government communicates with the village's citizens through a newsletter, e-mail notifications and the village website.

=== 2005 mayoral election ===
The controversial 2005 Irvington mayoral election was held on March 15, 2005, but was not decided until October 27, 2005. The race between Republican incumbent Dennis P. Flood and Democratic challenger Erin Malloy ended up being decided "by lots", as required by New York state law when a village election is tied (847 votes for each candidate).

The count that took place on election night gave Flood a one-vote lead. On March 18, the Westchester County Board of Elections recounted the votes, giving Malloy a one-vote lead. Turning to two unopened absentee ballots, the board found that one was for Flood, resulting in a tie. The other absentee ballot was not opened as the name on the envelope did not match any names on the voter-registration list. Susan B. Morton, who had registered to vote as Susan Brenner Morton, stepped forward three days later and demanded that her vote for Malloy be counted. For several months afterward, various suits, motions, and appeals were filed in state courts. On October 20, the Court of Appeals, New York State's highest court, denied requests by Malloy and Morton, leaving the election in a tie. To comply with state law, the village had to use random lots to decide the winner.

State law does not specify the method of drawing lots, so the village opted to draw quarters from a bag. Eight quarters were used. Four had a bald eagle on the back and represented Malloy. Flood was represented by four quarters with the Statue of Liberty on the back. Village Trustee/Deputy Mayor Richard Livingston, a Republican, drew a quarter from the bag. It was handed to Village Clerk Lawrence Schopfer, who declared Flood to be the winner. Flood was then sworn in for his sixth two-year term as mayor of Irvington.

Months later, to complicate the situation even more, it was learned that an Irvington resident who has two houses and was registered to vote in both Irvington and a Long Island suburb, inadvertently broke the law by voting in both elections, although his intent was to cancel his Irvington voter registration. He was an adamant supporter of Flood.

Erin Malloy was elected mayor in the election of 2007, but resigned in 2008 to spend more time with her injured daughter.

=== Infrastructure ===
Irvington is one of 83 communities in New York State which are being considered by the New York State Energy and Research Development Authority (ERDA) for the installation of a microgrid system, which would run under Main Street. The village's power lines would be moved underground and solar and natural gas generators would be utilized to make it 80% power self-sufficient. In the initial phase, the board of trustees is in discussion with a possible technology provider. There are no current community microgrids in New York.

On March 4, 2021, Irvington received from the New York State Department of Environmental Conservation (DEC) bronze-level certification as being a "Climate Smart Community", one of 65 such in the state. The certification was based on 17 actions taken by the village, including its Comprehensive Plan, last updated in 2018, an energy audit for the Town Hall, the village's flood mitigation program, the conversion of 81.5 percent of the villages streetlight to LEDs, and the establishment of a drop-off food waste program. The Climate Smart program, which began in 2009, is designed to provide technical support and guidance to the efforts of communities to deal with the effects of climate change, by, for instance, reducing greenhouse gas emissions and improving their response to extreme weather. The village also participates in the ERDA's "Clean Energy Communities" program, and has previously received grants from the DEC for flood mitigation and as part of its Municipal Zero-Emission Vehicle program.

== Education ==
=== Primary and secondary schools ===
Irvington Union Free School District
The majority of Irvington is part of the Irvington Union Free School District, which also includes East Irvington, an unincorporated area of the Town of Greenburgh, and the Pennybridge section of Tarrytown, Irvington's northern neighbor. The schools are Dows Lane School (K-3), Main Street School (4&5), Irvington Middle School (6–8), and Irvington High School (9–12). The Middle School and High School are sited together on a combined campus on Heritage Hill Road off of North Broadway, on the site where the Stern castle, "Greystone", once stood. Stern purchased the property from Augustus C. Richards in the late nineteenth century.

Small portions of Irvington extend into the Dobbs Ferry Union Free School District, the Ardsley Union Free School District, and the Elmsford Union Free School District.

Abbott School
Located in Irvington, but not part of the regular public school district, was the Abbott School, which served homeless, neglected, abused, or developmentally disabled boys in grades 2 through 9. The students came both from the residential Abbott House, where the school was located, and as day students from community schools in Westchester County, Rockland County, and New York City. The school graduated its last class in 2011. Currently, Abbott House operates a number of programs to support children and families with challenging circumstances. Abbot House's administrative offices remain in the former school building in Irvington.

Immaculate Conception School
The Immaculate Conception School, a Catholic elementary school located in Irvington, was closed by the Archdiocese of New York in June 2008, after 100 years of existence. In the 2009–2010 school year, John Cardinal O'Connor School, a Catholic non-denominational school for students in grades 2 through 8 with learning disabilities, which had formerly been St. Ursula's Learning Center in Mount Kisco, moved into the vacant building.

=== Colleges ===
There are no colleges totally within Irvington, although part of the campus of Mercy University, founded in 1950, is located there, while the majority is just over the southern border in Dobbs Ferry, very close to Irvington's Ardsley-on-Hudson train station, which is sub-labelled "Mercy College".

In 1890, schoolteacher Mary F. Bennett founded the Bennett School for Girls in the village. The school offered a six-year course of study: four years of high school and two of higher study. In 1907 it moved to Millbrook in Dutchess County, and dropped the high school grades, becoming a junior college; the school was renamed to Bennett College. In that same year, Marymount College was founded in Tarrytown, north of the village. It later became a campus of Fordham University, but closed in 2007.

Columbia University maintains in Irvington its Nevis Laboratories – which specializes in the preparation, design, and construction of high-energy particle and nuclear experiments and equipment, which are transported to major laboratories worldwide, and also houses the Radiological Research Accelerator Facility which specializes in microbeam technology. The grounds also hold an agricultural research center and the offices of Columbia University Press.

== Culture ==
In 2018 Brooke Lea Foster of The New York Times stated that Irvington was one of several "Rivertowns" in Westchester County, which she described as among the "least suburban of suburbs, each one celebrated by buyers there for its culture and hip factor, as much as the housing stock and sophisticated post-city life." Of those, Foster stated that Irvington was the "toniest".

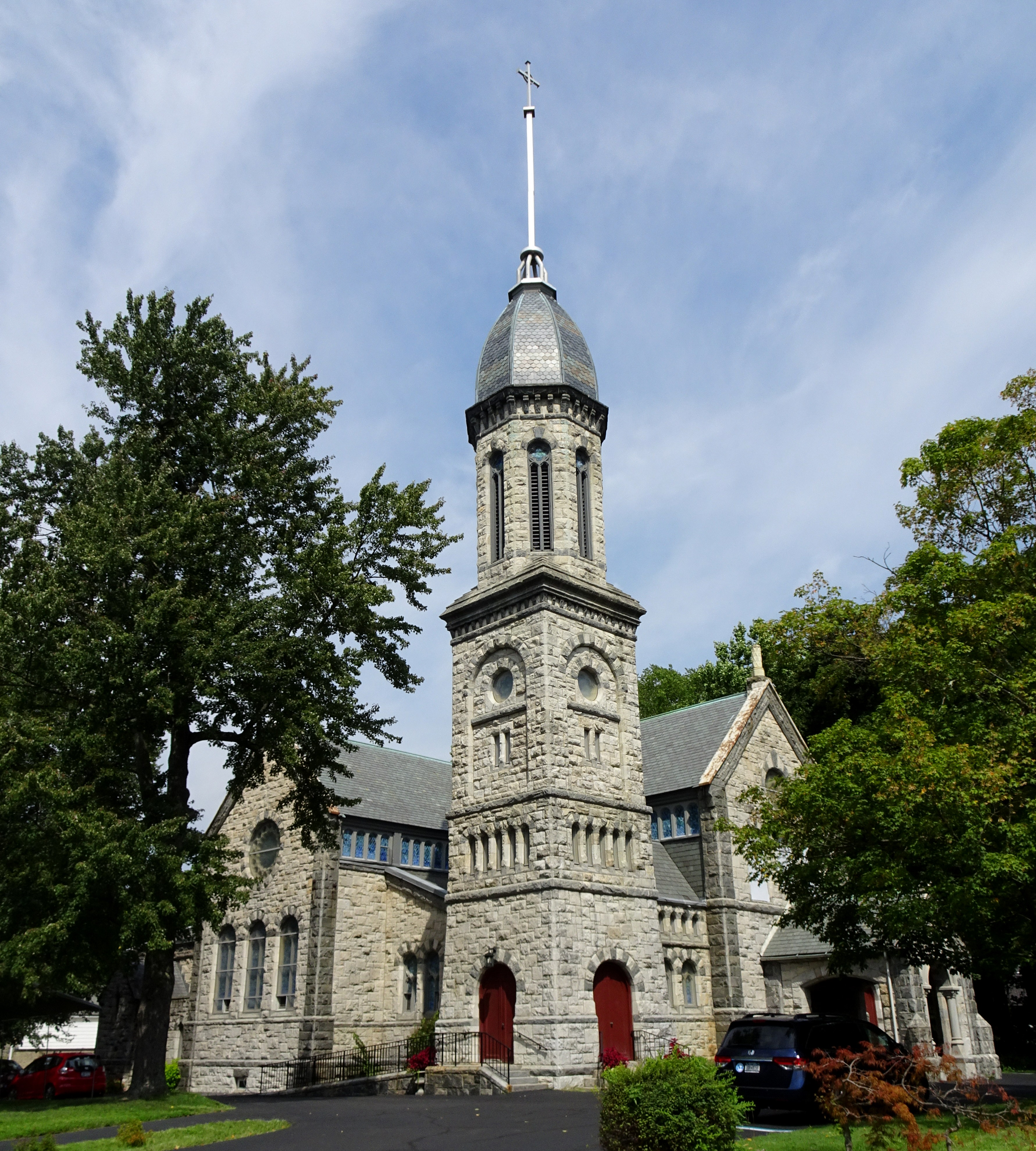
The village's Presbyterian Church

The Town Hall Theater, opened in 1902 and restored in 1979-80, is located in the village's "Town Hall". It was designed to be a replica of Ford's Theatre in Washington, and was widely thought to be one of the best "opera houses" in the Hudson Valley. It was used for public events such as school graduation ceremonies, police and fire balls, plays and other cultural events. Today, the Town Hall Theater presents a wide variety of events, including concerts, plays, musicals and film series. (For more, see below.)

In 2021, a lifelong resident of Irvington, Kamran Saliani, founded the Irvington Shakespeare Company and signed into an Arts Partnership with the Irvington Theater. In 2023, the organization evolved into Rivertowns Playhouse, establishing itself as the permanent secular resident theater company at the Irvington Presbyterian Church.

=== Religion ===
Irvington has four Christian churches. Three of them, the Irvington Presbyterian Church (Presbyterian), the Immaculate Conception Church (Roman Catholic) and The Church of St. Barnabas (Episcopal), are clustered together on Broadway, just north of Main Street. The Calvary Chapel of Westchester (Evangelical) is located in the Trent Building on South Buckhout Street.

The Jewish community of Irvington is served by three nearby synagogues: the traditional/non-denominational Chabad of the Rivertowns, the conservative Greenburgh Hebrew Center in Dobbs Ferry and the dual reform/conservative synagogue Temple Beth Abraham in Tarrytown. Irvington itself features a "chavurah", or member-led Jewish congregation that follows in the conservative tradition, known as Rosh Pinah Chavurah of the Rivertowns.

Irvington is also the location of the Westchester Buddhist Center, whose executive director is interior designer Stacy T. Curchak.

Irvington is home to a number of members of the Unification Church, including several high-ranking families. There are several Church-owned estates and buildings located in Irvington and in the neighboring village of Tarrytown. Reverend Sun Myung Moon, the founder and, until his death in 2010, the spiritual leader of the church, had a large private estate of 17.67 acres (7.15 ha), the former Frederic Clark Sayles estate, on East Sunnyside Lane. As of 2012, the estate was still owned by the church, under its legal name "Holy Spirit Association for the Unification of World Christianity".

== Local media ==
From 1912 to 1998, Irvington's daily newspaper was the Tarrytown Daily News. In 1998, the Gannett Company, the last owner of the newspaper, combined all their area local papers, including the Daily News, into The Journal News, which serves Westchester, Rockland and Putnam counties, an area also referred to as the Lower Hudson Valley.

From 1907 to 1969, the village was also served by The Irvington Gazette, a weekly newspaper which was published on Aqueduct Street "in the interest of the village of Irvington and vicinity". From 1975 to the present, the Rivertowns Enterprise, a weekly newspaper, has reported on local government, schools, sports, arts and business in Irvington as well as Ardsley, Dobbs Ferry, and Hastings-on-Hudson. Additionally, the Hudson Independent, a monthly free newspaper begun in 2006, serves Irvington, Sleepy Hollow, and Tarrytown, an area also covered online by the River Journal, the Rivertowns Dispatch, and Rivertowns Patch.

== Historic Irvington ==
=== Landmark protection ===
Irvington is home to a number of historic landmarks and an historic district. In 2018, the village board of trustees passed local legislation which sought "the protection and enhancement" of landmarks and historic sites. The law will be enforced by an architectural review board which will designate "sites, structures, buildings, markers and objects" that "cannot be duplicated or otherwise replaced" and that are "illustrative of the growth and development of our nation, our state and our Village and that are of particular historic or aesthetic value to Irvington." A village master plan promulgated in 2003 recognized around 200 homes dating from 1859 to 1930 which were worthy of consideration.

=== Points of interest ===
- Ardsley-on-Hudson Station House – The station house on the northbound side, which houses the waiting room and the Ardsley-on-Hudson post office, is all that is left of the McKim, Mead & White-designed Tudor style buildings associated with the Ardsley Casino which was located there. The casino, established with the support of Jay Gould, Cornelius Vanderbilt, J. Pierpont Morgan, William Rockefeller, and Amzi Lorenzo Barber, had a golf course, tennis courts, stables, a private dock of the New York Yacht Club, and daily stagecoach service to the Hotel Brunswick on Fifth Avenue in Manhattan. The casino was torn down in 1936 and was replaced by the Hudson House apartment building, designed by Shreve, Lamb and Harmon, which still stands. The station was used as a location for the 2016 film The Girl on the Train, with the addition of a portico to recreate the feel of the station as it existed in 1890. (110 West Ardsley Avenue)
- Armour-Stiner House (also known as the Carmer Octagon House) (1860) – Built by financier Paul J. Armour according to the ideas of Orson Fowler, the house originally had only two stories and a flat roof. Expanded – adding the dome and the veranda, as well as elaborate deocartions and embellishments – and refurbished by Joseph Stiner in 1872, the Armour-Stiner House is said to be one of the most lavish octagon houses built in the period, and is now one of only perhaps a hundred still extant. The house was later occupied by historian Carl Carmer, who maintained that it was haunted. In 1976, the house was briefly owned by the National Trust for Historic Preservation to prevent it from being demolished. The trust was unable to fund the amount of renovation the property required, and sold it to a preservationist architect, Joseph Pell Lombardi, who has conserved the house, interiors, grounds and outbuildings. The house is a National Historic Landmark. (West Clinton Avenue, west of the Old Croton Trail)
- Churches:
  - Church of St. Barnabas (1853) – A stone Gothic building listed on the National Register of Historic Places (2000), the cornerstone of St. Barnabas was laid on May 29, 1853. It was originally intended as a chapel and school, and was designed by the Reverend Dr. John McVickar, a professor at Columbia College and the General Theological Seminary and friend of Washington Irving – his son, William McVickar, was the church's first rector. The building was constructed from stone quarried on the former Rutter estate across Broadway, where the "Fieldpoint" development is now located. In the early 1860s the building was enlarged to become a parish church, to plans produced by the firm of Renwick and Sands. (James Renwick Jr. was the architect who would design the Irvington Presbyterian Church which stands next to St. Barnabas.) The "Lich Gate" entryway dates from circa 1896, and was designed by A. J. Manning, who later designed the Irvington Town Hall. The gate is made of solid oak on a stone foundation, and was a memorial to Mrs. H. B. Worthington. (North Broadway, north of Main Street)
  - Irvington Presbyterian Church (1869) – A Romanesque church designed by James Renwick Jr., who also designed St. Patrick's Cathedral, New York; the stained-glass windows were designed by Louis Comfort Tiffany, who had once been an Irvington resident. The cost of construction was $53,0000. (North Broadway, north of Main Street)
- Cosmopolitan Building (1895) – This three-story stone neo-Classical revival building topped by three small domes was designed by Stanford White as the headquarters for Cosmopolitan when the magazine moved from New York to Irvington. John Brisben Walker, who had bought the general interest magazine in 1889, had a mansion in Irvington only a short walk away. In 1897 Walker started a free correspondence school, the Cosmopolitan Educational University Extension. When 20,000 people enrolled, Walker was unable to keep to its offer of a no-cost education for all, and had to ask the students to pay $20 per year. Nevertheless, the venture attracted well-known academics to its staff, and public lectures and other events associated with the school were held in the headquarters building. The magazine also sponsored several automobile races from New York to Irvington to promote the automobile. Cosmopolitan left Irvington shortly after William Randolph Hearst bought the magazine in 1905 and moved it back to New York. Afterwards, the building was used as a silent movie studio for some period of time, but for most of its subsequent history has primarily housed manufacturing concerns of various types, including one that made radio oscillators used by the U.S. Army in World War II, and a company that made looseleaf binders and other paper products.
  The Cosmopolitan Building still stands, although it is known as the "Trent Building" after the family that owns it, but it is quite run down, and its visage has suffered from the pedestrian brick industrial building which was stuck onto its rear, obscuring the eastern facade. The building houses manufacturers, offices, a video production facility, a publisher of art books, interior design firms, a yoga studio, a chapel, photographers, a spa, a florist and event space and at least one restaurant. (50 South Buckhout Street)
- East Irvington Public School (1898, 1925) – Built in 1891 as a one-story schoolhouse for the community of East Irvington, the building was expanded to two stories in 1925, and accommodated all elementary school children in the area. In 1954, because of overcrowding, the village built the Dows Lane Elementary School, although the East Irvington School continued to be used for some grades until 1970, when it was closed. East Irvington, an unincorporated area of the town of Greenburgh which is part of the Irvington School District, but not of the Village of Irvington, had been known as "Dublin" due to the number of Irish immigrant workers living there, many of whom worked at the nearby quarry. The school building was converted to condominiums in 1983, when it was also placed on the National Register of Historic Places. A similar school is located in the section of Tarrytown known as "Pennybridge", which is also part of the Irvington School District.
- Halsey Teahouse (1905) – A. J. Manning was commissioned by oil and cotton magnate Melchior S. Beltzhoover to build an exact replica of a Rhineland castle. The 44-room mansion, called "Rochroane", was sold to Benjamin Halsey in 1927 and renamed "Grey Towers". The estate was given by Halsey's widow to the Irvington Catholic Church in 1976, and the castle burned down the next year (the exterior was stone, but the interior was wood). The estate was sold to a developer, who gave the pond to the village in exchange for the right to build residence on the property. The "Halsey Playhouse" or "Teahouse", which was restored in 1997, is the last remnant of the estate, except for a Tiffany landscape window now in the Corning Museum of Glass. The Teahouse has two floors, and an open hexagonal tower with Gothic-arched windows, and there is a walkway and stone bridge around Halsey Pond, which the structure overlooks. Vestiges of a fountain, dam, and other structures can be seen in the nearby woods and backyards.
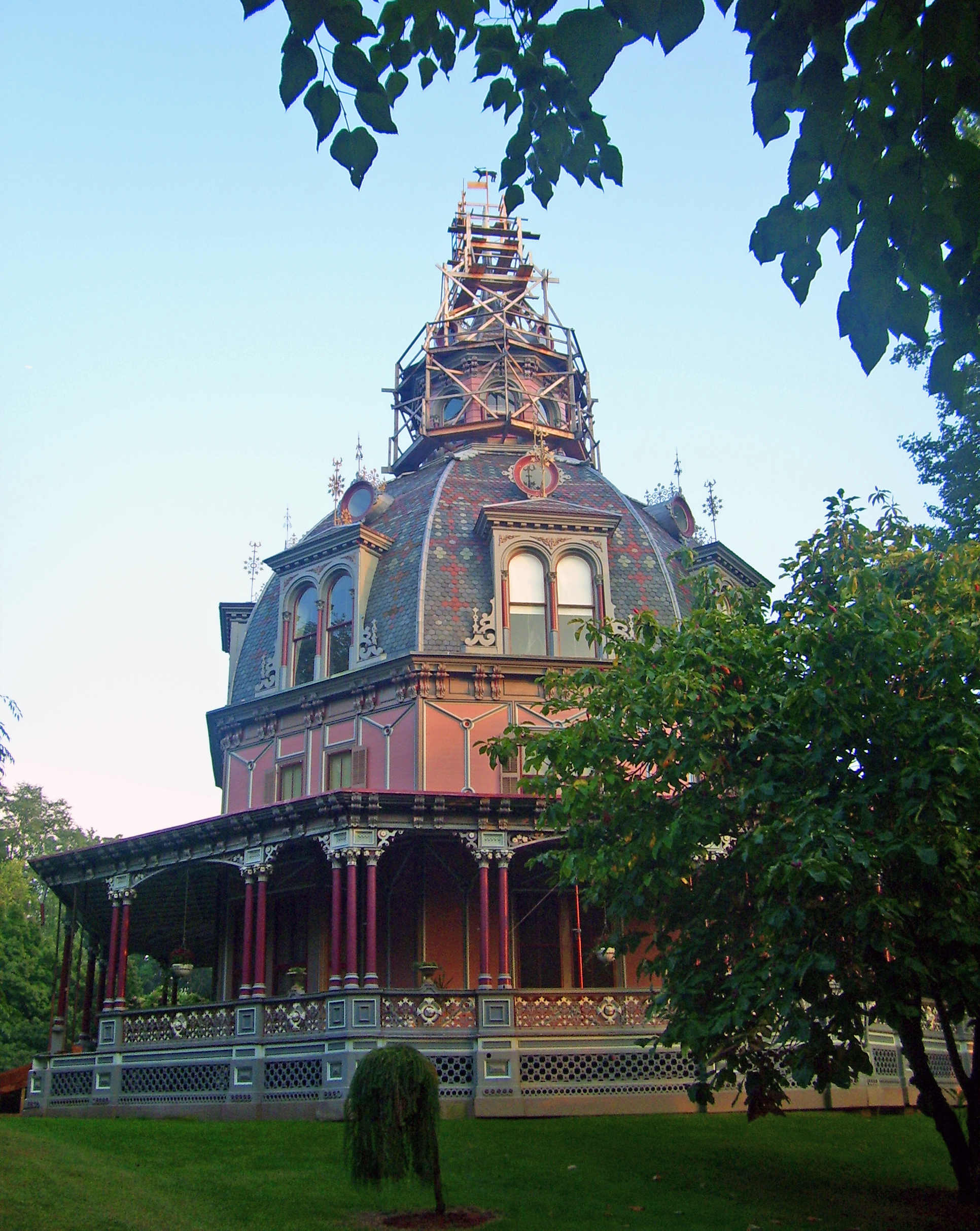
Armour-Stiner Octagon House, a National Historic Landmark

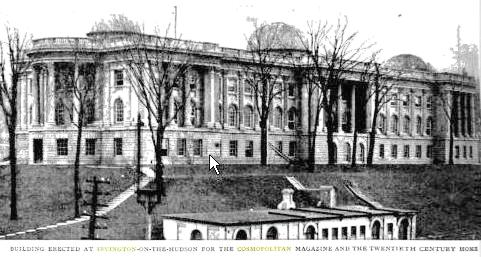
The Cosmopolitan Building, from an advertisement for Cosmopolitan magazine, c.1900

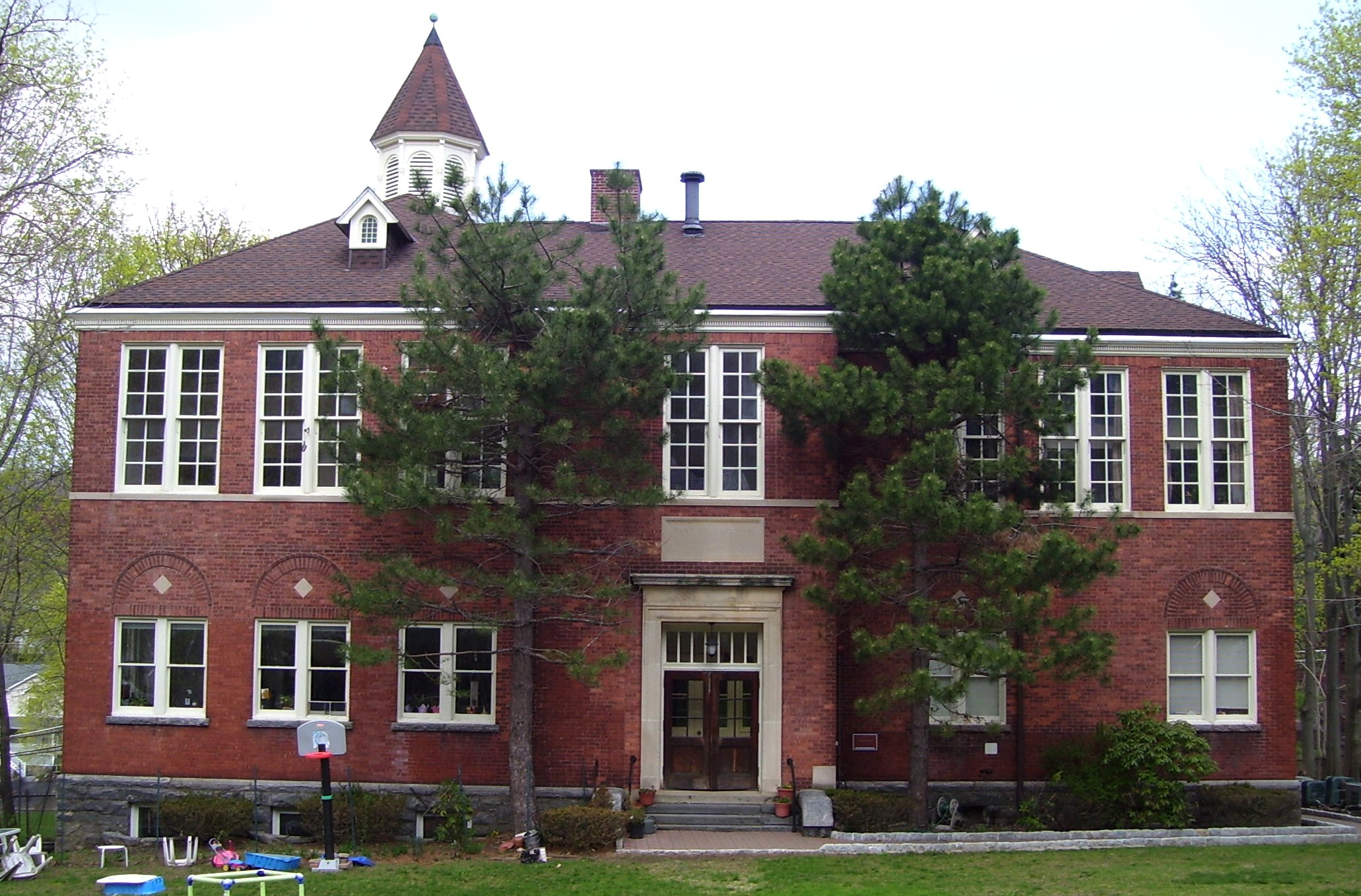
East Irvington Public School building, now condominiums

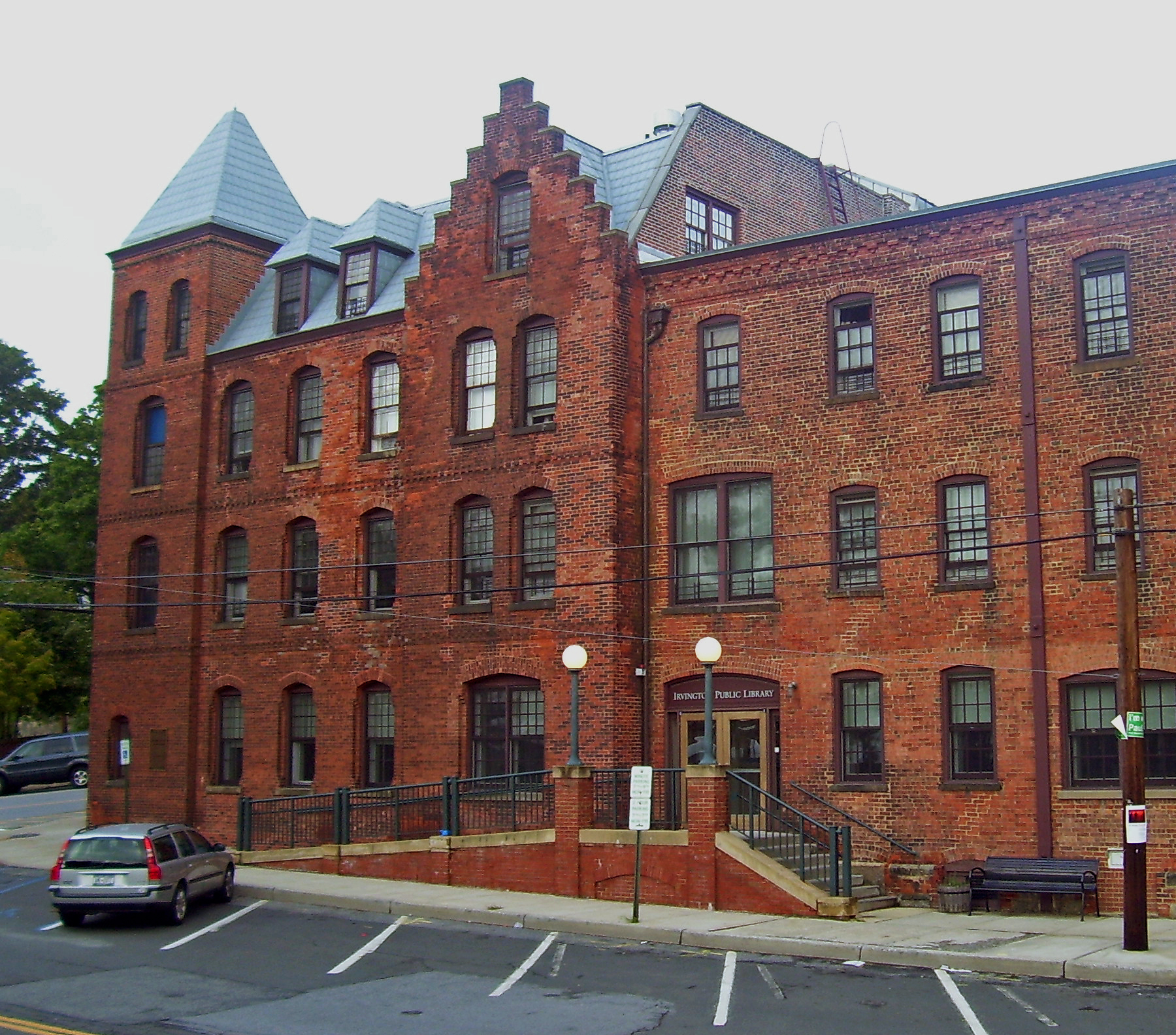
Lord & Burnham Building
- Hermit's Grave (1888) – Johann W. Stolting was a native of Heligoland who lived deep in the woods of Irvington as a hermit in the 19th century. He slept in his coffin, made of local chestnut wood, in a cabin overlooking the Saw Mill River valley. Stolting made his own clothes, wore sandals for shoes, but never wore a hat. He survived by selling wooden buttons made on a homemade foot-powered lathe. He died in 1888 at the age of 78, and his grave is only a few hundred feet west of the Saw Mill Parkway – the only marked grave in Irvington. The grave is reachable by a marked trail (the blue and white blazed "HG" trail) that begins at the north end of the village reservoir. (trail head at Fieldpoint Road)
- Hillside (1889) – Built in 1889 for medical doctor Carroll Dunham, the Colonial Revival mansion house was designed for 34 rooms with 16 fireplaces, gables and bay windows, a large staircase, walls of mahogany paneling, and glass designed by Irvington resident Louis Comfort Tiffany. The grounds were designed by Charles Eliot, who also planned the Boston park system with later alterations by Frederick Law Olmsted, the co-creator of New York City's Central Park. The estate was sold shortly after Dunham's death in 1923 to Gordon Harris, the son of American Tobacco Company founder William R. Harris. Gordon Harris, then Vice President of the United States Lines shipping company, and his family lived on the estate until 1946
- Irvington Historic District (2013-14). In December 2002, a committee prepared for the trustees of the village of Irvington a comprehensive request for the New York State Department of Parks, Recreation of Historic Preservation to create a State and Federal historic district to include the heart of the village:
  that area of Irvington bounded by the Hudson River to the West, and Broadway to the East (to include Saint Barnabas and the Presbyterian Churches), by the gates of Barney Park to the South, and by the gates of Matthiessen Park to the North. This boundary being consistent with the original 1850s layout of Dearman, later renamed Irvington-on-Hudson.
  This proposal did not result in an historic district being created. In 2011, a second attempt was made, with a Historic District Committee being created and another application being made, this time covering
  Portions of Main St., W. Main St., River St., Bridge St., N. and S. Astor St., N. and S. Buckhout St., N. and S. Cottenet St., N. and S. Dutcher St., N. and S. Eckar St., N. and S. Ferris St., E. and W. Home Pl., Grinnel St., Aqueduct Ln., N. and S. Dearman St., and Broadway
  In September 2013, the proposal was accepted by the state, and in January 2014 by the National Register for Historic Places. The district includes 212 contributing and 43 non-contributing buildings, and 1 contributing site.
- Lord & Burnham Building (1881) – Lord & Burnham manufactured greenhouses – an excellent example of which can be seen at Lyndhurst, the estate of Jay Gould, in neighboring Tarrytown – and boilers. The Burnham factory building, built in 1881 to replace a factory that burned down on the same site that year, is listed on the National Register of Historic Places since 1999. It has been renovated and repurposed into residences and the new home of the expanded Irvington Public Library. Across the railroad tracks, the buildings of Lord & Burnham's expansion factory have been renovated and transformed into upscale commercial real estate buildings known as Bridge Street Properties, which houses around 60 different companies, retail stores, and restaurants. (Foot of Main Street at the train station). Additionally, residential row houses originally constructed for Lord & Burnham's factory workers can be found at #10-#16A North Buckhout Street, north of Main Street.
- McVickar House (1853) – The McVickar House was built by Reverend John McVickar for his son, the Reverend William McVickar, the first rector of St. Barnabas Church. John McVickar's own house was on Fargo Lane, not far from Sunnyside, and it is said that Washington Irving enjoyed the view from John McVickar's house better than the one from his own. The backyard of the William McVickar house became the site of a Con Edison substation in 1957, and served as a doctor's office until 1984. The Village of Irvington acquired it in 2002, and it was restored and renovated to be the headquarters of the Irvington Historical Society, opening in November 2005 as the Irvington History Center. The building is on the National Register of Historic Places (2003). (131 Main Street, between North Dearman and Broadway)
- Nevis (1836) – Columbia University's Nevis Laboratories is located on a 60-acre (24 ha) property originally owned by James Alexander Hamilton, the third son of Alexander Hamilton. He called the estate, which was originally 124 acres (50 ha), "Nevis" after the Caribbean island which was the birthplace of the elder Hamilton. The Greek revival mansion James Hamilton built in 1836 is still standing on the grounds. Over the years, the 154-acre (62-hectare) estate was reduced to 68 acres (28 hectares). It was purchased by Mrs. T. Coleman DuPont of Delaware in 1920, and was given to Columbia by her in 1934, "to make more satisfactory provision for its increasingly important work in landscape architecture and general horticulture." One early pamphlet remarked, "Nevis is one of the superb examples of historic and landscape architecture in America. No other country place north of Maryland so perfectly exemplifies the taste of the Early Republican Period in our history." The property contains an inventory of 2,640 trees and 1,928 ornamental shrubs. Columbia began the construction of a physics laboratory with a cyclotron – at the time the world's most powerful – in 1947, which was dedicated by Columbia's president, Dwight D. Eisenhower, in 1950. It was decommissioned in 1978. The laboratory continues to be used to study high-energy physics and astrophysics. (South Broadway)
- Nuits (1853) – This Italianate villa was built as a summer home by the textile importer Francis Cottenet (who came from Nuits-St.-George in France, and whose name adorns "Cottenet Street" in Irvington) out of brick faced with Caen stone – a light creamy-yellow limestone quarried in northwestern France near the city of Caen, and brought to America as ballast in Cottenet's ships – to a design by the noted German architect Detlef Lienau. The house was built in two stages, the south entrance area first in 1853, and the north extension, which features a Lord and Burnham conservatory, in 1860. The house passed through numerous owners, including Cyrus Field, John Jacob Astor III and Amzi Lorenzo Barber. Nuits remains a private residence, albeit on 4.78 acres (1.93 ha) rather than the original 40-acre (16 ha) estate. Nuits, which is also known as the Cottenet-Brown House, was added to the National Register of Historic Places in 1977, and the house was restored between 1980 and 2000. (2 Clifton Place at Hudson Road, Ardsley-on-Hudson)
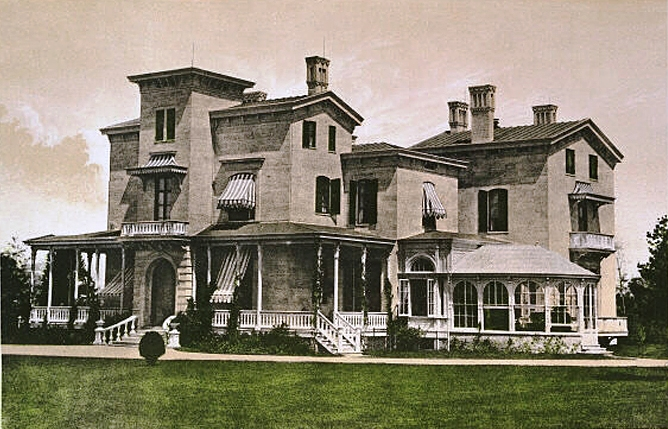
"Nuits", the residence of Francis Cottenet, c.1860

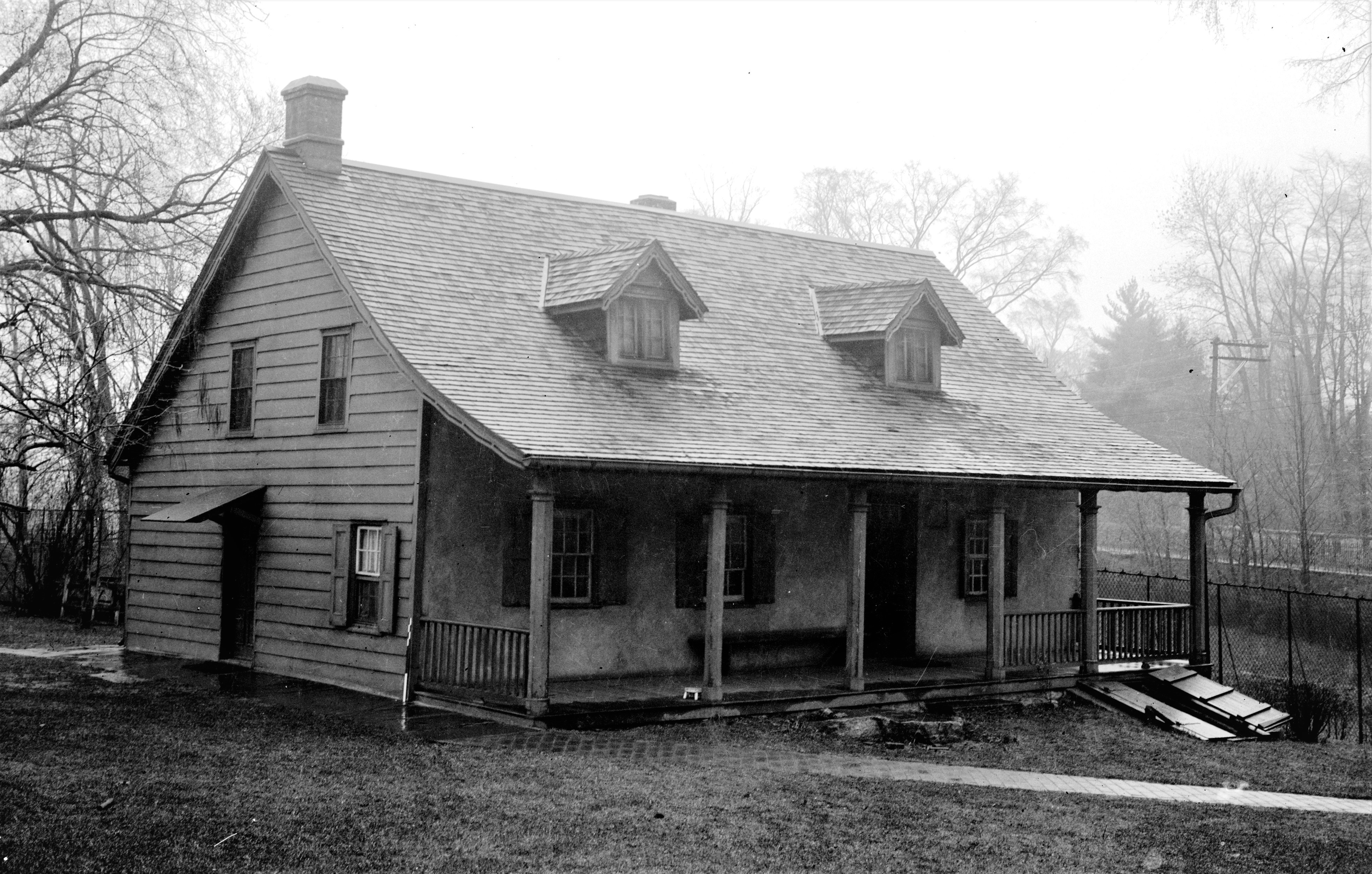
Odell's Tavern, the oldest house in Irvington

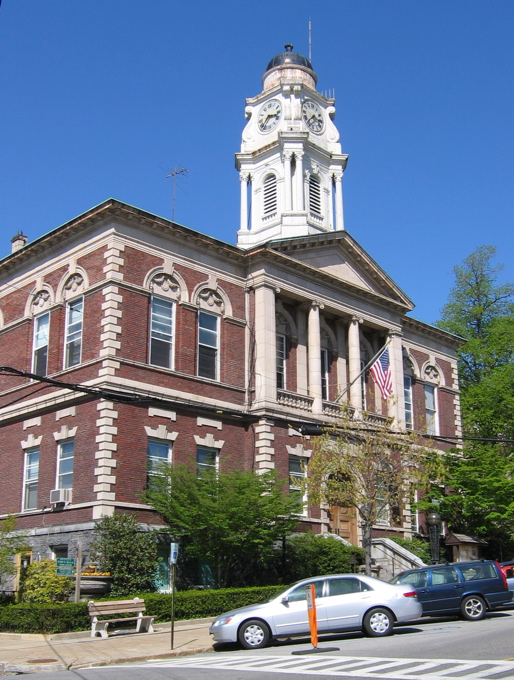
Irvington Town Hall

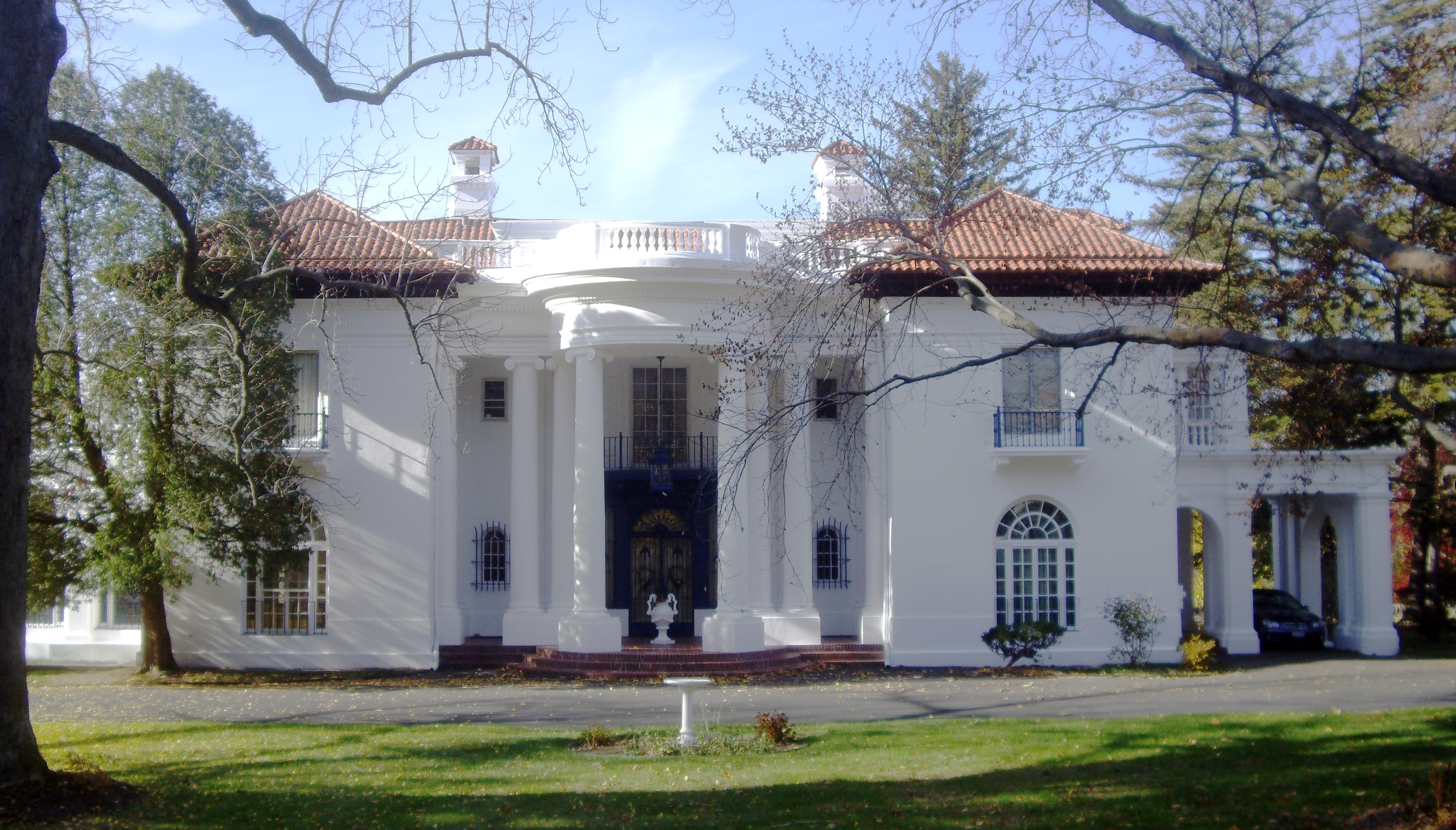
Villa Lewaro, built by Madam C. J. Walker, an African American woman who was America's first female millionaire

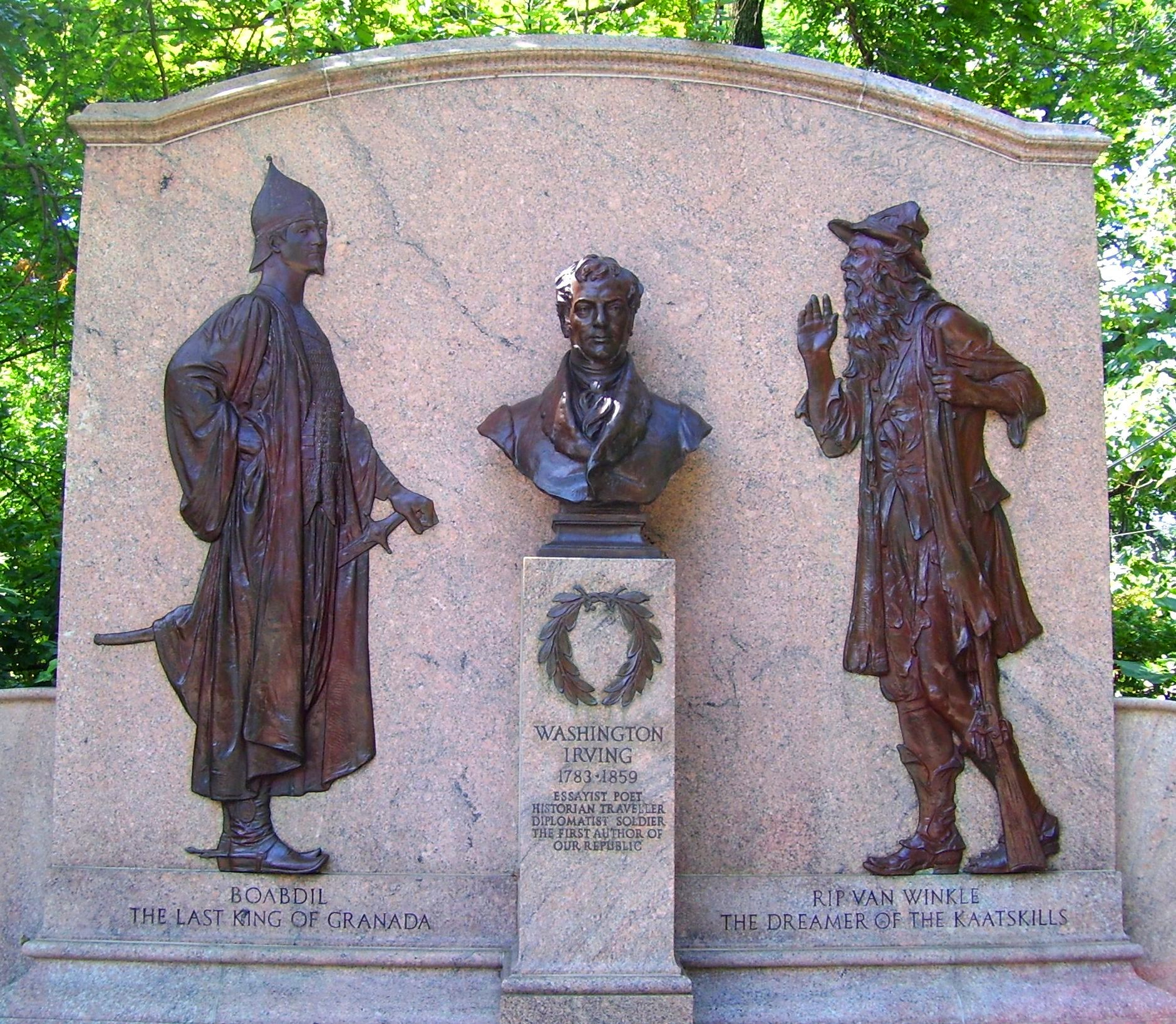
Washington Irving Memorial, by Daniel Chester French, the most prominent sculptor in the U.S. at the time
- Odell's Tavern (1693) – The main part of the Odell-Conklin-Harmse Tavern, the oldest house extant in Irvington, is constructed of fieldstone, with walls that are four feet thick. It was built by Jan Harmse after he moved to the area from Long Island, and was converted to a tavern in 1742 Mathius and Sophia Conklin, a function it served until sometime in the 19th century. The "Convention of the Representatives of the State of New York" stopped there in April 1776, when Jonathan Odell was the proprietor, on their way out of New York City when the British occupied it, and discussed General Washington's defeat at the Battle of Long Island. In 1989, the Village of Irvington had the opportunity to purchase for $5.5 million the 10.5-acre (4.2 ha) Murray-Griffin property that includes the Tavern, as well as 19th century barn and carriage house and a 23-room four-story Bedford stone house built in 1938, but did not. The Tavern, which in 2006 was reported as having undergone a recent restoration using artisans from Lyndhurst, is now part of a private residence and is not open to the public. (South Broadway at West Clinton Avenue)
- Shadowbrook (1895), is a 9-acre estate built for banker Henry Graves, located at the corner of West Sunnyside Lane and Broadway just over the border in Tarrytown. It has been the home of Irving Berlin, the noted American songwriter, and jazz musician Stan Getz. It was designed by noted architect R. H. Robertson in the Tudor Revival style. Robertson also designed Richmond Hill, an estate located at the corner of Broadway and Harriman Road in Irvington, which was later utilized as a laboratory for the North American Philips Company and then the Yeshiva Ohel Shmuel, a boarding school for high school and college students, before being torn down in 1979–80 to be replaced by condominiums. Shadowbrook has been converted into multiple private residences, and is not open to the public, although the mansion is sometimes used for weddings and other events.(821 South Broadway, Tarrytown)
- Station Road Tunnel (1837–1842) – At Station Road, west of Broadway, the Old Croton Aqueduct passes overhead inside a large stone and earthwork viaduct which spans what was the culvert formed by Jewel's Brook. Through the viaduct passes a single-lane tunnel to allow the road to pass through, and another smaller tunnel to the north to allow Jewel's Brook – now known as Barney Brook – through as well. The tunnel plays a major part in the 2016 film The Girl on the Train. (Station Road west of South Broadway)
- Strawberry Hill (1855, expanded c.1870s) – This stone mansion in Norman Victorian Gothic style was built by John Thomas and expanded by Edward Delano Lindsay for John Williams. Still a private residence as of 1995, it has pointed gables, turrets and large shuttered windows. (North Broadway)
- Sunnyside (1656/1835) – In 1835 Washington Irving bought for $1,800 a two-room pitched-roofed Dutch farm house built in 1656 from the property that was William Ecker's, and spent 15 years expanding and redesigning the house with the help of his friend and neighbor George Harvey, a landscape painter. Ten years later Irving continued, adding a tower his friends called "The Pagoda". Today, the house is owned and operated as a museum by Historic Hudson Valley. (West Sunnyside Lane at the river)

- Washington Irving Memorial (1927) - Designed by Daniel Chester French, America's leading sculptor at the time and the designer of the Lincoln Memorial in Washington, D.C., the Irving memorial, which is on the National Register of Historic Places (2000), shows a bust of Irving flanked by two of his characters, Boabdil from The Alhambra and Rip van Winkle, all set against polished pink Vermont granite. (North Broadway at West Sunnyside Lane)

- Town Hall (1902) – The Irvington Town Hall, which was listed on the National Register of Historic Places in 1984, is built on land deeded to the village before the turn of the 20th century by the Mental and Moral Improvement Society of Irvington, of which Charles Lewis Tiffany – founder of Tiffany & Co. and the father of Louis Comfort Tiffany – was the president. The society required that the building must have in perpetuity a reading room, and also specified that it have a public hall. The brick, stone and terra cotta building, which is called a "Town Hall" despite Irvington being only a village, was designed by Alfred J. Manning and cost $150,000 to build. The library was to replace the short-lived Irvington Free Library (later the "Atheneum") which began in the local "little red schoolhouse". The new library, which opened in 1902, was designed by Louis Comfort Tiffany, with Tiffany-glass lighting fixtures. The furnishings were donated by Helen Gould, the daughter of Jay Gould, and Frederick W. Guiteau – uncle of Charles J. Guiteau, who assassinated President James Garfield – paid for the books with a $10,000 endowment which he originally intended to bequeath to it in his will. Although in 2000 the library moved into the Burnham Building, a reading room, the "Tiffany Room", remains in the Town Hall, to fulfill the requirements of the deed. The reading room was restored in 2004.
  In front of the Town Hall is a stone fountain memorial to Dr. Isaiah Ashton, the village physician who died in 1889. It was originally located on Broadway, where it was intended to be used to water horses. A recently installed statue of Rip Van Winkle stands next to the Town Hall, on the grounds of the Main Street School. Beginning on August 1, 2016, restoration of the exterior began. Although the project was held up by a work stoppage and contractual disputes with the contractor. The work, which will provide new windows, masonry and terra-cotta tiles specifically produced for the building, is projected to be completed by April 2017. (Main Street at North Ferris Street)

- Town Hall Theater (1902, restored 1979-80) - The theater was designed to be a replica of Ford's Theatre in Washington, where Abraham Lincoln was assassinated, and when completed in 1902 it was widely thought to be one of the best "opera houses" in the Hudson Valley. For decades the social life of Irvington revolved around the theater, which hosted concerts, recitals, balls, cotillions, graduations, minstrel shows, auditions, political rallies and public meetings. Eleanor Roosevelt spoke at a Democratic rally just before her husband was elected President in 1932. Opera singer Lillian Nordica performed there, and Ted Mack auditioned talent for his Original Amateur Hour there as well. However, it gradually fell into disuse and disrepair by the 1960s, being used only for occasional exhibitions and overnight "camping" by the local Boy Scout troops. In 1978 concerted citizen action started the ball rolling to completely renovate and revitalize the theater, and it re-opened in 1980, run by Irvington Town Hall Theater, Inc., a non-profit corporation under the auspices of the Town Hall Theater Commission, whose members are appointed by the mayor. Today, the Town Hall Theater presents a wide variety of events, including concerts, plays and musicals – as well as the "Best of Film" series begun in 2007, an "All Shorts" film festival started in 2015, and a Playwright Festival inaugurated in 2017, – in its 432-seat facility. In 2016, the village received community revitalization funding as part of New NY Bridge, which it will use to create a street-level plaza for the theater. As of 2019, the theater's website was using the name "Irvington Theater". In April 2021, the Irvington Shakespeare Company was founded to perform at the theater. (Main Street at North Ferris Street)

- Villa Lewaro (1917) – Among Irvington's famous residents was Madam C. J. Walker, America's first female millionaire. An African American woman, she made her fortune by developing a line of hair care products, creating a company with 20,000 sales agents, and by investing in real estate. In 1917, Madam Walker had a $250,000 country home built on Broadway in Irvington, designed by Vertner Woodson Tandy, the first registered African-American architect in New York State. She wanted the home to be an example for her people, "to see what could be accomplished, no matter what their background." The name Villa Lewaro was coined by Enrico Caruso, from the first two letters of each word in Lelia Walker Robinson, the name of her daughter, who later went by the name of A'Lelia Walker.

Walker inherited the house, and occupied it until her death in 1931, when it was bequeathed to the NAACP which opted to take the proceeds from the sale of the house rather than assume the cost of taxes and upkeep during the Great Depression. The house became the Annie E. Poth Home, a retirement home for seniors operated by the Companions of the Forest, until the 1970s. The neo-Palladian-style mansion still stands today, and is again a private residence. Villa Lewaro is a National Historic Landmark. (North Broadway at Fargo Lane)

- Wisteria Cottage - This private residence located at 359 Mountain Road (Note: Not #379 as reported in the news.com.au article. There is no house at #379, and the house pictured in the article is #359.) in the East Irvington neighborhood, was the place where Albert Fish – who would later serve as the inspiration for the character Hannibal Lecter – murdered and ate 10-year old Grace Budd in 1928. The house was abandoned at the time that Fish brought the child there on the premise that she would be attending his niece's birthday party, but both the niece and the party were inventions. Fish already had a history of molesting and torturing disabled children, and had specifically picked out the house to murder his next victim. The house sold c.2016 for over a million dollars.
- Woodcliff Manor - A Gilded Age mansion owned by the family of J. P. Morgan. George Denison Morgan, a distant cousin of J. P. Morgan, was already the owner of the estate when the village of Dearman was established in 1850. J. P. Morgan's son, J. P. Morgan Jr. {"Jack") was born in the mansion in 1867. In 2026, the building is in danger of being torn down to make way for a 53-unit multi-family housing project including "affordable" units proposed by Varma RE Development of Morristown, New Jersey. Some residents of Irvington are vigorously fighting the project. (76 North Broadway)

== Quality of life ==
In an October 2010 ranking of the "Best Places to Live", Westchester Magazine listed Irvington as #1 and called it "charming, quiet, green, with a darling Main Street, stunning river views, [and] a burgeoning dining scene... a great mix." Factors in which Irvington was not highly ranked included "Diversity" and "Property tax", both with a score of four out of ten, and "Housing cost", with a five.

In May 2015, the village released a report which indicated that its water supply exceeded the requirements laid down by the State of New York.

In November 2016, Rivertowns Patch rated Irvington 17th among the "30 Safest Places To Live In New York – 2016". Its violent crime rate per 1000 was 0.2, and its property crime rate, also per 1000, was 2.7.

Niche.com, a rating and ranking website, listed Irvington as #16 of all New York locations on its list of "Best Suburbs to Live in New York State", one of 28 choices in the Hudson River Valley, although Irvington was not listed among the top 100 in the U.S. Factors considered for the April 2017 list included the quality of the schools, the crime rate, employment, amenities, using data from the Bureau of Labor Statistics. the U.S. Census Bureau, and the FBI. In May 2017, Niche rated Irvington as "A+" in their list of the best and worst places to live in New York.

On the other hand, in February 2016 the website RoadSnacks, in an article which made clear that it was "opinion based on fact" and intended as "infotainment", not as serious science, listed Irvington as the third most boring place in New York State, after Briarcliff Manor and Rye Brook in Westchester, and just above Croton-on-Hudson, also in Westchester, and Chestnut Ridge in Rockland.

In 2020, during the COVID-19 pandemic, when many wealthy New York City residents abandoned the city to move to places which were considered to be safer and less affected by the virus, Irvington was one of the places in Westchester County which showed "a significant increase in sales by New York City residents".

=== Parks and recreation ===
As of 2018 about 35% of Irvington's land is undeveloped public land, and, as of 2010, 23 percent of the land in Irvington is set aside for parks and recreation. Three of Irvington's parks, Memorial Park (Dows Lane or Station Road), Matthiessen Park (Bridge Street off Astor Street), and Halsey Pond Park, are open only to village residents with a permit, but others are accessible by the general public. The Irvington Parks and Recreation Department is located in the Isabel K. Benjamin Community Center on Main Street.

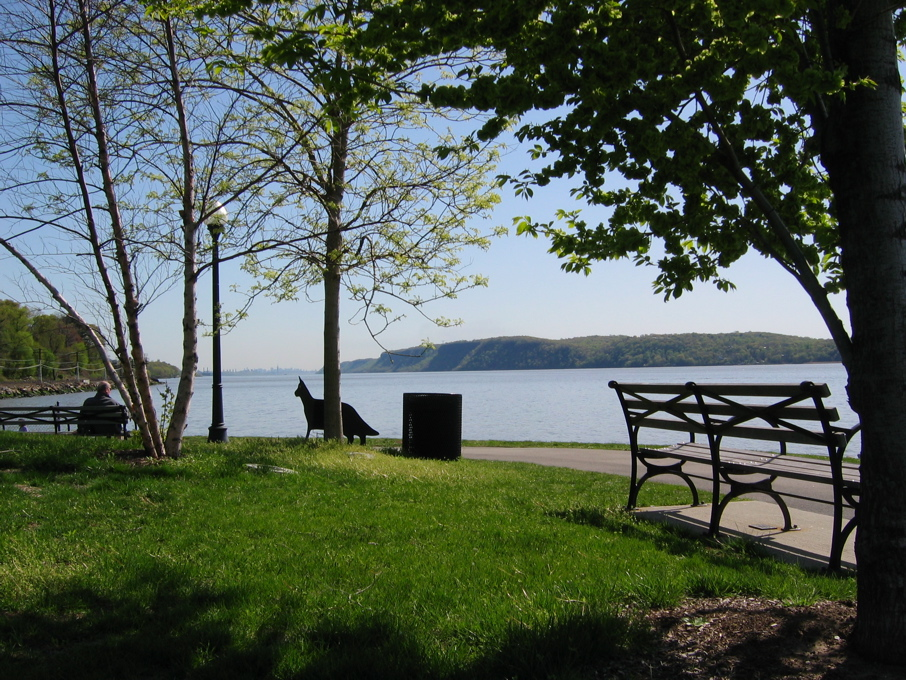
Scenic Hudson Park

- There are no public golf courses located in Irvington, but the Ardsley Country Club, a private club founded in 1895, is located in Ardsley-on-Hudson, which is part of Irvington. The Ardsley Curling Club is located on the grounds of the country club.
- Westchester County's V. Everit Macy Park is partly located in Irvington, along the Saw Mill River Parkway at the eastern side of the village boundaries. Created in 1926 and originally called "Woodlands Park", it was renamed for the scion of the Macy family, who was Westchester's first commissioner of public welfare and later became a local newspaper baron. The park has three distinct areas with slightly different atmospheres. One part, with an entrance in Ardsley (not Ardsley-on-Hudson) on Saw Mill Road, functions as a local park with ballfields, a playground, public toilets and picnic pavilion. Another, accessible by car only by the northbound lanes of the Saw Mill River Parkway, features the Great Hunger Memorial commemorating the Irish famine of 1845–1852 which drove many Irish immigrants to settle in Westchester. The area also includes Woodlands Lake, with fishing, ice skating, a recently closed restaurant, access to the South County Trailway, and 500 feet (150 m) of the former Putnam Division Railroad. The final area is largely undeveloped. A county park permit may be required for some uses of the park.
- Irvington Woods Hiking Trails – an extensive network of hiking trails, most of them fairly non-strenuous, criss-crosses the woods between Broadway and the Saw Mill River Parkway. Highlights of the area include the Irvington Reservoir and its associated watershed as well as the Hermit's Grave, the grave of a 19th century immigrant who called the woods his home. (trailheads on Cyrus Field Road, Mountain Road, Fieldpoint Road, and East Field near Irvington High School)
- The Old Croton Trailway State Historic Park and Trail, which runs along the Croton Aqueduct, traverses the village between Broadway and the Hudson River, and is a popular biking and jogging path. In 2016 the village received funding from the New York State Department of Transportation to improve the trail's crossing of Main Street with input from the New York State Parks Department. (west of Broadway)
- Scenic Hudson Park, which is co-owned by the village and the Scenic Hudson Land Trust, is located on the river side of the railroad tracks, not far from the foot of Main Street. Pedestrians can use the underpass at the train station while cars cross the tracks via Bridge Street. The park has ballfields, children's playgrounds, about a mile of flat walking paths, a boat launch and 4.5 acres (1.8 ha) of lawn. In 2016, The Journal News called the park "one of Westchester County's most popular public spaces." (Bridge Street at the river)
- Just south of the village's Matthiessen Park lies the Irvington Boat and Beach Club, a private club founded in the 1950s which is supported by member dues. The club is located off Bridge Street, and lies on land owned by Bridge Street Properties. The club has a pier connected to a floating dock from which members can swim, sunbathe or launch boats and kayaks. In 2017, the club spent $9,000 to shore up six of the pier's pilings. On Friday March 2, 2018, one of 6 runaway construction barges connected to the building of the nearby Governor Mario M. Cuomo Bridge, which broke away during a nor'easter with over 50 mph (80 km/h; 22 m/s) winds, crashed into the pier, destroying it. The club's Vice Commodore speculated that the barge went upriver during high tide, and came back down during low tide. One of the other barges capsized off of Yonkers, south of Irvington, while two others ran aground near Alpine, New Jersey, across the river. The Coast Guard, assisted by Westchester County Police Marine Unit, intercepted the remaining two barges.

=== Restaurants ===
One of the first of the notable restaurants to be founded in Irvington was "Mima Vinoteca" on Main Street, begun by Dana Santucci in 2007. In 2009, Westchester Magazine named Irvington as the best place for "foodies" to live on the west side of Westchester County, although the article named only two restaurants in the village itself – "Red Hat" and "Chutney Masala" – as well as others in nearby Dobbs Ferry, Hastings and Tarrytown. In May 2012, chef Michael Psilakis opened "MP Taverna" in a space in the former Lord & Burnham warehouses near the river. In 2013, the "Sixty One Bistro" opened at 61 Main Street, and in November 2014, "Wolfert's Roost" – named after the original name of Washington Irving's Sunnyside estate – opened at 100 Main Street with an "exuberant" menu, which includes a 38-ounce steak for $129 that "looks like something Fred Flintstone might have slapped on the grill"; in October 2016 it was announced that it would be closing as a full-time restaurant in favor of catering and occasional "pop up" restaurants. The owner, Eric Korn, was also opening a traditional pizza shop on the same block. Also on Main Street is "La Chinita Poblana", which also opened in 2014, a strong, un-"kitschy" Mexican restaurant decorated with paintings by Diego Rivera, and "Chutney Masala", a Tandoori restaurant, which moved in 2016 from the Irvington waterfront to 76 Main Street. In October 2016, the owner of "Chutney Masala" opened "Sambal Thai and Malaysian" on Main Street.

In addition, Irvington's former New York Central Railroad station house, which was a ticket office from 1889 to 1957, is now, in 2016, with the addition of an outdoor garden, "Brrzaar", a 20-seat café. In December 2020, Esquire magazine highlighted the "Irvington Delight Market", a bodega on the corner of South Broadway and Main Street, which specializes in homemade Middle Eastern food, as one of "100 Restaurants America Can't Afford to Lose".

== Notable people ==
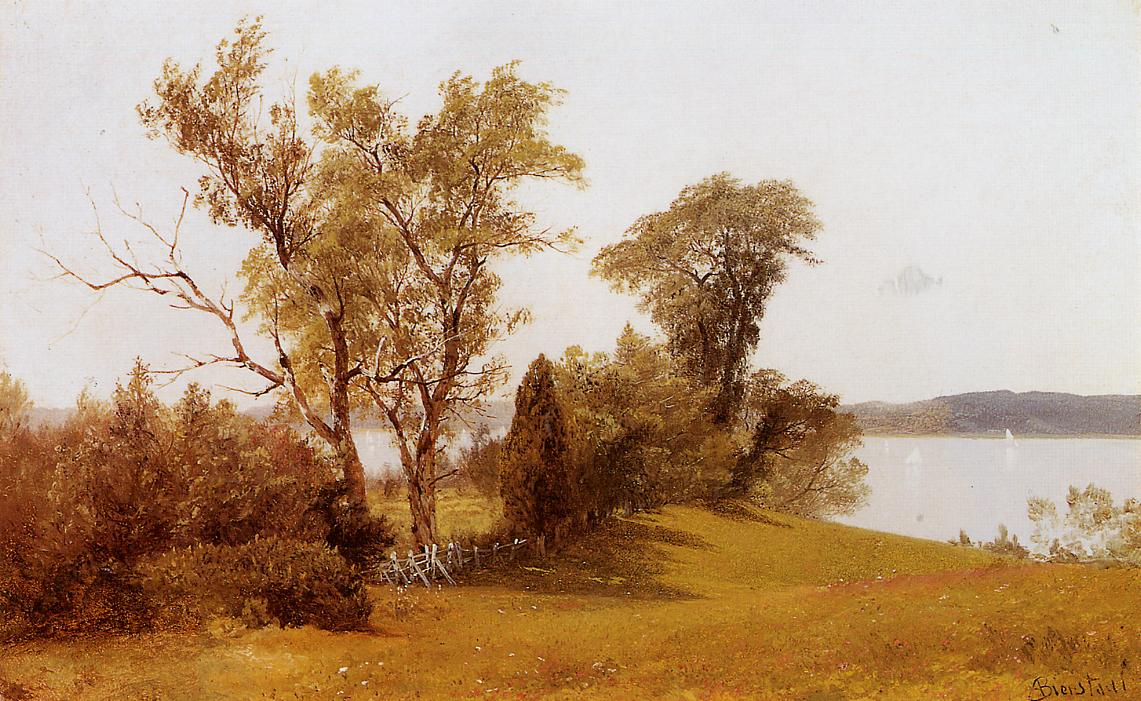
Sailboats on the Hudson at Irvington (1889) by Albert Bierstadt

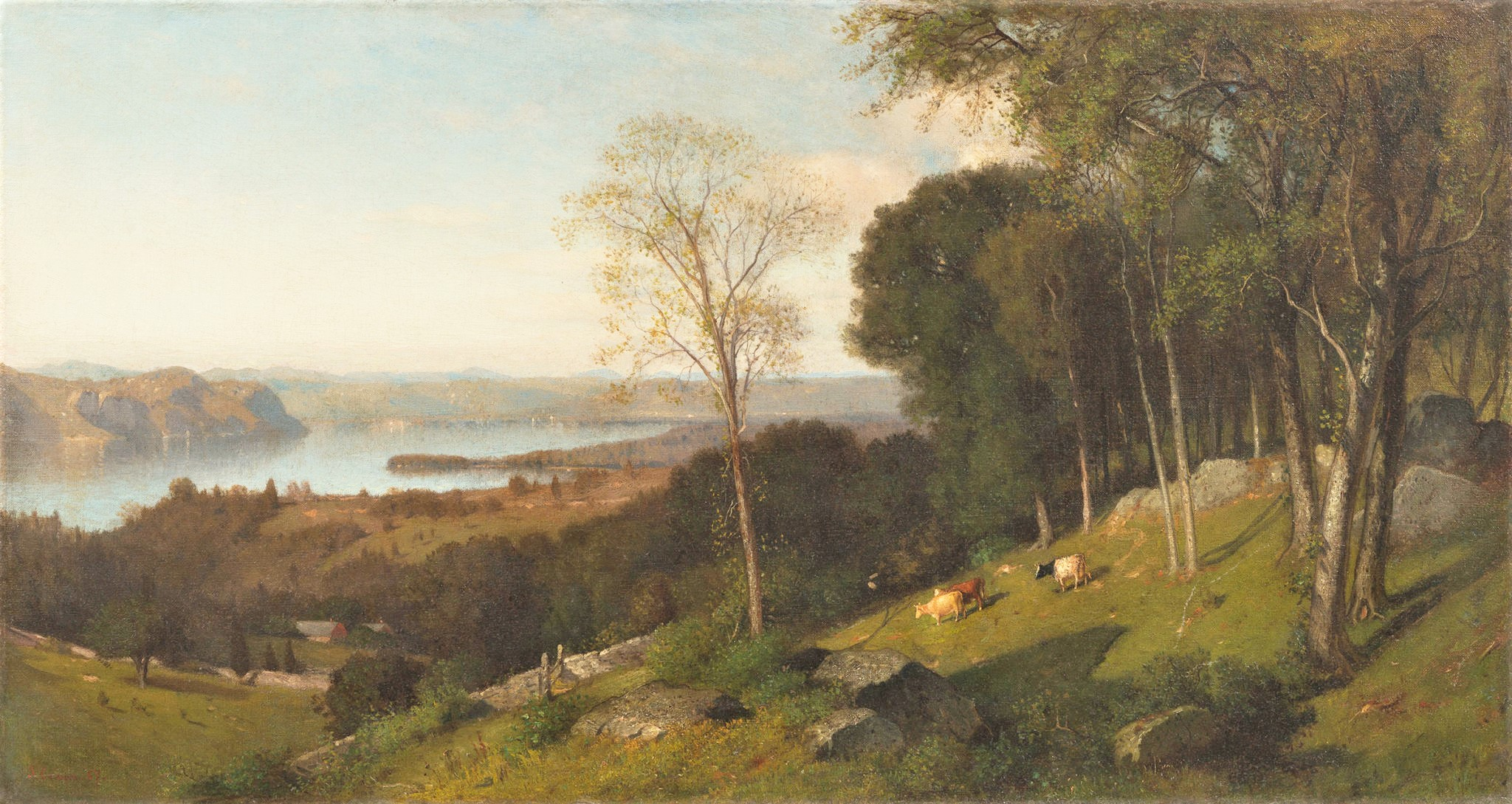
Hudson River from Irvington (1867) by Samuel Colman. The view is from "Strawberry Hill", the John Williams estate

=== Notable past residents ===
Notable past residents of Irvington include: John Jacob Astor III, the wealthiest man in America at the time; Amzi Lorenzo Barber, the asphalt king; Albert Bierstadt, a noted landscape painter; Samuel Colman, a landscape painter of the Hudson River School, lived in Irvington in the 1860s and made a number of paintings featuring the countryside around the village. While there, he had Louis Comfort Tiffany as one of his students; Chauncey M. Depew, president of the New York Central Railroad and a United States senator; Composer George Drumm lived in Irvington's Half Moon apartment complex in his later life; Cyrus W. Field, who laid the first transatlantic telegraph cable, who once owned 800 acres (320 ha) in the area– now known as Ardsley Park – and whose 8,000 square feet (740 m^{2}) house "Inanda" – meaning "pleasant place" in Zulu – he built in 1875 for one of his daughter and her husband went on the market in 2016 for $2.95 million., later reduced to $2.85 million; Frank Jay Gould, the philanthropist son of Jay Gould; and Frederick W. Guiteau and David Dows, who made their millions in grain commissions and railroads. James Alexander Hamilton, the son of Alexander Hamilton and onetime acting secretary of State of New York, had his estate "Nevis" in Irvington. He died there on September 24, 1878.

The Reverend Sun Myung Moon, head of the Unification Church, had a residence in Irvington at the time of his death; Lillian Nordica, a noted opera singer of the late 19th and early 20th centuries; Charles Lewis Tiffany the founder of Tiffany & Co., whose son, Louis Comfort Tiffany, designed the Tiffany glass which can be seen in the clock tower and lighting fixtures in the Town Hall and the stained glass windows in the Presbyterian Church; Madam C. J. Walker (see "Villa Lewaro" in Points of Interest above); and Justine Bayard Cutting Ward, who developed the Ward method of music education.

Jazz saxophonist Stan Getz lived in Irvington – his estate, "Shadowbrook", is less than a mile from Washington Irving's home, at the intersection of Broadway and West Sunnyside Lane; Getz' ex-wife, Monica still resides in the village (see below). Stan Getz's contemporary, jazz drummer and bandleader Mel Lewis (né Melvin Sokoloff) also lived in Irvington.

Silent film and Broadway theater actor William Black was born in Irvington, as was Julianna Rose Mauriello, the star of the children's television series LazyTown. Actress Joan Blondell lived in Irvington for a time, in the late 1940s and early 1950s, with her husband – movie producer Mike Todd – and Blondell's children, including Norman S. Powell (the adopted son of Dick Powell), who went to Irvington's public schools.

In the 1970s, actors Jack Cassidy and Shirley Jones, who were married, lived for a time in Irvington, along with their son Shaun Cassidy – but not David Cassidy, who no longer lived with the family by then. Shaun attended the Irvington Public Schools for a short time. Actress and filmmaker Penny Peyser – whose father, Peter A. Peyser was the mayor of the village for eight years, and later a three-term Congressman – grew up in Irvington and attended the public schools there, graduating in 1969.

Ted Mack, for many years the host of Ted Mack's Original Amateur Hour on television, was also a resident, as was actress Patricia Neal, who lived in Irvington for a while. Oscar-winning cinematographer Wally Pfister, noted for his work on Inception (2010) and Christopher Nolan's Batman films, was raised in Irvington in the 1960s and 70s, and attended the local schools. The acting couple Debra Winger and Arliss Howard also lived in Irvington. Singer Julius La Rosa lived in Irvington for over 40 years, until November 2015.

Poet Lucia Perillo – who received a MacArthur "Genius" grant in 2000, and died of multiple sclerosis in 2016 – grew up in Irvington in the 1960s. Historical author Robert K. Massie lived in Irvington for over 50 years, and died there in his home in 2019.

=== Notable current residents ===
Irvington is currently home to a number of notable people, including: Michael Douglas and Catherine Zeta-Jones, who bought a 12-acre estate with a 22-room 8-bedroom Georgian mansion on Fargo Lane in September 2019 for $4.5 million – the property has been described as "arguably the best large track of riverfront property available in Westchester"; professional golfer Danny Balin, retired TV weatherman Storm Field; designer Eileen Fisher; Sesame Workshop co-founder Monica Getz; jazz musician Bob James; David A. Kaplan, Israeli-American pianist Elisha Abas, journalist and author of The Most Dangerous Branch: Inside the Supreme Court's Assault on the Constitution; Formula 500 race car driver David Lapham, choreographer Peter Martins and former New York City Ballet dancer Darci Kistler; Fox News newscaster Jon Scott; and television host Meredith Vieira. As of February 2020, Dan Peres, a memoirist and former high-profile magazine editor, lived in Irvington.

== In popular culture ==
Films and television
The following films include scenes shot in Irvington:

- Trial Run of the Fastest Boat in the World, "The Arrow" (1903)
- North by Northwest (1959) – passing scenery through window of train
- Shamus (1973)
- The Nesting (1981)
- Falling In Love (1984)
- This Pretty Planet: Tom Chapin in Concert (1992)
- The Age of Innocence (1993) – Nuits solarium
- The Last Seduction (1994)
- The Juror (1996)
- The Devil's Own (1997) – The Church of St. Barnabas
- Unfaithful (2002) – Ardsley-on-Hudson train station
- Cruel to Be Kind (short, 2004)
- Peace of Mind (short, 2005)
- The Hoax (2006)
- Across the Universe (2007)
- The Potion (short, 2013)
- The Girl on the Train (2016) – Nuits, Station Road tunnel, Arsdley-on-Hudson train station
- Wilde Wedding (2017) – Ardsley-on-Hudson train station, Station Road tunnel, Town Hall, Irvington Public Library, and around the Reservoir on Harriman Road

- Episodes of the TV programs America's Castles – "Empire Estates" (1997) – and Vetted were partly filmed in the village.
- The village was also featured in a short comic film by Gary Weis broadcast on the January 17, 1976, episode of Saturday Night Live; it showed Buck Henry looking for Irvington's funniest person.
- Irvington was used as the location for a television commercial for the New York State Lottery (c.2009), featuring the character "Little Bit of Luck", and the Ardsley-on-Hudson train station was featured in a commercial for Dr. Pepper.

Literature

- Part of Clarence Day's family memoir Life with Father (1935), takes place in Irvington when the family lived there.
