= Ardsley-on-Hudson station =

Metro-North Railroad station in New York

Ardsley-on-Hudson
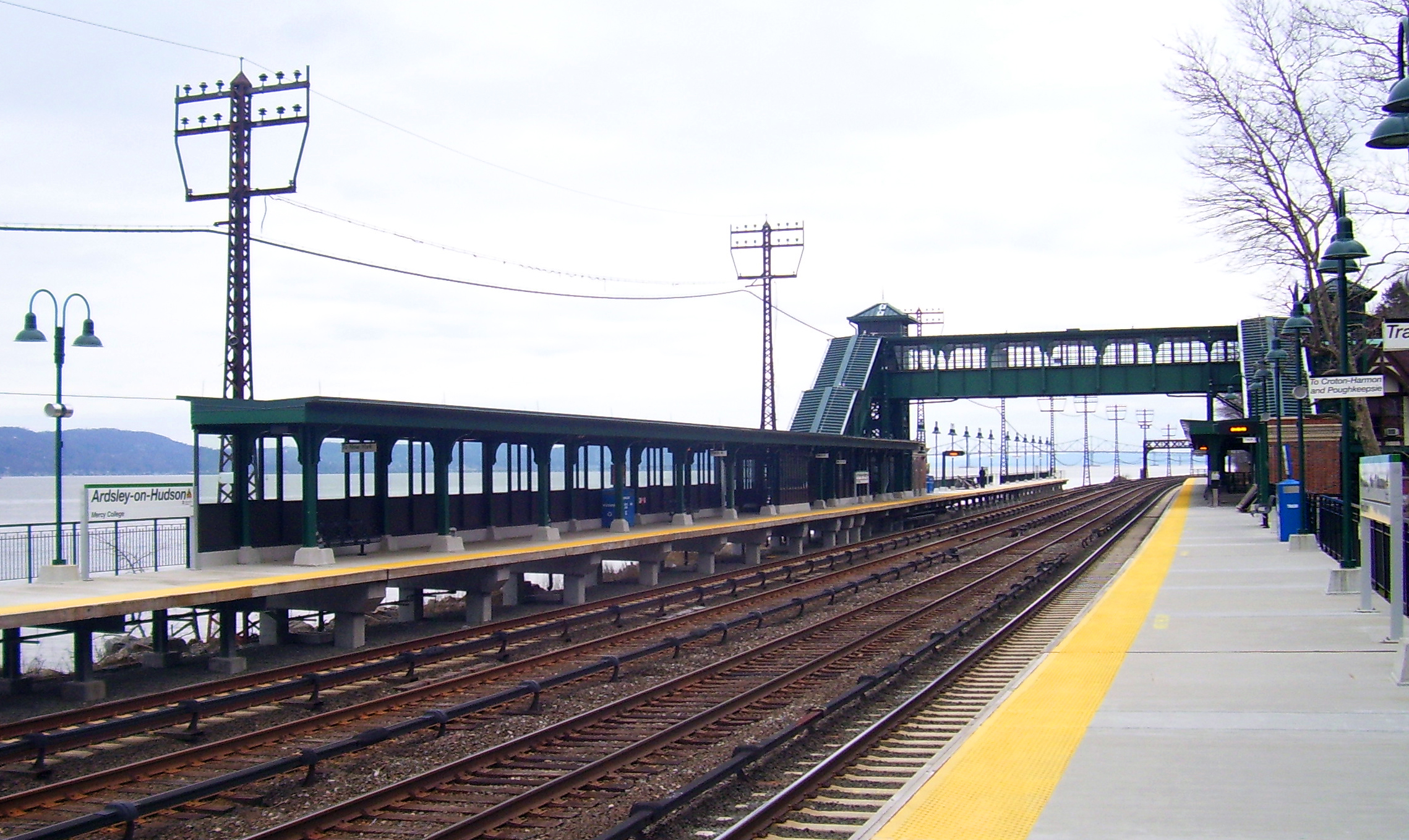
- View looking northbound from east platform; the Tappan Zee Bridge is visible beyond the station.

General information
- Location: 1 Ardsley Avenue, Irvington, New York
- Coordinates: 41°01′37″N 73°52′37″W
- Line: Hudson Line
- Platforms: 2 side platforms
- Tracks: 4

Construction
- Accessible: yes

Other information
- Fare zone: 4

History
- Opened: ca. 1896
- Rebuilt: 2006–07
- Electrified: 700V (DC) third rail

Passengers
- 2018: 587 (Metro-North)
- Rank: 69 of 109

Services
Preceding station	Metro-North Railroad	Following station
Irvington toward Croton–Harmon	Hudson Line	Dobbs Ferry toward Grand Central

Former services
Preceding station	New York Central Railroad	Following station
Irvington toward Peekskill	Hudson Division	Dobbs Ferry toward New York
Location

Ardsley-on-Hudson station is a commuter rail stop on the Metro-North Railroad's Hudson Line, located in the Ardsley Park area of Irvington, New York. It serves both the neighborhood and the northern part of the village of Dobbs Ferry; the main campus of Mercy University is within walking distance of the station.

As of August 2006, daily commuter ridership was 420 and there were 134 parking spots.

== History ==
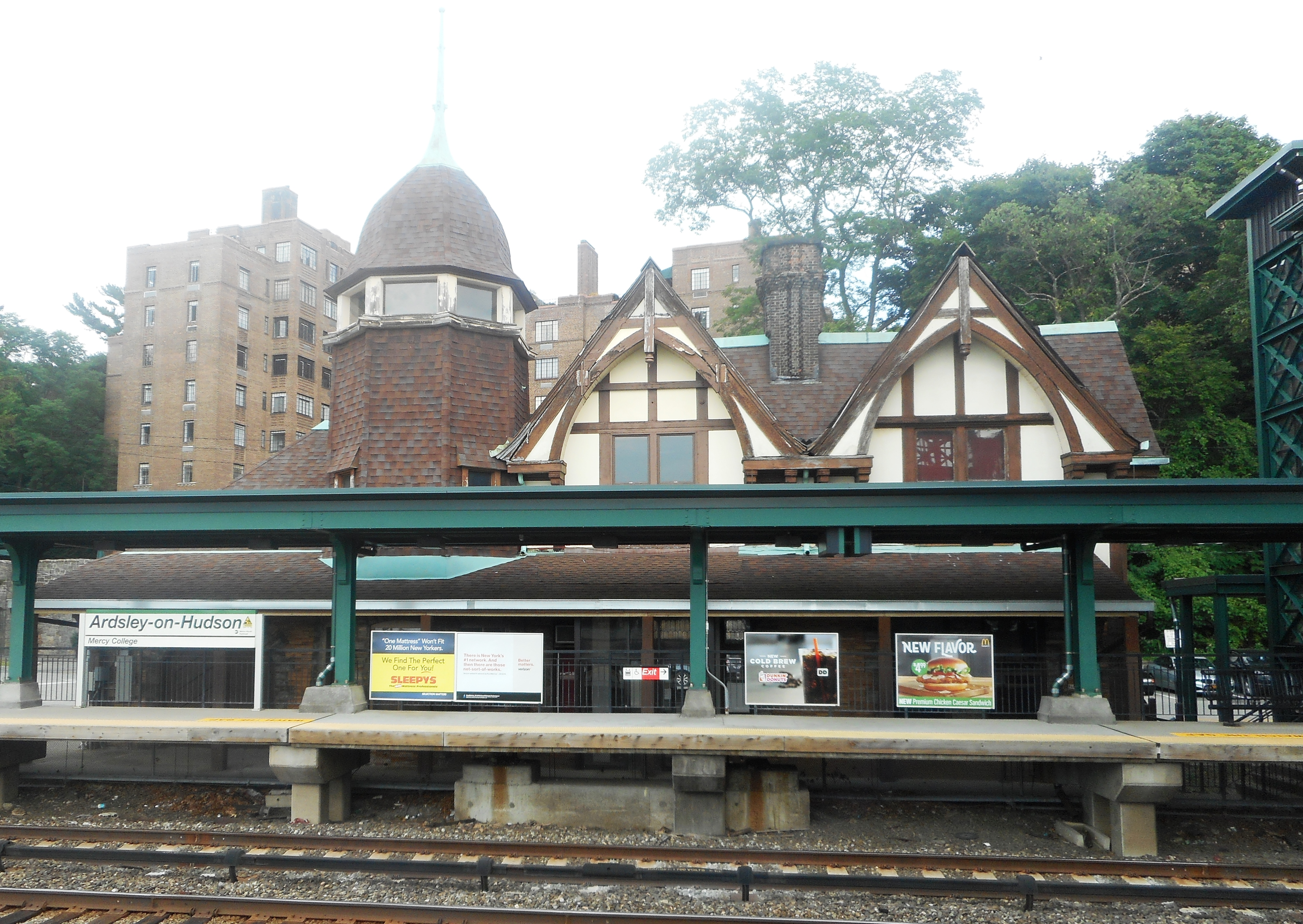
The original New York Central Railroad station house along the northbound platform with features dating back to the demolished Ardsley Casino Country Club.

The station was originally part of the Ardsley Casino Clubhouse, a country club created through the support of some of the most notable and successful men in the US including Jay Gould, Cornelius Vanderbilt (New York Central entrepreneur) and John Pierpont Morgan. The Casino was built overlooking the Hudson River and besides the station, had a private dock to accommodate the yachts of members. The Ardsley Racquet and Swim Club, an offshoot established in 1927, inherited the property in 1935, and the casino was closed in 1936. The site was replaced by the Hudson House Apartments. Even with all the changes, the original mid-1890s New York Central Railroad depot remained intact. As with many stations along the Hudson Division, the New York Central merged with the Pennsylvania Railroad in 1968 to form Penn Central Railroad. The 1970 bankruptcy of Penn Central forced it to turn service over to the MTA, which continued through the time it was taken over by Conrail in 1976, and then by Metro-North Railroad in 1983. While there is no official station house, Metro-North does maintain a small two-story brick depot, housing the northbound waiting room, ticket machines, and the United States Post Office for ZIP Code 10503.

The crossover ramp to southbound or New York City-bound trains was inside the depot until 2006, when Metro-North razed the ramp and built one a few steps to the south, with a higher clearance for projected double-deck trains. At that time new, longer platforms were installed on both sides of the tracks. On February 1, 2010, a sanitation truck smashed into the historic pedestrian bridge leading from the station house to the Hudson House Apartments. The bridge was never rebuilt.

In December 2017, the Village Board of Irvington, which has jurisdiction over the station, passed local legislation which expanded the types of business which would be allowed to be situated in the station's building, while still prohibiting fast-food restaurants, drive-through type businesses and businesses which produced "odor, dust, noise, smoke, gas, fumes or radiation".

== Station layout ==
The station has two slightly offset high-level side platforms each eight cars long. Only one of the express tracks, specifically Track 2 is powered by third rail.

== In popular culture ==
The station was used as a location for the 2002 film Unfaithful, starring Richard Gere and Diane Lane. It also figured in the setting of the 1984 film Falling in Love. Emily Blunt's character Rachel takes the train out of Ardsley-on-Hudson in the 2016 film The Girl on the Train.
