= House Party, Inc. =

- Industry: Word of mouth marketing, Social media marketing, Experiential marketing
- Founded: 2005
- Headquarters: 50 South Buckhout Street, Suite 301; Irvington, New York
- Key people: Chris Maher, CEO
- Number of employees: 80
- Website: "www.houseparty.fun".

House Party, Inc. is an experiential, word of mouth marketing company based in Irvington, New York, that enables immersive hands-on interactions between consumers and brands. Founded in 2005, the company facilitates brand-sponsored “House Parties,” in-home events through which consumers and their invited guests can experience new products, television shows, software, books etc. Each House Party also features an online community where partygoers can access exclusive content, share photos and videos, and blog about their parties.

House Party, Inc. has been featured in The New York Times, USA Today, Forbes, The Wall Street Journal, and on CNBC. It has also won numerous industry awards, including Forrester Groundswell awards for its "Hershey Bliss" and Microsoft Windows 7 campaigns.
