= Irvington station (Metro-North) =

Metro-North Railroad station in New York

Irvington
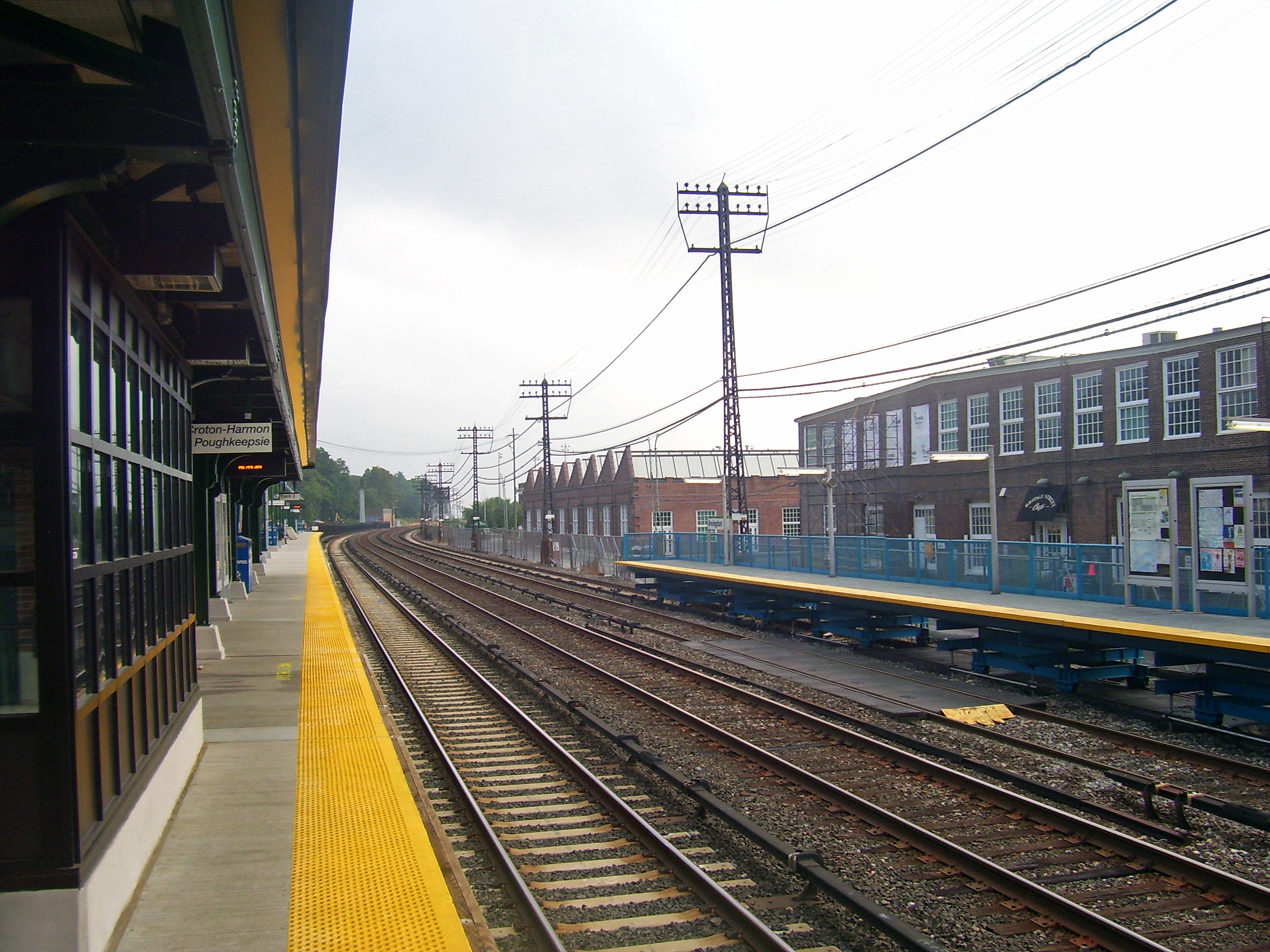
- Looking south along the tracks from the east platform. Temporary platform in place opposite during summer 2007 renovations.

General information
- Location: 1 Astor Street, Irvington, New York
- Coordinates: 41.0395°N 73.8733°W
- Line: Hudson Line
- Platforms: 2 side platforms
- Tracks: 4

Construction
- Parking: 283 spaces
- Accessible: Yes

Other information
- Fare zone: 4

History
- Opened: 1849
- Rebuilt: 1899
- Electrified: 700V (DC) third rail
- Former names: Dearman (1849–1854)

Passengers
- 2018: 1,222 (Metro-North)
- Rank: 49 of 109

Services
Preceding station	Metro-North Railroad	Following station
Tarrytown toward Croton–Harmon	Hudson Line	Ardsley-on-Hudson toward Grand Central

Former services
Preceding station	New York Central Railroad	Following station
Tarrytown toward Peekskill	Hudson Division	Ardsley-on-Hudson toward New York

U.S. Historic district – Contributing property
- Official name: Irvington New York Central Railroad Station
- Designated: January 15, 2014
- Part of: Irvington Historic District (New York)
- Reference no.: 13001095
- Architectural style: Richardson Romanesque
Location

Irvington station is a commuter rail stop on the Metro-North Railroad's Hudson Line, located in Irvington, New York.

== History ==
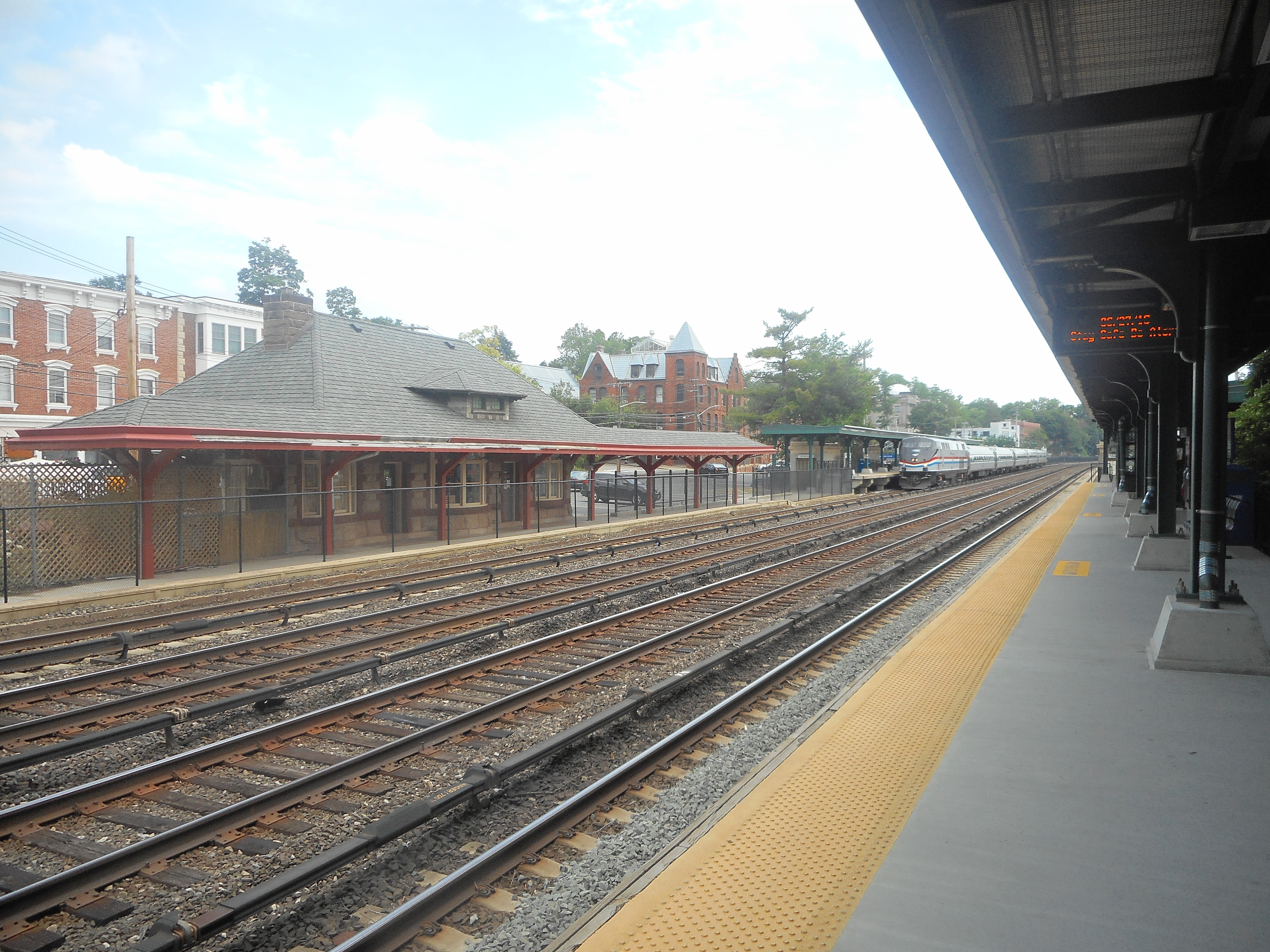
The old NYC station house as seen from the GCT-bound platform, now Ludy Cafe.

The Hudson River Railroad reached the settlement by 1849; the first passengers on a regularly scheduled run through the village paid fifty cents to travel from Peekskill to Chambers Street in Manhattan on September 29, 1849. The community was in the process of renaming itself after author Washington Irving, despite the fact that he was still alive at the time. In 1852, Irvington was also named for the first coal-fueled steam locomotive of the Hudson River Railroad. The HRR was acquired by the New York Central and Hudson River Railroad in 1869, and the New York Central Railroad in 1913.

The existing station house was built in 1889 and designed by the Shepley, Rutan and Coolidge architectural firm. As with most of the stations along the Hudson Line, it was transformed into a Penn Central station when New York Central merged with the Pennsylvania Railroad in 1968. Bankruptcy of the company followed by 1970, and Penn Central eventually turned passenger service over to the Metropolitan Transportation Authority of New York, who made it part of Metro-North in 1983.

Irvington's former New York Central Railroad station, built in 1889, has been a contributing property of the Irvington Historic District since January 15, 2014. Since being retired as a ticket office in 1957, it has been utilized as an art and curio shop, an office for the Weyerhauser lumber yard which was located on the other side of the tracks – now Scenic Hudson Park – and the office of an architectural firm. In 2016, with the addition of an outdoor garden, it was converted into a 20-seat café serving frozen yogurt. The café later shut down in late 2023, replaced by Ludy Cafe the next year.

== Station layout ==
The station has two slightly offset high-level side platforms each eight cars long. Track 1 is only used by diesel trains since it does not have a third rail.
