= The Gravel Institute =

American progressive think tank

- Formation: 2020
- Founders: Mike Gravel
- Type: 501(c)4 nonprofit
- Location: New York, United States
- Key people: Henry Williams (Chair)

YouTube information
- Channel: The Gravel Institute
- Years active: 2020–2022
- Genres: Politics; current affairs
- Subscribers: 400,000
- Views: 17.9 million
- Last updated: 2 August 2025

The Gravel Institute (/ɡrəˈvɛl/ grə-VELL) was an American progressive left-wing advocacy group founded in 2020 that aimed to counteract American conservative think tanks in general, particularly PragerU. The Gravel Institute was named for its founder Mike Gravel, a former United States senator from Alaska and two-time U.S. presidential candidate. The Gravel Institute promoted left-wing views, including wealth redistribution, criticism of United States foreign policy, and direct democracy.

== Mission ==
The Gravel Institute was created with the explicit goal of countering PragerU, with Henry Williams stating "the issues that we've so far focused on were, on the one hand, drawn from looking at PragerU topics and countering them" in an interview with Salon. The Gravel Institute collaborated with a number of organizations, including the People's Policy Project (3P) and the Economic Policy Institute (EPI).

According to the official website, the Institute's mission was to "build the institutions the left needs to win". According to David Oks, the Institute's "main target audience is people who are in the center, but don't have particularly well-thought-out political beliefs", adding: "I don't really think we're going to be converting people who consume PragerU."

== History ==
After Mike Gravel's 2020 presidential campaign ended in 2019, leadership from the campaign launched The Gravel Institute in 2019 using a $25,000 donation by Tumblr founder David Karp.

The Gravel Institute was mainly run by Williams, Oks, and Henry Magowan, who ran Gravel's 2020 presidential campaign when they were teenagers. Mike Gravel himself, who was 90 years old when the Institute launched, was not involved in day-to-day operations but served as a consultant and provided advice.

On September 28, 2020, The Gravel Institute uploaded their first video, formally introducing the project, narrated by H. Jon Benjamin. Also on September 28, The Gravel Institute uploaded their first video focused on a specific subject.

In February 2022, The Gravel Institute announced a new board of directors, including former Ohio State Senator Nina Turner and Bhaskar Sunkara, the founder of American socialist magazine Jacobin.

In February 2022, The Daily Beast alleged that a video released by The Gravel Institute in mid-February on the Azov Battalion, titled "How America Funded Ukraine’s Neo-Nazis" and later renamed "America, Russia, and Ukraine’s Far-Right Problem", contained controversial talking points about the influence of neo-Nazism in the Ukrainian government and claimed that Ukrainian nationalism is linked to Nazism. The Daily Beast also accused the institute of publishing misinformation about Ukraine. The Gravel Institute responded by claiming that the video was accurate and was reviewed by experts prior to publication.

In June 2023, a banner was posted on the Gravel Institute's website announcing that the site would be taken down due to unpaid hosting costs.

== Presenters and contributors ==
As of 2022, presenters and contributors to Gravel Institute videos included Cornel West, Slavoj Zizek, David Cross, and H. Jon Benjamin.

== Board of directors ==
As of 2022, the group's board of directors were Jabari Brisport, Enigma founder Hicham Oudghiri, Veena Dubal, and Nina Turner.

Jacobin founder Bhaskar Sunkara was initially listed on the board as well.
