= Kennedy International School =

School in New York City

Coordinates: 40.751047°N 73.972402°W

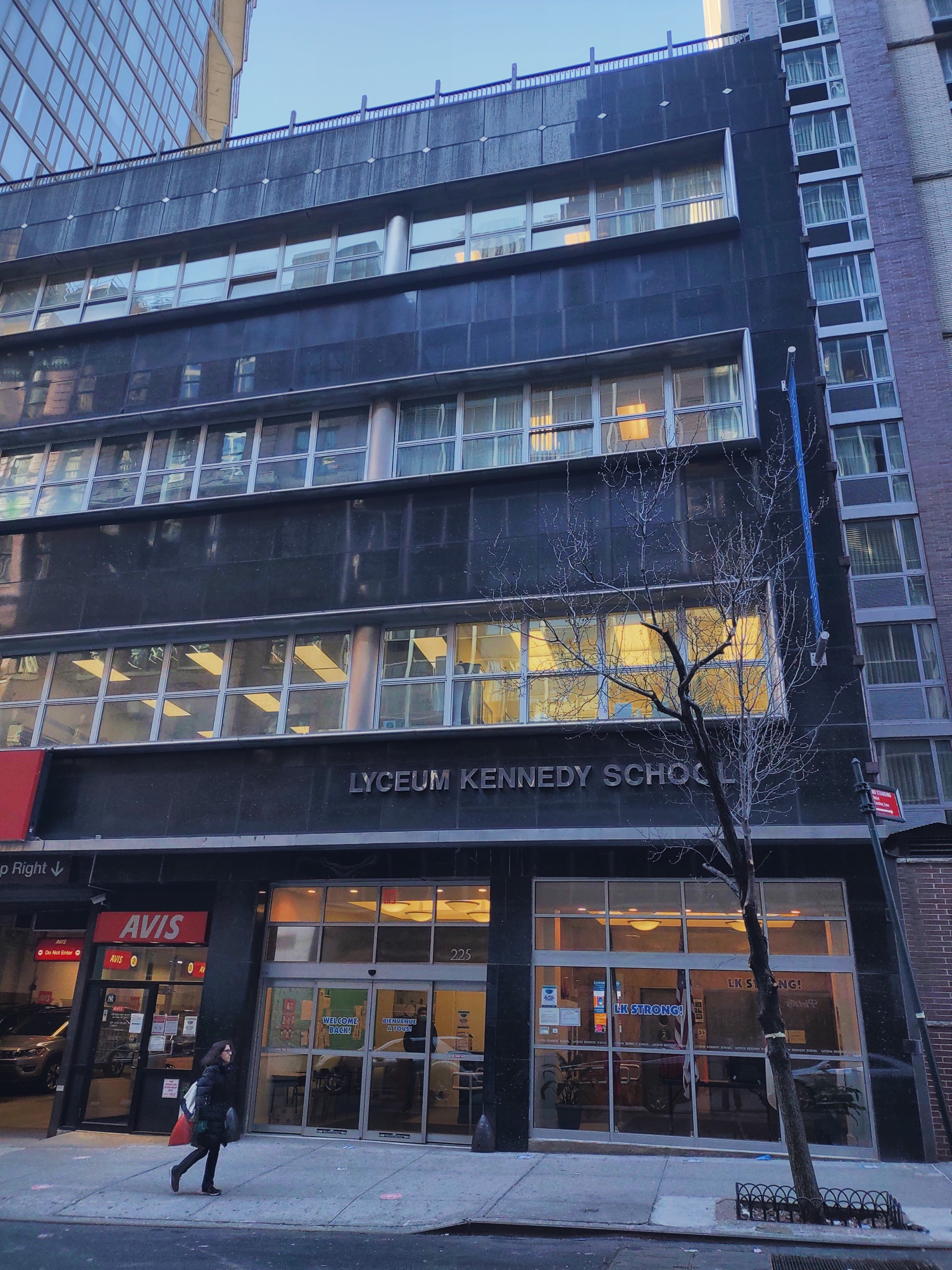
Main building at 225 East 43rd Street

Kennedy International School, formerly Lyceum Kennedy International School, is an international school occupying two buildings in Midtown Manhattan, New York City. It serves preschool through grade 12. It formerly had another campus in Ardsley, New York.

The school was named after President of the United States John F. Kennedy. Founded in 1964, Kennedy International School serves the needs of French and francophone families living in New York.

It has an English and French language Pre-Kindergarten-12 day school program, and it has a Japanese language preschool and Kindergarten program. It also had a Japanese Saturday school program.

== History ==
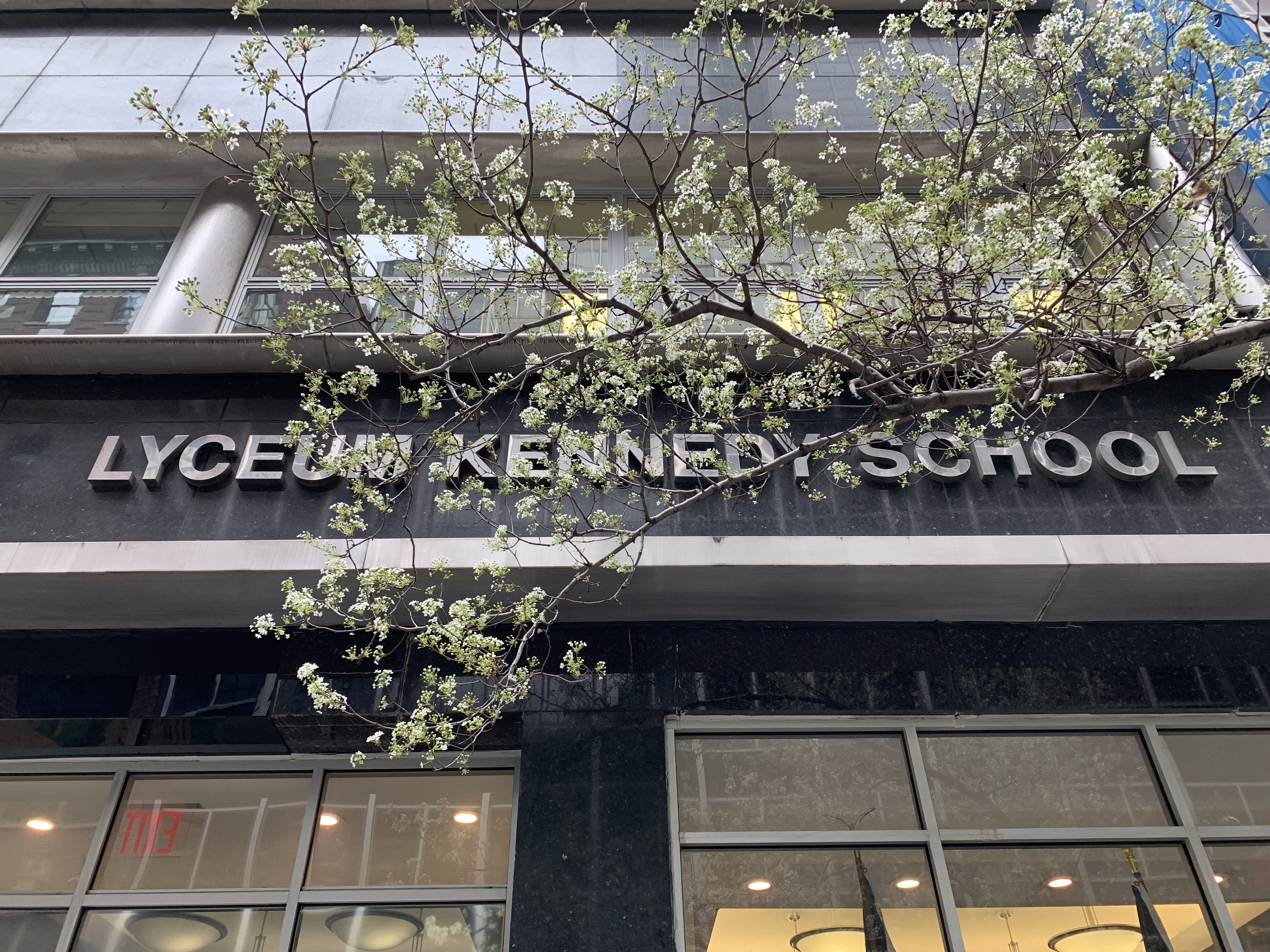
Main Campus

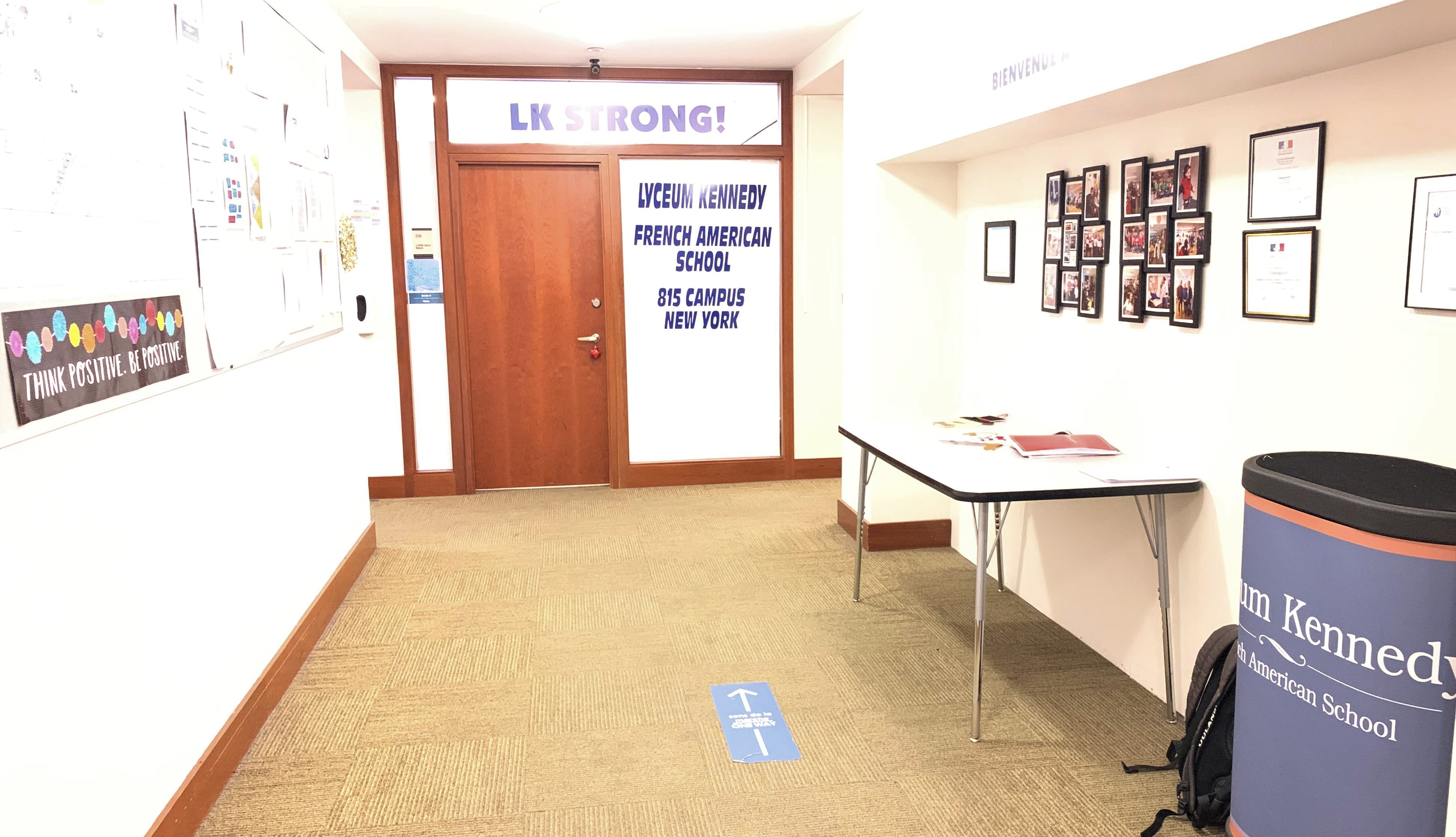
815 2nd Ave. Campus

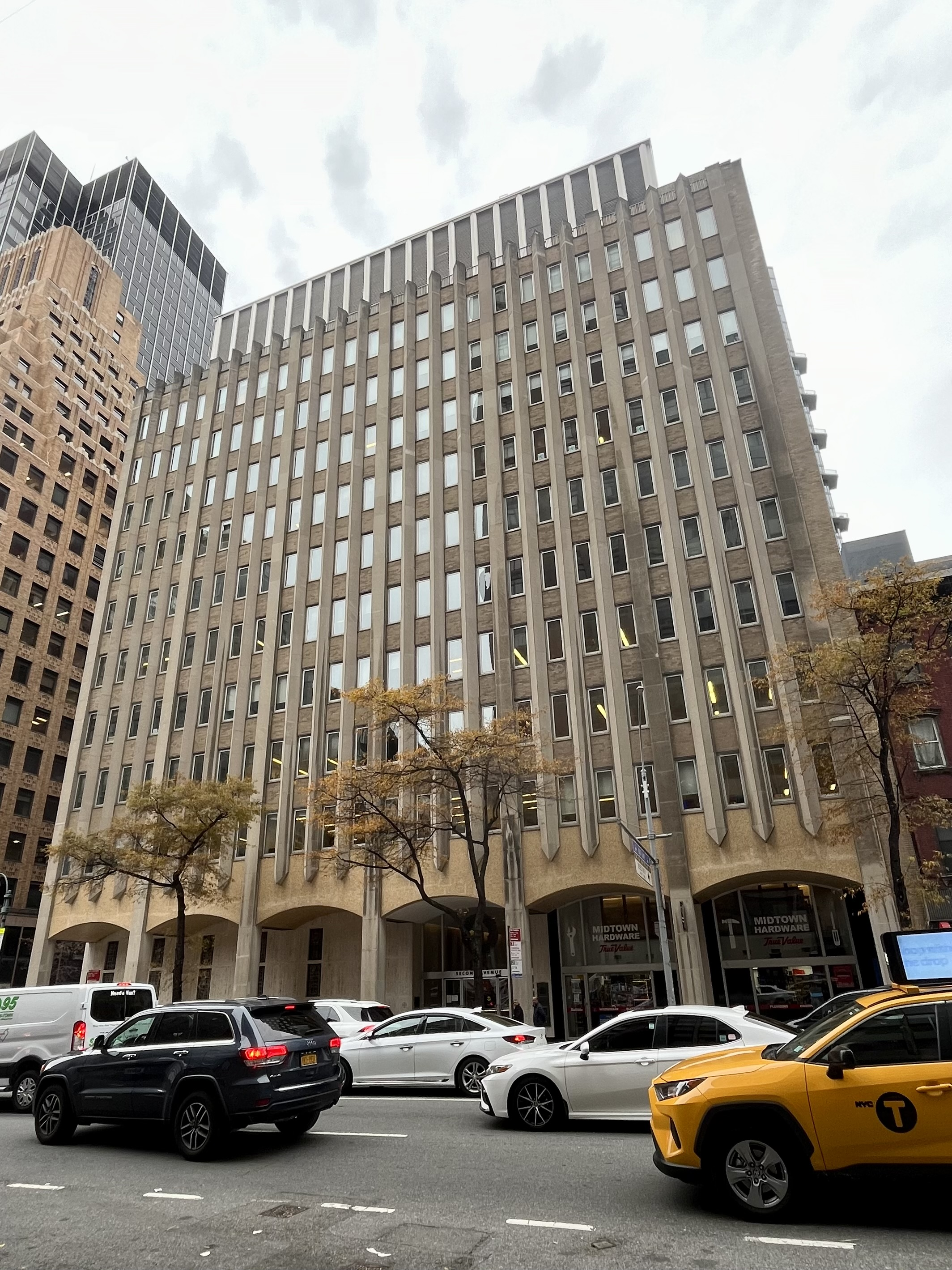
815 2nd Avenue

Éliane Dumas, a teacher at the Lycée Français de New York, established the Lyceum Kennedy French American School in 1964. Dumas established the school for French students, and the school used the New York regent standards so the students may easily move on to American schools.

A Japan-born linguist and professor named Koji Sonoda acquired the school in 1986. At that time the school began advertising to students who originated from other regions. In 1987 the school had opened its Japanese kindergarten and elementary school program in the Ardsley campus. Originally the Ardsley campus was in rented space at Concord Road Elementary School. In 1990, it began renting space in Ardsley Middle School, partly to replace some space it could no longer use at Concord Road. In 1990 it was scheduled to begin holding after school preparatory classes at Ardsley High School. The Ardsley High program had preschool and kindergarten students, and it was done to prepare Japanese national students to enter schools in Japan.

A dedicated Ardsley campus opened in 1996. The Manhattan Japanese program, with a supplementary school and a preschool, opened in 1997, and the Japanese junior high supplementary school program began in 2010. It previously had a Japanese day elementary school, but that closed in 2004. In the late 1990s, the French program was only in Manhattan.

In 2015 Lyceum Kennedy had two programs: A French-English bilingual program at both campuses, and a program for Japanese people only at the Manhattan campus. The Japanese program was previously called the Lyceum Kennedy Japanese School (リセ・ケネディ日本人学校 Rise Kenedi Nihonjin Gakkō).

In 2026, the school was evacuated when the neighboring Pfizer Building was found to be at high risk of collapse.

== Accreditation ==
Kennedy International School is accredited by the French Ministry of Education, and students at Kennedy International School can transfer easily into any French school in France.

In September 2014, Kennedy International School became an authorized International Baccalaureate school for IB Diploma Programme (). The school offers to students in 11th and 12th grades a bilingual French and English IB Diploma, with Spanish as the second language.

== Demographics ==
As of 2005, some of the parents of students at the Ardsley campus had jobs in the United Nations while others worked for corporations. In 2005 about 37% of the students from the Ardsley campus were from American families and about 21% of the students came from French families. In 2003, about 80% of the students of the Ardsley campus had at least one parent or guardian who spoke French.

As of 2011, about 33% of the school's population spoke a home language other than English and French and over 50% of the school's elementary students were non-French-speakers prior to enrolling at Kennedy International School.

== See also ==
- Agency for French Education Abroad (Agence pour l'enseignement français à l'étranger or AEFE)
- New York State Board of Regents
- International Baccalaureate
- IB Diploma Programme
- Japanese in New York City
- American School of Paris, American international school in France
- American School in Japan, American international school in Tokyo
