= South Presbyterian Church =

Historic church in New York, United States

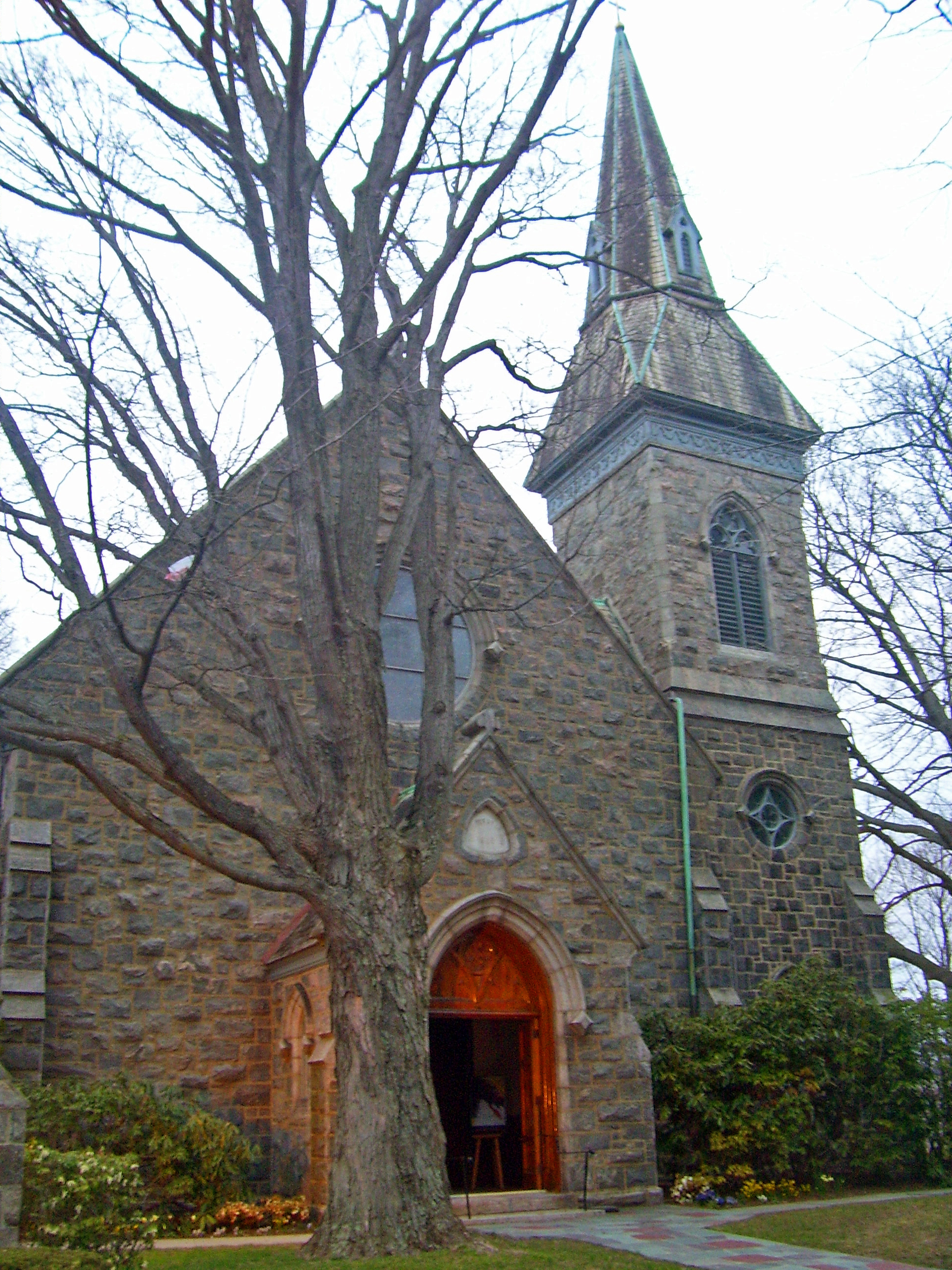
- South (front) elevation, 2008

Religion
- Affiliation: Presbyterian

Location
- Location: Dobbs Ferry, NY
- Interactive map of South Presbyterian Church
- Coordinates: 41.0148°N 73.87246°W

Architecture
- Architect: Julius Munckwitz
- Type: church
- Style: Gothic Revival
- Groundbreaking: 1868
- Completed: 1869
- Direction of façade: Southeast

U.S. National Register of Historic Places
- Added to NRHP: May 26, 2000
- NRHP Reference no.: 00000548

Website
- South Presbyterian Church

South Presbyterian Church, usually just referred to as South Church, is located along Broadway (US 9) in Dobbs Ferry, New York, United States. Founded in 1820, it is currently in its second building, a stone Gothic Revival style structure dating to 1869. Members of the church have done much of the work on both buildings, and the church itself is actively involved in the community.

The main church building is the only known extant work of architect Julius Munckwitz. Two outbuildings, a manse and a house built by a former parishioner, were built around the same time and of similar materials but show traces of the Second Empire style, such as mansard roofs. They have changed very little since they were first opened, despite the conversion of one into a day care center. All three were added to the National Register of Historic Places in 2000 as a well-preserved example of an urban Gothic Revival church.

== Buildings ==
The property has three buildings: the church, a manse and the Second Empire-style house of Robert Wilde, an early congregant and owner of the property. All three are considered contributing resources to the National Register listing. The church and Wilde's house are connected by a more modern wing which is not.

=== Church ===
The church is rectangular with a gabled nave, smaller narthex and an engaged bell tower. Its central section, faced with granite trimmed with limestone, is three bays wide by five deep. In addition to the non-contributing connecting wing, it has another one, polygonal in shape, that is original to the building although greatly modified since then.

South Presbyterian's exterior has lancet windows with wood tracery, limestone hoods and diamond-shaped bosses. The main entrance features Gothic-carved wood doors beneath a carved tympanum. The bell tower features a lancet window of its own, with four smaller tabernacle windows on its octagonal spire separated from the lower level by a wooden frieze.

Inside, the church's sanctuary features a ribbed plaster ceiling and its original pews and wainscoting. Pew number 49 is marked with a brass plaque noting its use by Theodore Roosevelt while he was vacationing in Dobbs Ferry in summer 1871. The second floor of the original wing has heavy molded plaster cornices.

=== Wilde House ===
The Wilde House dates to 1870. It is a six-by-three-bay two-story granite structure with brick window trim and a convex mansard roof. The second-story windows are also paired, separated by wood colonettes with stylized capitals. Polygonal bays flank the entrance and a stone course separates the two main stories. A wood front porch has chamfered posts and carved balusters.

Its interior has been modified for its present use as a day care center, but still retains original woodwork such as the banister on the stairway. The hearth of one of the fireplaces still has its original tiling.

=== Manse ===
The manse, designed and built in 1869 by architect George E. Harney, is likewise a granite building with a hipped roof, in its case a bracketed one topped by slate. It is two stories high and three bays square. The roof dormers have bargeboards with Gothic Revival detailing, as does the wooden porch in the rear. There is a one-story two-bay extension on the north side with a flat bracketed roof.

Some of its fenestration also uses Gothic Revival detailing. A front bay window is surrounded with decorative wood carving, and in the rear there is a lancet window in the middle of the second story.

== History ==
As a congregation, South Presbyterian Church dates to 1820. At that time Dobbs Ferry was merely a small cluster of buildings around a junction on the Albany Post Road, and there were no churches. On Sundays devout locals met in the largest building then in town, the barn on Peter Van Brugh Livingston's estate, to attend services conducted by travelling Presbyterian or Methodist ministers. Three years later, the group formally incorporated as South Presbyterian Church, to distinguish themselves from a North Presbyterian Church in the nearby hamlet of Halls Corners.

In August 1823, six congregants bought a 1-acre (4,000 m^{2}) triangle of land at the present junction of Storm Street and Ashford Road. The small church built on the property was made of local timber and painted white in the style of New England rural churches. It was known as the Little White Church for years afterwards. Today it is gone and a Lutheran church stands on the site, but the original cemetery, known as the Little White Cemetery, remains.

Two years later, in 1825, the church was officially received by the Presbytery of New York. That body censured the church six years later when discord broke out after Van Brugh Livingston, its original benefactor, tried to require that anyone joining the church sign a temperance pledge agreeing to abstain from distilled beverages. He resigned as an elder afterwards.

The church continued to grow over the next few decades, and by the 1860s it had 140 members. All agreed it was time for a new church building. James Wilde, one of the wealthier members, located and bought for the church the current property, closer to the center of the growing village, in 1864. Julius Munckowitz, an architect about whom little is known outside South Presbyterian Church save his early membership in the American Society of Architects (a predecessor to today's American Institute of Architects) and his later tenure as supervising architect of the New York City Department of Public Parks, designed the church, and the cornerstone was laid in 1868.

As with the original church, construction was done by congregants (or their businesses) using local materials. The granite was supposedly quarried and cut near the old church. Local firms also did the carpentry and masonry. Individual members donated their labor, money or both. When the new church was dedicated on the last Sunday in 1869, it had every modern convenience of the day, including gas lighting. The manse, begun that year

Wilde had originally built the stone house as a retirement home, but never used it for that purpose. He instead conveyed it to the Misses Masters, founders of the nearby Masters School. In 1916 the school turned it over to the church, which began using it as a parish hall.

The church has been improved twice with the addition of stained glass in the sanctuary lancet windows. In 1914, it was J. Gordon Guthrie, a congregant, who also did the rose window in the rear. He used as his models for the women depicted three fellow congregants. Fifty years later, in 1964, it was J.M. Baransky of nearby Yonkers who did the non-figurative pastel stained glass in the central section.

The original pipe organ was replaced in 1928, on a new balcony, by the current model, formerly in use at Manhattan's Central Presbyterian Church. The bell dates to 1876, when it was cast by the Troy foundry of Meneely & Kimberly. The connecting wing between the church and Wilde House was erected in 1954, but attempts were made to keep it architecturally sympathetic to the older buildings.

== Today ==
South Presbyterian continues an activist tradition that dates to Livingston's stand against liquor. During Reconstruction, it raised money to help freedmen in the South. The church congregation works to help the homeless and poor in New York City and Yonkers. It supports gay rights, raises money for AIDS-related causes and holds an annual Martin Luther King Jr. breakfast.

Some of its space is rented out to programs that benefit the community. One room of the church is rented to an art school for children, and the first floor of the Wilde House is home to the Days of Wonder day care center. The original connection between Wilde and the Masters School continues in one of its afterschool clubs and activities, where students volunteer at Days of Wonder.

== See also ==
- National Register of Historic Places listings in southern Westchester County, New York
