= Dobbs Ferry, New York =

- Village
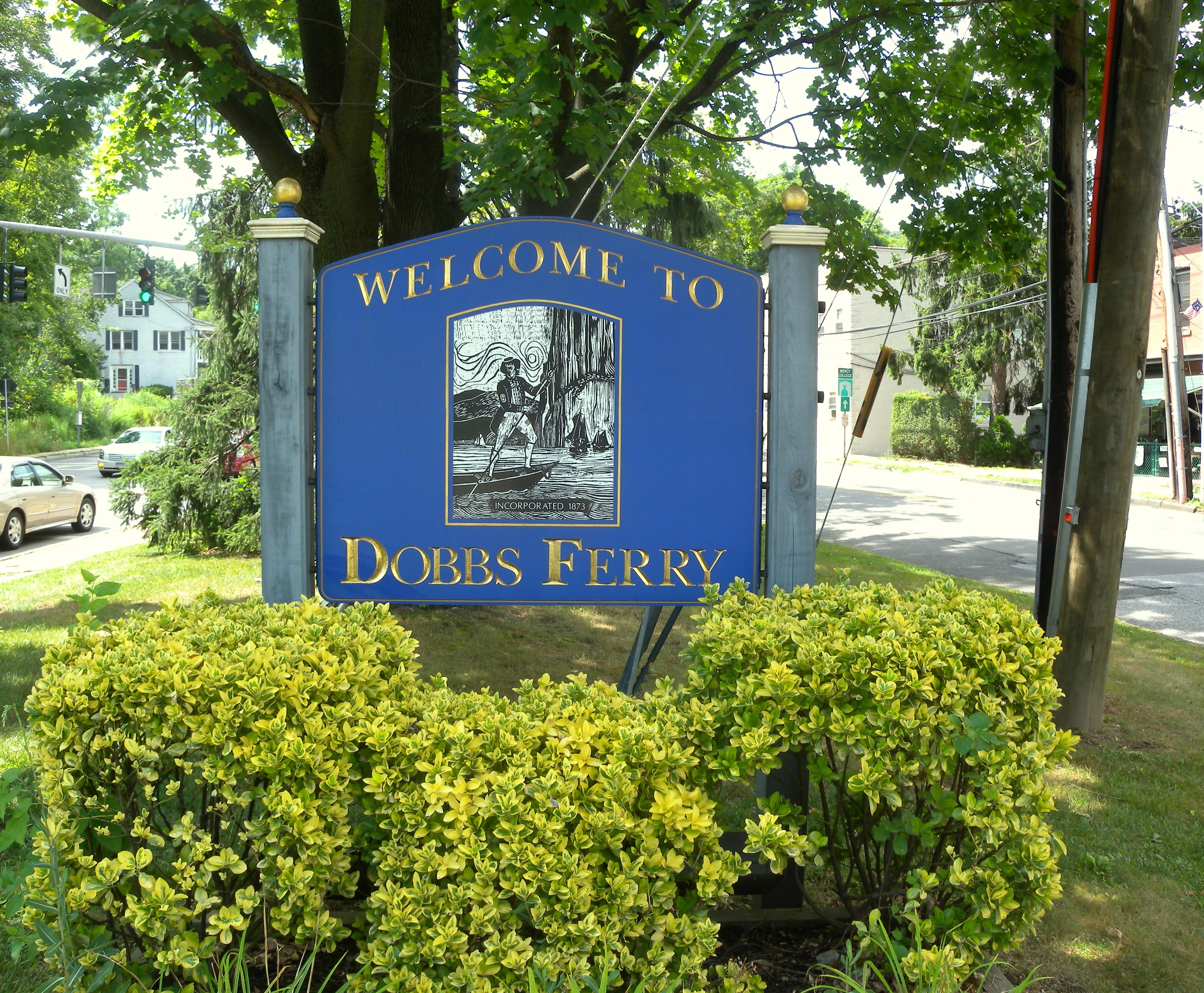
- Dobbs Ferry welcome sign

- Seal

- Location of Dobbs Ferry, New York
- Coordinates: 41°0′46″N 73°51′58″W
- Country: United States
- State: New York
- County: Westchester
- Town: Greenburgh

Area
  - Total: 3.17 sq mi (8.22 km^{2})
  - Land: 2.42 sq mi (6.27 km^{2})
  - Water: 0.75 sq mi (1.95 km^{2})
- Elevation: 210 ft (64 m)

Population (2020)
  - Total: 11,541
  - Density: 4,763.6/sq mi (1,839.25/km^{2})
- Time zone: UTC−5 (Eastern (EST))
  - Summer (DST): UTC−4 (EDT)
- ZIP Code: 10522
- Area code: 914
- FIPS code: 36-20698
- GNIS feature ID: 0970074
- Website: https://www.dobbsferry.gov/

Dobbs Ferry is a village in Westchester County, New York, United States. The population was 10,875 according to the 2010 United States census. In 2021, its population rose to an estimated 11,456. The village of Dobbs Ferry is located in, and is a part of, the town of Greenburgh. The village ZIP Code is 10522. Most of the village falls within the boundaries of the Dobbs Ferry Union Free School District.

Dobbs Ferry was ranked seventh in the list of the top 10 places to live in New York State for 2014, according to the national online real estate brokerage Movoto. Dobbs Ferry is also the first village in New York State certified as a Climate Smart Community and was granted in 2014 the highest level given out in the state.

== History ==
Multiple groups of Native Americans lived around what is now known as Dobbs Ferry since at least 4500 BC. The most recent tribe who claimed territory of the area are the Wecquaesgeek, maintaining villages until the 1600s. Numerous artifacts from the tribe continue to be found along Wicker's Creek in oyster middens.

Dobbs Ferry was named for the ferry service started in the early 1700s by John Dobbs or his son William. It was not a licensed service, so there are no official records to pin down exactly which Dobbs family member started the service or when. John was English, son of Walter Dobbs who can be found in the historical record getting a liquor license in Manhattan in 1680, leasing land on the East River to harvest salt marsh hay soon after, and serving as a constable in the Bowery Ward. John grew up in Manhattan, the nephew of the wealthy and politically prominent William Merritt, a mariner and businessman. Merritt was mayor of New York from 1695 to 1698 and co-founded Trinity Church (Anglican, now Episcopalian).

John leased the waterfront and adjoining acreage at present-day Dobbs Ferry from Frederick Phillips in 1698, when he was about 23 and single. Simultaneously his uncle William Merritt moved to a large parcel he co-owned on the opposite bank, at what was later called Snedens Landing (now Palisades, NY). It was a natural place for a ferry since it was the first spot going north from the city where the west bank was not blocked by the sheer rock cliff known as The Palisades. Merritt needed to get out of the city, because he had been an anti-Leislerite, allied with those who engineered Jacob Leisler's trial and hanging in 1691 and therefore faced a perilous future in the city when a pro-Leislerite royal governor was sent over in 1698. (An anti-Leislerite ally who stayed in the city was arrested, charged with treason and sentenced to death by the re-ascendant Leislerites, though the sentence was not carried out.)

With members of the Dobbs/Merritt clan living on both sides of the river, the ferry service probably evolved as an adjunct to intra-family crossings of the river. By 1739 ownership of the ferry service passed to Robert and Mary ("Mollie) Sneden who first rented and then bought a portion of Merritt's former holdings. Mary is believed by some to have been John's daughter Mary Dobbs. There is no proof of this, but Mary's Christening was recorded at Sleepy Hollow Church and the date matches Mary Sneden's birth year. Moreover, there is no alternative adulthood recorded for Mary Dobbs and no alternative childhood for Mary Sneden.

The ferry service continued until about 1943. Members of the Sneden and Dobbs families were involved almost throughout, including all of the 19th century and parts of the 20th century. There is a conflicting version of this history that is widely disseminated, which gives a prominent role to one Jeremiah Dobbs, but this has been debunked by recent careful research. There was a Jeremiah Dobbs among John's descendants, but there is no evidence he played any important role in the ferry.

Dobbs Ferry played a vital role in the American Revolutionary War. The position of the village opposite the northernmost end of the Palisades gave it importance during the war. The region was repeatedly raided by camp followers of each army; the British army made Dobbs Ferry a rendezvous, after the Battle of White Plains in November 1776, and the continental division under General Benjamin Lincoln was here at the end of January 1777.

Mary Sneden and all but one of her sons were Tories (Robert Sneden Senior died before the war). Patriots on the west bank ordered the Tory Snedens to cease their involvement with the ferry because they were aiding the British cause. One son, Robert Sneden, sided with the rebels and so operation and eventually ownership of the ferry fell to him.

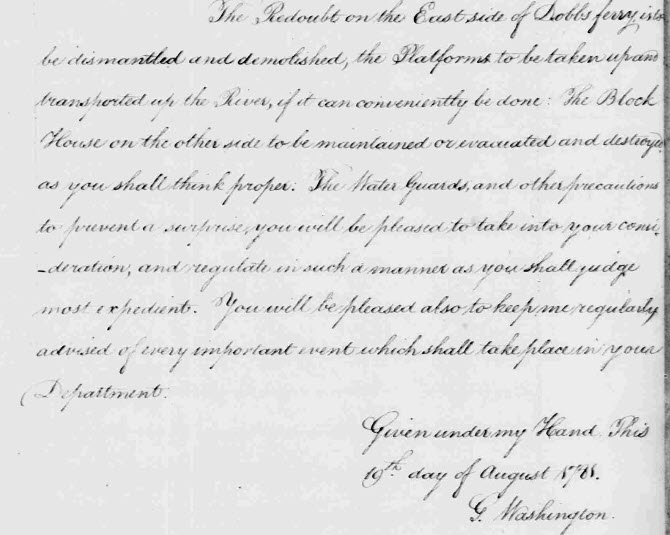
George Washington's 19 August 1781 order to dismantle fortifications at Dobbs Ferry

In July and August 1781, Continental Army troops commanded by General George Washington were encamped in Dobbs Ferry and neighboring localities, alongside allied French forces under the command of the Comte de Rochambeau. The extensive campsite that stretched for miles became known as Philipsburg Encampment as the land belonged to the massive colonial landholding, Philipsburg Manor. Earthworks and a fort, commanding the Hudson ferry, were built by the American side. A large British army controlled Manhattan at the time, and Washington chose the Dobbs Ferry area for encampment because he hoped to probe for weaknesses in the British defenses, just 12 miles (19 km) to the south. But on August 14, 1781, a communication was received from French Admiral Comte de Grasse in the West Indies, which caused Washington to change his strategy. De Grasse's communication, which advocated a joint land and sea attack against the British in Virginia, convinced Washington to risk a march of more than 400 miles (640 km) to the Chesapeake region of Virginia. Washington's new strategy, adopted and designed in mid-August 1781, at the encampment of the allied armies, would win the war. The allied armies were ordered to break camp on August 19, 1781: on that date the Americans took the first steps of their march to Virginia along present-day Ashford Avenue and Broadway, en route to victory over General Cornwallis at the Siege of Yorktown and to victory in the Revolutionary War.

The village was originally incorporated in 1873 as Greenburgh, but the name was changed to Dobbs Ferry in 1882.

The current local government of Dobbs Ferry is headed by Mayor Vincent Rossillo, a Democrat, who was elected in November 2019.

The Estherwood and Carriage House, Hyatt-Livingston House, South Presbyterian Church, and United States Post Office are listed on the National Register of Historic Places.

== Demographics ==
Historical population
Year	Pop.	±%
1880	1,915	—
1890	2,083	+8.8%
1900	2,888	+38.6%
1910	3,455	+19.6%
1920	4,401	+27.4%
1930	5,741	+30.4%
1940	5,883	+2.5%
1950	6,268	+6.5%
1960	9,260	+47.7%
1970	10,353	+11.8%
1980	10,053	−2.9%
1990	9,940	−1.1%
2000	10,622	+6.9%
2010	10,875	+2.4%
2019	11,027	+1.4%
2020	11,541	+4.7%
Sources: 1880 value is given for Greenburgh Village, 1890, 1900, 1910, 1920, 1930, 1940, 1950, 1960, 1970, 1980, 1990, 2000, 2010; Source: U.S. Decennial Census

=== 2020 census ===
As of the 2020 census, Dobbs Ferry had a population of 11,541. The median age was 41.7 years. 23.7% of residents were under the age of 18 and 17.4% of residents were 65 years of age or older. For every 100 females there were 91.5 males, and for every 100 females age 18 and over there were 85.5 males age 18 and over.

100.0% of residents lived in urban areas, while 0.0% lived in rural areas.

There were 4,277 households in Dobbs Ferry, of which 36.8% had children under the age of 18 living in them. Of all households, 55.1% were married-couple households, 13.5% were households with a male householder and no spouse or partner present, and 26.1% were households with a female householder and no spouse or partner present. About 24.4% of all households were made up of individuals and 9.9% had someone living alone who was 65 years of age or older.

There were 4,549 housing units, of which 6.0% were vacant. The homeowner vacancy rate was 1.4% and the rental vacancy rate was 5.2%.

Racial composition as of the 2020 census
Race	Number	Percent
White	8,048	69.7%
Black or African American	530	4.6%
American Indian and Alaska Native	36	0.3%
Asian	1,062	9.2%
Native Hawaiian and Other Pacific Islander	2	0.0%
Some other race	700	6.1%
Two or more races	1,163	10.1%
Hispanic or Latino (of any race)	1,703	14.8%

=== 2000 census ===
As of the census of 2000, there were 10,622 people, 3,792 households, and 2,570 families residing in the village. The population density was 4,350.0 people per square mile (1,680.8 per km^{2}). There were 3,941 housing units at an average density of 1,614.0 per square mile (623.6 per km^{2}). The racial makeup of the village was 80.70% White, 7.38% African American, 0.08% Native American, 7.56% Asian, 0.09% Pacific Islander, 1.93% from other races, and 2.26% from two or more races. Hispanic or Latino of any race were 7.00% of the population.

There were 3,792 households, out of which 34.5% had children under the age of 18 living with them, 54.8% were married couples living together, 10.0% had a female householder with no husband present, and 32.2% were non-families. Of all households, 27.6% were made up of individuals, and 8.4% had someone living alone who was 65 years of age or older. The average household size was 2.55 and the average family size was 3.13.

In the village, the population was spread out, with 26.0% under the age of 18, 7.3% from 18 to 24, 27.4% from 25 to 44, 24.1% from 45 to 64, and 15.2% who were 65 years of age or older. The median age was 39 years. For every 100 females, there were 95.7 males. For every 100 females age 18 and over, there were 84.5 males.

The median income for a household in the village was $70,333, and the median income for a family was $93,127. Males had a median income of $65,532 versus $50,091 for females. The per capita income for the village was $35,090. About 1.8% of families and 5.8% of the population were below the poverty line, including 4.8% of those under age 18 and 7.2% of those age 65 or over.

== Geography ==
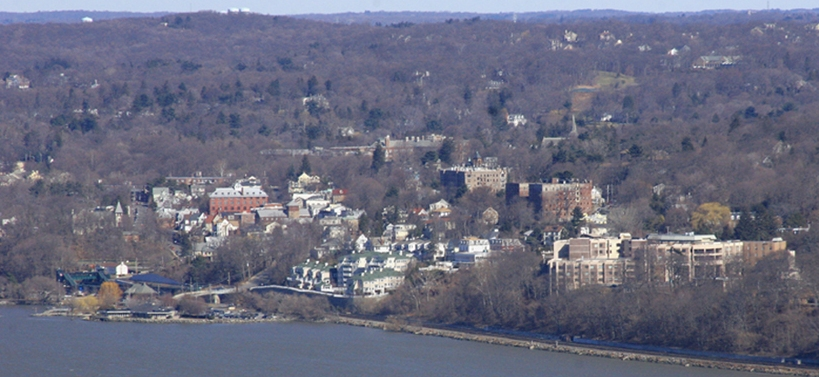
Dobbs Ferry, New York

Dobbs Ferry is located at 41°0′46″N 73°51′58″W (41.012729, −73.866026).

According to the United States Census Bureau, the village has a total area of 3.2 square miles (8.3 km^{2}), of which 2.4 square miles (6.2 km^{2}) is land and 0.7 square miles (1.8 km^{2}), or 23.03%, is water.

The village is bounded on the west by the Hudson River, and on the east by the Saw Mill River. Wickers Creek (name derived from the indigenous Weckquaesgeek) runs east to west through the center of the village from its main source in the Juhring Nature Preserve, Todd's Pond.

The village consists of a series of neighborhoods as defined in the 2010 Vision Plan, the Master Plan for the village. These neighborhoods are not popularly recognized as of 2014. As the Vision Plan states, "Sometimes the boundaries of these neighborhoods are clearly defined, but other times less so. Where necessary, boundaries have been interpolated." The neighborhoods are: Springhurst Park, Broadway, Wickers Creek, Waterfront, Old Town, Fairmead, Riverview Manor, Villard, Osborne, Belden, Maple, Walgrove, Virginia, Beacon Hill, Campuses and Woods, Parkway, Southfield, Knoll, Northfield, and Juhring. (Homes in Juhring are commonly referred to by real estate brokers as part of the Ardsley Park neighborhood, which encompasses the Juhring neighborhood in Dobbs Ferry and the Ardsley-on-Hudson neighborhood of Irvington, New York).

== Climate ==
Climate data for Dobbs Ferry, New York
Month	Jan	Feb	Mar	Apr	May	Jun	Jul	Aug	Sep	Oct	Nov	Dec	Year
Record high °F (°C)	73 (23)	75 (24)	86 (30)	96 (36)	97 (36)	99 (37)	104 (40)	102 (39)	101 (38)	89 (32)	82 (28)	77 (25)	104 (40)
Mean daily maximum °F (°C)	38.1 (3.4)	41.4 (5.2)	50.5 (10.3)	61.9 (16.6)	72.5 (22.5)	80.4 (26.9)	85.4 (29.7)	83.4 (28.6)	75.8 (24.3)	64.7 (18.2)	53.6 (12.0)	42.8 (6.0)	62.5 (17.0)
Mean daily minimum °F (°C)	23.0 (−5.0)	24.5 (−4.2)	31.7 (−0.2)	40.4 (4.7)	50.3 (10.2)	59.3 (15.2)	64.7 (18.2)	63.6 (17.6)	56.3 (13.5)	45.3 (7.4)	37.1 (2.8)	28.1 (−2.2)	43.7 (6.5)
Record low °F (°C)	−10 (−23)	−5 (−21)	2 (−17)	17 (−8)	29 (−2)	38 (3)	49 (9)	44 (7)	34 (1)	27 (−3)	12 (−11)	−4 (−20)	−10 (−23)
Average precipitation inches (mm)	4.39 (112)	3.35 (85)	4.54 (115)	4.50 (114)	4.87 (124)	3.88 (99)	4.57 (116)	4.38 (111)	4.77 (121)	4.11 (104)	4.52 (115)	4.27 (108)	52.15 (1,325)
Average snowfall inches (cm)	10.1 (26)	8.9 (23)	5.2 (13)	.9 (2.3)	trace	0 (0)	0 (0)	0 (0)	0 (0)	.1 (0.25)	.8 (2.0)	4.3 (11)	30.3 (77)
Average precipitation days	11.4	9.8	11.7	12.1	12.4	11.6	10.7	10.0	9.4	8.7	10.4	11.9	130.1
Average snowy days	5.9	4.8	3.2	.4	0	0	0	0	0	.1	.8	3.5	18.7
Source: NOAA (1971–2000)

== Education ==
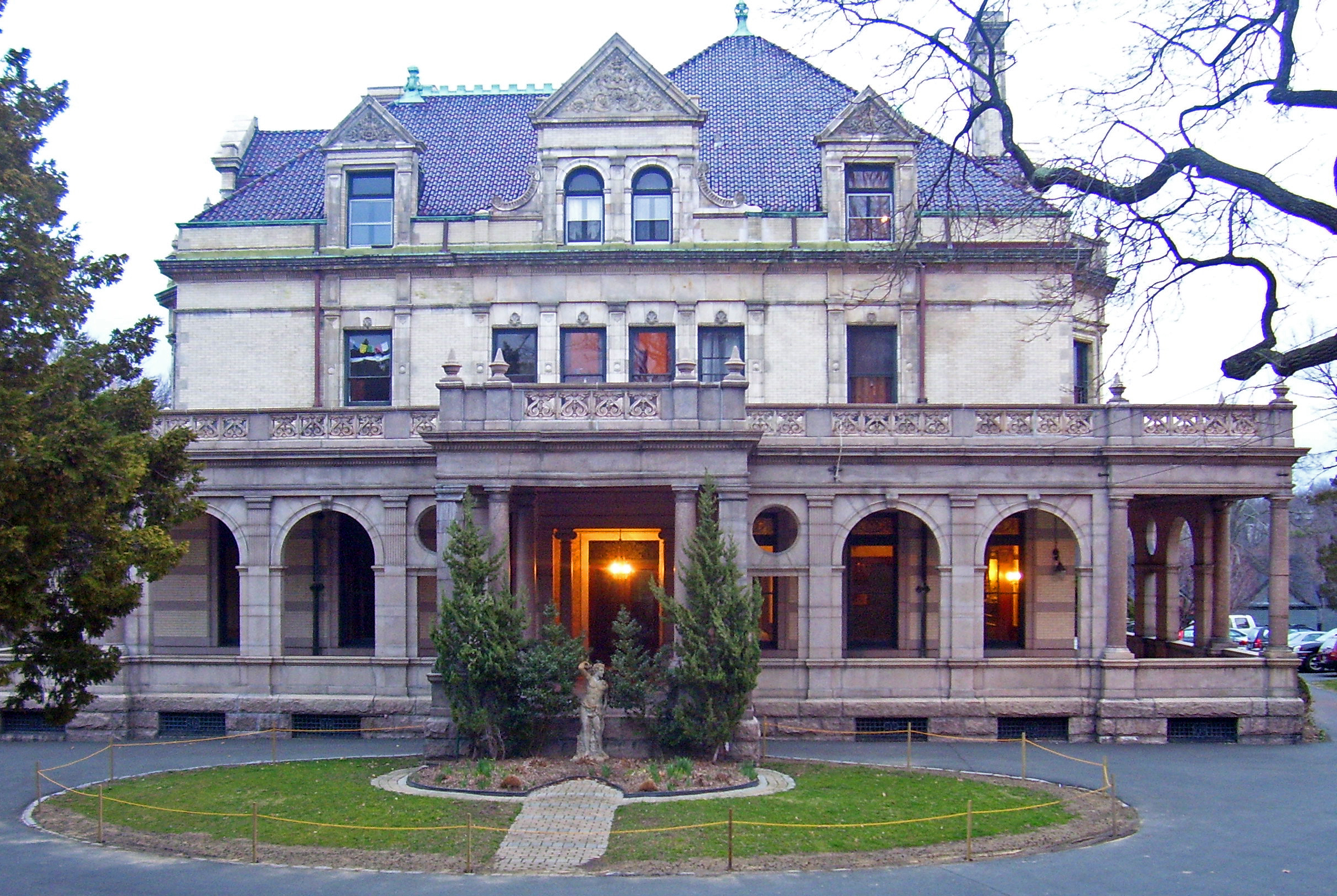
Estherwood, Masters School, Dobbs Ferry is listed on the National Register of Historic Places

A majority of the village is within the Dobbs Ferry Union Free School District, which consists of Springhurst Elementary, grades K–5, Dobbs Ferry Middle School, grades 6–8, and the Dobbs Ferry High School, grades 9–12.

Other parts of Dobbs Ferry are in Ardsley Union Free School District.

Mercy University, a private institution with undergraduate and graduate programs, has its main campus in Dobbs Ferry. Our Lady of Victory Academy, a local parochial school offering grades 9–12 for girls, was located on the campus of Mercy College until its closing in 2011.

The Masters School is a private school located south of the town center that offers grades 5–12 for boys and girls. It is a boarding or day school that was founded in 1877 by Eliza Masters. The school contains a mansion called Estherwood.

An Alcott Montessori School is located in the town.

== Public transit ==
Almost 10% of households do not own a car and rely on public transit, bicycling, and walking.

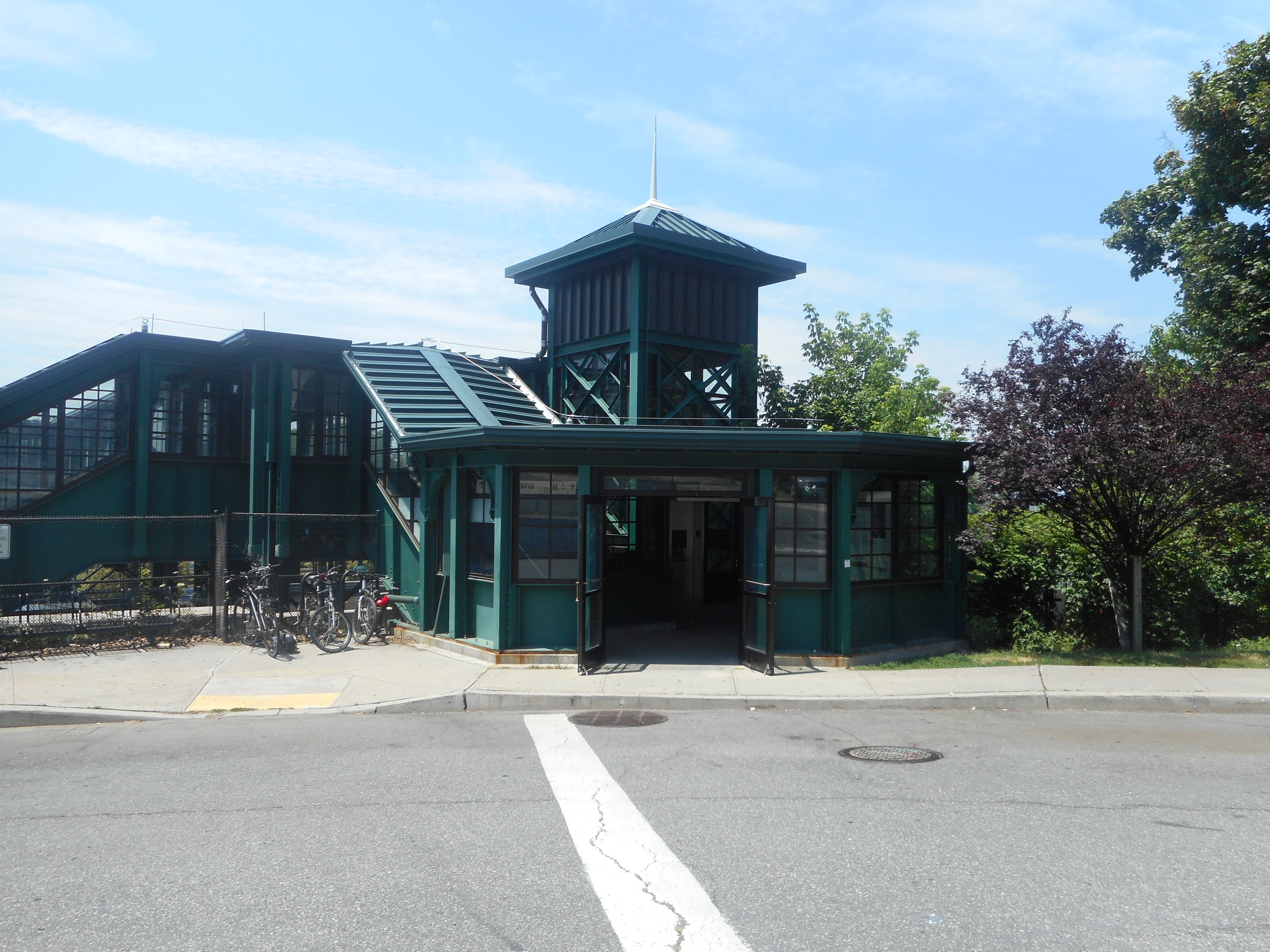
Dobbs Ferry station pedestrian bridge from Station Plaza at Palisades Street.

Several lines of the Bee-Line Bus System run through Dobbs Ferry, facilitating north-south travel along the Broadway/Route 9 corridor and east-west along Ashford Avenue. The village operates a shuttle bus from the train station in the afternoon and evenings.

Commuter rail service to Grand Central Terminal is available via the Dobbs Ferry station, served by Metro-North Railroad. The train runs on the Hudson Line, and travel time from Dobbs Ferry to Grand Central Terminal is approximately 37 minutes on an express train and 43 minutes on a local train. Many Metro North riders connect to the New York City Subway's 1 train at Marble Hill to reach destinations on the west side of Manhattan, or at Harlem–125th Street station for the Upper East Side.

Amtrak inter-city rail trains travel on the Hudson Line tracks, but trains do not stop in the village. The closest Amtrak stations are Yonkers and Croton–Harmon stations.

== Culture ==
In 2018 Brooke Lea Foster of The New York Times stated that it was one of several "Rivertowns" in New York State, which she described as among the "least suburban of suburbs, each one celebrated by buyers there for its culture and hip factor, as much as the housing stock and sophisticated post-city life." Of those, Foster stated that Dobbs Ferry had the most ethnic/cultural diversity.

=== Parks and recreation ===
The village's Recreation Department runs a variety of programs out of the Embassy Community Center, including art and dance classes, sports leagues, summer camp, and other activities open to the public. Programs for older adults are also well-funded and used. Additional sports leagues for baseball and soccer are run independently but use village facilities.

There are a variety of village public parks, in order of size:

- Juhring Nature Preserve, a 76-acre wooded park with trail entrances from the Ardsley Park (Juhring), Northfield, and Knoll neighborhoods in Dobbs Ferry.
- Waterfront Park on the Hudson River shoreline with playground, soccer field, and open space. It serves as the site of the Dobbs Ferry Union Free School District graduation ceremony, summer concerts, and Independence Day fireworks.
- Gould Park, a gift of wealthy resident Jay Gould, in the center of the Village, with a public swimming pool, playground, basketball court, and multi-sport ballfields.
- Memorial Park has a wading pool, baseball field, basketball court, and bocce court. In 2014, the American Legion Post 148, which leased space in the park, collapsed and was razed.
- Chauncey Park along the Saw Mill River

Two linear parks used for active transportation and recreation traverse Dobbs Ferry as well. The Old Croton Aqueduct Trailway, a linear State Park, runs north-south through the village on its western side. The South County Trailway, a linear Westchester County park also runs north-south through the village, but on its eastern side along the bank of the Saw Mill River. There are also segments of trails unconnected to each other, including the Gateway Trail near Estherwood Avenue and Spoiler's Run near Belden Avenue.

== Emergency services ==
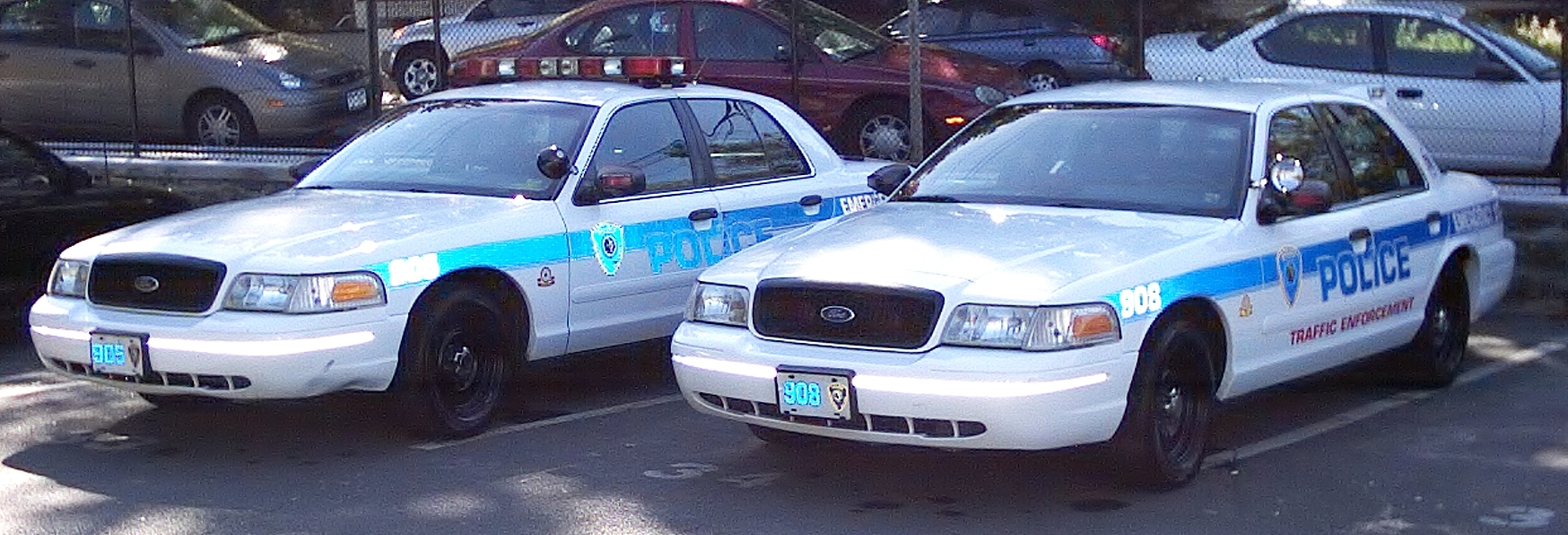
Dobbs Ferry police cars, 2006

Dobbs Ferry is served by a paid police department, a volunteer fire department (housing three pumpers and one tower ladder in two firehouses) and a volunteer ambulance corps (possessing two ambulances (one equipped with four-wheel-drive) and a fire rehab unit). As a part of the Town of Greenburgh, the village is eligible for additional coverage from the town services. Mutual aid agreements exist with neighboring municipalities for further coverage.

== Notable people ==
- Jace Alexander, actor
- Jane Alexander, actress
- Maury Allen, author, sportswriter, and journalist
- Jacob M. Appel, novelist, essayist
- Rex Beach, novelist, playwright, and Olympic water polo player, whose most famous novel is commemorated by the Spoiler's Run walking/bike trail.
- Mark Blount, NBA basketball player
- Jason Blum, film producer
- Bradley Bolke (1925–2019), voice actor
- Nicolas Checa, chess grandmaster
- William C. Conner (1920–2009), federal judge for the United States District Court for the Southern District of New York
- Augusta Dabney (1918–2008), actress
- Alvin Dark (1922–2014), Major League Baseball player and manager
- Cyrus West Field, inventor of electromagnetic trans-Atlantic telecommunication
- Paul Fix (1901–1983), film and television character actor
- Jean Fritz, author
- Max Greenfield, actor
- Bernice Gottlieb, pioneer in trans-racial adoption movement
- Elin Hilderbrand, American writer who briefly worked for the Dobbs Ferry School District
- Edwin Gould, early 20th century railroad executive and son of robber baron Jay Gould
- Keith Hernandez, retired MLB player, played for NY Mets
- Lewis Hine (1874–1940), sociologist and photographer
- Joel Higgins, actor
- Robert G. Ingersoll (1833–1899), lawyer, politician, orator, advocate of agnosticism
- J. Howard Kitching, Civil War brevet Brigadier General
- Eric Paschall, NBA basketball player
- Sarah Jessica Parker, actress
- Stone Phillips (born 1954), former co-anchor of Dateline NBC
- Dusty Rhodes, baseball player, member of 1954 World Series champion New York Giants
- James Henry Salisbury, M.D. (1823–1905) 19th-century American physician, and the inventor of the Salisbury steak.
- Charles Sheeler (1883–1965), artist and photographer
- Fanny Garrison Villard (1844–1928), co-founder of the NAACP, and leader of women's suffrage movement
- Henry Villard (1835–1900), journalist, newspaper publisher, financier and railroad baron.
- Mark Zuckerberg, co-founder of Facebook
- Randi Zuckerberg, Marketing Director of Facebook
- Rudolf Flesch (1911–1986), Authority on Literacy
