= Masters School =

Prep school in Dobbs Ferry, New York, US

The Masters School

Location
- 49 Clinton Ave; Dobbs Ferry, New York; United States; 41.010943°N 73.870451°W

Information
- Type: Private, boarding
- Motto: Do It With Thy Might
- Established: 1877
- Founder: Eliza B. Masters
- Chairman: Beth Nolan
- Head of school: Laura Danforth
- Teaching staff: 109
- Grades: 5-12
- Enrollment: Upper School: 542; Middle School: 161
- International students: 20%
- Average class size: 14
- Student to teacher ratio: 8:1
- Campus: 96 acres (390,000 m^{2})
- Colors: Purple, White
- Athletics conference: New York State Association of Independent Schools (NYSAIS), Fairchester Athletic Association (FAA), ISFL (fencing)
- Mascot: Panther
- Rival: Hackley School, Horace Mann School
- Newspaper: Tower
- Yearbook: Masterpieces
- Endowment: $98 million
- Tuition: 7-Day Boarding: $83,350; 5-Day Boarding: $77,200; Day (Middle & Upper): $65,800
- Website: mastersny.org

The Masters School (colloquially known as Masters), is a private, coeducational boarding school and day college preparatory school located in Dobbs Ferry, New York. Its 96-acre (390,000 m^{2}) campus is located north of New York City in the Hudson Valley in Westchester County. It was founded as an all-girls private school in 1877 by Eliza Bailey Masters, and first admitted boys in 1996.

== History ==
=== Early history ===
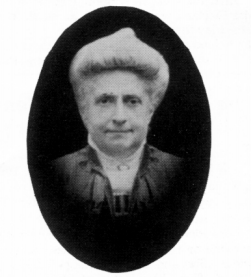
Eliza B. Masters, the school's founder and namesake, in 1889

The school was founded in 1877 by Eliza Bailey Masters as the "Misses Masters' Boarding and Day School for Young Ladies and Children." Eliza Masters, known as "Miss Lizzie" by her students had been born in 1845 to a devout Methodist family. Never married, she was inspired by the loss of her brother, the teacher Jeremiah Wilbur Masters, to typhoid fever to start the school. Following her father's death in 1874, Eliza Masters founded the school at Wilde House, also called Kirk Knoll, near the school's present-day location. James Jennings McComb, a cotton magnate and philanthropist, moved to Dobbs Ferry in the 1880s to be closer to his children. He purchased a 23-acre parcel close to Wilde House from one Dr. Ryder, and commissioned a mansion, called Estherwood in honor of his second wife, Esther Wood, on it. (The mansion was completed in 1891.) At the time, the school, which had a burgeoning student body, was considering move to Irvington to the estate of Cyrus West Field. McComb convinced Eliza Masters to stay in Dobbs Ferry by purchasing 11 acres south of Estherwood, building First and Second Houses on them in 1883, and leasing them to the school for a nominal rent. The school's faculty and 75 students moved to McComb's estate in the fall of 1883. In 1888, McComb built a Third House as a school building with an assembly hall, classrooms, a gym, a studio, and a laboratory. A Fourth House, devoted to the study of domestic science, was constructed in 1891. After McComb's death in 1901, Eliza Masters purchased his estate for the equivalent of $12 million.

After Eliza Master's death in 1921, her sister, Sarah Wilbur Masters, succeeded her as headmistress, serving alongside Mary Comstock Strong. The School was incorporated in 1911 and Masters Hall, designed by Ralph Adams Cram, was completed in 1921. Many of the school's clubs, including the Missionary Society (today known as MISH), the Dobbs Athletic Association, Glee Club, and Phoenix (the school's acting society), came about during the early 20th century.

The school taught English, French, Latin, music, art, the Bible, moral philosophy, astronomy, botany, mathematics, domestic science, and etiquette. While it was secular, Masters had a religious tone; it catered exclusively to female students.

The finishing school had a series of unusual rules that has since been removed from the school's handbook. One of the most famous rules is that the students were expected to eat bananas with knives and forks. One account even states that the girls were expected to submit weekly diaries of their bowel movements, but that their entries were mainly fictional. The school's loosely Puritanical ideology is also apparent in the school's old regulations. According to Aimee MacRae's account of her brief time at the school, a distance between men in the town and schoolgirls was expected by Miss Masters, "Never sit on the same sofa with a man; the devil sits between you."

=== Later years ===
In 1996, due to under-enrollment, the school became co-educational, opening itself to male students for the first time.

== Student body ==
The Masters School has over 670 students in grades 5–12. The school is co-educational. As of February 2020, Masters students come from 20 states and over 30 countries. In addition, up to eighty students are international.

== Faculty ==
Over 70% of the faculty have advanced degrees. The average class size is 14 students.

== Campus ==
The school's wooded 96-acre campus is on a hilltop in Dobbs Ferry, a village on the Hudson River.

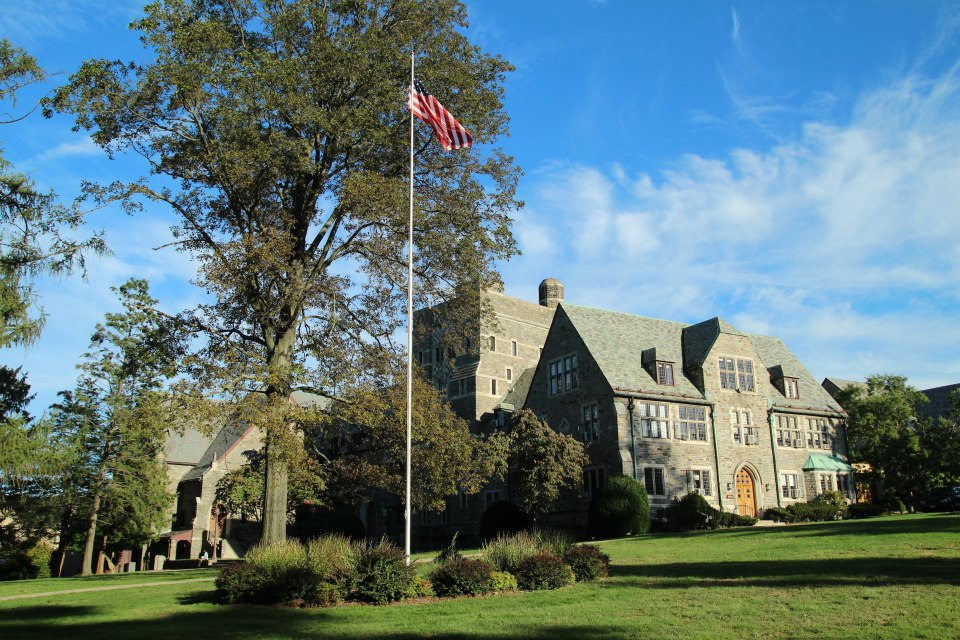
Masters Hall, the main campus building

The school has two dormitories for boys and three dormitories for girls.

The campus includes Estherwood, a late 19th-century mansion that is the only châteauesque building in Westchester County. It and its carriage house are listed on the National Register of Historic Places.

=== Facilities ===
- Masters Hall, which dates back to 1921, was renovated in 1972 following a fire and again in 2005. It holds a library, classrooms and a lecture hall.
- Morris Hall is the school's science and technology center.
- Claudia Boettcher Theater is a 450-seat theater.
- The Maureen Fonseca Center for Athletics and Arts is named for former head of school Maureen Fonseca, and opened in the fall of 2015. It has a fencing salon, swimming pool, squash courts, gymnasium, basketball and volleyball courts, art gallery, theater, recital hall and rehearsal spaces.

== Athletics ==
The school offers the following sports each season:

Fall

- Cross-country
- Soccer
- Field hockey
- Volleyball
- Tennis

Winter

- Basketball
- Fencing (epee, foil, and sabre)
- Indoor track
- Squash
- Swimming

Spring

- Lacrosse
- Baseball
- Tennis
- Golf
- Track and field

== Academics and curriculum ==
The minimum course load each year includes five major courses. Graduation requirements include four years of English, three years of a foreign language, three years of mathematics (through at least precalculus), three years of science, three years of history (including U.S. history), religion (a semester major course), 9th Grade Seminar, 11th Grade Health/Public Speaking, 1.5 years (3 semesters) of performing or visual art, three seasons of a team sport, and P.E. (as mandated by the NYS board of Education).

The school offers honors sections in the sciences, mathematics, and languages. Advanced Placement courses are offered in all of the academic departments.

Nearly all classes at Masters are designed around the Harkness method, a discussion-based teaching method designed to encourage active participation in education, and help students develop listening and speaking skills. To facilitate this method, all classrooms are fitted with a large oval Harkness table. All of the tables have pull-out leaves built into the table for administering exams.

Tower is the award-winning student newspaper of The Masters School. It is published approximately seven times a year on print as well as online. Their most notable achievements include sweeping the high school first place awards at the 2023 New York Press Association Spring Conference (including Best High School Newspaper and Best High School News Site), as well as several Columbia Scholastic Press Association silver crown and gold medals, and various individual and staff awards from the National Scholastic Press Association. Their students have won New York State Journalist of the Year three times among other awards.

== Notable programmes ==
Dobbs 16 competes at the National Championship of High School A Cappella in Allendale, New Jersey

=== Theatre ===
The Masters Department of Performing Arts (DoPA) stages multiple productions each year, involving 20% of the upper school: one or two plays in the fall; an experimental play, a full musical, and a musical revue in the winter; student-directed, student-written one-act plays as well as an outdoor Shakespeare production in the spring. The performance year begins with "Polyglot," a student-directed talent show where all performers and hosts may present in any language other than English, and ends with "The Festival of New Works," where students from the playwrighting class watch their 10 minute plays performed by the Advanced Acting classes. Masters is a member of the International Thespian Society, chapter 11265.

=== Music ===
The music program offers classes and private lessons during the school day, one of the most popular being the school's chorus, known as Glee Club. Smaller A Capella groups are also popular. Students may participate in any of three groups: The Naturals, an all-male group; Dohters, all-female; and Dobbs 16, a coed group. Dobbs 16 has won competitions including the Northeast regional of the National Championship of High School A Capella 2005. The group toured China in the spring of 2008 and went on The Tyra Banks Show in fall 2009. The host of instrumental and vocal groups includes a community orchestra and a jazz ensemble, plus bands and combos that offer opportunities for musical expression.

=== Dance ===
The dance program offers classes during the day and three audition-only dance companies. Muse and Urban Connection perform modern/ballet and hip-hop, respectively. The school also contains audition-based dance clubs, including K-Pop Cover Dance Club (KODE). The Masters School Dance Company performs twice a year.

=== Innovation and Entrepreneurship Center (IEC) ===
The IEC (as it is often referred to) offers a four-year integrated engineering/computer science program consisting of Introduction to Engineering Design, Principles of Engineering, AP Computer Science Principles, and AP Computer Science Applications. These programs give the student the opportunity to earn college credit from PLTW/Rochester Institute of Technology and The College Board. The department also offers Design Thinking and Social Entrepreneurship where students learn business skills with a focus on creative design. Zetetics, the after school program of the IEC consists of:
- History Bowl
- Engineering and Robotics
- Mathematical Modeling
- Computer Science
- Cybersecurity Team

All programs within Zetetics are highly regarded in their respective leagues and have won many awards.

== Notable alumni and faculty ==
Alumni:

- Hazel, Lady Lavery – artist, second wife of Irish painter Sir John Lavery
- Marin Alsop – conductor
- Michele Roberts – lawyer and President of National Basketball Players Association
- David Gelb – director
- Neltje Blanchan – scientific historian
- Alex Coffey – sportswriter
- Sam Coffey – professional soccer player, 2024 Olympic Gold Medalist
- Kara DioGuardi – singer-songwriter
- Martha F. Gerry – heiress
- Alex Pall – member of The Chainsmokers
- Betsy Gotbaum – former New York City Public Advocate
- Mary Lea Johnson Richards – Johnson & Johnson heiress
- Nancy Kissinger – wife of former U.S. Secretary of State Henry Kissinger
- Marie-Chantal, Crown Princess of Greece – Crown Princess of Greece and Denmark
- Suzanne Paxton – 1996 Olympic foil fencer
- Susan Cheever – author
- Sally Kirkland-Oscar nominated and Golden Globe winning actress
- Victoria Fuller – artist and sculptor
- Jill Krementz – photographer
- Marie Jenney Howe – suffragist and feminist
- Margaret Storrs Grierson – archivist and philosophy professor
- Helen Kirkpatrick – war correspondent during Second World War
- Alice Pearce – actress
- Ruth Rowland Nichols – aviator
- Edith Chapin – NPR National News Editor
- Elizabeth Post – etiquette writer
- Mary Jayne Gold – heiress and humanitarian
- Mary Scranton – former First Lady of Pennsylvania (1963–1967)
- Ruth Hanna McCormick – U.S. Representative from Illinois, 1929–1931
- Jay Washington – Filipino-American professional basketball player in Philippine Basketball Association
- Carey Winfrey – former editor-in-chief of Cuisine, American Health and Smithsonian magazines
- Ilyasah Shabazz – motivational speaker and daughter of Malcolm X
- Tippy Walker – actress
- Flynn Berry – author
- Rachel Rose (artist) – artist
- Paget Brewster – actress
- Henry Williams – political activist, chief of staff of the Mike Gravel 2020 presidential campaign
- David Oks – political activist, manager of the Mike Gravel 2020 presidential campaign
- Virginia Wright – prominent art collector, philanthropist in the Pacific Northwest
- Eleanor Torrey West – preservationist
- Raffaël Enault – French writer and film director
- Nia DaCosta - filmmaker
- Francesca Scorsese - actress and filmmaker

Faculty:

- Grete Sultan – pianist (former)
- Gwendolyn Bradley – soprano
- Jessica Boevers – stage actress
