= Flynn Berry =

American writer

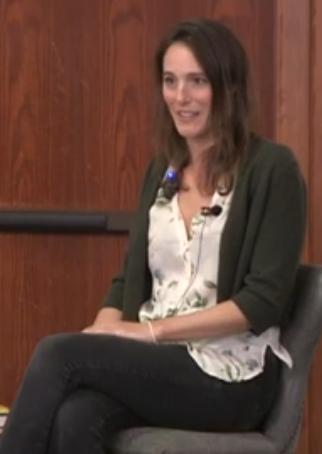
- In a 2024 video for Woodstock Community Television
- Education: Brown University
- Occupation: Writer

Flynn Berry is an American writer. She is most widely known for her book Under the Harrow.

== Early life ==
Berry attended The Masters School before matriculating to Brown University. She then studied writing at the Michener Center for Writers.

== Career ==
In 2016, Berry published Under the Harrow, a mystery novel about a woman's murder in a sleepy English town and the effects of the murder upon her sister. The book received universally positive reviews. It also won the 2017 Edgar Award for Best First Novel. In 2018, Berry published A Double Life based on the murder of Sandra Rivett and the subsequent disappearance of Lord Lucan. In 2021, Berry published Northern Spyand in 2024, its sequel, Trust Her. Her fifth novel, A Good Man on a Dark Night, is forthcoming in January 2027 from Viking.

== Books ==
- Under the Harrow. Penguin Books. 2016.
- A Double Life. Viking. 2018.
- Northern Spy: A Novel. Viking. 2021.
- Trust Her. Viking. 2024.
