= Gil Parris =

American guitarist (born 1977)

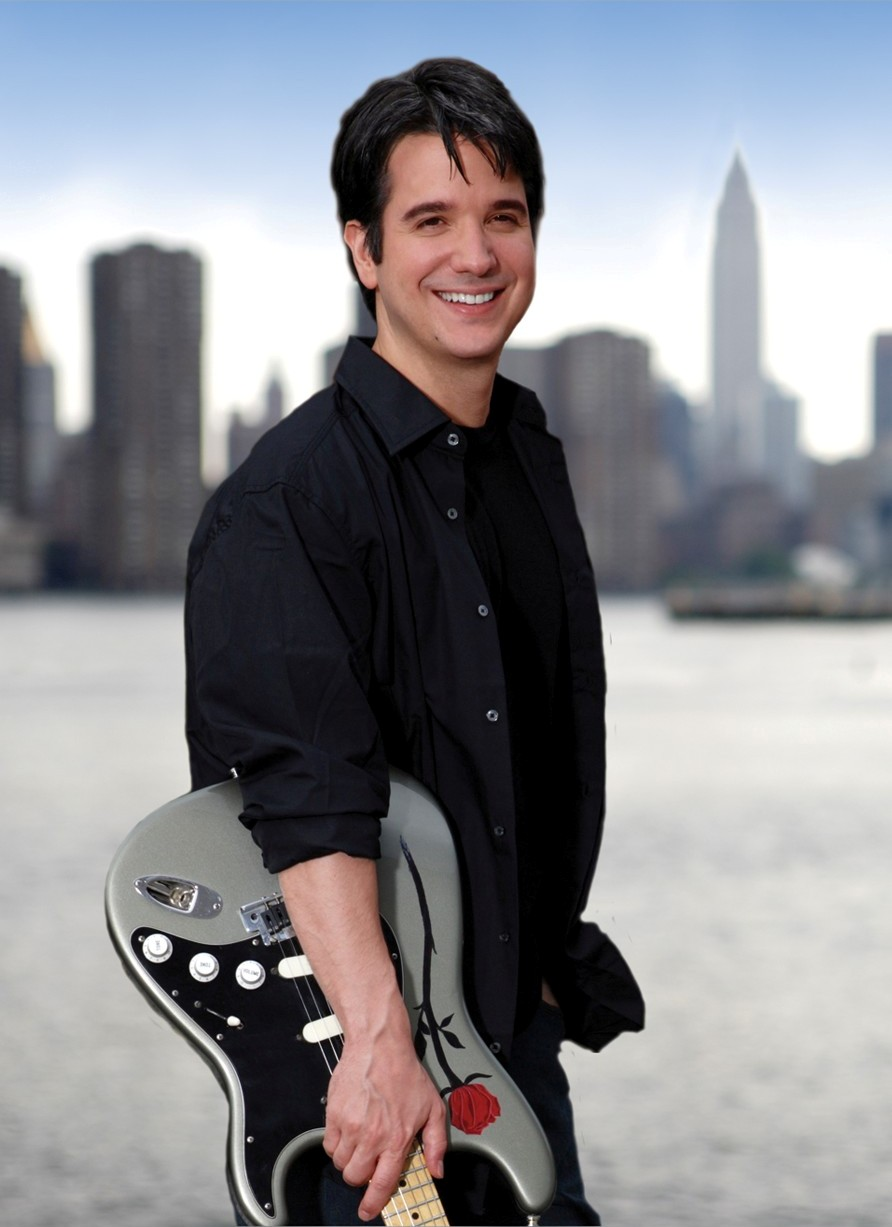
- Gil Parris

Background information
- Born: December 28, 1968 (age 57); The Bronx, New York City, New York
- Genres: Rock, jazz, blues, pop
- Occupation: Musician
- Instrument: guitar
- Years active: 1977-present
- Website: reverendguitars.com/guitars/gil-parris-signature-gps/

Gil Parris (born 1968) is an American Grammy-nominated rock, blues, jazz and pop guitarist. He graduated from Ardsley High School in 1986. After briefly attending the Berklee School of Music, Parris left to tour Europe as part of a musical troupe performing Jesus Christ Superstar before becoming a recording artist. Parris has released six solo albums and played collaboratively with over 20 other groups/artists. Parris is known for his blending of blues, jazz, rock and smooth jazz in his work. He has recorded and toured both as a solo artist and as a sideman with major artists including Dr. John, Blood, Sweat & Tears, Diane Schuur, David Mann, and Bobby Caldwell.

== Discography ==
=== Solo releases ===
- Gil Parris - 1998
- Blue Thumb - 2002
- Jam This -2003
- Live at the Next Door Cafe - 2005
- Strength - 2006
- Gil Parris and Friends Live DVD - 2007
- A Certain Beauty - 2009

=== Collaborations ===
- Syndicate of Soul - Who's Snakin' Who? (with Dr. John, Corery Glover and others)
- Bluesiana Hurricane - Halfsteppin (with Bill Doggett, Lester Bowie and others)
- Skallelujah - with Joe Ferry
- Strength - with Toko Furuuchi
- Secrets - with Toni Braxton
- In Front of My Eyes - with Bakithi Kumalo
- Harris Bros Horns - with Joel Rosenblatt, Robert Aires and Dave Anderson
- A Woman's Love - with Vanesse Thomas
- BIG SKA - with Joe Ferry
- I'll Take Care of You - with Chuck Jackson and Cissy Houston
- Let the Feeling Flow - with Matt Jordan and Kelli Sae
- Poseidon's Son - with Kati Mac
- Nicole Hart Live NRG! - with Nicole Hart
- The Christmas Album - with David Clayton Thomas
- Blues for a Sunday Morning - 2000 - Various Artists (Compilation)
- Public Domain - 2000 - Various Artists (compilation - Gil Parris was nominated for a Grammy in 2001 for his creative solo guitar arrangement of "Pop Goes the Weasel")
- iBod - with Ivan "Funkboy" Bodley
- Arenal - with Ronnie Dinoto
- In Joy - Gordon James
- Live-Terry Silverlight (w/Will Lee, Chris Hunter, Rob Aires, Clifford Carter, etc...)
