= David Oks =

American writer (born 2001)

- Born: David E. Oks; 2001 (age 24–25)
- Education: Pembroke College, Oxford
- Known for: Managing the Mike Gravel 2020 presidential campaign

David E. Oks (/ɒks/) is an American writer and former political activist, best known for organizing and managing the Mike Gravel 2020 presidential campaign as a high school senior. In 2020, Oks helped found The Gravel Institute, a progressive political advocacy group named after Mike Gravel, following the end of Gravel's 2020 presidential campaign.

== Early life and education ==
Oks was born to a family of Jewish immigrants from Argentina, who have been described as "socialist" in regards to his views.

Oks attended the Masters School, where he was a student when he convinced former senator Mike Gravel to enter the 2020 Democratic presidential primaries. He enrolled in Pembroke College at the University of Oxford in the fall of 2019.

== Campaign work ==
Oks previously ran an unsuccessful write-in campaign for mayor of Ardsley, New York in 2017. His campaign for mayor was notable for his young age, which received attention in The New York Times and on WNYC. He garnered 50 votes, or approximately 3% of the vote, in the election.

=== Mike Gravel 2020 presidential campaign ===
Oks contacted Gravel on March 14, 2019, to propose a campaign in the 2020 Democratic presidential primaries. The stated goal was not to win the primaries but to reach the Democratic debate stage. Gravel was hesitant at first, but Oks and school friend Henry Williams convinced Gravel to launch a campaign in order to promote their left-of-center political views.

According to Oks, he first learned about Gravel from Nixonland by Rick Perlstein, but was also encouraged by Felix Biederman's praise of Gravel on socialist podcast Chapo Trap House.

Shortly after the campaign unofficially launched on March 20, 2019, Oks claimed authorship of posts that attracted much attention on Twitter.

Along with Williams, Oks was the subject of a June 9, 2019 profile in The New York Times Magazine.

After Gravel's campaign ended on August 6, 2019, Oks said that his goal with the campaign was "to push for a new sort of politics" and "to talk about issues we thought no other candidate was talking about."

== Subsequent work ==
According to The American Prospect, Oks was involved with the creation of the Gravel Institute, a now defunct advocacy group that promoted progressive causes and ideas through YouTube videos.

Oks has written several articles for Palladium Magazine, including reporting from Afghanistan and Ukraine.

With Henry Williams, Oks published a piece in American Affairs arguing that outside of East Asia, development built on manufacturing has generally failed and has weak prospects.
