= Ardsley, New York =

- Village
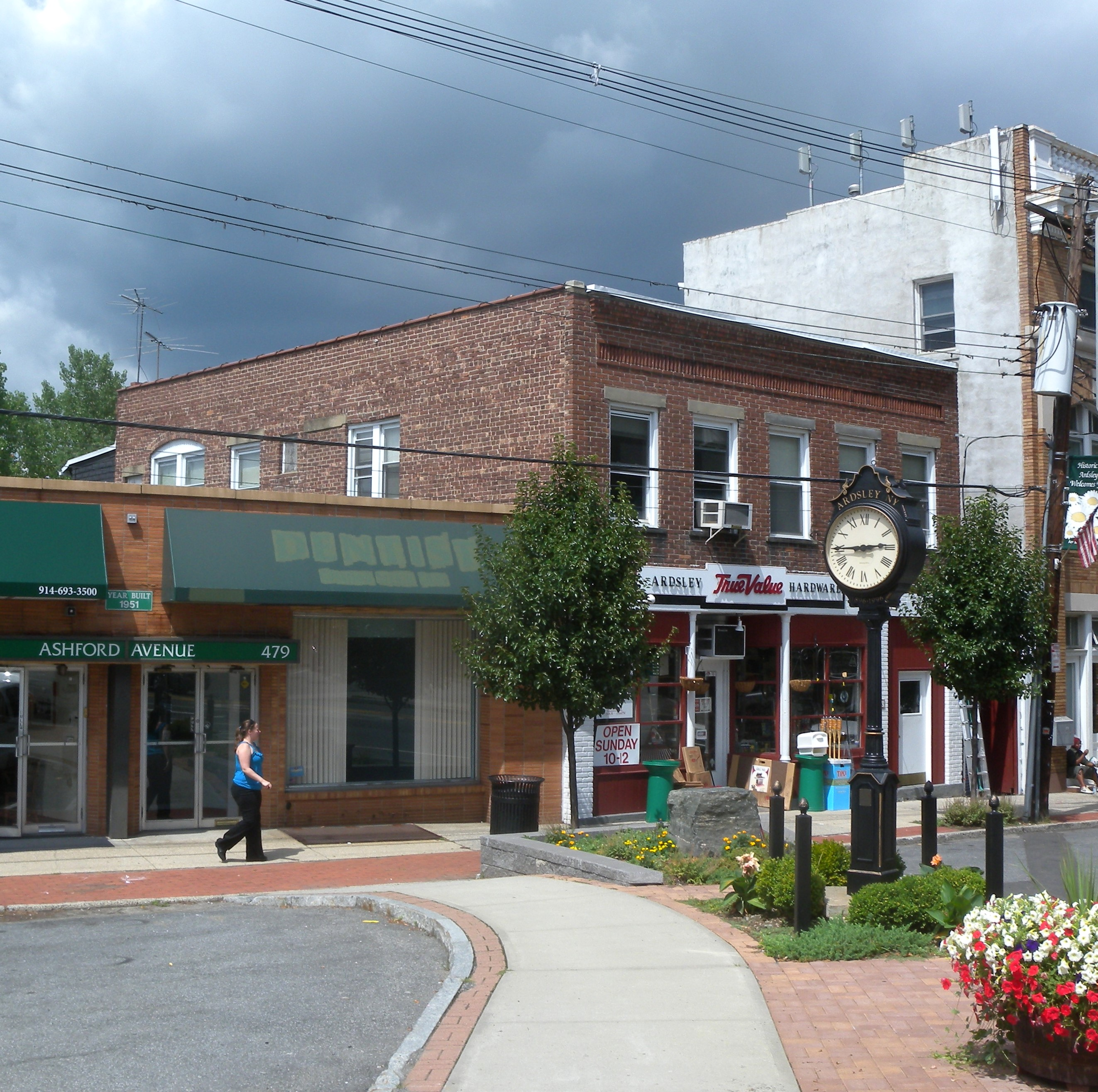
- Downtown Ardsley

- Seal Logo

- Location of Ardsley, New York
- Coordinates: 41°0′41″N 73°50′29″W
- Country: United States
- State: New York
- County: Westchester
- Town: Greenburgh

Government
  - Mayor: Steve Edelstein

Area
  - Total: 1.32 sq mi (3.42 km^{2})
  - Land: 1.32 sq mi (3.42 km^{2})
  - Water: 0 sq mi (0.00 km^{2})
- Elevation: 210 ft (64 m)

Population (2020)
  - Total: 5,079
  - Density: 3,844.8/sq mi (1,484.49/km^{2})
- Time zone: UTC-5 (Eastern (EST))
  - Summer (DST): UTC-4 (EDT)
- ZIP Code: 10502
- Area code: 914
- FIPS code: 36-02506
- GNIS feature ID: 0942544
- Website: www.ardsleyvillage.gov

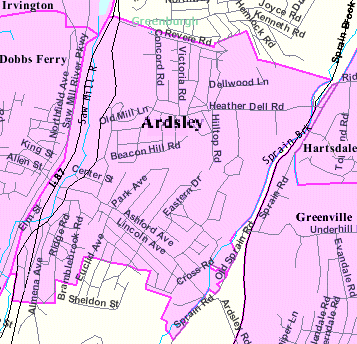
Map of Ardsley

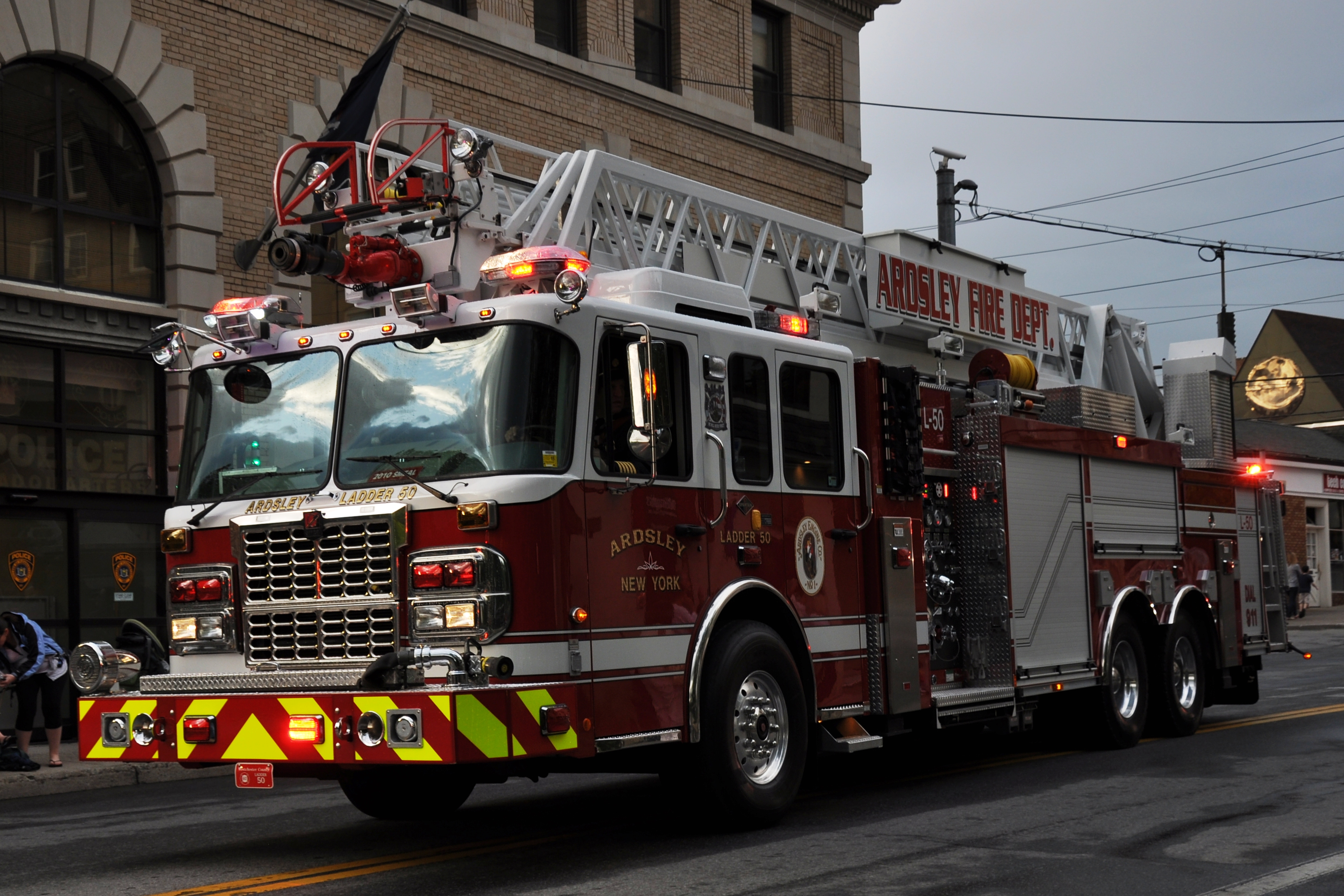
Ardsley Fire Department engine

Ardsley is a village in Westchester County, New York, United States. It is part of the town of Greenburgh. The village's population was 5,079 at the 2020 census. The mayor of Ardsley is Steve Edelstein.

The Ardsley post office serves the entire village of Ardsley, plus some nearby unincorporated sections of Greenburgh. The Ardsley Union Free School District includes the entire village of Ardsley plus parts of the village of Dobbs Ferry and unincorporated parts of Greenburgh. Ardsley has a library that is a member of the Westchester Library System.

Ardsley should not be confused with the nearby hamlet of Ardsley-on-Hudson, which is part of the village of Irvington.

== History ==
Prior to European settlement Ardsley and its surrounding area was inhabited by the Wickquasgeck tribe, a band of the Wappinger, related to the Lenape (Delaware) tribes which dominated lower New York state and New Jersey.

After the Dutch came to the area, the land was part of the Bisightick tract of the van der Donck grant purchased by Frederick Philipse in 1682, first lord of Philipsburg Manor. In 1781, during the American Revolutionary War, the Ardsley area was part of the Philipsburg Encampment of allied American and French forces. The Continental Army camped on both sides of Military Road (now Heatherdell Road), and George Washington's headquarters were at Appleby’s farmhouse (on present-day Secor Road). In 1785, the state of New York confiscated the land from the last lord of Philipsburg Manor, Frederick Philipse III, who was a prominent Loyalist, and sold it to local farmers who had been tenants of the Philipse family.

The village of Ashford was formed from some of these portions, named for the main road. Notable businesses included a blacksmith, and a sawmill and grist mill both situated upon the Saw Mill River. Three pickle factories were in operation by the Civil War, and in the 1880s the construction of the Putnam Railroad and New Croton Aqueduct led to a population boom which saw the installation of electric lighting and improved roads.

Due to the presence of an earlier Ashford Post Office in New York state, the town was forced to change its name in order to receive its own. The choice of "Ardsley" is attributed to Cyrus West Field, who owned 780 acres (3.2 km^{2}) of land lying between Broadway (Dobbs Ferry) and Sprain Brook (Greenburgh) named Ardsley Park. He had named his home Ardsley Park after the English birthplace of his immigrant ancestor, Zechariah Field (East Ardsley, West Riding of Yorkshire, England), who immigrated to the U.S. in 1629. The story told at one time is that Field agreed to use his influence to get the post office established, and in return the village would be renamed Ardsley. The first village postmaster was appointed in 1883.

Ardsley was incorporated as a town in 1896. Ardsley High School was established in 1912, with an addition in 1925. The town would continue to grow at a steady pace until a fire destroyed the village center in December 1914. This led to the reconstruction of several buildings, and the establishment of a fire department in the former schoolhouse. Two population booms would follow, the first between the end of World War I and the beginning of the Great Depression, and the second following World War II. The Concord Road elementary school was built in 1953 with an addition in 1966. The town outgrew its original high school by the mid-1950s, resulting in the current facility being opened in 1957, and graduating its first class in 1958. The old school was converted into a middle school, until in 1971 when the $5.5 million middle school was built.

The village was greatly changed during its second boom by the construction of the New York State Thruway in the late 1950s, which resulted in both the loss of the Ardsley station on the Putnam Division of the New York Central Railroad and the loss of much of the downtown business district.

In the 1972, the downtown of Ardsley was flooded from Hurricane Agnes, and in 1980, Ardsley set both their all-time hottest and coldest recorded temperature. The village's first female mayor, Marie Stimpfl, was elected in March 1983. In 2001, Ardsley lost a reserve fire fighter to the attacks on September 11. The village has experienced slight growth since then.

== Geography ==
According to the United States Census Bureau, the village has a total area of 1.3 square miles (3.4 km^{2}), all land.

The Saw Mill River and Sprain Brook are two waterways that run through Ardsley. Over the years recurrent flooding along the Saw Mill River has caused damage to residential structures, commercial businesses, and industries as well as municipal infrastructure in Ardsley and other towns along the river. Recent severe floods occurred in March and April 1980, April 1984, and September 1999. The Army Corps of Engineers has completed several construction projects to help minimize potential damage from future floods in downtown Ardsley and surrounding areas.

=== Climate ===
The climate in this area is characterized by hot, humid summers and generally mild to cool winters. According to the Köppen Climate Classification system, Ardsley has a humid subtropical climate, abbreviated "Cfa" on climate maps.

It receives approximately 28 inches of snow per year.

== Demographics ==
Historical population
Census	Pop.	Note	%±
1900	404		—
1910	537		32.9%
1920	730		35.9%
1930	1,135		55.5%
1940	1,423		25.4%
1950	1,744		22.6%
1960	3,991		128.8%
1970	4,470		12.0%
1980	4,183		−6.4%
1990	4,272		2.1%
2000	4,269		−0.1%
2010	4,452		4.3%
2020	5,079		14.1%
2021 (est.)	5,006	▼	−1.4%
U.S. Decennial Census

=== 2020 census ===
As of the 2020 census, Ardsley had a population of 5,079. The median age was 43.1 years. 26.2% of residents were under the age of 18 and 19.7% of residents were 65 years of age or older. For every 100 females there were 93.9 males, and for every 100 females age 18 and over there were 89.5 males age 18 and over.

100.0% of residents lived in urban areas, while 0.0% lived in rural areas.

There were 1,657 households in Ardsley, of which 45.9% had children under the age of 18 living in them. Of all households, 69.2% were married-couple households, 8.3% were households with a male householder and no spouse or partner present, and 20.2% were households with a female householder and no spouse or partner present. About 14.0% of all households were made up of individuals and 10.8% had someone living alone who was 65 years of age or older.

There were 1,721 housing units, of which 3.7% were vacant. The homeowner vacancy rate was 0.6% and the rental vacancy rate was 7.0%.

Racial composition as of the 2020 census
Race	Number	Percent
White	3,337	65.7%
Black or African American	189	3.7%
American Indian and Alaska Native	11	0.2%
Asian	893	17.6%
Native Hawaiian and Other Pacific Islander	2	0.0%
Some other race	137	2.7%
Two or more races	510	10.0%
Hispanic or Latino (of any race)	525	10.3%

=== Demographic estimates ===
Per the U.S. Census Bureau's 2018 estimates, 68.3% of residents were non-Hispanic white.

=== 2000 census ===
As of the 2000 census, there were 4,269 people, 1,432 households, and 1,212 families residing in the village. The population density was 3,242.9 inhabitants per square mile (1,252.1/km^{2}). There were 1,456 housing units at an average density of 1,106.0 units per square mile (427.0 units/km^{2}). The racial makeup of the village was 84.00% White, 1.52% African American, 0.09% Native American, 12.34% Asian, 0.02% Pacific Islander, 0.73% from other races, and 1.29% from two or more races. Hispanic or Latino of any race were 4.26% of the population.

There were 1,432 households, out of which 43.5% had children under the age of 18 living with them, 75.1% were married couples living together, 7.5% had a female householder with no husband present, and 15.3% were non-families. 12.9% of all households were made up of individuals, and 7.0% had someone living alone who was 65 years of age or older. The average household size was 2.96 and the average family size was 3.22.

In the village, the population was spread out, with 27.9% under the age of 18, 4.5% from 18 to 24, 24.5% from 25 to 44, 27.8% from 45 to 64, and 15.3% who were 65 years of age or older. The median age was 42 years. For every 100 females there were 96.1 males. For every 100 females age 18 and over, there were 93.2 males.

The median income for a household in the village was $105,293, and the median income for a family was $126,239. Males had a median income of $88,012 versus $57,216 for females. The per capita income for the village was $47,086. About 0.4% of families and 1.3% of the population were below the poverty line, including 0.4% of those under age 18 and 3.8% of those age 65 or over.

== Education ==
The Ardsley Union Free School District operates the village's public schools. Ardsley High School is the district's senior high school.

Lyceum Kennedy International School maintains its Ardsley campus, serving elementary grades.

== Culture ==
The screenplay for Unfaithful (2002 film) specifically cites Ardsley as its location; the script calls the setting, "a quiet commuter suburb."

In 2018, Brooke Lea Foster of The New York Times stated that it was one of several "Rivertowns" in New York State, even though physically Ardsley is not adjacent to a river; she described these "Rivertowns" as among the "least suburban of suburbs, each one celebrated by buyers there for its culture and hip factor, as much as the housing stock and sophisticated post-city life." Of those, Foster stated that Ardsley was "the most landlocked".

== Infrastructure ==
=== Public transit ===
The Bee-Line Bus System serves Ardsley with several lines. Lines running north–south along Route 9A and 100B like 1C, 5, and 6 provide connections with Elmsford, White Plains, and Getty Square, Yonkers. Lines running east–west like 66 provide connections to commuter rail stations and the downtowns of Dobbs Ferry, Scarsdale, Larchmont, and New Rochelle.

With the demise of the New York and Putnam Railroad in favor of the construction of Interstate 87, commuter rail service to New York City is available via the Dobbs Ferry train station and Ardsley-on-Hudson train station, served by Metro-North Railroad's Hudson Line, and the Hartsdale train station and Scarsdale train station served by Metro-North Railroad's Harlem Line.

=== Pathways ===
There is also the motor-free South County Trail connecting Ardsley to the Empire State Trail across New York State. The trail is frequently used by bicyclists and pedestrians whether they just want to take a stroll or if they want to get to places, such as Elmsford or Yonkers. The trail runs along the path where the New York and Putnam Railroad once stood.

== Notable people ==
- David Oks, writer and political activist
- Harold Goldsmith (1930–2004), Olympic foil and épée fencer
- Jesse McCartney, singer, songwriter, and actor
- Timothy A. McDonnell, prelate of the Roman Catholic Church
- Marshall Rogers, comics artist
- Funkmaster Flex, professional disc jockey
- Jane Schoenbrun, filmmaker

== See also ==
- Ardsley High School
- Lyceum Kennedy
