= Dobbs Ferry Union Free School District =

School district in the U.S. state of New York

Address
- 505 BROADWAY Dobbs Ferry New York; United States
- Coordinates: 41.0177°N 73.8708°W

District information
- Type: Public school district
- Grades: K–12
- Superintendent: Kenneth Slentz
- Chair of the board: Tracy Baron
- NCES District ID: 3609120

Students and staff
- Students: 1,503
- Teachers: 145.04
- Staff: 102.25
- Student–teacher ratio: 10.36

Other information
- Website: www.dfsd.org

Dobbs Ferry Union Free School District is a grade K–12 school district based in Dobbs Ferry, New York, in the Hudson Valley, approximately 20 miles north of midtown Manhattan. It is a Union Free School District, which relates to its organizational structure, and it is not affiliated with labor unions. The teachers are members of Dobbs Ferry United Teachers. The district is very small compared to other districts in Westchester County, New York, with approximately 112 students per grade in three schools: Springhurst Elementary School, Dobbs Ferry Middle School, and Dobbs Ferry High School.

The school district's governing body is the elected board of education, consisting of seven members, each serving a three-year term. The board members choose the President and Vice-president for one-year terms. Additionally, the board is responsible for hiring the superintendent, with Kenneth Slentz serving as the superintendent in 2024.

== Springhurst Elementary School ==
Springhurst Elementary School is a small coeducational public elementary school in Dobbs Ferry, New York. Grades range from Kindergarten to fifth grade.

== Dobbs Ferry Middle School ==
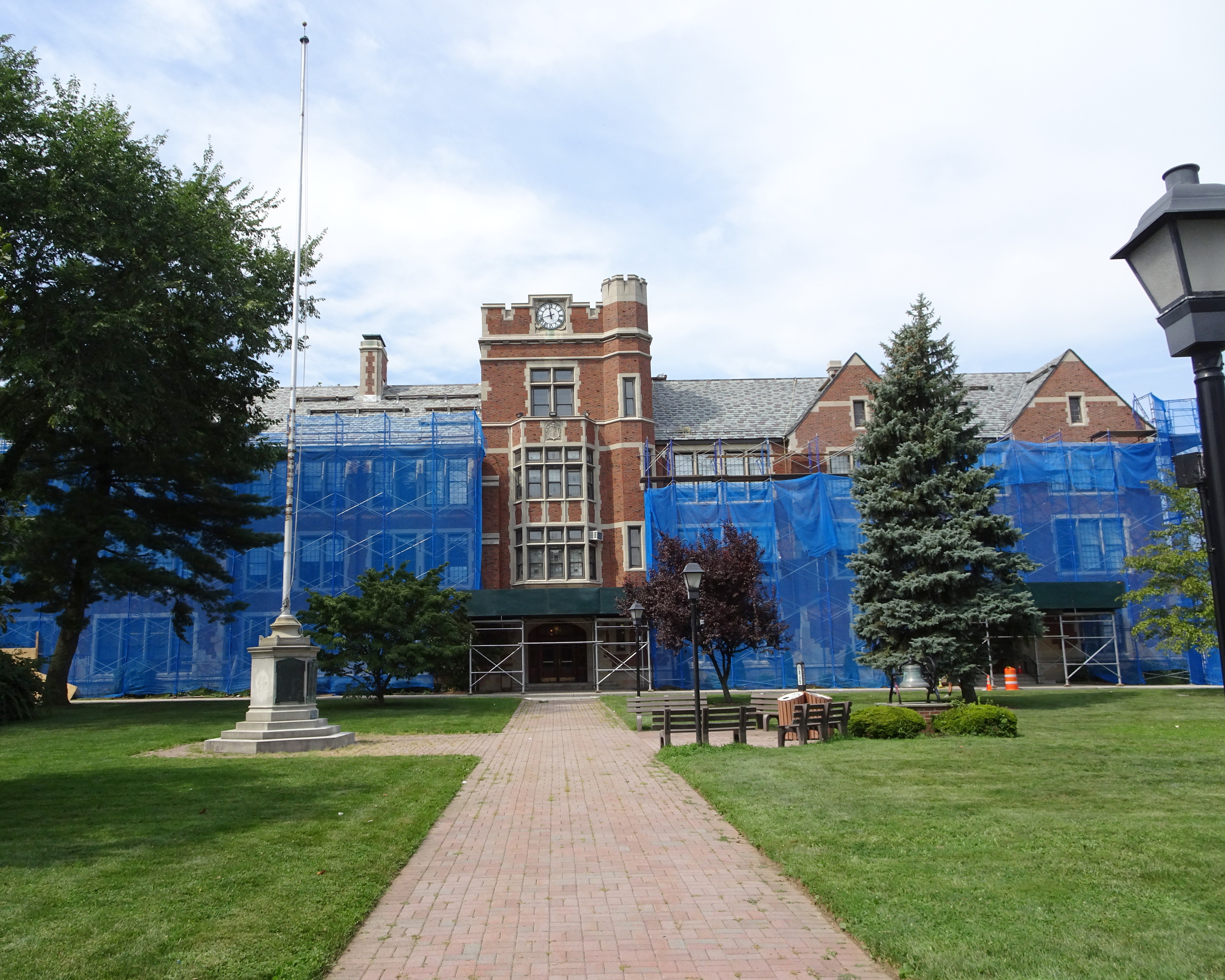
Dobbs Ferry Middle and High School

Dobbs Ferry Middle School is a coeducational public middle school. Grades range from sixth to eighth. Dobbs Ferry uses the International Baccalaureate (IB) Middle Years Programme (MYP) throughout its curriculum.

== Dobbs Ferry High School ==
Dobbs Ferry High School is a coeducational public high school offering an International Baccalaureate (IB) program. It has been authorized as an IB World School since 1998.

== Parent and community support of the school district ==
Parents in the district have established several affiliated groups to support and represent their interests in the district. These include:

- Dobbs Ferry Parent-Teacher-Student Association (PTSA): includes high school student representatives, it's the formal body by which parents support the students;
- Dobbs Ferry Schools Foundation: raises funds through an annual gala to supplement school programs and teacher training;
- SPRING Community Partners: ensures that all children in the district have the resources to succeed in school and beyond; and
- Dobbs Ferry Trail Guides: supports and advocates for children, founded by parents of children with special needs.

== Geographic boundaries ==
The boundaries of the Dobbs Ferry school district are not identical to those of the Village of Dobbs Ferry. Some residents of the Ardsley Park neighborhood in the Village of Irvington are part of the Dobbs Ferry school district. Also, all residents of the Northfield neighborhood in Dobbs Ferry and some residents of the Knoll and Southfield neighborhoods are in the Ardsley school district. Residents in properties that cross borders with neighboring districts can choose which district they want to be a part of.

== History ==
The first purpose-built school building in the village was on Main Street, built in 1857, roughly opposite the present town hall. That served until 1896, when a new building was completed on Broadway, just south of the present High School, on what had been the Appleton estate. That 1896 building was doubled in size in the early 20th century with an addition on the back. The addition became the high school, and the front part was the elementary school. The building was dedicated on December 22, 1896, and the ceremony was recounted on page 1 of the December 25, 1896, issue of the Dobbs Ferry Register. The present high school was a WPA project, begun in 1934 and completed in 1936. The 1896 building and the 1936 building sat side by side and comprised the entire school system until Springhurst School was built on the former F. Q. Brown estate in the late 1950s.

The village engaged in a prolonged debate over whether to build Springhurst. The old buildings were overcrowded, and students in many grades were placed in "double sessions." This meant that some students went very early in the morning until mid-day, while others started at mid-day and stayed until late afternoon. Despite these challenges, the proposal was repeatedly rejected in votes. Eventually, Springhurst was built, and the 1896 building became the middle school for grades 5 through 8. In the 1960s or early 70s, Springhurst was expanded and the deteriorating 1896 building, which was becoming structurally unsound, was demolished.
