= Edith Chapin =

American journalist

- Education: Northwestern University
- Occupation: Journalist

Edith Chapin is an American journalist and was the Editor in Chief and Chief Content Officer of NPR News. Chapin announced her resignation for September or October 2025, following cuts in federal funding. Previously the senior supervising editor of the NPR News Foreign Desk, Chapin had spent 25 years at CNN prior to joining NPR.

== Early life ==
The daughter of a Foreign Service officer, Edith Chapin spent years living in Brazil, Ethiopia, and Guatemala. Chapin attended The Masters School from 1979 to 1983, before obtaining a Bachelor of Journalism degree from Northwestern University's Medill School of Journalism in 1986.

== Career ==
After graduating from Northwestern, Chapin started to work for CNN. She spent 25 years at the network, eventually achieving the position of Vice President and Deputy Bureau Chief of CNN's Washington, D.C. bureau.

During her career at CNN, Chapin was present in New York City during the September 11 attacks. She was the first to alert the network that a plane had hit the World Trade Center on 9/11. She subsequently directed all coverage of the attacks and their aftermath. She contributed to a 2002 book recounting the events of September 11, Covering Catastrophe.

In 2012, she joined NPR as the senior supervising editor of the NPR News Foreign Desk. In 2015, she was promoted to executive editor of NPR.

== Awards ==
Chapin received a Peabody Award for her coverage of Hurricane Katrina in 2005.

== Links ==
Portrait on YouTube (2018)
