= Hyatt-Livingston House =

Historic house in New York, United States

- U.S. National Register of Historic Places
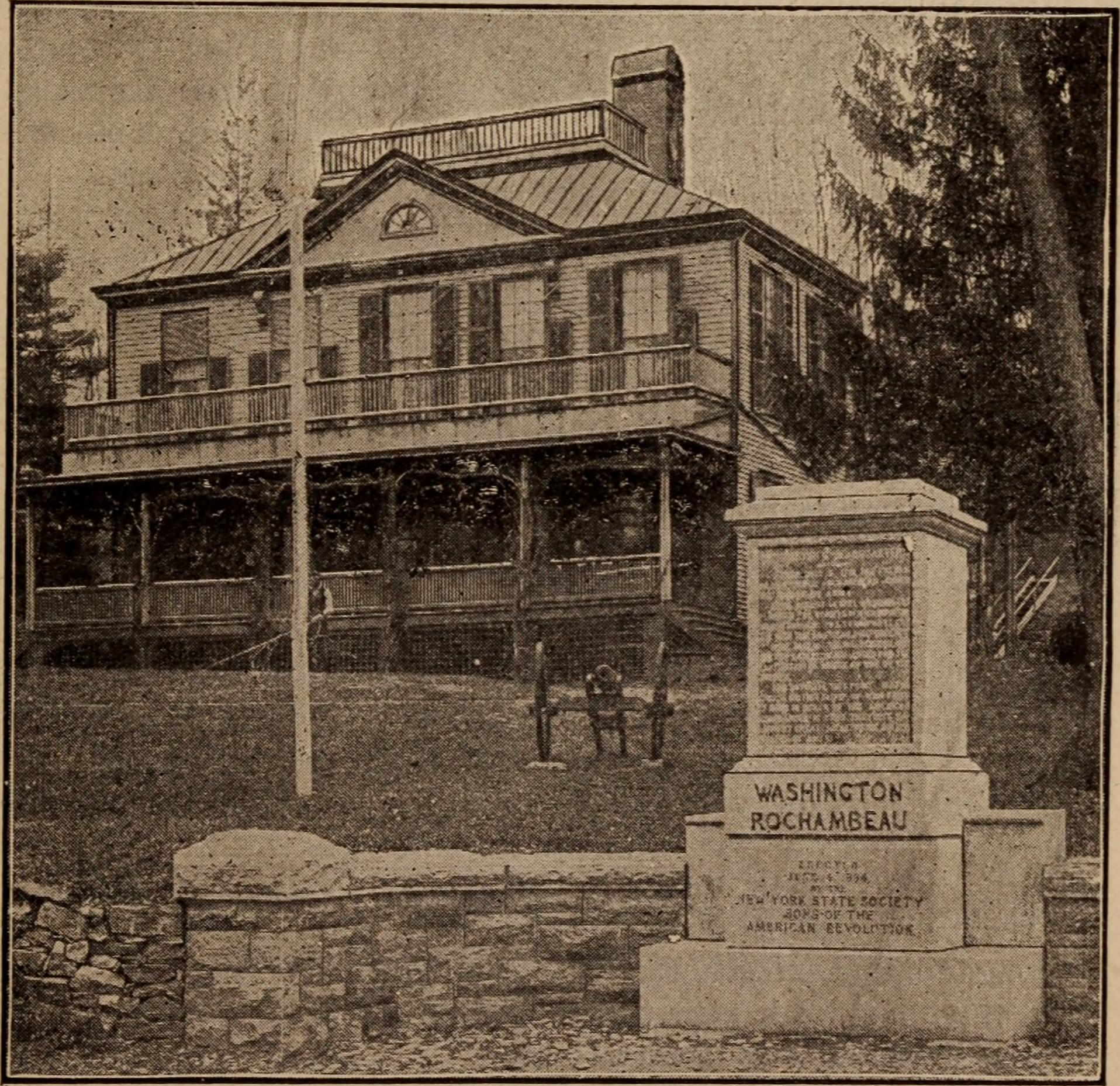
- 1904 image of the house

- Location within New York Location within the United States
- Location: 152 Broadway, Dobbs Ferry, New York
- Coordinates: 41°0′32″N 73°52′45″W
- Area: 3 acres (1.2 ha)
- Built: ca. 1698
- NRHP reference No.: 72000917
- Added to NRHP: October 5, 1972

Hyatt-Livingston House was an historic home located at Dobbs Ferry, Westchester County, New York, at the corner of Colonial Avenue and Broadway (Route 9). Originally constructed as part of the Philipsburg Manor around 1690 by land baron Frederick Philipse, the house was at first a smaller tenant-farmer's dwelling home to the John Hyatt family. In 1705, Hyatt's daughter Elizabeth married neighbor John Dobbs, who originally brought that family name to the area and perhaps started the ferry for which the village is named (the first ferryman was either John or his son William). In the early 18th century, the house was enlarged to a five-bay, 2 1/2-story dwelling that then formed the central part of the house. It was of wood-frame construction, with a gable roof, and sat on a fieldstone foundation.

Ownership changed as a direct result of the American Revolution. The Philipse family were loyal to the British Crown. By a state confiscation act affecting them and other loyalists, the entire huge estate and the land was auctioned off or, in some cases, turned over to the tenant farmers. The house and adjoining property was acquired by Philip Livingston, a wealthy New York merchant.

The elegant 2-story west wing was built by Peter Van Brugh Livingston, brother of Philip Livingston, who signed the Declaration of Independence. Peter was the first New York state treasurer, and made his fortune from the Atlantic slave trade.

A monument in front of the house, placed in 1895, falsely claimed that, during the American Revolution, the house served as George Washington's headquarters for a period in 1781.

Mesmore Kendall Sr., a New York socialite, purchased the house in 1916. It was in poor condition then, but he restored it and filled it with period furniture and George Washington memorabilia. Kendall died in 1959. image = Hyatt_Livingston_interior_1.jpg

The Croton aqueduct passed right behind the mansion, and a little brook was piped under the aqueduct to feed the small swimming pool behind the mansion.

The house was added to the National Register of Historic Places in 1972. The house was destroyed by fire on September 1, 1974.

The monument in front with the false inscription about the house having been Washington's headquarters was corrected in 2000.

== See also ==
- National Register of Historic Places listings in southern Westchester County, New York
