= Veena Dubal =

American law professor

Veena B. Dubal
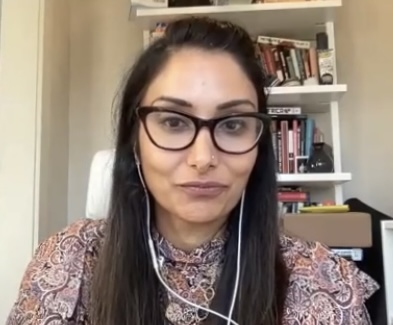
- Education: Stanford University (BA); University of California, Berkeley (JD, PhD)
- Scientific career
- Institutions: University of California College of the Law, San Francisco; Clayman Institute for Gender Research
- Thesis: Wage Slave or Entrepreneur?: Contesting the Dualism of Legal Worker Identities

Veena B. Dubal is a Professor of Law at the University of California, Irvine School of Law. Her research focuses on the intersection of law, technology, and precarious work. Dubal's scholarship on gig work has been widely cited.

== Early life and education ==
Dubal studied international relations and feminist studies at Stanford University and graduated with honours in 2003. She attended to the University of California, Berkeley for her Juris Doctor, which she completed in 2006. While in law school Dubal was a community activist focused on anti-war campaigns. She was a part of the Alliance of South Asians Taking Action.

Dubal was a Fulbright Program scholar in India from 2007 to 2008. After graduating, she was a Berkeley Law Foundation Fellow and public interest attorney at the Asian Law Caucus until December 2012. Dubal earned a PhD in Jurisprudence and Social Policy at UC Berkeley in 2014. Her doctoral research used historical and ethnographic methodologies to study San Francisco taxi workers.

== Research and career ==
After earning her PhD, Dubal joined the Clayman Institute for Gender Research as a postdoctoral fellow. Dubal was appointed as an associate professor at the University of California College of the Law, San Francisco in 2015. Her research considers the impact of digital technologies on the lives of their workers, the relationship between law, precarious work and identity and the role of law in solidarity movements.

Dubal is a critic of big tech and the rise of harmful artificial intelligence. She has described the transformation of service work following the great recession as Uberisation. She has investigated the taxi economy in San Francisco pre- and post-Uber, and how the everyday experiences of drivers changed with commodification of medallions, the leasing system, and the de-regulation following the legalization of TNCs.

Dubal, who WIRED magazine called "an unlikely star in the tech world" has called for the regulation of tech companies that promote a gig economy by misclassifying their workers as independent contractors. She was one of 75 professors across the United States who wrote to the California Legislature to support Assembly Bill 5 and to advocate that gig companies like Uber and Lyft not get a special interest carveout from California employment laws. In September 2019 California passed the law, which codified a California Supreme Court decision.

== Journalism and advocacy ==
Dubal has studied and written about the rise of the technology labor movement through organized protests, such as the 2018 Google walkouts and 2019 Uber strike. Dubal has written for The Guardian, The Los Angeles Times and Slate. Dubal has advocated for cities to restrict facial recognition technologies in an effort to minimize citizen surveillance and inappropriate data collection. Dubal served on the board of directors of the Gravel Institute, a progressive organization.
