= Our Lady of Victory Academy =

Location
- 565 Broadway; Dobbs Ferry, (Westchester County), New York 10522; United States; 41°1′11″N 73°52′13″W

Information
- Type: Private, all-female
- Religious affiliations: Roman Catholic; Sisters of Mercy
- Established: 1961
- Closed: 2011
- President: Sr. Patricia Wolf
- Principal: Sr. Joan Agro
- Grades: 9-12
- Student to teacher ratio: 16:1
- Colors: Green and white
- Team name: Jaguars
- Accreditation: Middle States Association of Colleges and Schools
- Dean of Students: Liz Lynch
- Athletic Director: Marie McManus

Our Lady of Victory Academy was a private, all-girls, Roman Catholic high school in Dobbs Ferry, New York.

Our Lady of Victory Academy was established in 1961 by the Sisters of Mercy, who had established Mercy College on the same site in 1960.

It was dedicated to preparing young women to take their full place in church and society by providing quality secondary education in fidelity to the Gospel, Catholic tradition, and the Mercy charism. The school closed in June 2011 after experiencing increasing financial deficits. The facility was taken over by Mercy College, which had previously shared the use of the building and campus utility system.
