= Mike Gravel 2020 presidential campaign =

American political campaign

- Campaign: 2020 United States presidential election (Democratic primaries)
- Candidate: Mike Gravel; U.S. Senator from Alaska (1969–1981); Speaker of the Alaska House of Representatives (1965–1967); Member of the Alaska House of Representatives (1963–1967)
- Affiliation: Democratic Party
- EC formed: March 19, 2019
- Announced: April 8, 2019
- Suspended: August 6, 2019
- Headquarters: Ardsley, New York
- Key people: David Oks (campaign manager); Henry Williams (chief of staff); Henry Magowan (treasurer)
- Receipts: US$120,798.51 (2019-09-30)
- Slogan: No More Wars

Website
- www.mikegravel.org

Mike Gravel, a former U.S. senator from Alaska, began his 2020 presidential campaign on March 19, 2019, with the formation of an exploratory committee. On April 2, his campaign filed with the Federal Elections Commission to officially run for the presidency. Gravel's initial intention was not to win the nomination, but rather to inject his platform into the conversation so that his ideas become part of the mainstream, though he announced that he was "running to win" on April 29, potentially after realizing that a candidacy focused on sending a message rather than putting him in the presidency might disqualify him from the primary debates.

The campaign was also notable for its young leadership; manager David Oks and chief of staff Henry Williams were only 18 years old. The pair, and other young staffers, developed an online identity and fanbase as the "Gravel Teens."

The campaign reached 65,000 donors on July 12, 2019, officially qualifying him for the second Democratic presidential primary debate. However, he was left out of the debate as he only qualified via donations (which are given less weight than polling). Gravel indicated in July (as well as early August) that the campaign would come to a close soon, with Gravel's campaign staff stating on Twitter on August 5, 2019, that they will be "dropping out very soon".

Gravel officially dropped out on August 6, 2019. He endorsed Bernie Sanders the same day, while simultaneously endorsing Tulsi Gabbard to be Sanders's running mate. Had Gravel won the 2020 election, he would have become the oldest president in American history, being 90 years old at the time of the inauguration in January 2021. Gravel died in June 2021.

== Background ==
Gravel has served in the U.S. Senate representing the state of Alaska from 1969 to 1981, as well as the Speaker of the Alaska House of Representatives from 1965 to 1967.

He gained national attention during his tenure in the Senate for his strong anti-war beliefs, specifically against the War in Vietnam. He garnered significant media attention by reading previously unreleased segments of the Pentagon Papers into the Congressional Record given to him by prominent socialists Noam Chomsky and Howard Zinn, making them public knowledge via a loophole discovered by Daniel Ellsberg.

Gravel's presidential bid was his second, following his 2008 campaign for president. In 2008, he was noted by pundits for his debate performances. However, he never reached significant polling numbers.

On March 11, 2019, a discussion about Gravel came up on the 296th episode of the leftist comedy podcast Chapo Trap House, "The Unsullied", where one of the hosts, Felix Biederman, claimed "Mike Gravel is the only politician I ever felt, like, represented me." Three days later, David Oks, a high school senior, and Henry Williams, a college freshman, both avid listeners of Chapo Trap House, persuaded the former senator to run for president through a phone call and assured him he would not travel too much. On March 20, the r/Gravelforpresident subreddit would be created and Williams' account 'u/Gravelanche' (in reference to the portmanteau often used by Gravel's campaign manager and supporters to nickname the campaign) would be added as moderator.

== Campaign ==
=== Exploratory committee ===
Gravel first entered the 2020 Democratic Party presidential primaries on March 19, 2019 by forming an exploratory committee. Late that day, Gravel's campaign posted on Twitter that he was not entering the campaign to win, rather to bring anti-war ideas to the Democratic debate stage, as well as that there would be a formal announcement in the coming days.

His Twitter account was run by Oks and Williams who became the campaign manager and chief of staff, respectively. They posted attacks on other Democratic presidential candidates and potential candidates Kamala Harris, Joe Biden, Cory Booker, Pete Buttigieg, and Beto O'Rourke while praising fellow candidates Bernie Sanders and Tulsi Gabbard, including when Gravel urged them not to make personal attacks and rather focus on policy critiques.

=== Campaign announcement ===
On April 2, 2019, Gravel's exploratory committee filed paperwork with the Federal Elections Commission to officially run for the presidency. The campaign was announced on April 8 alongside Gravel's platform. That same day, the Mike Gravel YouTube channel posted a sequel to the viral "Rock" ad from Gravel's 2008 campaign with "Rock 2.0". On April 29, an email announcement went out stating that Gravel would now be running to win "[j]ust as much as Seth Moulton, John Delaney, John Hickenlooper, Tim Ryan, or Eric Swalwell are."

In June 2019, Gravel touted the endorsement of Muntadher al-Zaidi, the Iraqi journalist who, in December 2008, made headlines after he threw his shoes at President George W. Bush in protest of the U.S. war in Iraq. Al-Zaidi endorsed Gravel based on his promise to improve White House policies regarding Iraq and the Middle East.

On June 13, 2019, the Democratic Party announced the 20 major candidates who qualified for the first debate later that month. Gravel was one of the four who were excluded (the others were Montana Governor Steve Bullock, U.S. Representative Seth Moulton, and Miramar, Florida, Mayor Wayne Messam). He had failed to get the requisite number of donations or to score one percent or better in enough polls; indeed he failed to reach that threshold in any poll, many of which did not include him. Nevertheless, Gravel said he would not drop out and would try to qualify for the July debate. In early June 2019, FiveThirtyEight listed him as a "major candidate." On July 12, the campaign announced it had reached 65,000 donations, meeting the donor threshold, but because the donor requirement was given less weight than polling he was not invited to appear at the second debate.

=== Suspension ===
On August 6, 2019, Gravel officially announced that he was suspending his campaign and co-endorsed U.S. Senator Bernie Sanders and U.S. Representative Tulsi Gabbard for president. Reports circulated that Gravel had endorsed Howie Hawkins as the Green Party nominee. This was later clarified by Gravel, who stated "No, I don't know much about him. So I haven't endorsed anybody else in that regard...To my knowledge, I haven't endorsed him because I don't know what he represents in that regard."

== Political positions ==
The campaign's platform was released on April 7 to coincide with the campaign launch. It was released as a live Google Doc and the campaign asked for requests for amendments via Twitter. In response to the Black Socialists in America, Gravel self-described as someone who supports "us moving towards a society where the workers control the means of production in a democratic and decentralized fashion".

=== Foreign policy ===
Gravel's campaign was based around bringing a critique of American imperialism and general American foreign policy to the Democratic debate stage. Foreign policy would include:

- Acceding to the 1970 Treaty on the Non-Proliferation of Nuclear Weapons
- Signing and ratifying the 2017 Treaty on the Prohibition of Nuclear Weapons
- Officially declaring that the U.S. will not be the first to use nuclear weapons.
- Repealing the 2001 Authorization for Use of Military Force Against Terrorists
- Renaming the Department of Defense to the 'Department of War', as well as creating a Department of Peace
- Reforming the United Nations Security Council
- Ending all unilateral sanctions against foreign countries
- Ending military aid to Israel and Saudi Arabia
- Ending sales of arms by companies like Lockheed Martin and Northrop Grumman to foreign countries
- Officially ending the Korean War, promoting cultural exchange between North Korea and South Korea, reuniting families separated by the war, apologizing to victims of the Jeju uprising and No Gun Ri massacre and potentially offering compensation
- Closing every foreign military base, beginning with those in Muslim-majority countries
- Cutting military spending by 50%
- Vowing not to invade foreign countries like North Korea or Venezuela without a first attack against the U.S. by that country
- Pursuing friendly relations with all foreign countries, irrespective of the U.S.' opinions of their leaders or economic structure
- Rejoining the Iran nuclear deal.

=== Civil rights ===
The campaign sought to reduce the number of intelligence agencies from 17, including the abolition of the National Security Agency, as well as a U.S. withdrawal from the Five Eyes network, the ending of the PRISM surveillance program, and repealing of the Patriot Act and the Espionage Act. The campaign viewed many of these programs and organizations to be a 'trampling' of Americans' civil rights "in the rush to enhance security following 9/11". Whistleblowers Chelsea Manning, Edward Snowden, John C. Kiriakou, Julian Assange, Reality Winner, and Terry Albury would be given pardons and some would receive the Presidential Medal of Freedom. The campaign also focuses on "full equality for all of America's LGBTQIA+ people, with a special focus on transgender rights." This included an amendment to the Civil Rights Act of 1964 with the addition of a ban on discrimination due to "sexual orientation and/or gender identity in employment, housing, public accommodations, public education, federal funding, and credit", honoring transgender rights activist Marsha P. Johnson and author James Baldwin with the Presidential Medal of Freedom, banning conversion therapy nationwide and making the operation of a conversion therapy clinic a crime.

=== Political reform ===
The campaign wanted to abolish the Electoral College and replace it with a system of direct election. The platform stated it was because "[it] has been responsible for two Presidents within the last three winning an election without winning a majority of the votes", referring to the 2000 election of George W. Bush and the 2016 election of Donald Trump, and also because it "was a tool originally created to suppress democracy; historically, it has empowered slavers and segregationists." The campaign also stated it "distorts democracy" by giving weight to voters like Floridian Cuban-Americans and Iowan farmers and reducing the weight of voters in cities.

The campaign also wants to put all elections under Congressional oversight, citing "restrictive" voter ID laws and the election fraud in the 2018 election of Representative Mark Harris in North Carolina, as well as registering all U.S. citizens for voting once they turn 18, instituting national ranked choice voting, adopting the Wyoming Rule, and passing an amendment that would make voting power in the Senate proportional to state population. The campaign also supported a 12-year term limit for Supreme Court justices.

== Media coverage ==
Coverage of the campaign was largely limited to online and print journalism. Interviews with Gravel and Williams appeared in a segment of the April 18, 2019 episode of Vice News Tonight. On April 10, 2019, a piece entitled "Mike Gravel's Plan to Rock the Democratic Primary" appeared in The Atlantic. A long profile of the campaign as well as Oks and Williams appeared in the June 9, 2019 issue of The New York Times Magazine.

Articles regarding the campaign appeared in Splinter News, Vox, Rolling Stone, Current Affairs, Jezebel and Politico, among other outlets.

Additionally, Gravel discussed his candidacy in television news interviews. On June 10, 2019, he appeared on CBS News and related how he gave Oks and Williams his Twitter account, while they gave him "veto power, which I've only exercised once, by warning them about rough language." In the same interview, he also praised Oks and Williams and called them "unbelievably precocious."

The publication Jacobin interviewed Gravel in June 2019, referring to him as "the anti-Joe Biden".

== Controversies ==
Mike Gravel's exploratory committee was immediately met with allegations of Gravel being a 9/11 truther, having called for a new investigation into the 9/11 attacks in 2011. He has also allegedly associated with alleged antisemites and Holocaust deniers, including attending conferences sponsored by Lyndon LaRouche and appearing on the podcast of Kevin Barrett. The Gravel campaign replied to these reports stating Gravel "totally, unequivocally disavow" Barrett and that Gravel was "not familiar with his statements on the Holocaust or the Jewish community". The campaign added that Gravel had appeared on these mediums for the sake of getting exposure of his ideas to as many people as possible, and noted Gravel himself had not made any of these statements, as well as the influence American Jews had on Gravel's political ideology.
