= Ardsley High School =

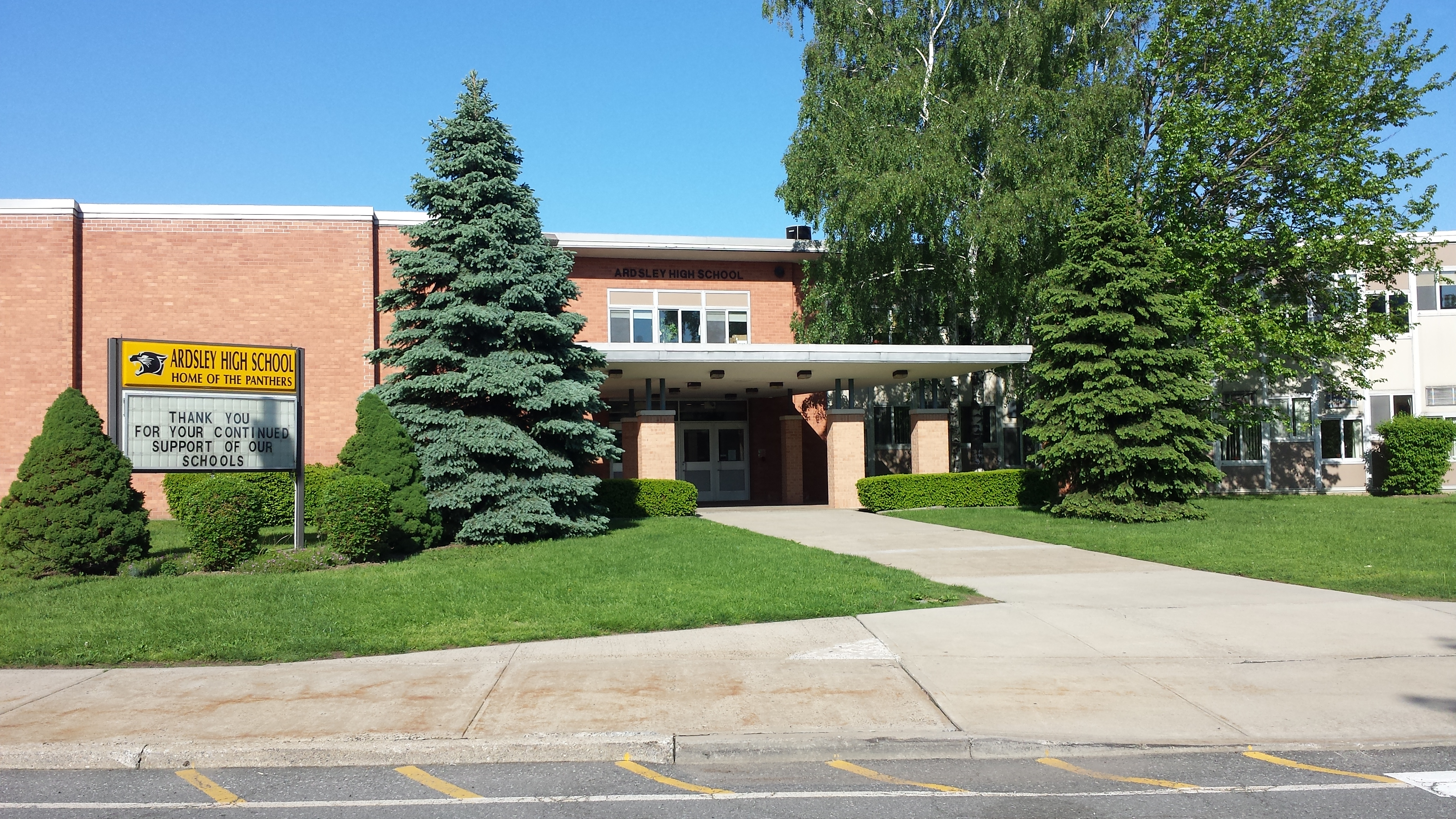

Location
- 300 Farm Road; Ardsley, New York 10502; United States; 41°01′17″N 73°49′57″W

Information
- Type: Public high school
- Established: 1957
- School district: Ardsley Union Free School District
- Principal: Danielle Trippodo
- Teaching staff: 74.20 (FTE)
- Enrollment: 701 (2019–20)
- Student to teacher ratio: 9.45
- Athletics conference: Section 1 (NYSPHSAA)
- Mascot: Panther
- Colors: Blue and gold
- Website: ahs.ardsleyschools.org

Ardsley High School is an American public high school located in Ardsley, New York, in the New York City metropolitan area. It is a part of the Ardsley Union Free School District.

The school was established in 1957 and serves students in grades 9–12. An extension onto the school was completed in 2006. As of 2023, the school principal is Danielle Trippodo.

== History ==
From the years 1920–1935, the population in Ardsley doubled; therefore, an addition was added to the "old" high school in 1925. The addition included more classrooms and a gym. By the second population boom during the post World War II years, the Ardsley School District sought to build a new high school on the former Lewisohn Estate on Washington Hill, which burned to the ground in 1957. Ardsley High School opened its door to students for the 1957–1958 school year.

== Athletics ==
Ardsley competes in Section 1 of the New York State Public High School Athletic Association.

Sports offered at Ardsley include:

- Cross Country
- Football
- Soccer
- Swimming
- Tennis
- Volleyball
- Basketball
- Bowling
- Fencing
- Skiing
- Track (both winter and spring)
- Wrestling
- Baseball
- Golf
- Lacrosse

== Notable alumni ==
- Richard Brodsky — New York State Assemblyman
- Naomi E. Goldstein — clinical psychologist
- Jesse McCartney — Grammy-nominated pop singer, actor, and songwriter
- Devi Nampiaparampil — physician, researcher, and television medicine correspondent
- Gil Parris — Grammy-nominated rock, blues, jazz, and pop guitarist
- Peter Riegert (Class of 1964) — actor, director, and screenwriter
- Vic Ruggiero — musician, songwriter, and producer
- Mark Zuckerberg — co-founder, executive chairman, and chief executive officer of Meta Platforms
