= Ardsley Union Free School District =

School district in the U.S. state of New York

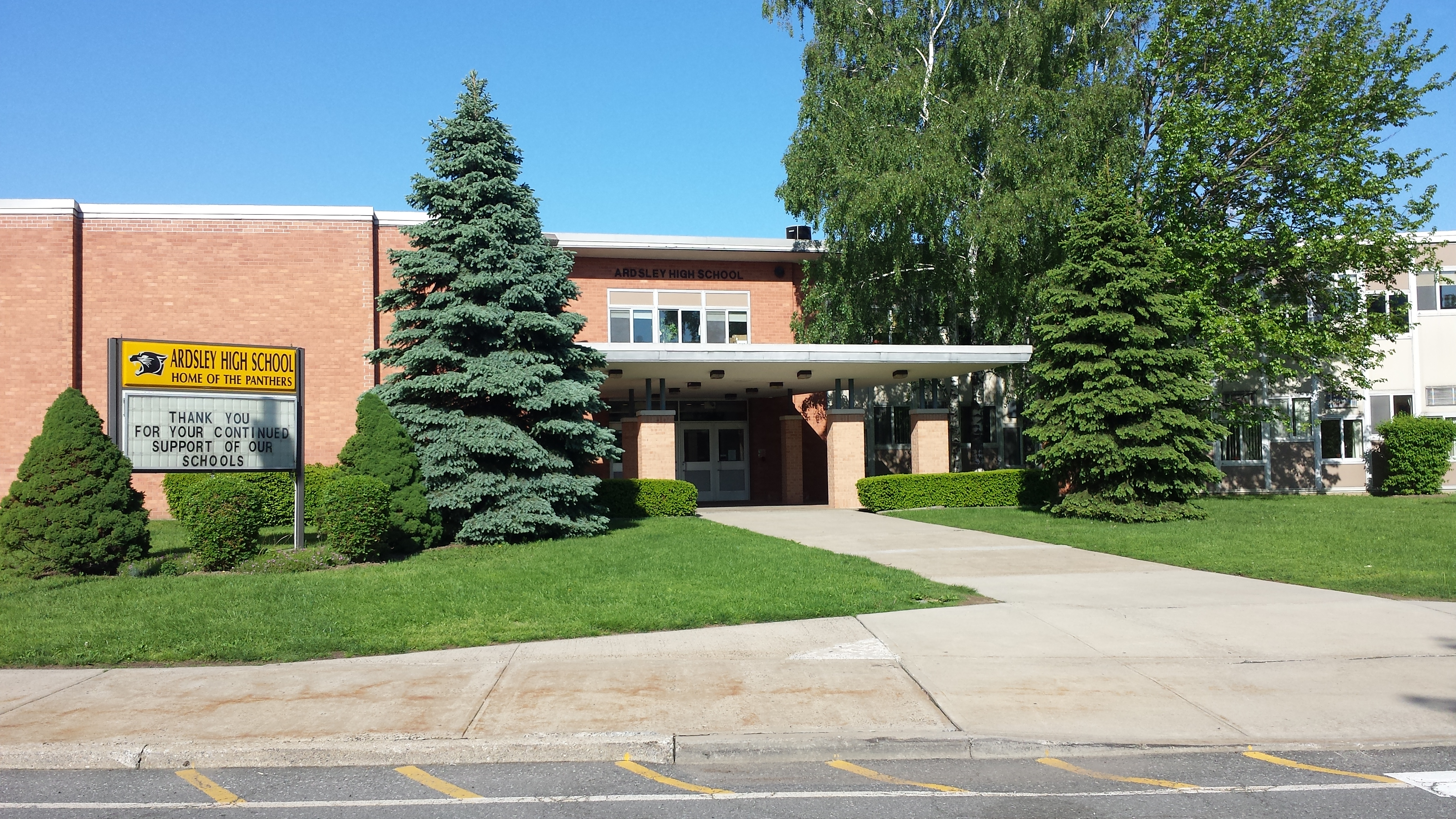
Ardsley High School

Ardsley Union Free School District (AUFSD) is a school district headquartered in Ardsley, New York, United States. The district has three schools serving grades K–12.

== History ==
In 2018 it had about 2,000 students.

Around 2003 Lauren Allan, who attended AFUSD schools, began working as an administrator in the district, and she later became its superintendent. In 2018 Allan resigned and was replaced by Ryan Schoenfeld, previously employed by the Amherst Central School District.

== Schools ==
- Concord Road Elementary School (K–4)
- Ardsley Middle School (5–8)
- Ardsley High School (9–12)
