= Luna Park Historic District =

Historic district in West Virginia, United States

- U.S. National Register of Historic Places
- U.S. Historic district
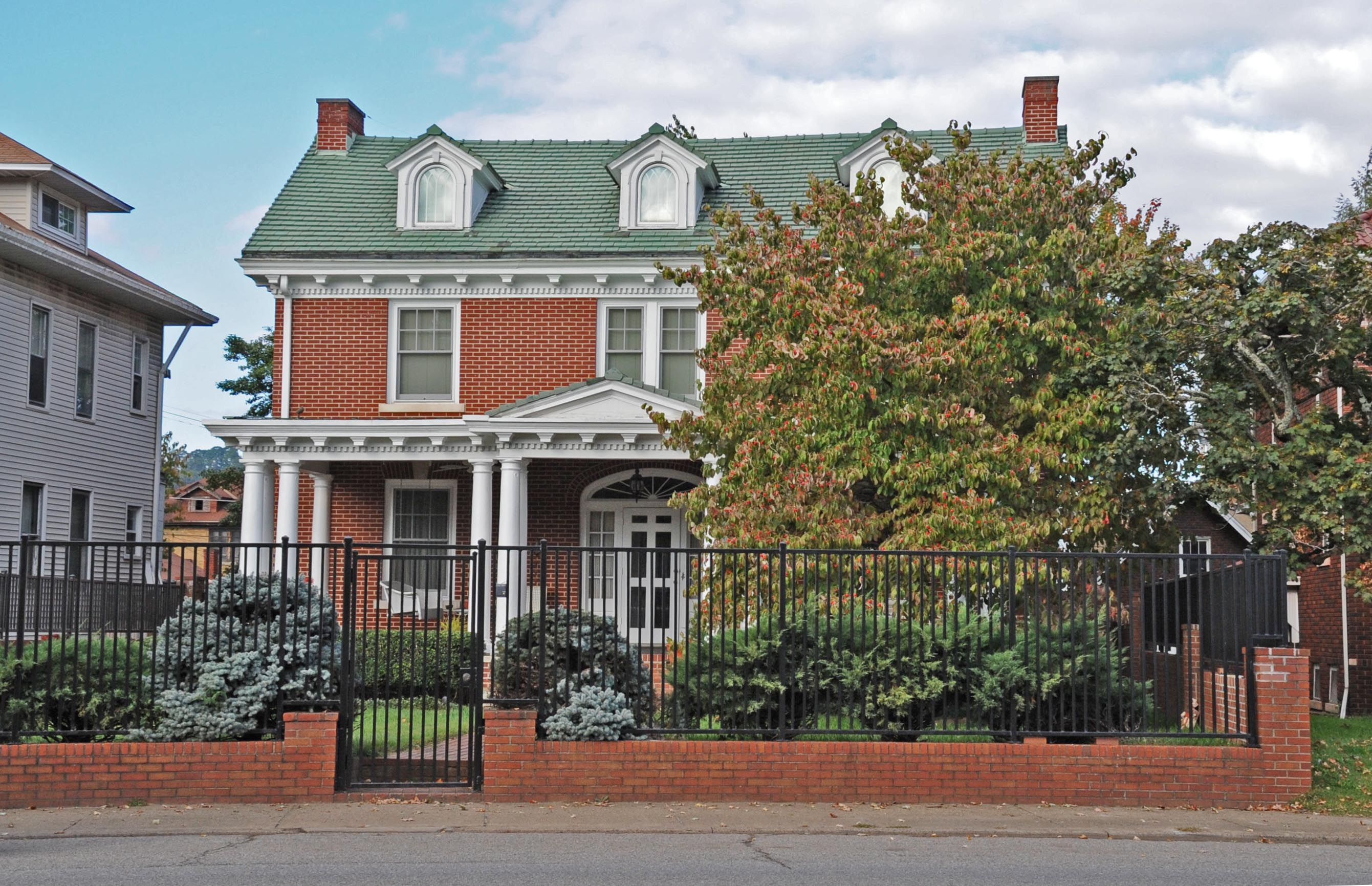

- Location within West Virginia Location within the United States
- Location: Roughly bounded by Main St., Glenwood Ave., Delaware Ave., & Kanawha Blvd. W., West Side (Charleston), West Virginia
- Coordinates: 38°21′41″N 81°39′11″W
- Area: 40 acres (16 ha)
- Built: c. 1910-1945
- Architect: Norman, John C. Norman (300/2/4/6/8 Park Avenue); H. Rus Warne (180 Grant Street) others
- Architectural style: American Foursquare, American Craftsman/Bungalow, Tudor Revival, Colonial Revival, Dutch Colonial Revival
- NRHP reference No.: 12000181
- Added to NRHP: April 3, 2012

Luna Park Historic District is a federally designated national historic district located in the West Side neighborhood of Charleston, Kanawha County, West Virginia. It encompasses 444 contributing buildings in a predominantly residential section of Charleston. The majority of the homes in the district were constructed in the mid to late 1925s and early 1930s and a portion of the district was the location of a local amusement park, Luna Park, from 1912 until 1923. The houses reflect a variety of popular architectural styles including American Foursquare, American Craftsman / Bungalow, Tudor Revival, and Colonial Revival, including Dutch Colonial Revival.

It was listed on the National Register of Historic Places in 2012.
