= Red Rocks Park =

Mountain park in Jefferson County, Colorado, US

- Red Rocks Park District
- U.S. National Register of Historic Places
- U.S. National Historic Landmark
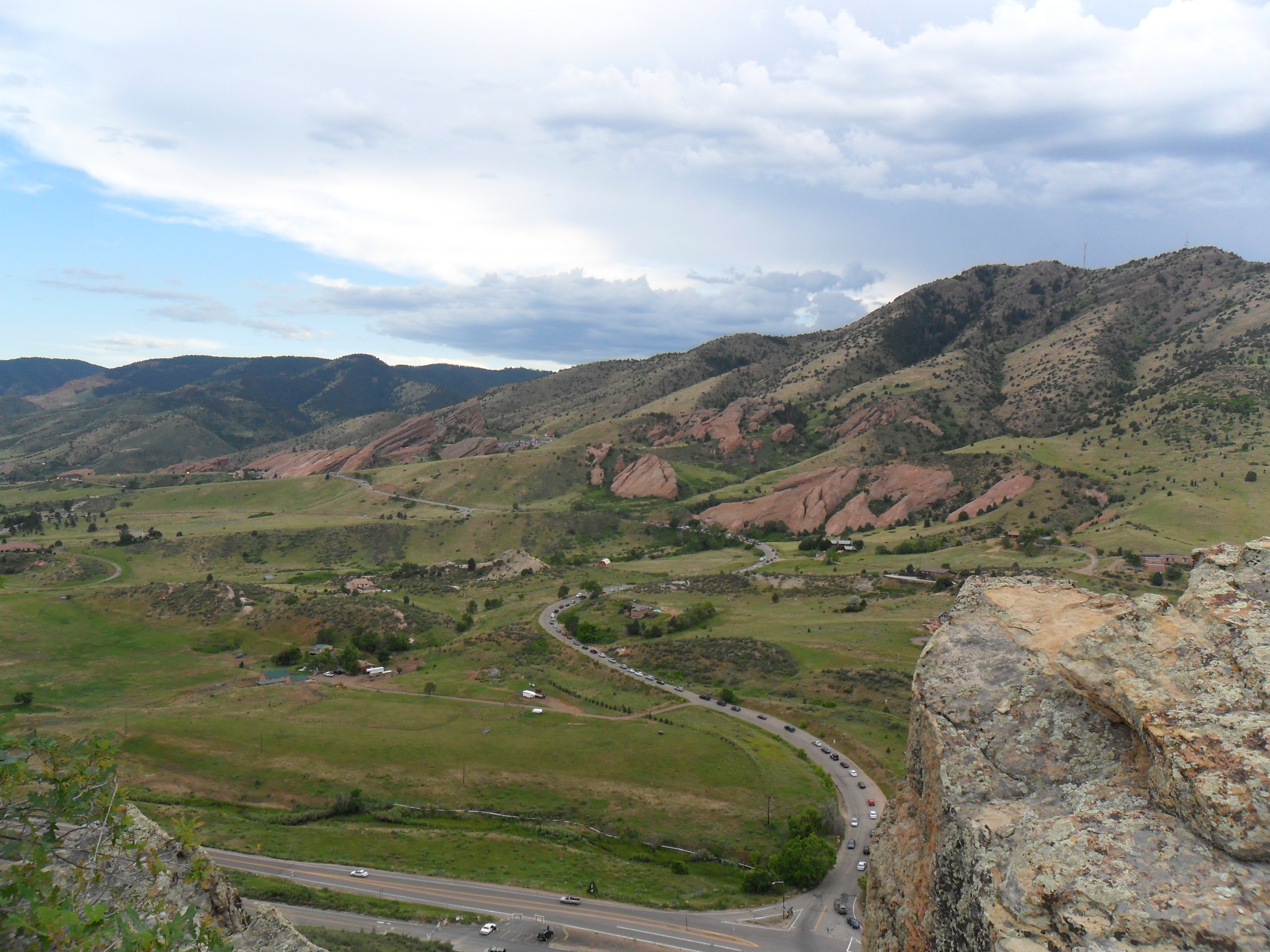
- Red Rocks area from Dakota Ridge

- Location within Colorado Location within the United States
- Location: Morrison, Colorado
- Coordinates: 39°39′41″N 105°12′29″W
- Area: 659 acres (267 ha) (landmarked area)
- Built: 1928; 98 years ago
- Architect: Hoyt, Burnham; Rosche, W. R.
- Architectural style: Pueblo
- MPS: Denver Mountain Parks MPS
- NRHP reference No.: 90000725

Significant dates
- Added to NRHP: May 18, 1990
- Designated NHL: August 4, 2015

Red Rocks Park is a mountain park in Jefferson County, Colorado, owned and maintained by the city of Denver as part of the Denver Mountain Parks system. The park is known for its very large red sandstone outcrops. Many of these rock formations within the park have names, from the mushroom-shaped Seat of Pluto to the inclined Cave of the Seven Ladders. The most visited rocks, around Red Rocks Amphitheatre, are Creation Rock to the north, Ship Rock to the south, and Stage Rock to the east.

The red sandstone found throughout Red Rocks Park is geologically identified as belonging to the Fountain Formation. Other Colorado examples of Fountain Formation geology include nearby Roxborough State Park, Garden of the Gods near Colorado Springs, and the Flatirons near Boulder. The rocks were formed about 290-296 million years ago when the Ancestral Rocky Mountains were eroded during the Pennsylvanian epoch. Later, uplift during the Laramide orogeny tilted the rocks to the angle at which they sit today.

An Army expedition led by Stephen Long discovered present-day Red Rocks in 1820. The park was in times far past a favored campsite of the Ute tribe for it provided natural cover from the elements. Its earliest known name was the Garden of the Angels, reputedly given to it on July 4, 1870, by Martin Van Buren Luther, a pioneer Colorado judge. In 1872, Marion Burts became the first recorded owner of Red Rocks. He sold it to Leonard H. Eicholtz, a civil engineer who helped build the Union Pacific Railway and who developed the property into a park in 1878. Eicholtz added roads, trails, picnic grounds, steps, and ladders so visitors could explore the park. In 1906, Eicholtz sold Red Rocks to famed editor John Brisben Walker which he purchased with proceeds from his sale of Cosmopolitan magazine; Walker organized concerts on a temporary platform at the Garden of the Titans. Known however by the folk name of Red Rocks since the area was settled, it was formally given that name when Denver acquired it in 1928 from Walker.

Within the park boundaries is the Red Rocks Amphitheatre, a venue used since 1941. The Amphitheater was designed by Burnam Hoyt within the area between two massive slabs of Red stone (Ship Rock and Creation Rock).

== Park construction ==
Denver Mayor Ben Stapleton resisted developing the already beautiful Red Rocks but the city used Depression-era New Deal funding and resources to build out the park, as part of the development of the Denver Mountain Parks system. City planner George Cranmer oversaw the development, securing federal funding and establishment of a Civilian Conservation Corps (CCC) camp at Mount Morrison to facilitate the construction of the park's features. CCC crews were responsible for building out the early roads and the amphitheater, as well as a Pueblo-style concession stand. The park along with surviving CCC camp (which is one of the best preserved of such camps) were designated a National Historic Landmark in 2015.

== Trails ==
There are several short, pedestrian-only trails in the park: Funicular Trail, Geologic Overlook Trail, Mt. Vernon Creek Trail, Red Rocks Trail, and the Trading Post Trail. Other multi-use trails are open to mountain bikes, horses, and leashed dogs.

== Gallery ==
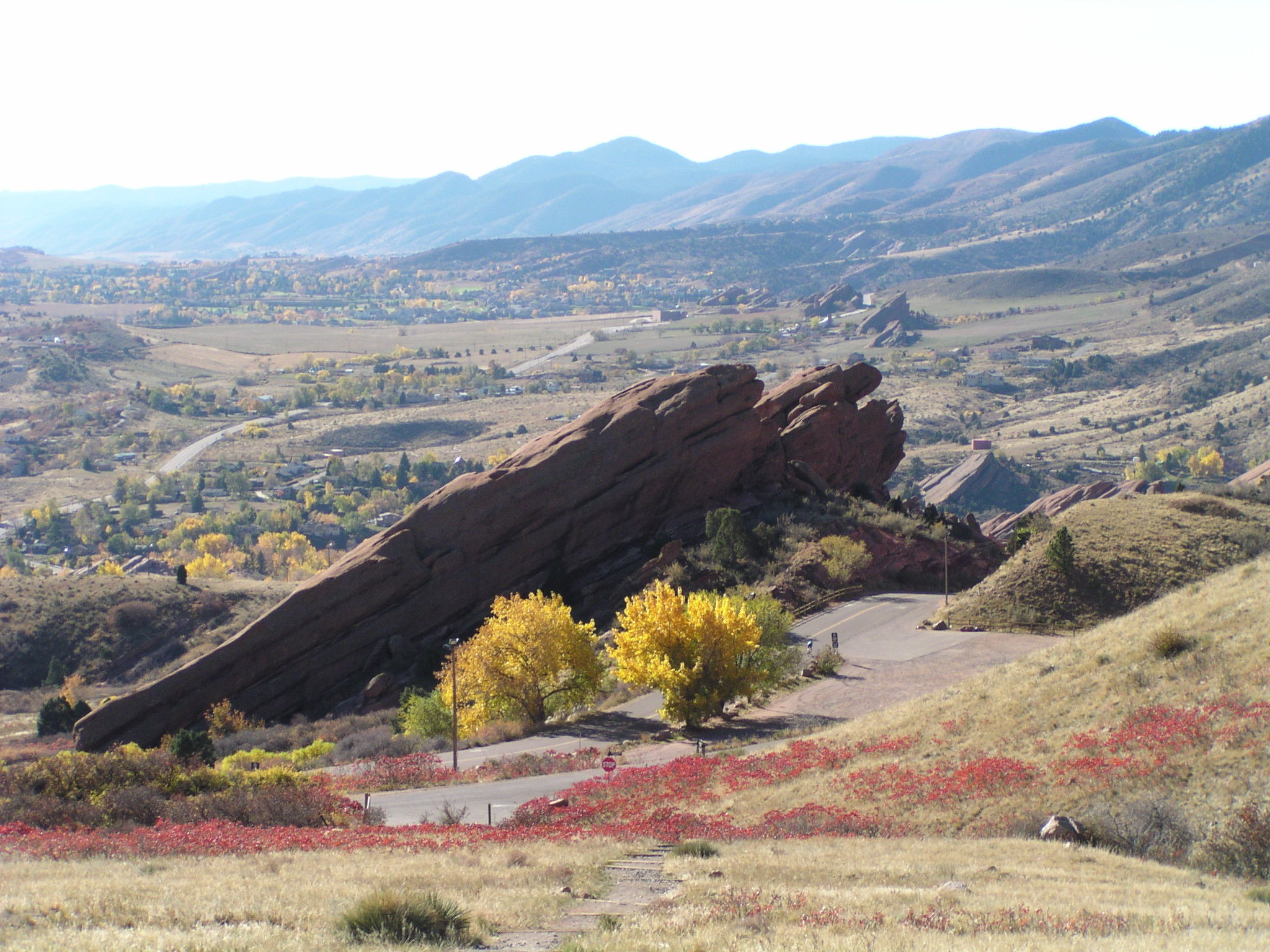
Layered feature in Red Rocks Park, Colorado. Features in the Red Rocks region were caused by the uplift of mountains.

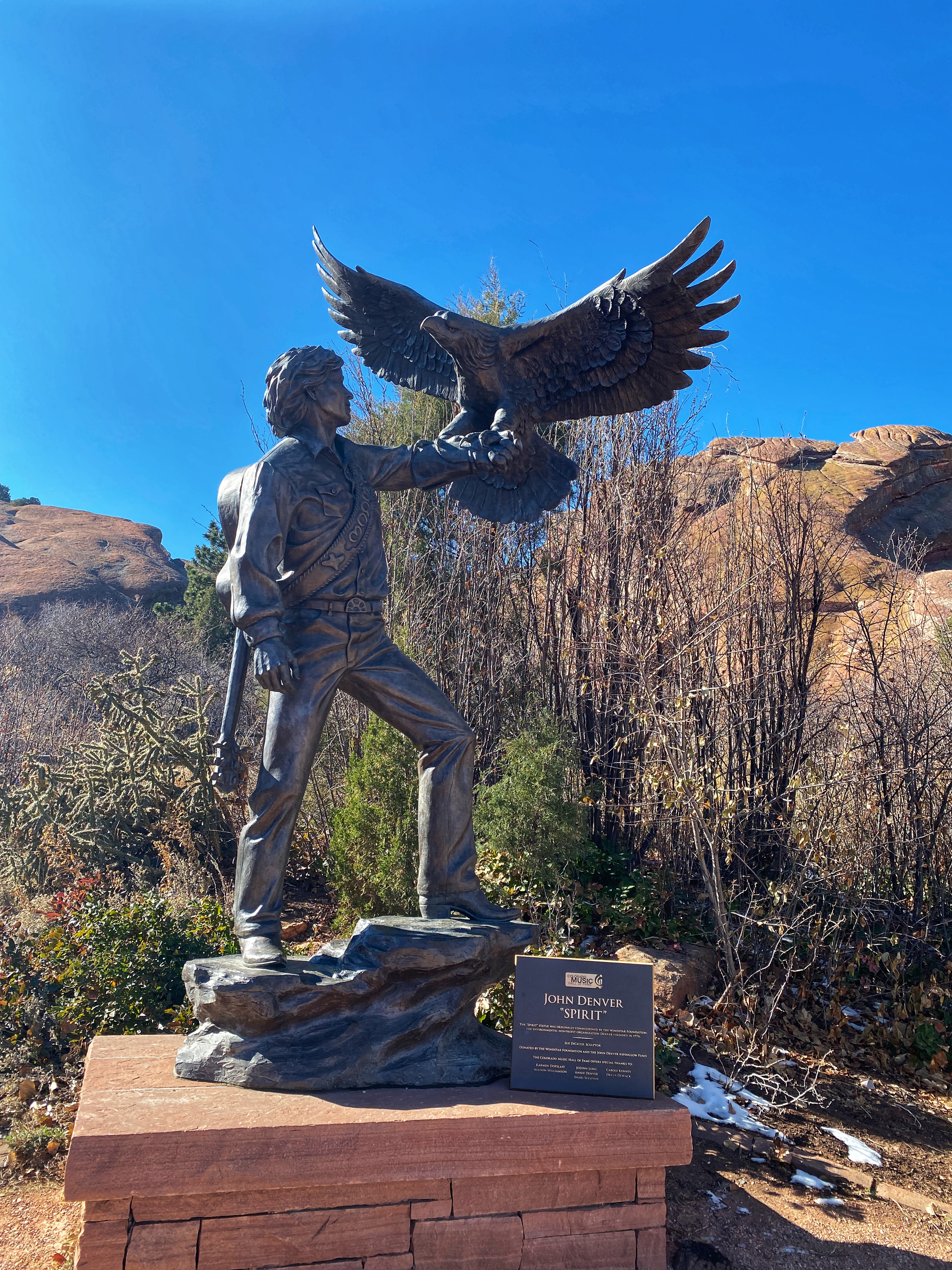
John Denver "Spirit" statue

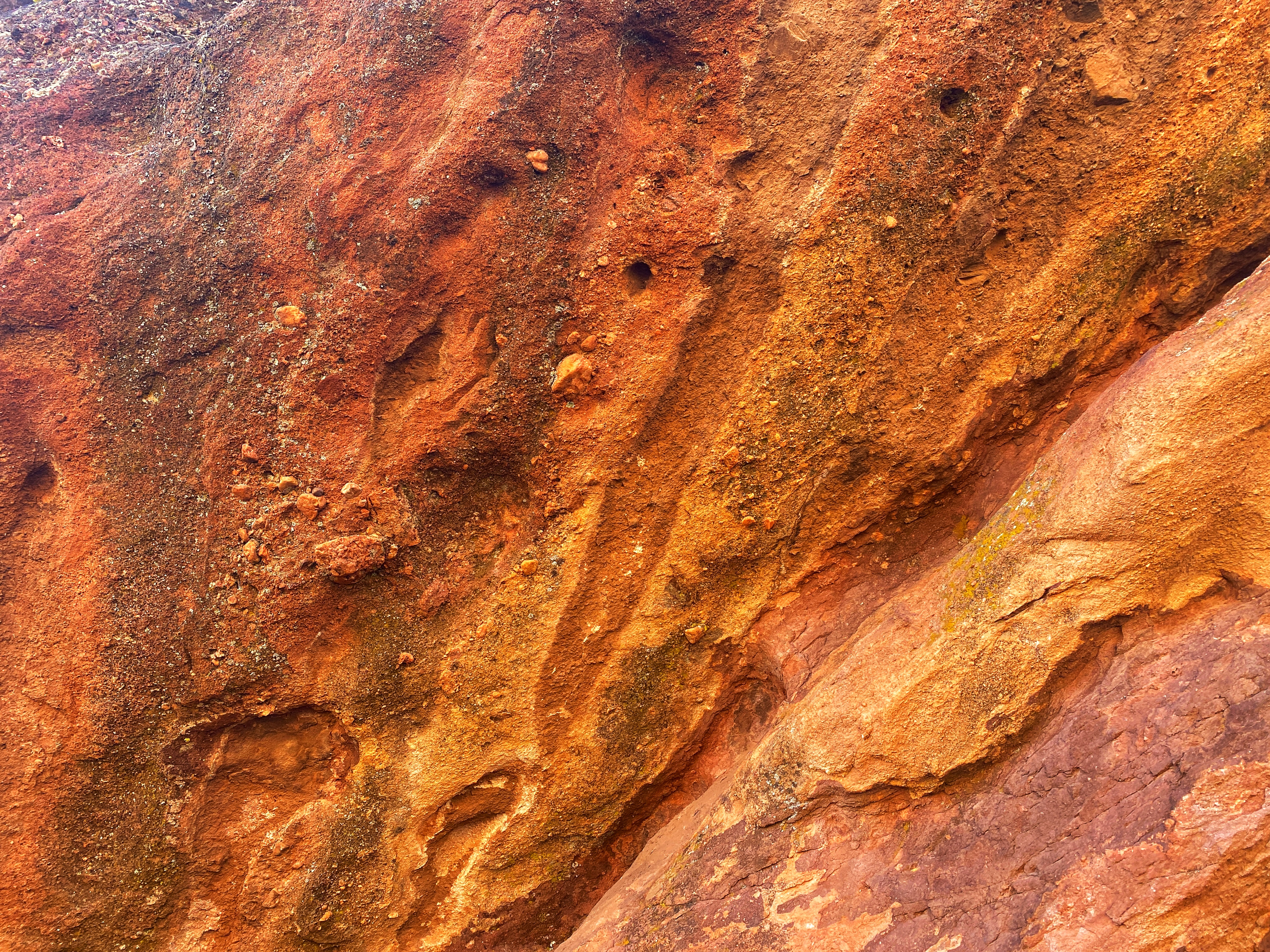
Close-up of red rock

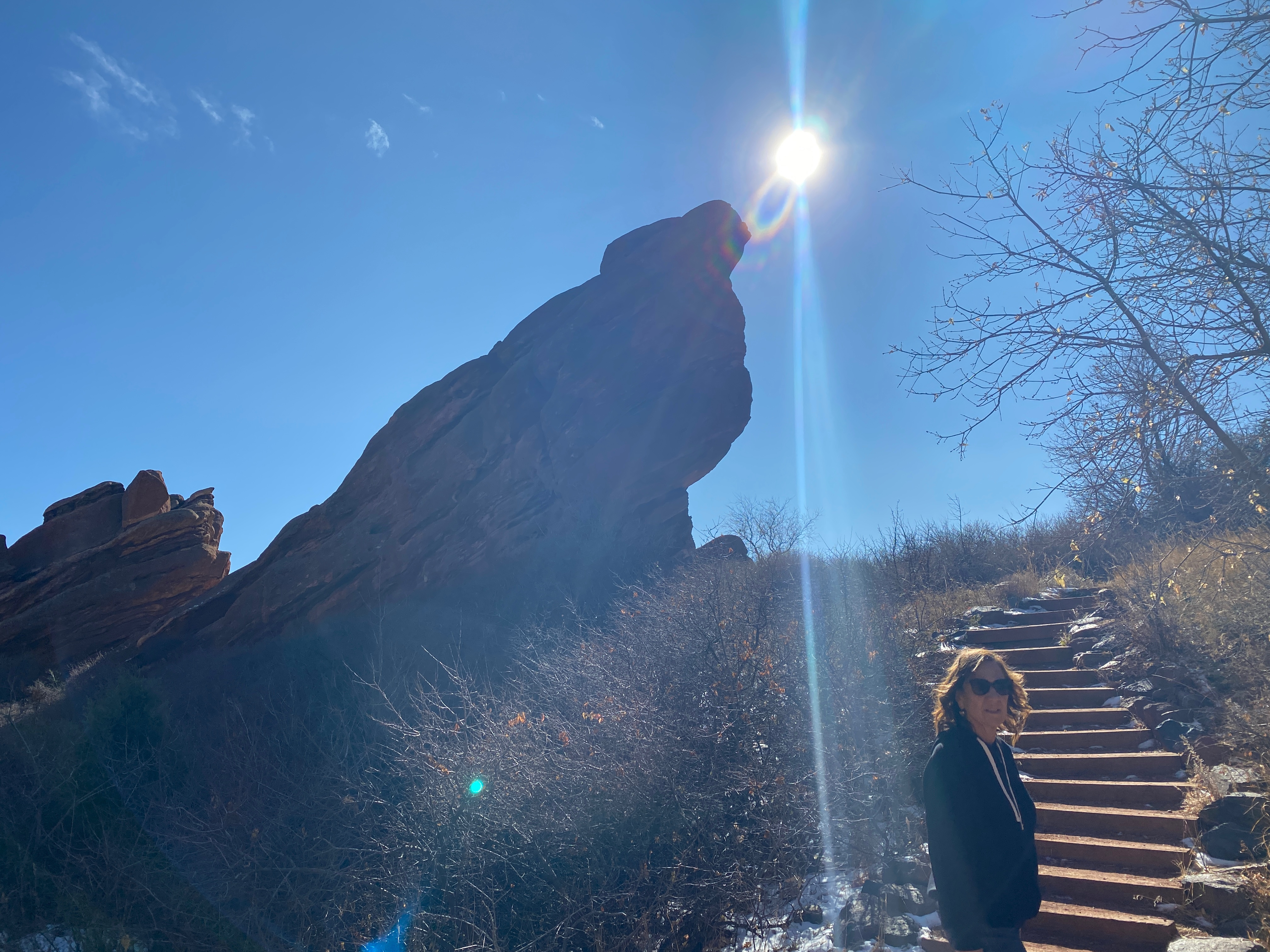
Sunburst on trail

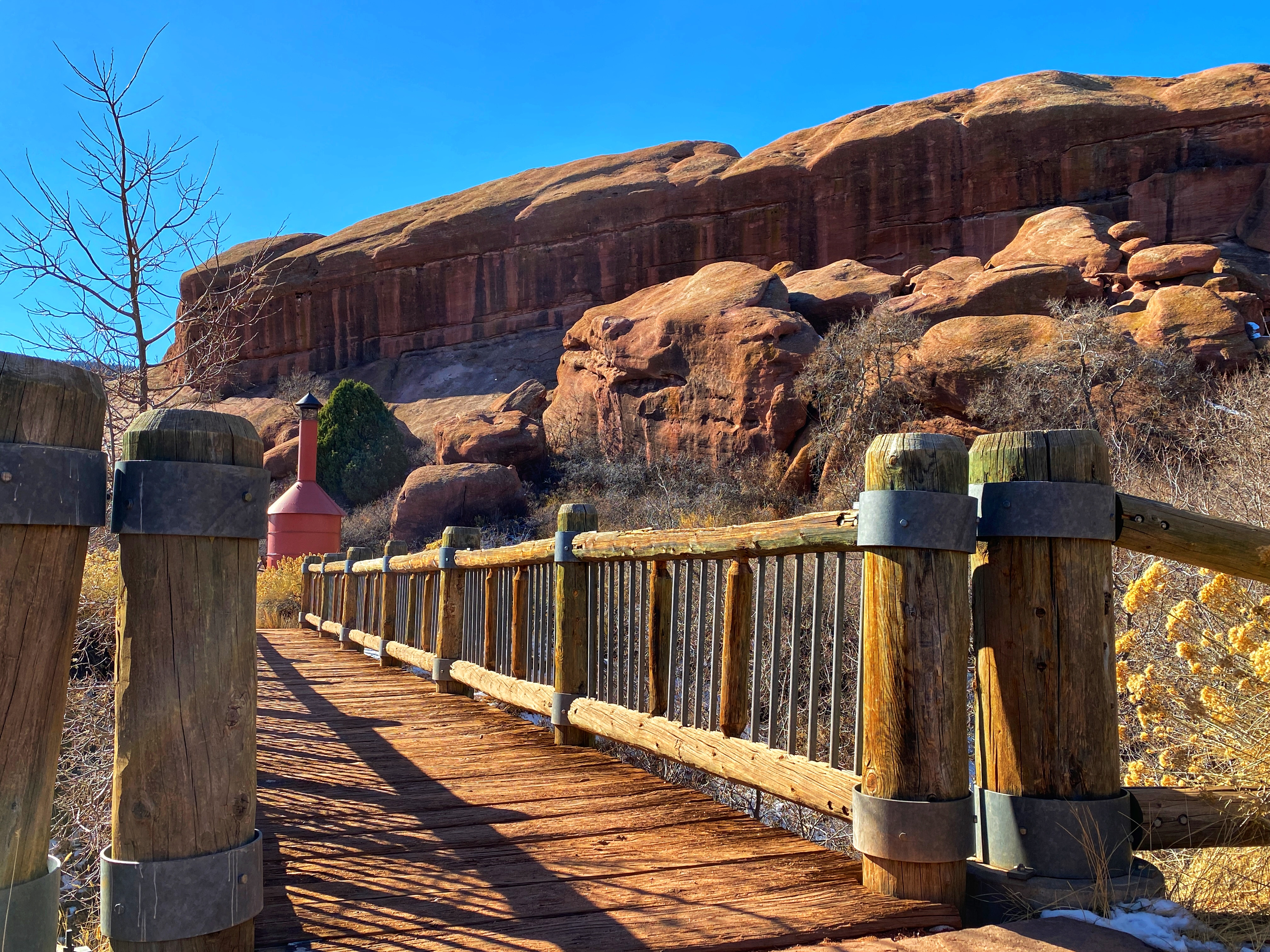
Bridge in Red Rocks Park

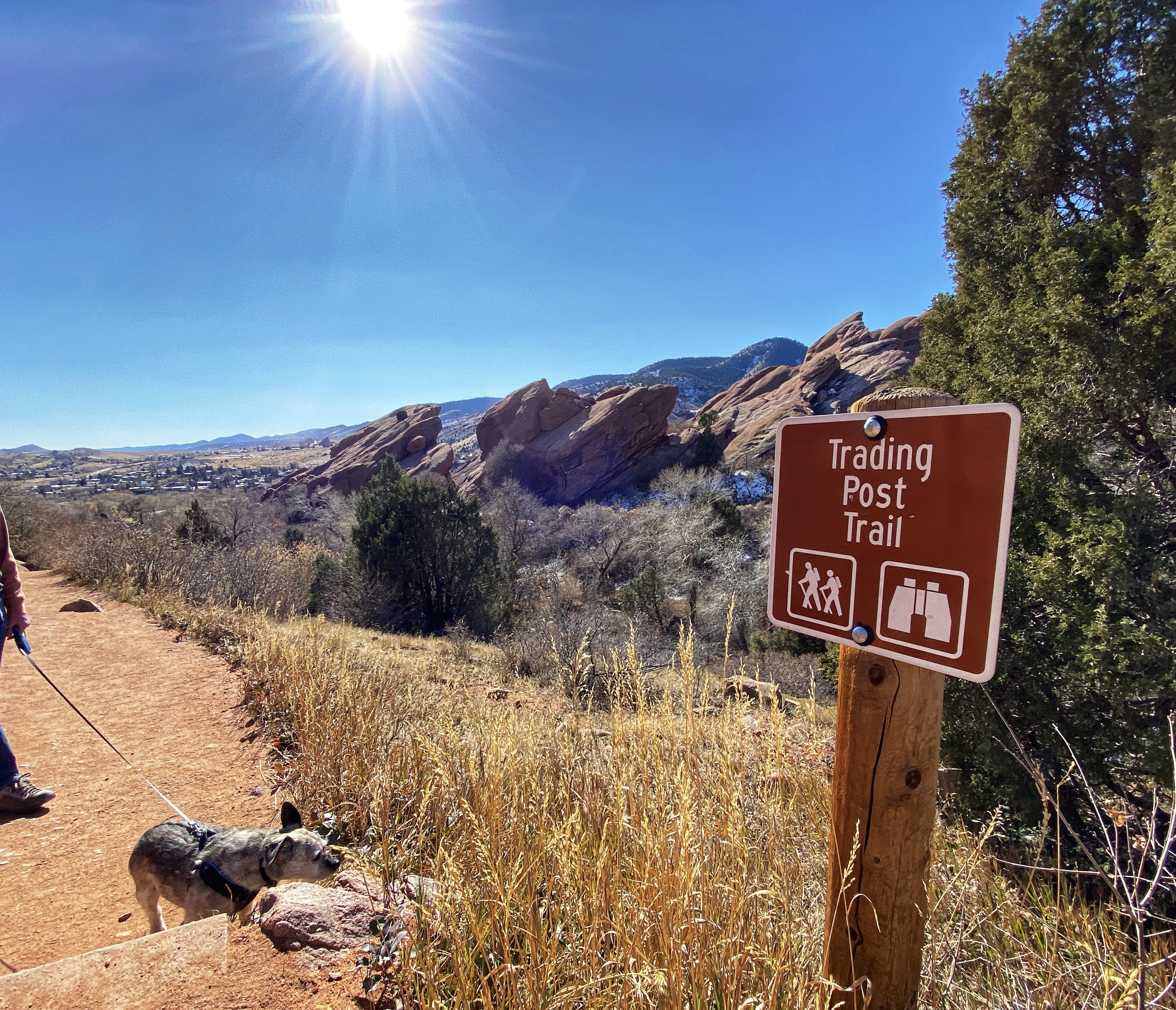
Trading Post Trail sign

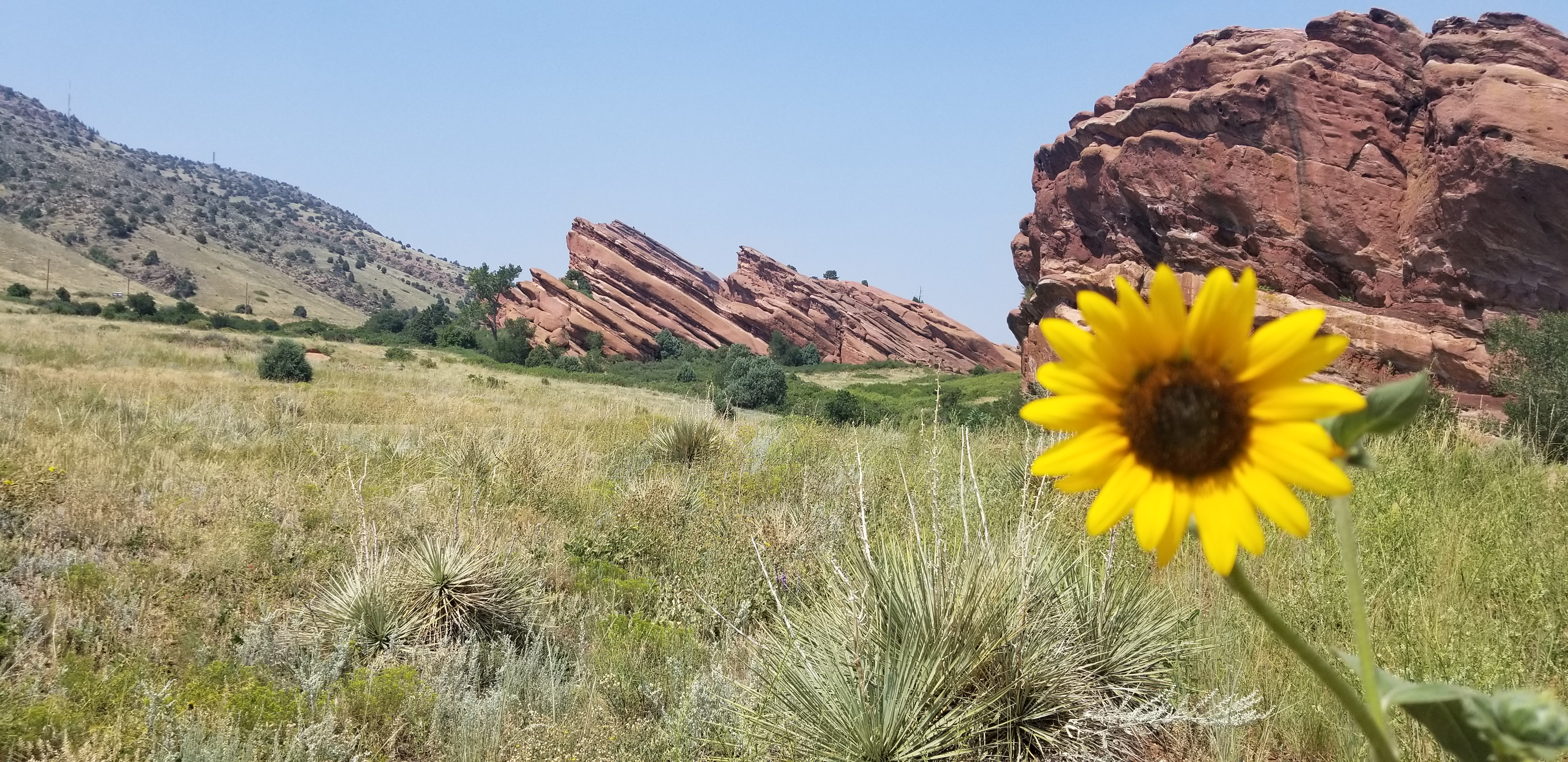
Red Rocks Park

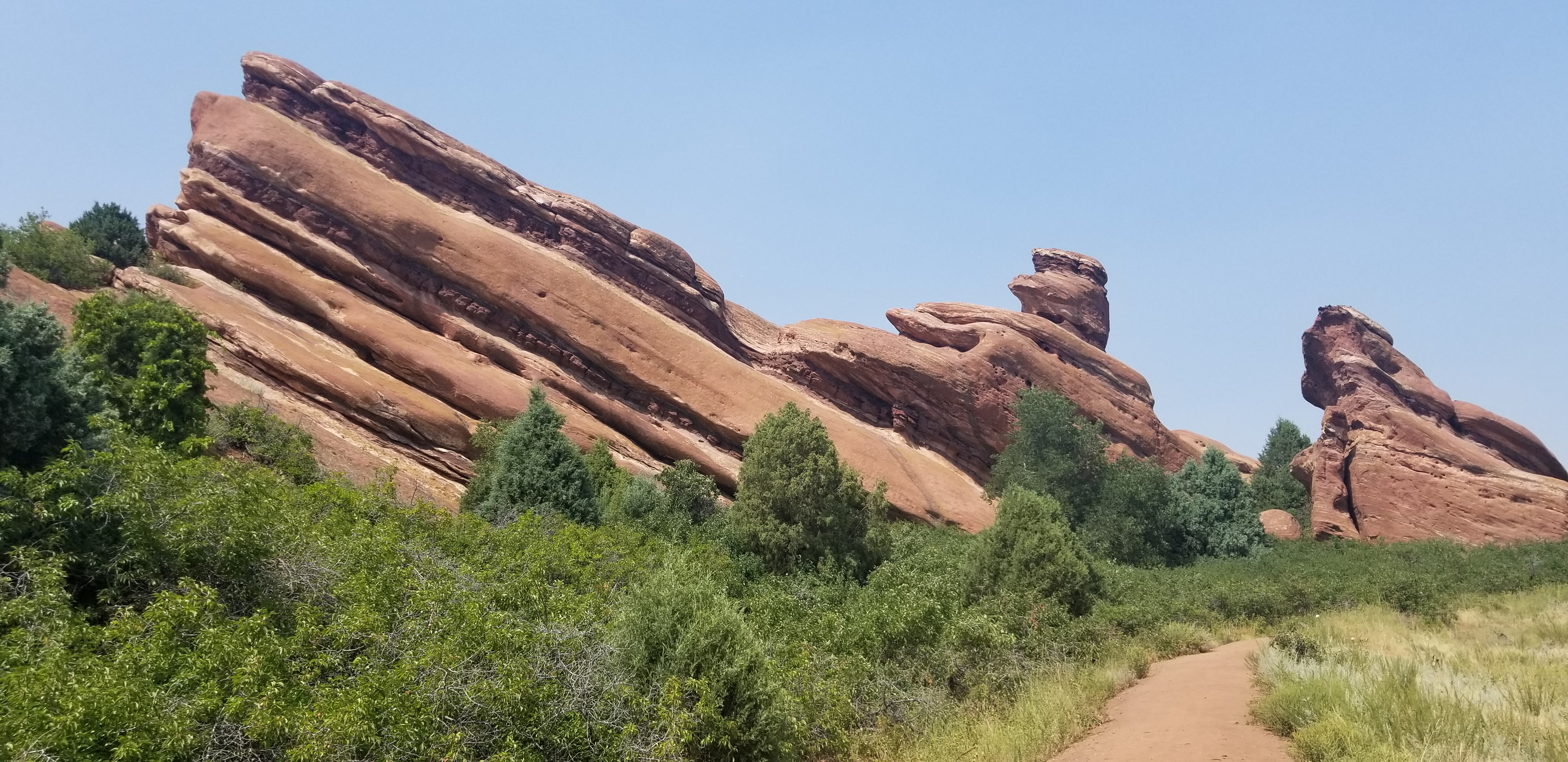
Red Rocks Park in Denver

== See also ==
- List of National Historic Landmarks in Colorado
- National Register of Historic Places listings in Jefferson County, Colorado
- Willowbrook Amphitheatre
- List of contemporary amphitheatres
- Live at Red Rocks (disambiguation)
- Roxborough State Park and its Archaeological District
