= West Side (Charleston), West Virginia =

West Side
- Neighborhood
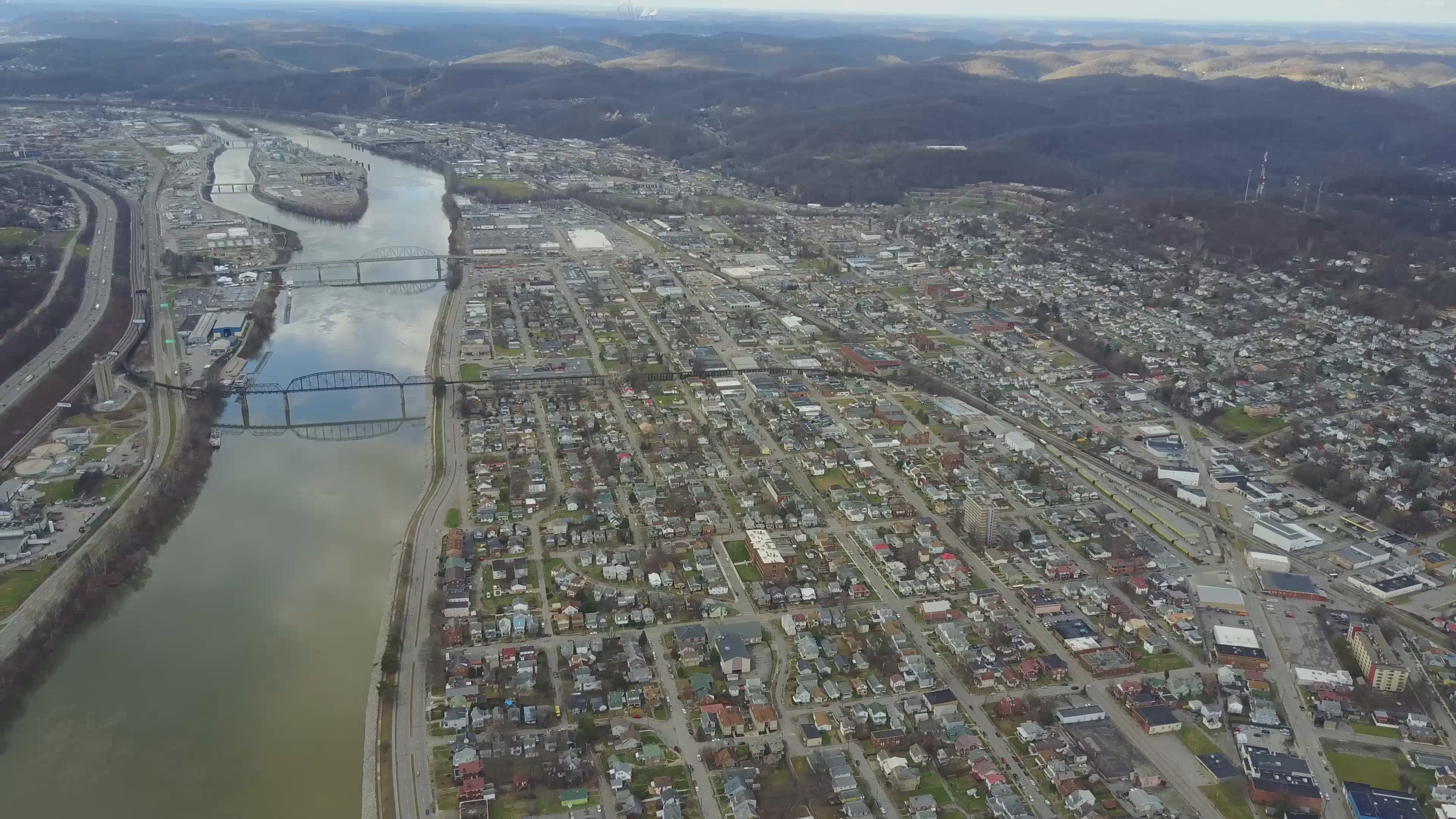
- Aerial view of Charleston's West Side neighborhood.
- Interactive map of West Side
- Country: United States
- State: West Virginia
- County: Kanawha
- Neighborhood of: Charleston
- Time zone: UTC−5 (Eastern)
- Zip Code: 25302
- Area codes: 304, 681

The West Side is a neighborhood in the city of Charleston in Kanawha County, West Virginia, United States, containing about 9,900 residents. Located along the Kanawha River and the Elk River, the West Side is bounded by U.S. Route 60 to the north (W Washington St) and west (Patrick Street), the Kanawha River to the south and by the Elk River and Interstate 64 to the east.

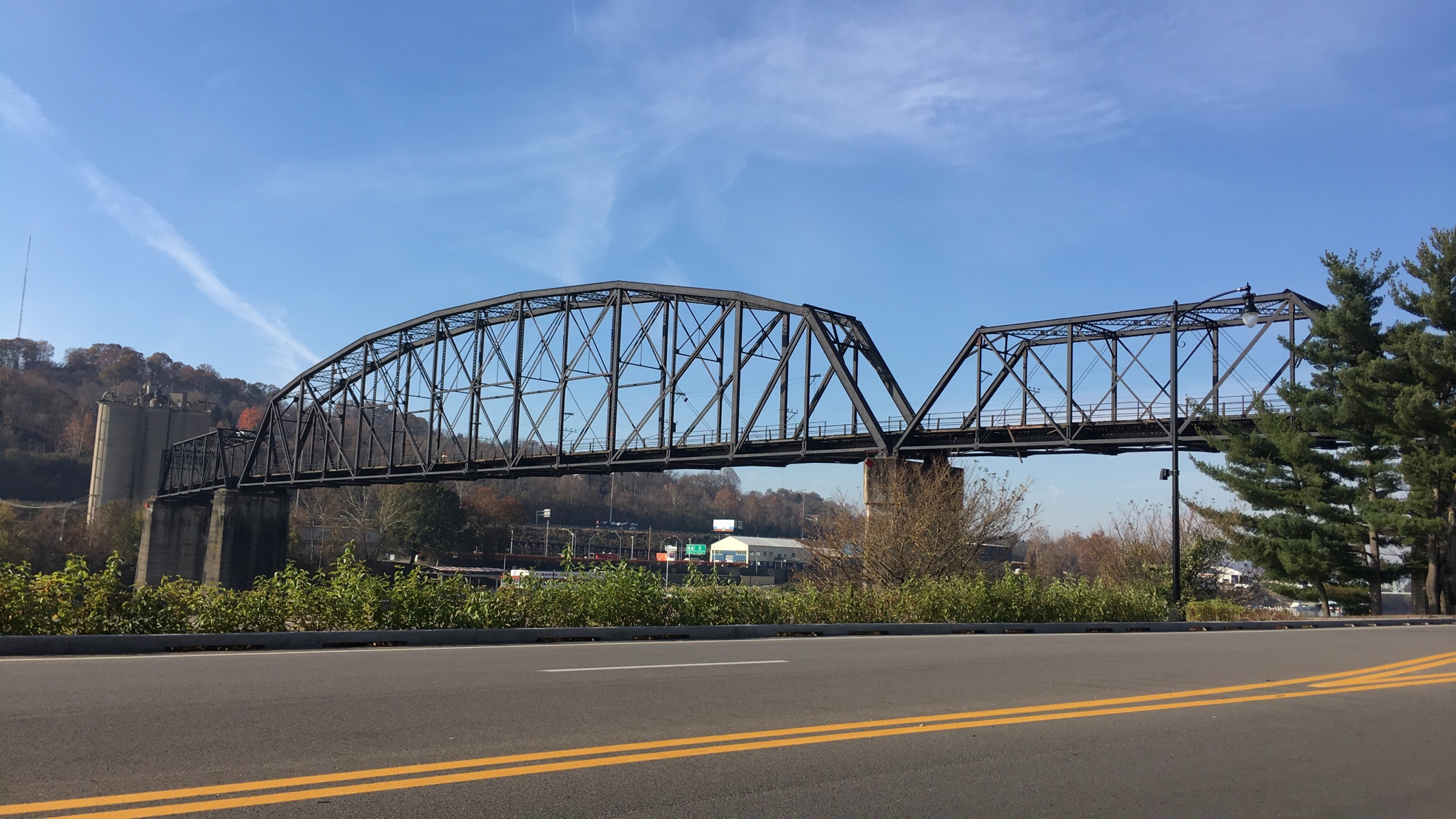
Abandoned train trestle bridge over the Kanawha River along Kanawha Boulevard West.

Like much of Charleston, the West Side suffers from large tracts of urban decay with 31% of West Side buildings vacant as of 2019 as Charleston overall has lost roughly 45% of its peak population and is part of the Rust Belt. Over 40% of children on the West Side are living in poverty, more than double the national average (17.5%).

== History ==
The area was developed largely by John Brisben Walker in the early 1870s. The Rocky Mountain News tells the story as follows:

[Walker] heard Opportunity’s loud knocks when the West Virginia capital was changed from Wheeling to Charleston. Rushing to the new capital, Walker bought all the farm land along the river and laid it off in town lots. Selling this netted him two million dollars... BUT the speculation that had made him rich, turned about and left him penniless. Fickle legislators voted the capital back to Wheeling, and this along with the panic of 73, put a temporary end to Walker’s fortune.

== Points of Interest ==
- Luna Park Historic District - Site of the former Luna Park amusement park. Homes were built mostly after the demolition of the park and are the nicest example of this era on the West Side.
- Magic Island - a public park along the Kanawha River and off of Kanawha Blvd W.
- Elk City - a distinct sub-neighborhood within the West Side, currently undergoing gentrification.
- Shoney's/Big Boy Restaurant Museum - Roadside memorial at the site of the first Big Boy Restaurant.
