= Amzi L. Barber =

American businessman (1843–1909)

Amzi Barber
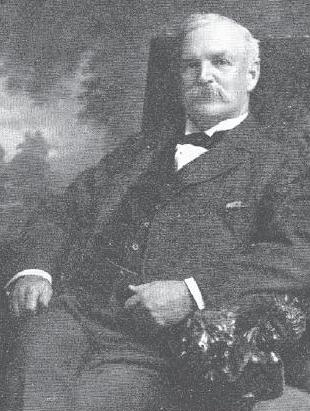
- Amzi L. Barber (c. 1902)
- Born: Amzi Lorenzo Barber; June 22, 1843; Saxtons River, Vermont, U.S.
- Died: April 17, 1909 (aged 65); Ardsley-on-Hudson, New York, U.S.
- Resting place: Oak Hill Cemetery; Washington, D.C.
- Education: Oberlin College; Columbian University
- Board member of: Washington Loan and Trust
- Spouses: Celia M. Bradley (m. 1868; died 1870) Julia Louise Langdon (m. 1871)
- Children: 4
- Relatives: John J. Albright (brother-in-law)

Amzi Lorenzo Barber (June 22, 1843 – April 17, 1909) was a pioneer of the asphalt industry in the United States, and an early participant in the automobile industry as well. He laid many of the roads in Westchester County, New York, and was known as "The Asphalt King".

== Early life ==
Amzi Barber was born on June 22, 1843, in Saxtons River, Vermont. He was the son of Amzi Doolittle Barber (1810–1901), a pastor of the Congregationalist Church, and Nancy Irene Bailey. He grew up in Ohio and attended Oberlin College, graduating in 1867.

== Career ==
After graduating from college, he briefly considered following his father's vocation in the ministry, but instead took a teaching position at Howard University. At Howard, he was "Principal of Normal and Preparatory Department" as well as Professor of Natural Philosophy and Acting Professor of Mathematics until his resignation in 1873. He graduated from Columbian University in Washington, D.C., in 1877.

In late August 1902, the newly formed Consolidated National Bank elected Amzi L. Barber, Lyman G. Bloomingdale, and James Newcomb as directors.

=== Real estate development ===
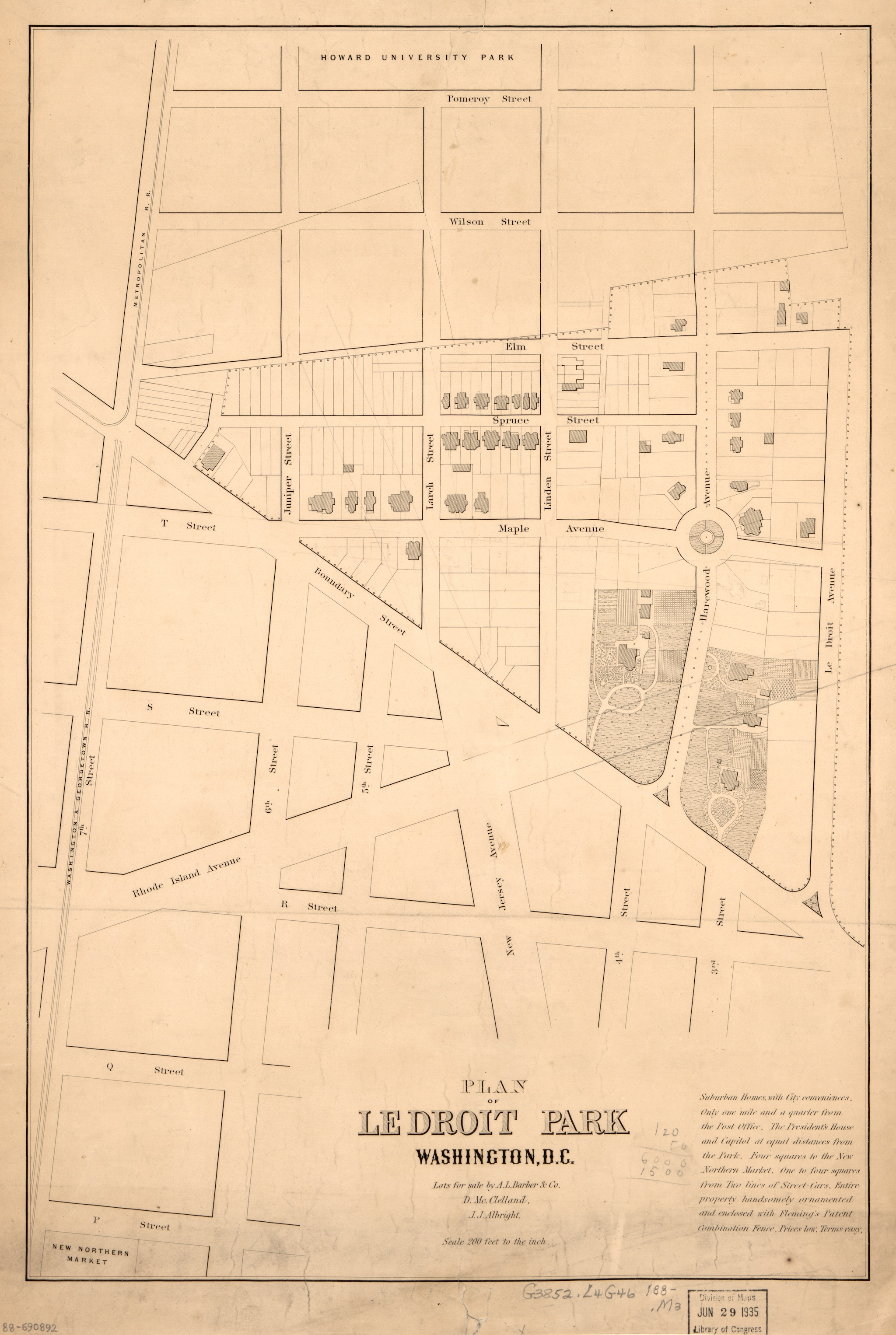
1880 map of LeDroit Park

In 1873, abandoning teaching, Barber developed LeDroit Park, a neighborhood adjacent to Howard University with his brother-in-law, Andrew Langdon (d. 1919). He named the neighborhood after his father-in-law, LeDroict Langdon, but left out the (c) in his name.

It was one of the first suburbs of Washington, and was developed and marketed as a "romantic" neighborhood with narrow tree-lined streets that bore the same names as the trees that shaded them, differing from the street names used in the rest of the city. Extensive focus was placed on the landscaping of this neighborhood, as developers spent a large sum of money to plant flower beds and trees to attract high-profile professionals from the city. It was originally a whites-only neighborhood and was gated with guards to promote the security for its residents. In July 1888, students tore down the fences that separated the neighborhood in protest of its discriminating policies.

In 1875, he developed the Le Droit Building at 800 F Street Northwest in Washington, D.C., across the street from the Old Patent Office Building, which in 2016 houses the Smithsonian American Art Museum and the National Portrait Gallery. As of 2004, the building houses the International Spy Museum.

In 1892, he bought the property known as "Ardsley Towers" in Irvington, NY. The property was built by Cyrus W. Field for his son, whose financial difficulties made a sale of the property necessary. He developed the 400-acre (160 ha) property into Ardsley Park and Ardsley Country Club.

=== Asphalt business ===
In 1878, he became actively involved with asphalt pavement work with his brother-in-law John J. Albright, a Buffalo industrialist. In 1880, Barber partnered with U.S. Senator John Sherman for the purchase and sale of the "Stone" property, then on the outskirts of Washington, D.C. This led to an interest in asphalt for paving city streets, after a government study determined it to be the best available method. He incorporated Barber Asphalt Company in 1883 to produce asphalt, and in 1887, secured a 42-year monopoly concession from the British Government for the Pitch Lake in Trinidad, the largest natural deposit of asphalt in the world. He was also managing director of Trinidad Lake Asphalt Co., Limited, incorporated in London in 1898. Barber moved the Washington-based business to New York City, and it continued to expand, becoming, against Barber's wishes, part of an asphalt trust. By 1900, he had laid over 12 million square yards of Trinidad asphalt pavement in 70 American cities at a cost of $35 million. Barber retired from the business in 1901, just before the trust collapsed, but returned to the industry in 1904.

=== Locomobile ===
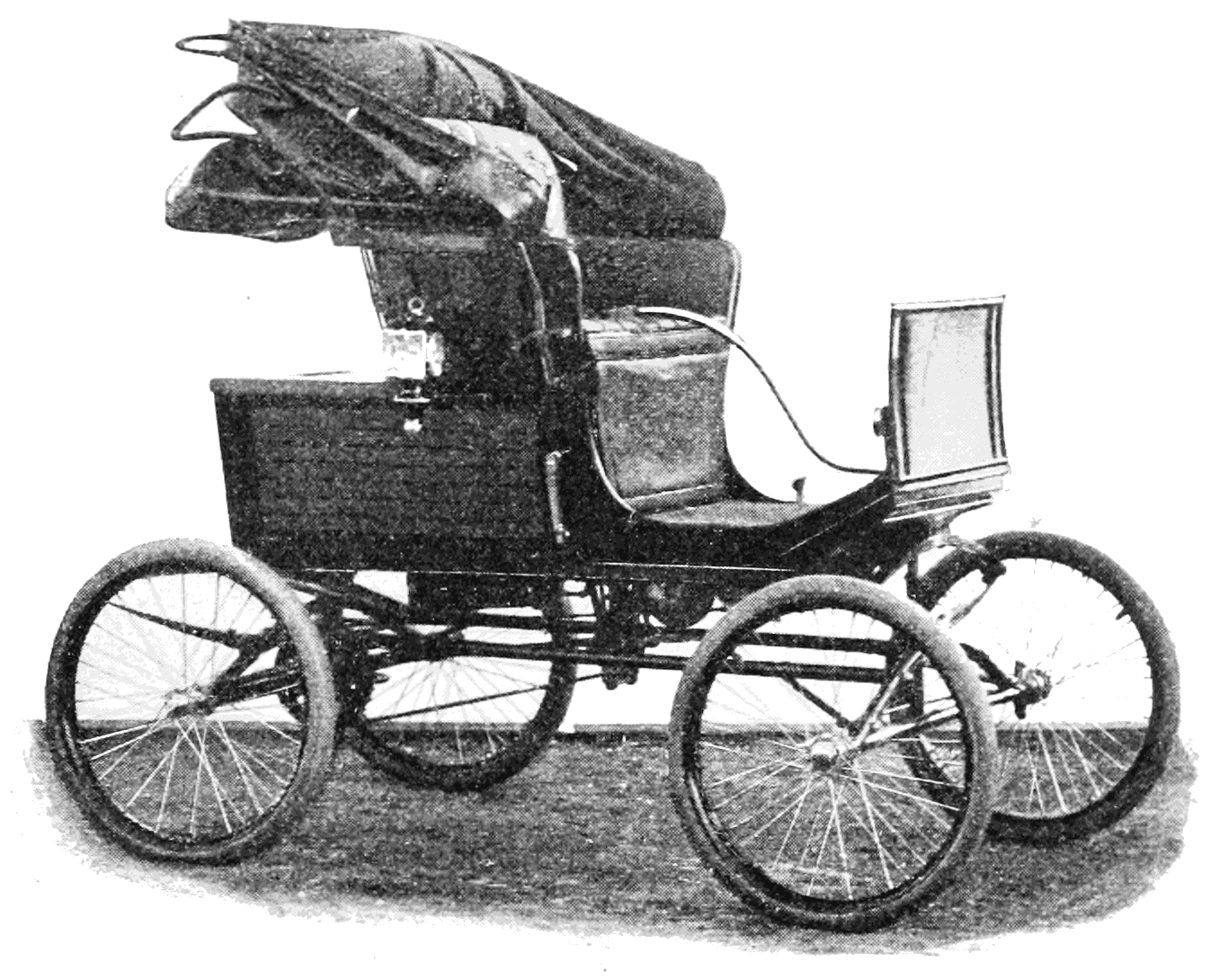
Locomobile model circa 1900

Barber also had an interest in automobile production, forming the Locomobile Company in 1898. The company at first produced small Stanley Steamer motor cars, which they initially sold for $600, with sales peaking at 1,600 cars in 1900. Locomobile later transitioned into selling internal-combustion automobiles.

== Personal life ==
In 1868, Barber married his first wife, Celia M. Bradley of Geneva, Ohio, who died shortly thereafter in 1870. In 1871, he married Julia Louise Langdon (1844–1912) of Belmont, New York. Julia was first cousins with Olivia Langdon Clemens (1845–1904), the wife of Samuel Langhorne Clemens (1835–1910), also known as Mark Twain. With Julia, he had five children, of which four reached adulthood: LeDroit, Lorena, Bertha, and Rowland.

Barber died of pneumonia in April 1909 at the age of 66 at his home "Ardsley Towers" in Ardsley-on-Hudson, New York. At the time of his death, The New York Times estimated his wealth at "many millions." Barber was buried at Oak Hill Cemetery in Washington, D.C.

=== Residences and hobbies ===
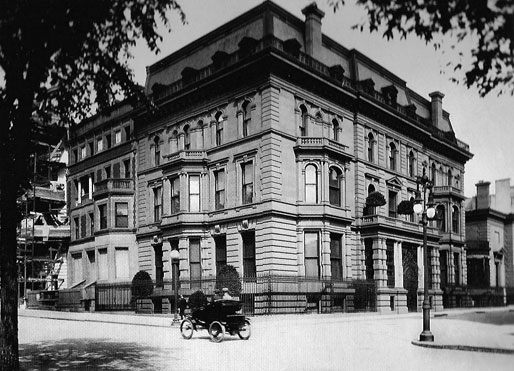
871 Fifth Avenue

As part of the purchase of the "Stone" property in 1880, Barber reserved the best piece of the property for his own use, and in 1886, commissioned architect Theophilus P. Chandler to design an imposing châteauesque Queen Anne mansion made of stone. It was located between 13th and 14th Streets and was one of Washington's most impressive mansions. Barber named it Belmont, after his second wife's hometown. In 1913, Belmont was sold by his son to developer Harry Wardman and razed in 1915 to allow for construction of the Clifton Terrace Apartments.

In 1889, he purchased the Cunard place on Staten Island, which he lived in during the summer with his family for four seasons. In 1891, he purchased the Robert L. Stuart mansion at 871 Fifth Avenue at Sixty-eight street in New York after the death of Stuart's widow, where his family spent part of each winter. The home on Fifth Avenue was later sold to William Collins Whitney around 1897.

In 1906, Barber an avid yachtsman, bought a 269-foot boat named the T.S.Y. Lorena, after his daughter. The yacht had a crew of 44 and comfortably held around 12 passengers. He was a trustee of Oberlin College from 1889 to 1909, and a director of Washington Loan and Trust.

== See also ==
- Freelan Oscar Stanley & Francis Edgar Stanley
- John Brisben Walker
- Stanley Motor Carriage Company
- Mobile Company of America
- Barber, New Jersey
