= Mobile Company of America =

Defunct American motor vehicle manufacturer (1899–1903)

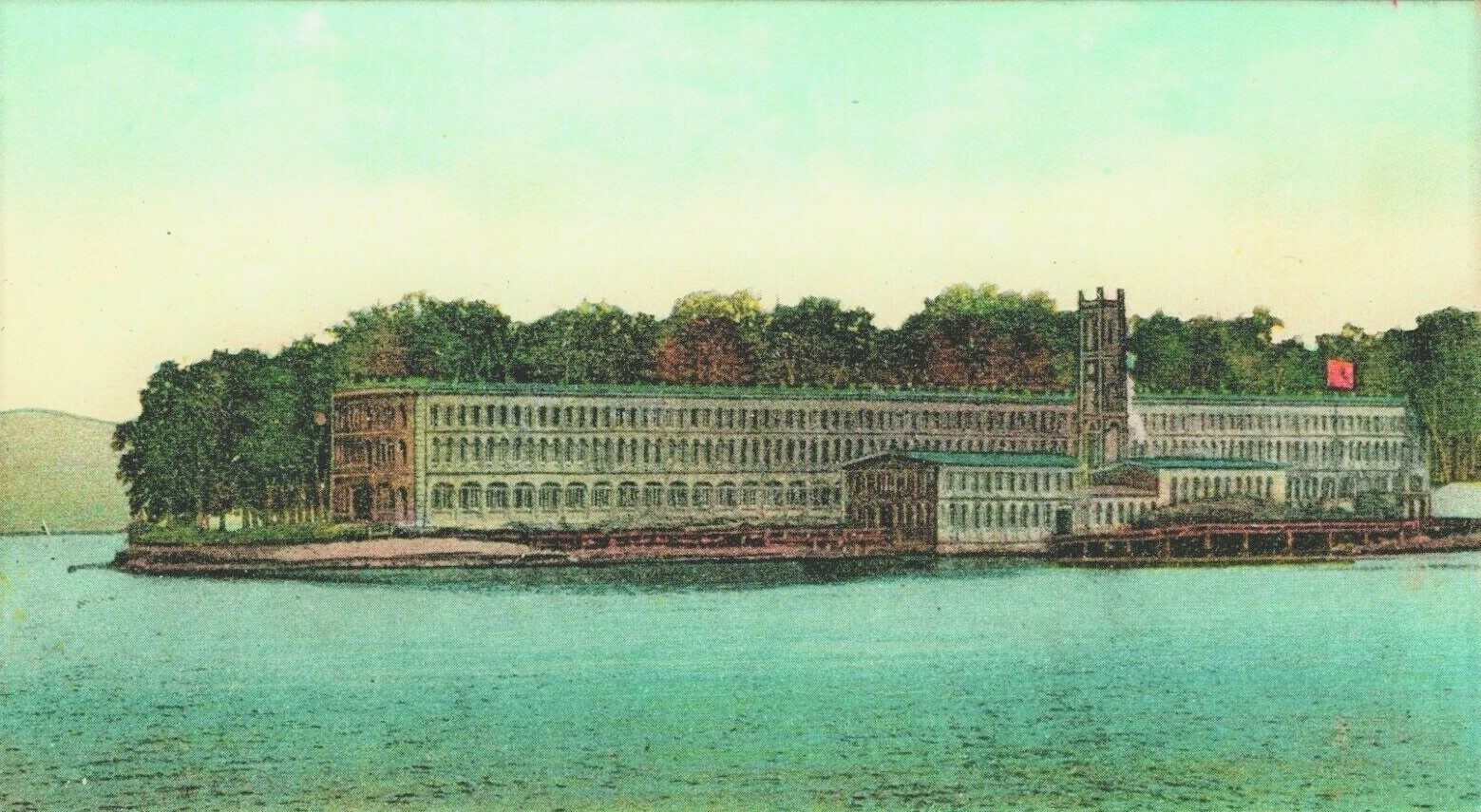
- Mobile Company of America Factory at Kingsland Point, North Tarrytown, New York
- Type: Automobile manufacturer
- Industry: Automotive
- Founded: 1899; 127 years ago
- Founder: John Brisben Walker
- Defunct: 1903; 123 years ago
- Fate: Closed
- Successor: Mobile Transit Company of America
- Headquarters: North Tarrytown, New York, United States
- Key people: John Brisben Walker
- Products: Automobiles
- Production output: c. 600 (1900–1903)

The Mobile Company of America was an American steam automobile manufacturer founded in 1899 by John Brisben Walker with production in North Tarrytown, New York.

== History ==
Mobile Victoria Runabout (1903)

Mobile Rapid Transit Wagonette (1903)

In 1895, eccentric and visionary entrepreneur John Brisben Walker had his Cosmopolitan magazine sponsor the second automobile race ever held in the United States. Walker had long been enamored with transportation innovations, reportedly offering his acquaintances, the Wright brothers, room on his estate in Irvington, New York, for their work. After one of the steam-powered cars made by the Stanley Brothers had set a new speed record of 27.4 miles per hour (44.1 km/h) in November 1898, he bought the Stanley Brothers company and patents for $250,000 in early summer 1899. In this, he partnered with Amzi L. Barber, a fellow Irvington resident who made his fortune producing and selling asphalt used to pave roads around the country. They set up the Automobile Company of America to produce steam carriages; but almost immediately Walker and Barber parted ways and split the company in two. Walker set up the Mobile Company of America with the right to the Stanley patents but no factory, while Barber's Locomobile Company of America shared the patent rights but also received the Stanley Watertown factory and most of the steam cars under production.

Walker purchased parts of the former Ambrose Kingsland estate in North Tarrytown (now Sleepy Hollow, New York) and hired McKim, Mead & White to design a purpose-built automobile factory at the foot of the village's Beekman Avenue. Manufacturing machinery was purchased and the new factory at Kingsland Point produced its first Mobile Steam carriage on March 7, 1900. Advertising claimed the establishment to be the largest automobile factory in the world.

Mobile's version of the steam carriage had a 5–12 horsepower (3.7–8.9 kW) engine, with a water tank range of about 35 miles (56 km) and a gasoline tank range of between 60 and 75 miles (97 and 121 km). In 1901 kerosene could replace gasoline for fuel. Originally built as a light runabout, Mobile added up to 24 styles of body to improve poor sales. By 1902, a top speed of 50 mph (80 km/h) was claimed. Prices for the Model 4 runabout started at $750 (equivalent to $27,909 in 2025) rising to a nine-passenger "coupe" Model 50 for $3,000 (equivalent to $111,635 in 2025).

The Automobile Races held at Newport, Rhode Island in September 1900 featured a steam vehicle race won by Joseph H. McDuffee driving the Mobile. Also in September 1900, Walker, accompanied by his eight-year-old son Justin, displayed the hill-climbing prowess of the Mobile (reportedly a two-seat, 2-cylinder Model 4 runabout)[ by driving one up Pikes Peak to a height of 11,000 feet (3,400 m) (but not to the top of the 14,115 ft (4,302 m)-high peak), presumably the highest altitude ever reached by an automobile until then. In August the following year, one of his cars, driven by others, did reach the top. These stunts, however, were ridiculed by the Colorado newspapers in articles claiming that "the west is not yet prepared for the flood of automobile travel that Mr. Walker promises to let loose in the mountains."

Advertising for the Mobile Company was taken out in most major magazines; Walker was the publisher of The Cosmopolitan and the Mobile Company of America featured prominently in it. Mobile's new factory was expected to produce 20 steam carriages weekly. By the fall of 1901, production was averaging 5 steam carriages a week. Barber's Locomobile Company built approximately 5,000 steam runabouts over three years. Mobile, being slower to market, built an estimated 600. In early 1903, the Mobile Company of America stopped production. Later in the same year, the equipped automobile plant was leased to Maxwell-Briscoe. In 1905, Walker sold The Cosmopolitan to William Randolph Hearst. Not long after the sale, what seems to be a press release appeared in identical form in several newspapers around the country under the caption "Why It Was Sold". In pertinent part, it read:

…a sudden change in public favor from steam to the French gasoline car left the company with branch houses from Boston to San Francisco and losses exceeding $1,700,000. Mr. Walker personally assumed the indebtedness of the Mobile Company of America, and not only paid it off in full, but returned to every shareholder the amount of his investment, with interest. This action required the sale of the Cosmopolitan Magazine, Kingsland Point, and some other properties.

With some short interruptions, the site of Walker's automobile plant would continue to be used to build cars until June 1996, when General Motors finally stopped production of cars there and closed its North Tarrytown Assembly plant.

== Gallery ==
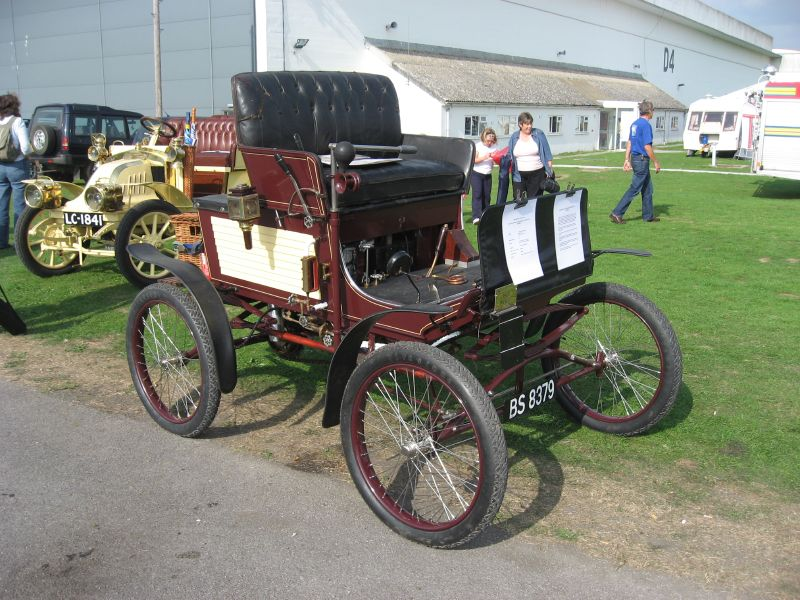
1900 Mobile steam runabout

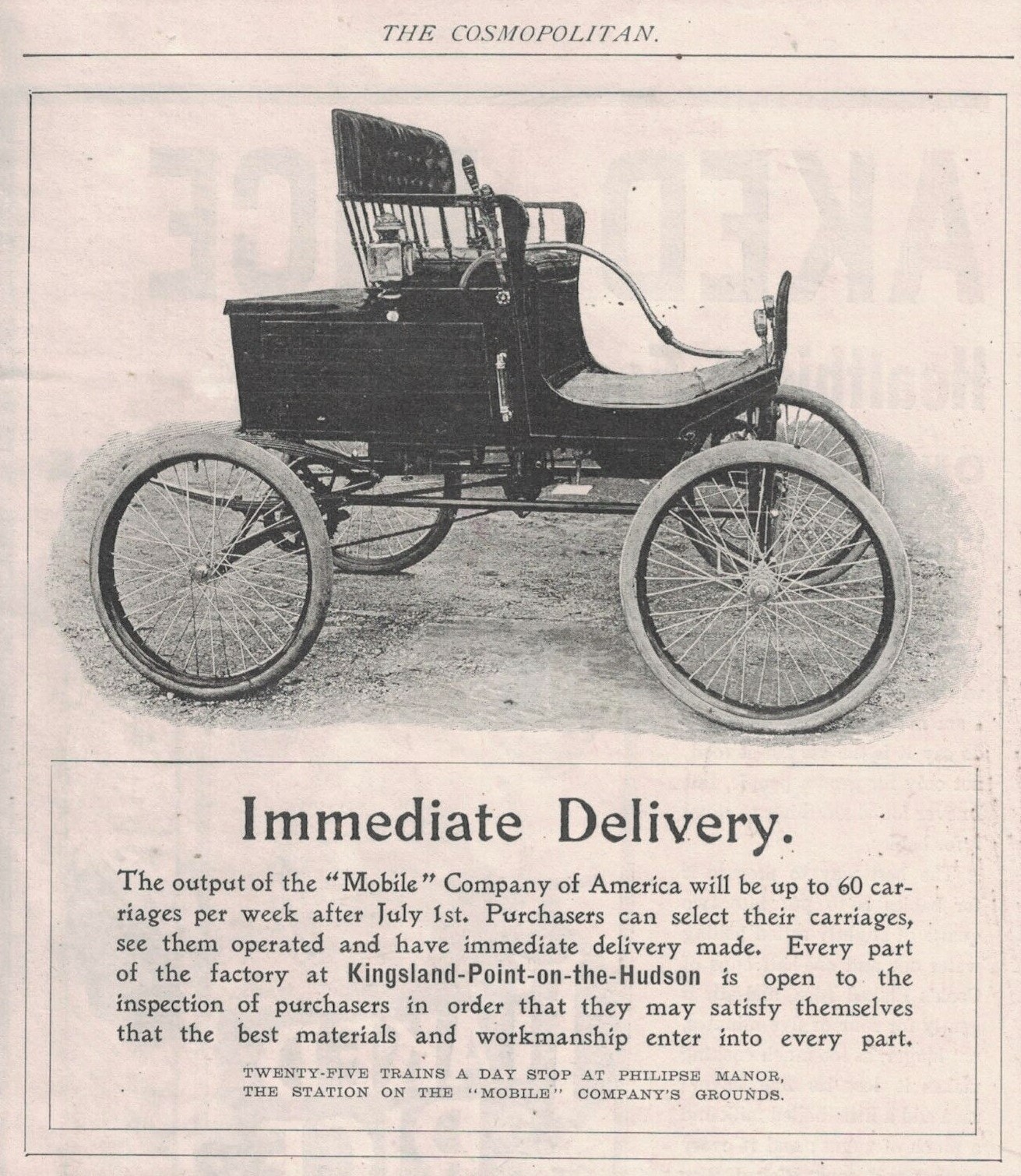
1900 Mobile steam runabout advertisement

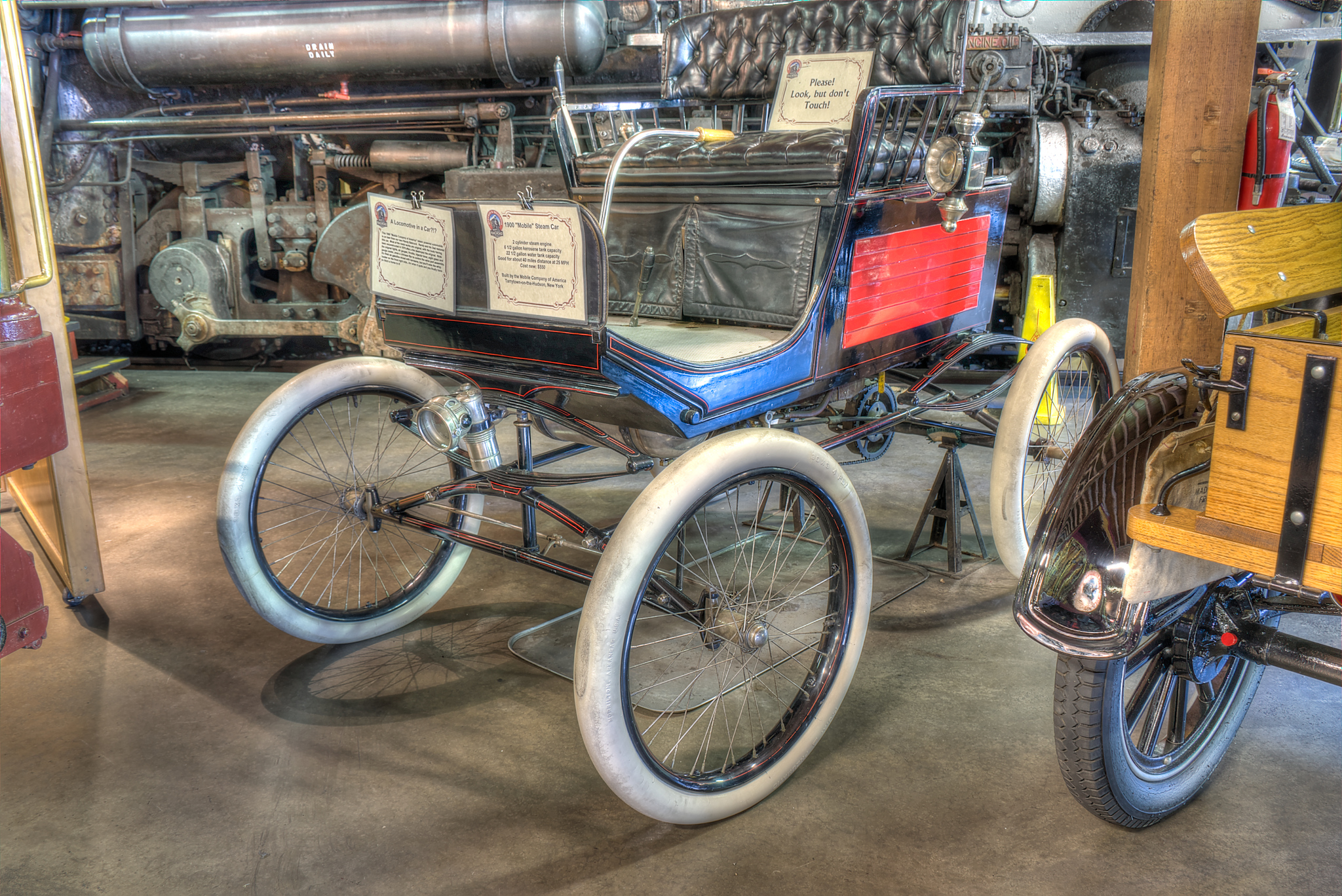
1900 Mobile steam runabout at the D&SNG Museum in Durango, Colorado

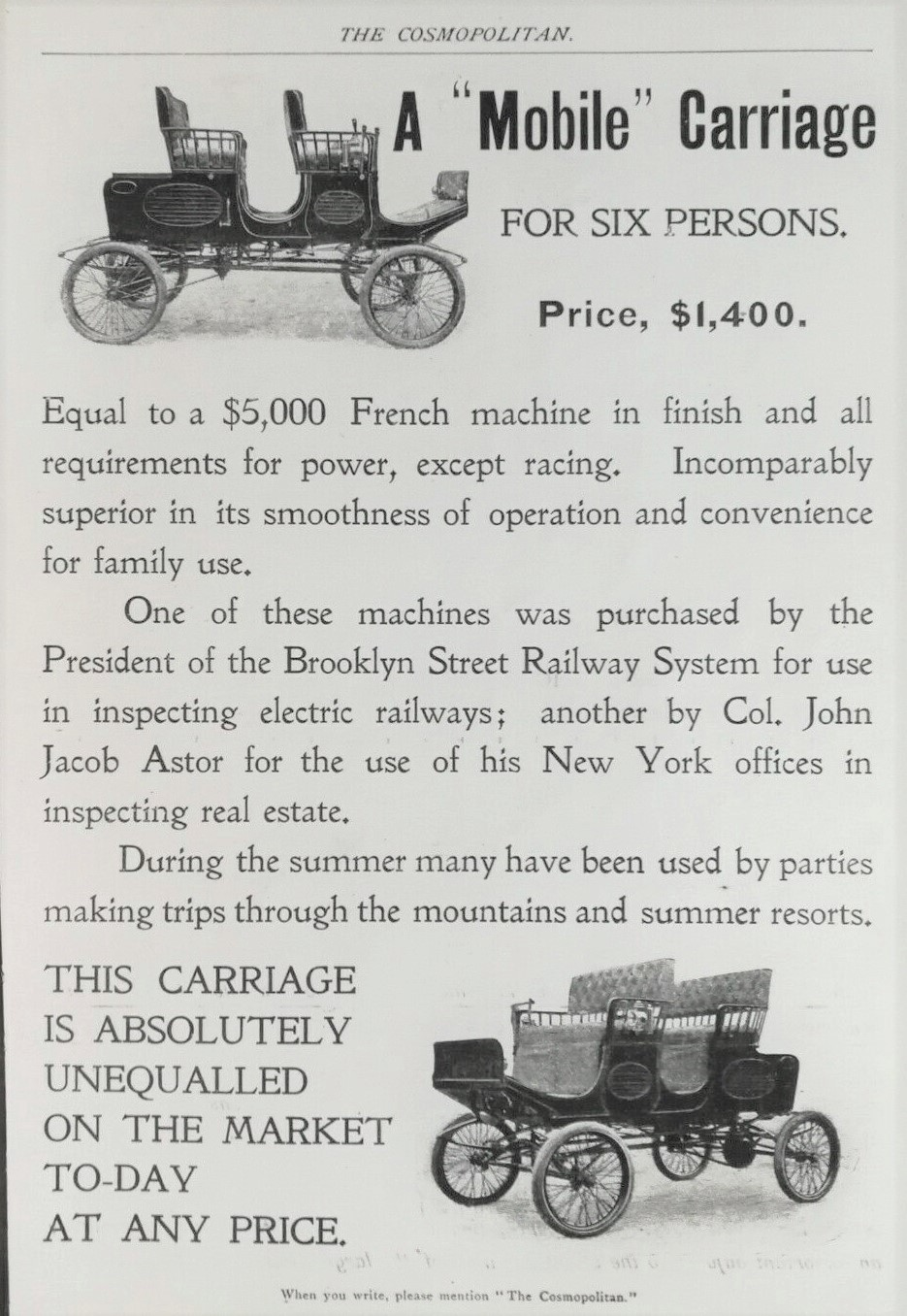
1901 Mobile Steam Carriage advertisement

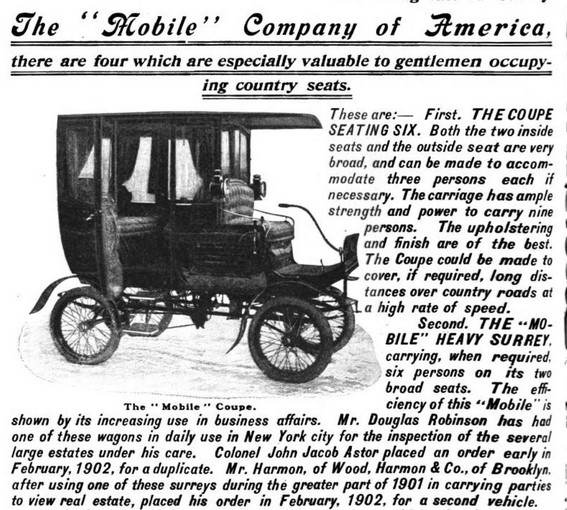
1902 Advertising for a Mobile coupe steam carriage

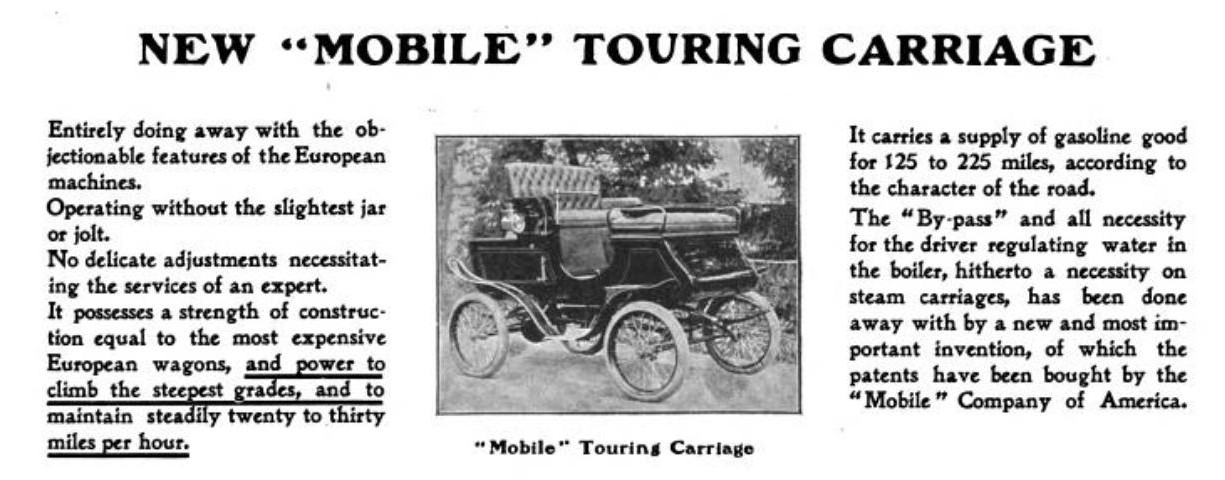
1902 advertising for Mobile Touring Carriage

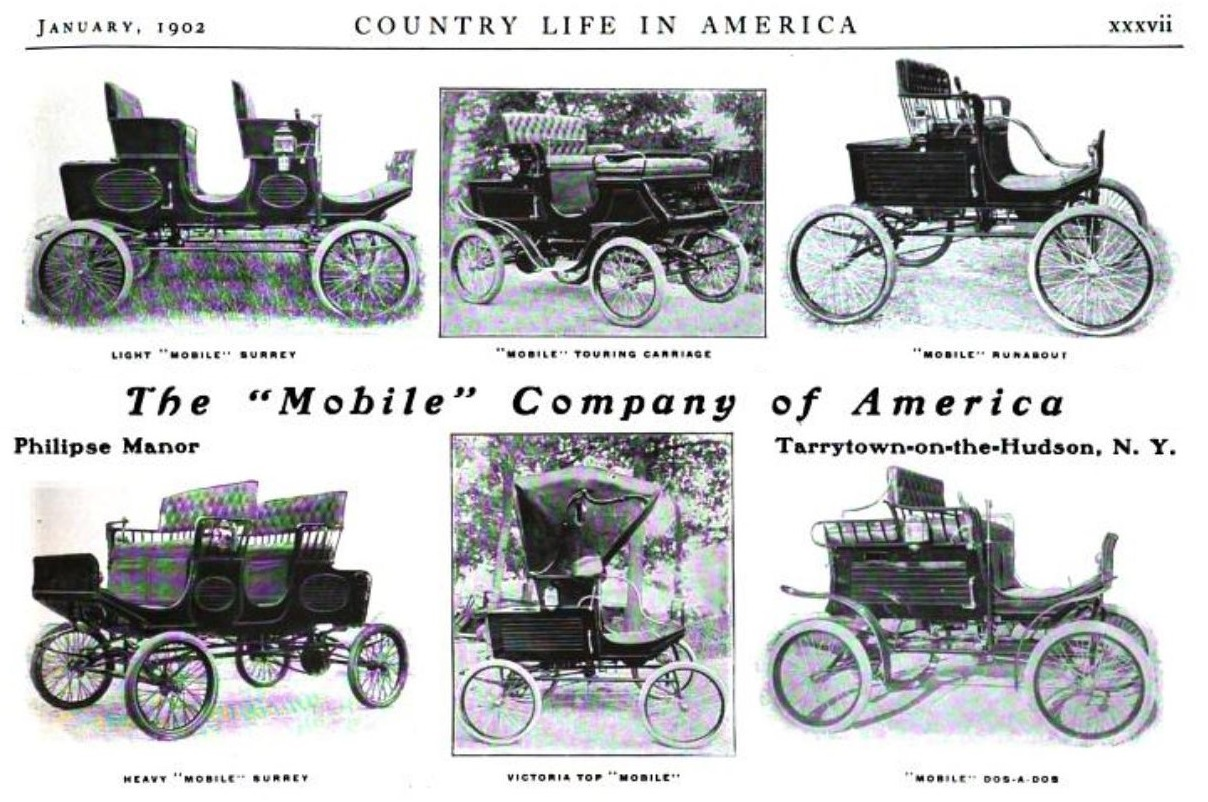
1902 advertising 24 styles of Mobile steam cars
