= John Brisben Walker =

American entrepreneur and magazine publisher

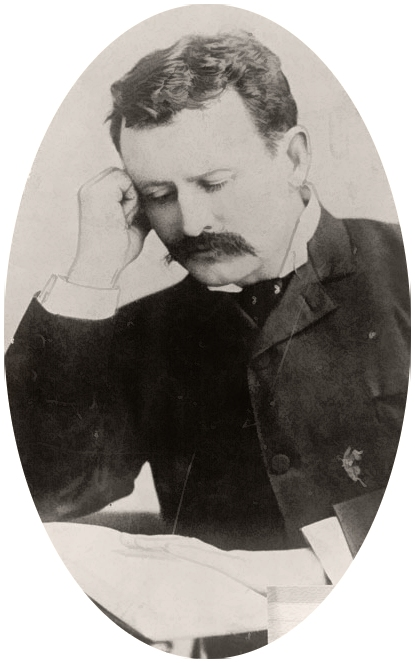
- Walker c. 1890
- Born: September 10, 1847 near Pittsburgh, Pennsylvania, US
- Died: July 7, 1931 (aged 83); Brooklyn, New York, US
- Occupation: Entrepreneur
- Spouses: Emily Strother (m. 1871; div. 1914) Ethel Richmond (m. 1914; died 1916) Iris Calderhead (m. 1918)
- Children: 12

John Brisben Walker (September 10, 1847 – July 7, 1931) was a magazine publisher, agricultural innovator, land developer, and automobile entrepreneur in the United States. He led an extraordinary life as a "Renaissance man" whose careers spanned the military, high-stakes journalism, pioneering transportation, and massive real estate development.

== Early years ==
Walker was born on September 10, 1847, at his parents' country house on the Monongahela River, near Pittsburgh, Pennsylvania. On that river his grandfather owned a shipyard reputed to be where the keelboat used by the Lewis and Clark expedition was built, although this is disputed.

After a brief stint as a Georgetown College student, Walker transferred to West Point in 1865. In 1866 he was court-martialed for deserting his post as a sentinel in cadet barracks before being relieved, suspended for ten weeks, and set back a semester. In 1868 he was again court-martialed, this time for stretching a seven-day New Year's leave to seventeen days.. After being convicted, he resigned from the Military Academy without graduating.

== China ==
Shortly thereafter, a family connection helped him find a place accompanying J. Ross Browne, the newly named Envoy of the United States, to China, which was then recovering from a devastating civil war, the Taiping Rebellion.

In China, Walker found a use for his military training. Through the influence of Anson Burlingame, a recently retired former U.S. minister to the Qing Empire, Walker entered the Chinese Army, where he served for two years advising local commanders on the reorganization of infantry units. The experience left a strong impression on Walker, prompting him to say years later that if China ever modernized its military system, "it will not be long before the Yellow Dragon will be the most formidable battle ensign on earth."

== West Virginia ==
In 1870, Walker arrived in Charleston, West Virginia, founded a weekly newspaper called the Charleston Herald, and hired David Hunter Strother to be its editor. Strother had experience as a writer and illustrator for Harper's Monthly under the name Porter Crayon. In 1871, Walker married Strother's daughter, Emily, "the prettiest girl in the valley of the Virginia," (with whom he would have eight children before their divorce 33 years later).

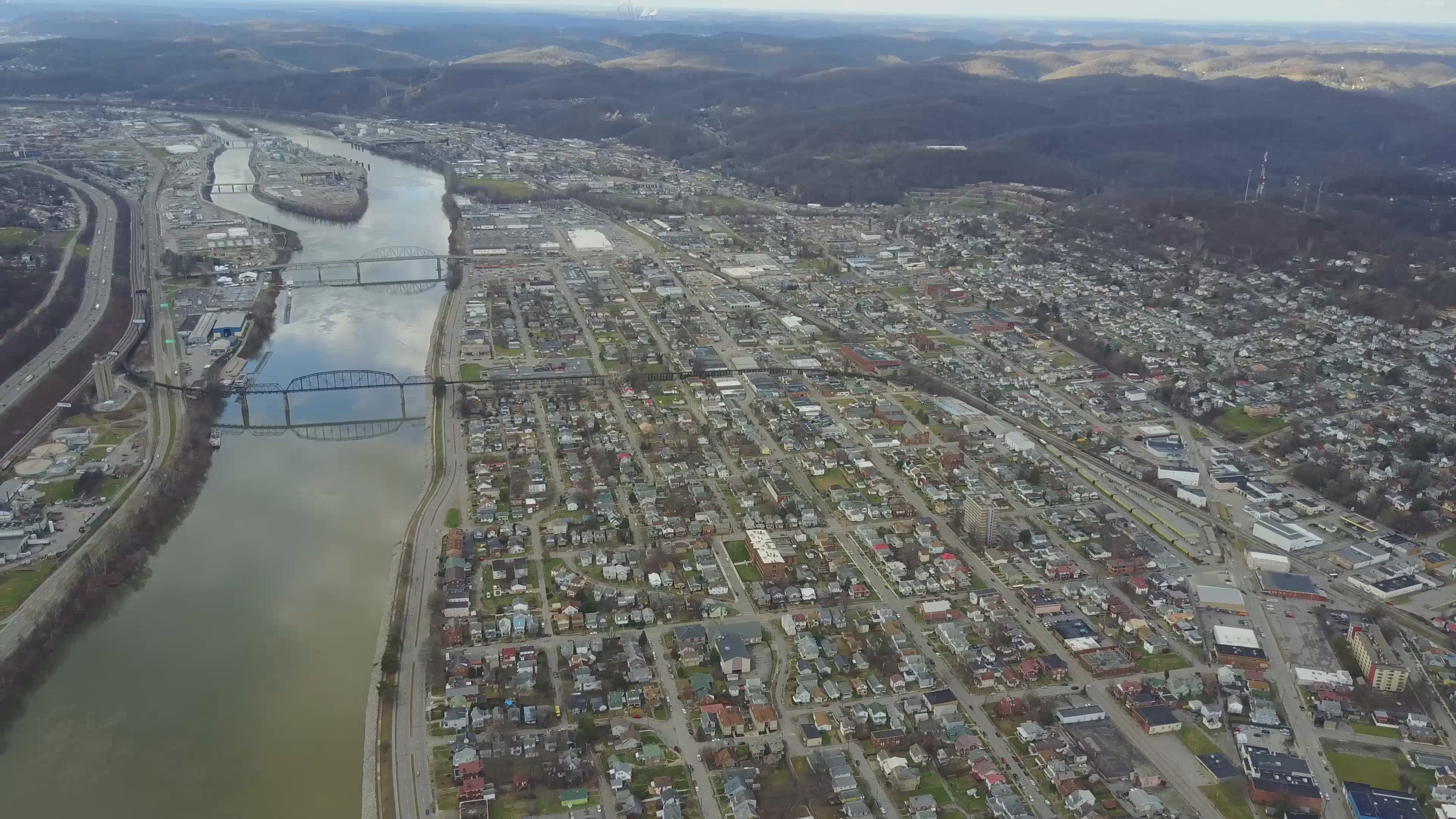
Charleston's West Side in 2017

When the West Virginia capital was first moved from Wheeling to Charleston, Walker seized on the opportunity. With local financial backing, he purchased land extending from the Elk River west to a line that ran from the Kanawha River near the end of the present Delaware Avenue to about the end of Fayette Street at West Washington Street, and extending from the Kanawha River to the present West Washington Street. This he designated as the "J.B. Walker addition to the City of Charleston" (it is now the core of the city's West Side neighborhood). Walker laid out this section into a town site, with streets running in one direction and avenues in another. He named the streets for West Virginia counties, and the avenues for other states.

Walker's original plans, with a few changes in names, but little other variation, are still the plans of that part of the city. He made his first fortune developing the property as a residential and industrial community, only to lose everything in the Panic of 1873 when various railroads went bankrupt, causing the failure of the banks that had financed them.

== Washington, D.C. ==
After his real estate venture collapsed, Walker was asked by the editor of the Cincinnati Commercial-Gazette to do a series of articles on the mineral and manufacturing industries of the West and their future prospects. Walker travelled throughout the West to do the necessary research and the articles were well received by the reading public. Walker was then offered and accepted the job of managing editor of the Pittsburgh Telegraph, which led to him being hired in 1876 as managing editor of the Washington Chronicle. He moved his growing family to Washington, D.C. and remained there until 1879, when he was appointed by the United States Department of Agriculture as a Commissioner tasked with determining agriculture possibilities in arid regions of the West.

== Colorado ==
Walker moved his family to Colorado and, based on what he had learned as Commissioner, decided to try his hand at farming. He purchased 1,600 acres in north Denver and used what he knew about irrigation to grow alfalfa as a cash crop. This turned out to be a lucrative business, and within ten years, his Berkeley Farm was the largest alfalfa grower in Colorado, harvesting nearly 3,000 tons annually and containing nearly 200 miles of main and lateral irrigation ditches. With his farming profits, he turned to real estate development.

In 1880, Walker bought 550 lots in Denver near the Platte River and over the ensuing years developed an amusement park on this property. In 1887 more than 20,000 people came to the opening of River Front Park. It featured a racetrack, medieval castle, baseball park, toboggan slide, an exhibition hall, and a grandstand with a capacity of 5,000 people in which Walker staged Denver's first rodeo. A showboat on the river put on performances every evening during the summer, but the Sunday shows were cancelled after the manager and company were arrested and fined for violating Sunday blue laws. Walker also bought waterlogged tracts in the Platte River valley that he devised a means of reclaiming. His investment is these tracts was said to be $100,000 and they were bought by railroads for a price reputed to be $1,000,000.

== Acquisition of The Cosmopolitan and move to New Jersey ==
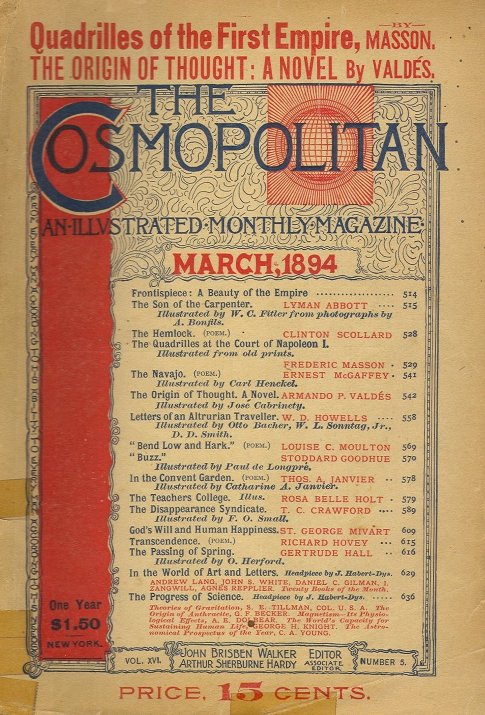
March 1894 cover of The Cosmopolitan

In 1888, Walker returned to his journalistic pursuits. He sold his Berkeley Farm to a group of investors, and in 1889 used part of the proceeds to buy for $360,000 The Cosmopolitan, an insolvent monthly magazine with a circulation of 16,000. He would transform it from a nondescript literary magazine into America's leading general-interest magazine, using it to promote a progressive, reform-minded agenda to an educated, middle-class audience.

To undertake direct management of the magazine he moved himself and his family back East, to Orange, New Jersey.

Shortly after buying the magazine, Walker, on a ferry on his way to his office, read in the New York World that its star reporter Nellie Bly was about to embark on a round-the-world trip in an attempt to complete it in less time that the 80 days in had taken the hero of Jules Verne's popular novel published 16 years earlier. Six hours after Walker arrived at his office, his 28-year-old literary editor, Elizabeth Bisland, was on a train to San Francisco to begin a race around the world in the opposite direction of Bly. The race between Bisland and Bly was covered by newspapers across the United States and was a boon to the country's gambling houses. Both completed their journey in under 80 days. Bly won by four days, finishing in 72, but the race achieved the object of giving a boost to circulation of The Cosmopolitan. It climbed to 100,000 by 1892 (and would reach 300,000 by 1897).

In 1893 Walker increased his wealth by selling River Front Park to the city of Denver, shortly before the Panic of 1893 that might have lost him his fortune for a second time.

== Move to New York state and the Mobile Company of America ==
In 1894, Walker and his family moved to Irvington, New York, a village on the shores of the Hudson River about 20 miles north of Manhattan that then had many of the wealthiest people in the country as residents. He promptly commissioned the construction of a new headquarters for his now thriving magazine, the Cosmopolitan Building. To this day, the three-story stone Neo-Classical revival building remains the largest building in Irvington.

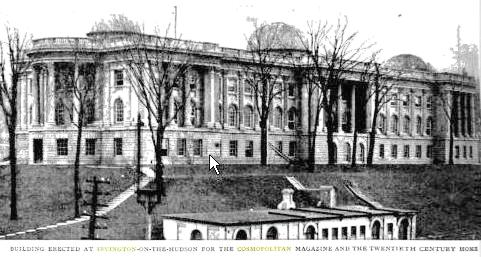
The Cosmopolitan Building in Irvington, c.1900

In 1895, he had The Cosmopolitan sponsor the second automobile race ever held in the United States. The magazine offered an aggregate of $3,000 in prizes to whoever first completed the 52-mile round trip from New York City Hall in Manhattan to the new Ardsley Country Club in Irvington, and back. On May 30, 1895, then called Decoration Day, six cars started up Broadway behind riders on horseback who cleared the road of pedestrians and onlookers for them. One rider was arrested mid-race for knocking a bicyclist off his bike. Only three cars made it out of Manhattan, and only two of them could make it up the hill by the Country Club under their own power; all had to be pushed by spectators. The two did manage to finish the race back at New York City Hall.

In 1897, Walker devised a plan for a free distance-education college called Cosmopolitan University, modeled after Chautauqua schools. The Cosmopolitan would cover all expenses, requiring only a commitment to a set number of study hours. When 20,000 students immediately signed up, Walker could not fund the school, so students were then asked to contribute $ 20 a year; however, the project still failed to survive in the long term.

Ever "an avid geek and prophetic thinker," Walker had long been enamored with transportation innovations, reportedly offering his acquaintances, the Wright brothers, room on his estate for their work. After one of the steam-powered cars made by the Stanley Brothers had set a new speed record of 27.4 miles per hour in November 1898, he bought the Stanley Brothers company and patents for $250,000 in early summer 1899. In this, he partnered with Amzi L. Barber, a fellow Irvington resident who made his fortune producing and selling asphalt used to pave roads around the country, including Pennsylvania Avenue in Washington, D.C. The partnership was very short-lived, dissolving on July 18, 1899.

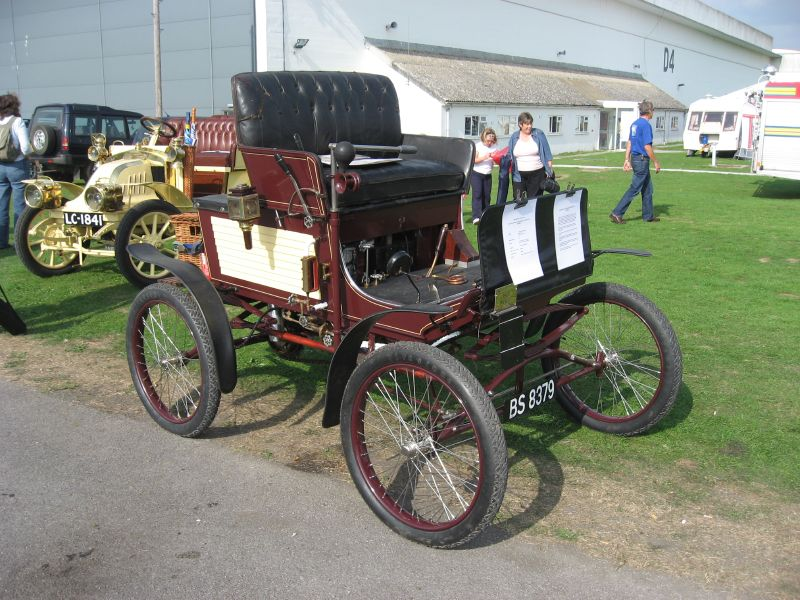
Mobile steam car, 1900

In the split-up, Barber got the factory in Watertown, Massachusetts, that the Stanley Brothers company had built, together with most of the steamers under production. He sold the cars as "Locomobiles." Walker wound up with the rights to produce steamers and pieces of undeveloped land (parts of the former Ambrose Kingsland estate) in North Tarrytown, New York. He founded the Mobile Company of America and hired McKim, Mead & White (who had designed his Cosmopolitan Building) to design a purpose-built automobile factory on the southern plot, at the foot of the village's Beekman Avenue. Walker's steamers were to be sold as "Mobiles." In March 1900, the first Mobile was ready for sale.

Walker, accompanied by his 8-year-old son Justin, displayed the hill-climbing prowess of the Mobile (reportedly a two-seat, 2-cylinder Model 4 runabout)[ on September 8, 1900, by driving one up Pikes Peak to a height of 11,000 feet (but not to the top of the 14,115-foot-high peak), presumably the highest altitude ever reached by an automobile until then. In August the following year, one of his cars, driven by others, did reach the top. These stunts, however, were ridiculed by the Colorado newspapers in articles claiming that "the west is not yet prepared for the flood of automobile travel that Mr. Walker promises to let loose in the mountains."

Near his North Tarrytown plant, Walker began subdividing the northern part of the former Kingsland estate, attempting to capitalize on the site's location along the Hudson River Railroad. One of his selling points for the residential development, called Philipse Manor in a confused reference to nearby Philipsburg Manor House, was the rail access, but this failed to materialize, and Walker's Philipse Manor Land Company floundered. The Mobile Company of America also failed: steam-powered carriages proved to be inferior to gasoline internal combustion vehicles. The heavily indebted Walker had to sell the Philipse Manor development to William Abraham Bell, who had invested in Walker's automobile venture. (Bell, with his extensive experience in railroad development, not only continued the residential construction at Philipse Manor but also made the rail service possible by building the station and presenting it to the railroad. Wealthy New Yorkers started eagerly buying homes in Philipse Manor. Today, the Philipse Manor neighborhood is part of the village of Sleepy Hollow, and the Philipse Manor station is on the National Register of Historic Places.)

Walker's Mobile Company of America had produced only 600 Mobiles, as contrasted to Barber's 5,000 steam Locomobiles. Later in 1903, the equipped automobile plant at Kingsland Point was leased (and subsequently sold) to Maxwell-Briscoe, a gasoline-powered automobile manufacturer. In 1905, Walker sold The Cosmopolitan to William Randolph Hearst for a sum variously reported as $400,000 and $1,000,000. Not long after the sale, what seems to be a press release appeared in identical form in several newspapers around the country under the caption "Why It Was Sold". In pertinent part, it read:

…a sudden change in public favor from steam to the French gasoline car left the company with branch houses from Boston to San Francisco and losses exceeding $1,700,000. Mr. Walker personally assumed the indebtedness of the Mobile Company of America, and not only paid it off in full, but returned to every shareholder the amount of his investment, with interest. This action required the sale of the Cosmopolitan Magazine, Kingsland Point, and some other properties.

(With some short interruptions, the site of Walker's automobile plant would continue to be used to build cars until June 1996, when General Motors finally stopped production of cars there and closed its North Tarrytown Assembly plant.)

Among Walker's other grandiose plans during his New York years was one for building a great public bathhouse modeled on Roman baths, a public laundry, and a tenement house with a cooperative kitchen in New York City.

During his tenure as owner of The Cosmopolitan, Walker wrote many articles, essays, and even fiction stories for the magazine, reflecting his diverse and varied personal interests, which ranged from contemporary economic and political issues to aviation and automobiles. In 1904, he published them as a book. Many of his articles promoted a progressive, reformist social agenda. He wrote several articles on the then-President Theodore Roosevelt; the two men corresponded and met several times.

== Return to Colorado ==
After selling The Cosmopolitan and his Westchester properties, Walker returned to Colorado in 1906. He was accompanied by a woman named Ethel Richmond, whom he identified as his wife, who came with four children, ages four to ten, all of whom later in life regularly identified Walker as their father and used his name as their family name. However, he was still married to Emily Strother. They were not divorced until July 1, 1914.

Some sources say Ethel Richmond was Walker's secretary, but she first may have been a nanny for Walker and Emily's family. This is suggested by the fact that in November 1890, when Walker and Emily were then living in the east, they and their 11-year-old son James Randolph Walker made a trip to Colorado Springs and Ethel, then about 23-years-old, accompanied them.

Town of Morrison

On his return to Colorado with Ethel, Walker concentrated his efforts on developing real estate he earlier had accumulated around Morrison, a town not far from Denver. For the most part, he had bought undeveloped land or platted lots for speculation, eventually owning about 4,000 acres around the town, including both Mount Falcon and nearby Mount Morrison, which overlooks the town of Morrison and features a natural geologic amphitheater that today is known as the Red Rocks Amphitheatre.

On the crest of Mount Falcon, Walker built a stone castle designed by Jacques Benedict for himself, Ethel, and family. On Mount Morrison, assisted by his eldest son, John Jr., he began developing Red Rocks with the dream of making it a world-famous music venue. Road and walking paths were built and a platform constructed high up in the Rocks. On May 31, 1906, a concert by Pietro Satriano and a 25-piece brass band in the amphitheater marked the grand opening of what Walker named The Garden of the Titans.

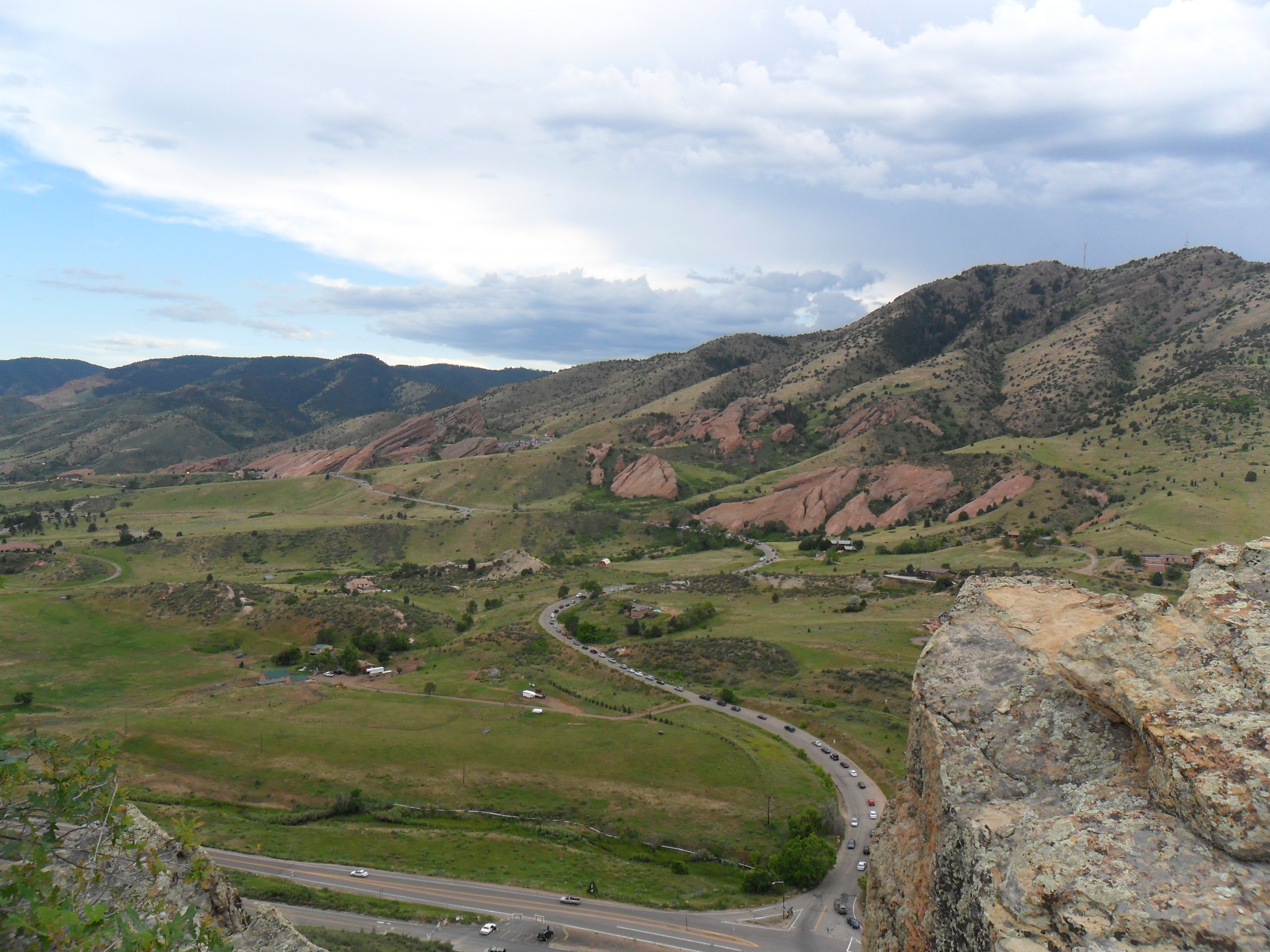
View of Red Rocks area and Mount Morrison

In 1909, after two years of construction, a one-mile funicular railroad to the top of Red Rocks, funded by Walker and a group of Morrison businessmen, opened as the Mount Morrison Incline Railroad, giving visitors a spectacular view of the Rocky Mountains and surrounding area. In that same year, John Jr. became Morrison's third mayor. Concerts in Red Rocks were a regular occurrence from 1906 to 1911. After her concert there in 1911, acclaimed opera singer Mary Garden declared that no opera house in the world had better acoustics than Red Rocks. However, although he had some early success in his desire to make Red Rocks a renowned venue, this did not become a reality until long after Walker had lost ownership of the site.

In 1909, he bought the "Swiss Cabin" in Morrison and converted it into a casino. It had earlier been the Evergreen Hotel and from 1884 to 1888 the home of Sacred Heart College, a Jesuit institution. Walker gave the Jesuits property in Denver as a new site for the college, which today is Regis University.

He championed the idea of creating on a ridge east of that castle a Summer White House for Presidents of the United States, and in 1911 a foundation was built and cornerstone laid, but because of American involvement in World War I and a decline in Walker's fortunes the project never progressed past that point.

In 1912, an idea that Walker espoused took a step toward fruition when the Denver City Council agreed to create a system of mountain parks near Morrison. In 1913, Denver Mayor Robert Speer managed to have a tax levy of one mill imposed to fund creation of the mountain parks system.

On January 1, 1913, yet another crusade of Walker's came to a successful end when Congress ordered the United States Postal Service to allow parcels weighing more than four pounds to be mailed at reasonable rates. Until then, mailing even a small package cost an exorbitant amount and forwarding of larger packages was the fiefdom of four private express companies. For years, Walker's pen had been a loud voice urging Congress to end their monopoly. An ironic twist was that Wells Fargo was one of the favored express companies, and members of the family from whom Walker bought his Irvington property had headed that company for years.

Walker had envisioned Morrison as becoming a booming tourism venue, but the advent of World War I dimmed that prospect. Walker was an early peace activist, organizing a World Congress of 100 outstanding men in 1912 to try to mold public opinion against war. After WW I began, he became an outspoken advocate for peace and opponent of the United States entering the War or providing assistance to combatants, serving as chairman of the Friends of Peace, an organization supported by many German-American societies.

== Financial ruin ==
In 1916, Ethel died and was buried by Walker at the foot of Mount Falcon. In April 1918, a lightning strike started a fire that destroyed the mansion Walker had built atop Mount Falcon. Six months later, in October 1918, in a home he owned in Denver, Walker, then 71, married 25-year-old Iris Calderhead, a firebrand women's suffragist who was sent from Washington by Alice Paul to organize the Colorado campaign for the National Woman Suffrage Association.

Walker's various Colorado real estate ventures were adversely affected by WWI, and did not recover after it ended. The enactment of the first Federal Income Tax in 1913 might also have hurt his fortunes. Between 1918 and 1925, a series of sales, mortgage foreclosures and tax sales of Walker's real estate holdings took place, to the extent that by 1925 more than 1,500 acres of Red Rocks Park and the Mount Morrison area had been acquired by a third party, who also took over the Casino and 180 acres surrounding it. Two years later, another 700 acres central to Red Rocks was sold to an affiliate of the earlier acquirer. This parcel was condemned by the city of Denver in 1928 and acquired by it for the sum of $54,133.

The sorry state of Walker's finances was highlighted in 1926 when his attempt to inaugurate bus service between Denver and Mount Falcon was rebuffed by the State Public Service Commission on the grounds that he was "unable to prove he possessed financial ability to insure service" on the line. From 1924 to 1927 Walker spent time in Texas trying to promote building durable dirt roads by use of a machine he had invented for removing water from clay so it would not freeze in winter, a method he said was much less expensive than other methods.

== Death ==
After a long illness, he died on July 7, 1931, in a house in Brooklyn, New York, with Iris by his side. His funeral arrangements were kept private. The July 8, 1931, obituary in The Rocky Mountain News said, in part:

Death yesterday closed the long and brilliant career of John Brisben Walker, whose multiple activities as a soldier, journalist, magazine editor and capitalist made him famous in Denver and throughout the world[...] Mr. Walker spent vast sums in the development of projects in and near Denver and has left vast monuments in Denver’s present system of mountain parks[...] He was the originator of the modern method of alfalfa farming in Colorado[...] He transformed the old [Cosmopolitan] magazine into a progressive publication and set new standards for fiction and illustrations. He was a close friend of Count Tolstoy, Camille Flammarion and Edgar Saltus[...] Mr. Walker mapped a system of roadways for Denver mountain parks. At a time when tourist advertising was little known, he advocated spending $1,000,000 to advertise Colorado.

== Personal life ==
The Rocky Mountain News described Walker as follows: "Of virile Scotch-Irish stock, he was handsome, moody, restless, known for his sparkling wit and brilliant, original mind."

Walker's first wife and mother of eight of his children, Emily, survived him by four years, dying in January 1935. His relationship with his purported second wife, Ethel Richmond, remains a question. The 1900 Federal Census lists Ethel living in Inwood, a section of northern Manhattan, with two children, her mother and father, three servants, and a husband named John Ruthven, whom according to that Census she had married in 1891. The 1902 New York City Directory lists Ethel Ruthven as "widow of John A., home Inwood" but three years later in 1905, the New York State Census taken on June 1 has Ethel living in Inwood with Ruthven four children. The following year Ethel arrives in Colorado as Walker's "wife".

In 1910, while Walker was still legally married to Emily, Ethel and her four children, now all designated as "Walkers", were living in a house on Shore Road in Brooklyn, with Walker's father. Five years later, a New York State Census lists Walker, Ethel, and four children living in Stapleton, Staten Island. There is no question that Ethel Ruthven and Ethel Richmond, Walker's "second wife", are the same person. Ethel Ruthven's parents are identified in the 1910 Federal Census (Inwood-on-Hudson, N.Y. City Ward 12, N.Y.) as Charles E. and Marion Lee. The death notice of John Ruthven Walker, who died in Denver in 1943, named Ethel's three other children (Herbert Lee Walker, Ethel Walker, Nathalie W. Richmond) as his siblings, her mother as his grandmother, and her sister, Maude R. F. Valle, as his aunt. (Nathalie called herself Mrs. Richmond even though she had married a Russian immigrant named Georgi Dobrovolsky. Sibling Ethel's middle name was Richmond.) In an interview given to a California newspaper after she celebrated her 100th birthday, Maude confirmed that after divorcing her husband she had moved to Denver "to be with her sister, who was married to the remarkable John Brisben Walker," who "had owned Cosmopolitan Magazine."

John Brisben Walker had 12 children from his first two marriages, 9 of whom were sons. He had no children with his third wife.

Children by Emily Strother: Wilfred Walker (died young), John Brisben Walker Jr. (1870–1941), David S. Walker (1874–?), James Randolph Walker (1879–1942), Justin Clement Walker (1881–?), Harold Strother Walker (1883–1919), Ethel Strother Walker Sweetser (1887–1957), Gerald Walker (1890–1945).

Children by Ethel Richmond: John Ruthven Walker (1896–1943), Herbert Lee Walker (1898–1964), Ethel Richmond Walker (c.1900-?), Nathalia (Nathalie) Richmond Walker (1903–1998).

== Legacy ==
- Cosmopolitan (magazine)
- Cosmopolitan Building in Irvington, New York
- Philipse Manor neighborhood in Sleepy Hollow, New York
- West Side neighborhood in Charleston, West Virginia

== Images of Walker Castle on Mt. Falcon ==
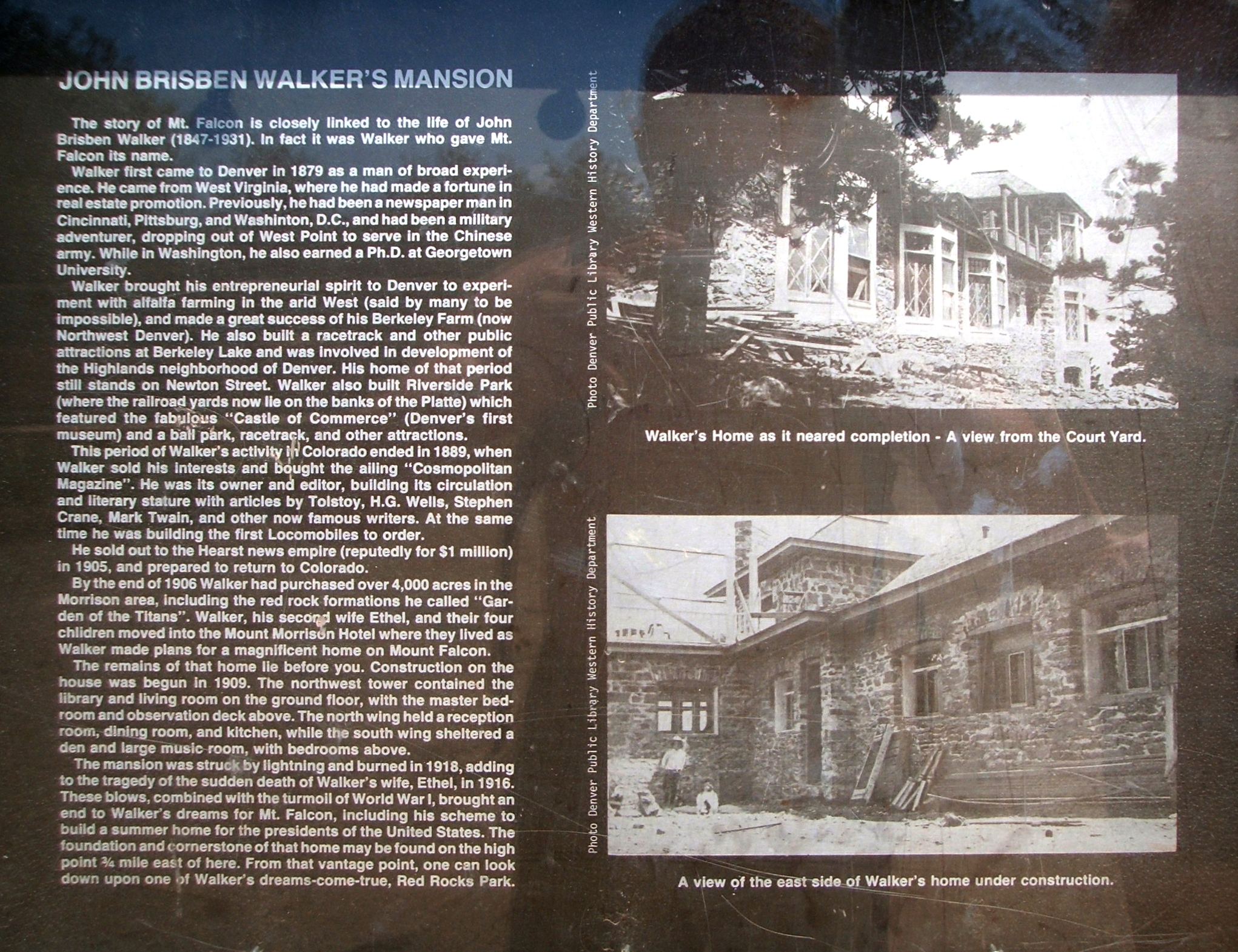
Interpretive sign with a description of Walker Castle and pictures of the house nearing completion

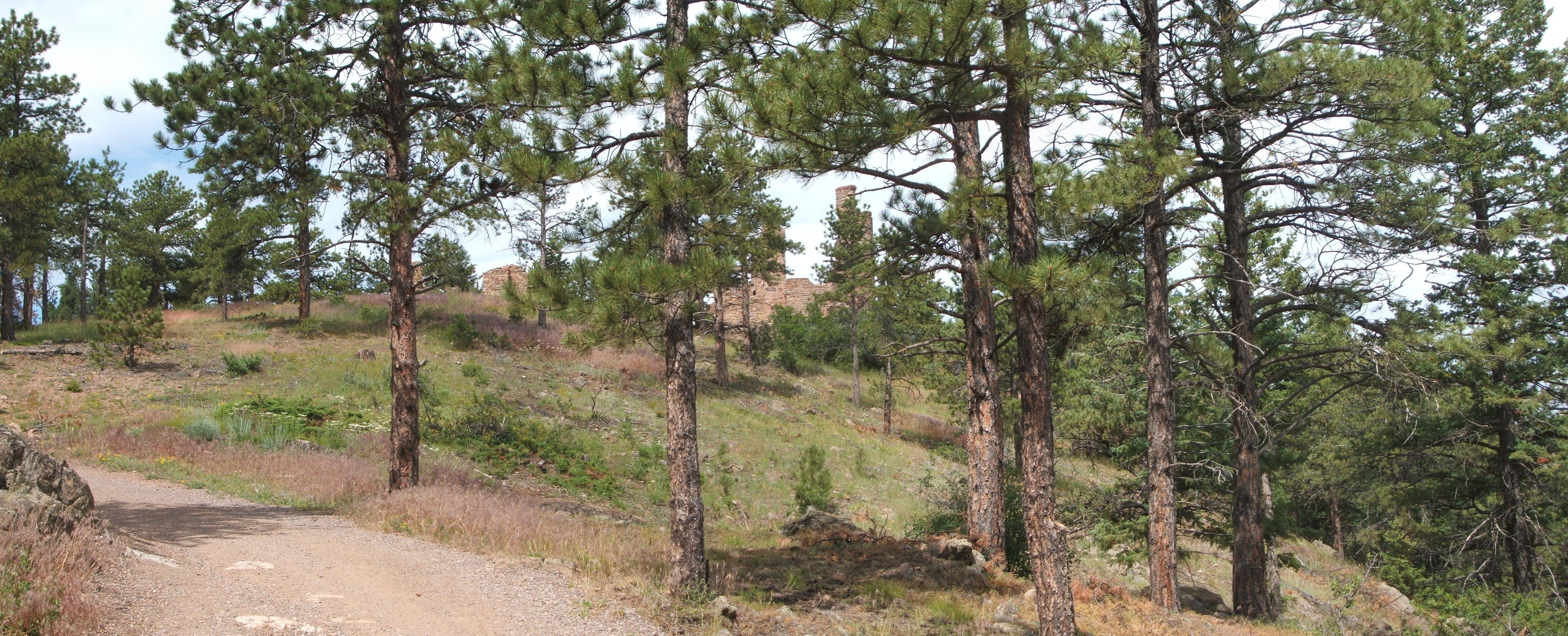
View of the ruins of Walker Castle on Mt. Falcon from Castle Trail

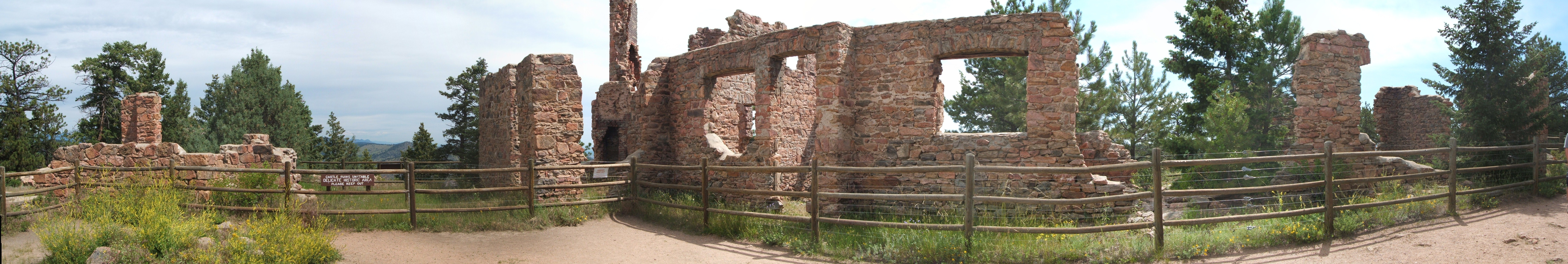
Central view of the ruins

== See also ==
- Cosmopolitan (magazine)
- Mobile Company of America
- Morrison, Colorado
