= Robert L. Stuart =

American sugar business owner

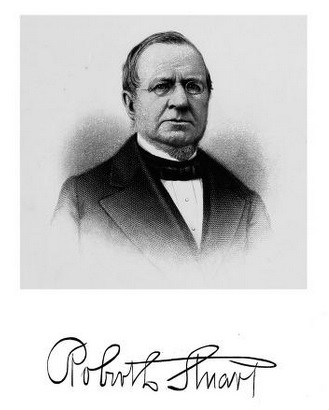
- Portrait of Robert Leighton Stuart (1806–1882)
- Born: 1806
- Died: 1882 (aged 75–76); New York City, United States
- Occupation: Businessman
- Known for: Co-owned the New York sugar refining business R. L. & A. Stuart
- Spouse: Mary McCrea (m. 1835)

Robert Leighton Stuart (1806–1882) was an American businessman who with his brother Alexander (1810–1879), owned the New York sugar refining business of R. L. & A. Stuart. They were philanthropists who donated most of their money to charitable causes. Robert was one of the founders of the American Museum of Natural History and president from 1872 until 1881.

== Early life ==
Robert L. Stuart's parents were Agnes Stuart (1785–1857) and Kinlock Stuart (1775–1826) from Edinburgh, Scotland. They emigrated to New York in 1806 after becoming debt-burdened whilst acting as guarantors to a relative. Within a few years they had made enough money from a candy business to repay these debts.

== Career ==
After the death of his father in 1826, Robert and his brother, Alexander, took over the business and in 1832, they started refining sugar. They were able to reduce production costs by using an innovative steam process. Their factory was at the junctions of Chambers, Greenwich, and Reade streets with a warehouse on the south side of Chambers Street reached by tunnel. Alexander, who was the engineer, lived in the house next door at 167 Chambers Street and this enabled him to monitor the processing night or day.

Robert Stuart handled the financial side of the business. The factories at their peak were producing 44,000,000 pounds of sugar per year, and due to the new production process they were able to undercut their competitors. In 1855, they stopped making candy and concentrated on their core business of sugar refining. Being strict Presbyterians, the brothers did not permit Sunday working and new employees were provided with a bible when they started at the company. Labor relations at the factories remained good and free from industrial unrest. During the New York City draft riots of 1863 the workers defended the factories, setting up barricades and arming themselves with clubs. A confrontation was avoided when the advancing mob turned away. The brothers ceased production in 1872 and retired.

== Personal life ==
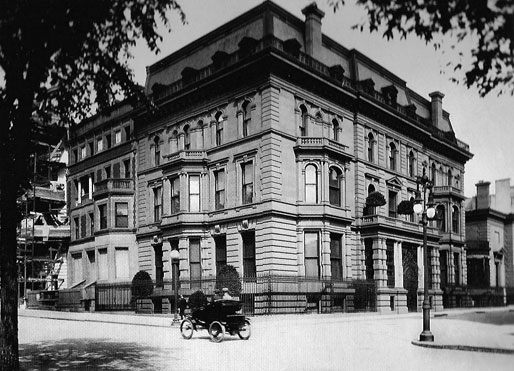
871 Fifth Avenue

In 1835, Robert Stuart married Mary McCrea (1810–1891), daughter of merchant Robert McCrea (1764–1837).

In about 1862, they moved from their 169 Chambers Street house to 154 Fifth Avenue, corner of Twentieth Street. They asked Alexander to join them but he preferred to remain in his old house. Robert started the building of a new house at 871 Fifth Avenue but died before it was completed. His widow Mary completed the construction of the house and died there in 1891. The house was later owned by Amzi L. Barber who sold it to William C. Whitney in 1897.

=== Philanthropy ===
Robert and Mary were childless, as was Alexander, and with no heirs they had an understanding that their estates would be left to each other. Robert had amassed a great collection of books, fine art and objet d'art during his lifetime. These were on display in his house and included 11,888 books, 1,963 pamphlets, 240 paintings and cabinets for natural history – rock, minerals and archaeological fragments. After his death, Mary made her will leaving the collection and a bequest of $50,000 to the American Museum of Natural History. However, a codicil was added in November 1887 changing the beneficiary to the Lenox Library. This was partly due to Mary's concern that the museum had plans to open to the public on Sundays.

Mary, Robert and Alexander were generous with their wealth, giving to causes such as the Presbyterian Hospital, Princeton Theological Seminary, Princeton College and the San Francisco Theological Seminary. They made large contributions towards the Civil War effort and supported soldiers who were injured and disabled. Mary left about $5 million in her will. The beneficiaries included distant relatives, pastors, a large number of hospitals plus The American Bible Society, the Board of Foreign Missions, the Board of Home Missions, the Presbyterian Hospital, the Lenox Library, the Theological Seminary at Princeton, the General Assembly of the Presbyterian Church, the American Sunday School Union, the Trustees of the Presbytery of New York, the New York Bible Society, the American Tract Society, the New York City Mission and Tract Society and YMCA of New York.
