= William C. Whitney House =

Demolished mansion in Manhattan, New York

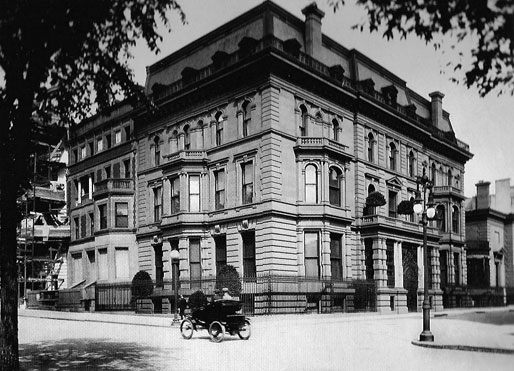
- Interactive map of the William C. Whitney House area

General information
- Coordinates: 40°46′11.7″N 73°58′6.5″W
- Completed: 1883
- Demolished: 1942

The William C. Whitney House was a mansion located on 871 Fifth Avenue and 68th Street on the Upper East Side of Manhattan, New York City.

It was originally constructed for Robert L. Stuart, who died before it was completed. It was next sold to Amzi L. Barber before it came into the ownership of William C. Whitney in about 1897. The house was later inherited by Whitney's eldest son Harry Payne Whitney, who lived there until his death in 1930. Under the terms of his will, his widow Gertrude Vanderbilt Whitney received a life interest in the property; after Gertrude's death, the house was to be demolished and sold, with the proceeds to be treated as part of Harry P. Whitney's residuary estate.

The house was demolished in 1942.
