= Live at Red Rocks =

Live at Red Rocks may refer to:

- Live at Red Rocks (video), a 1986 DVD by Stevie Nicks
- Live at Red Rocks (John Tesh album) (1995), live album and video
- Live at Red Rocks 8.15.95 (1997), live album by Dave Matthews Band
- Live at Red Rocks, a DVD by Rickie Lee Jones filmed in 1990 and released in 2001
- Live at Red Rocks (The John Butler Trio album) (2010)
- U2 Live at Red Rocks: Under a Blood Red Sky (1983), live video by U2
- Alive at Red Rocks (2004), live video by Incubus
- Live at Red Rocks (2016), live album by Rebelution
- Live at Red Rocks (2016), live album by alt-J
- Live at Red Rocks (2018), see Bad Company discography
- Live at Red Rocks Amphitheatre, 2018 live album by Australian musician Vance Joy
- Live at Red Rocks '22 (2022), live album by King Gizzard & the Lizard Wizard

== See also ==
- Category:Albums recorded at Red Rocks Amphitheatre
