= Luna Park, Charleston =

Former amusement park on the West Side of Charleston, West Virginia

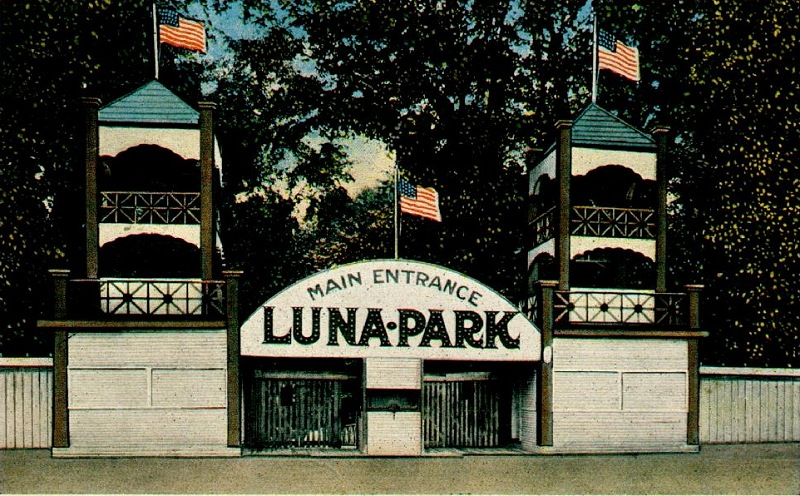
Post card picture of the main entrance of Luna Park, Charleston. After a fire destroyed its roller coaster, the park closed its gates in 1923.

Luna Park was an amusement park on the West Side of Charleston, West Virginia, United States, that was open to the public from 1912 until 1923. Located on the western side of Charleston on the north bank of the Kanawha River, the park was a popular destination that featured a roller coaster, a dance pavilion, a public swimming pool, a roller rink, and live entertainment. Admission to the park cost 15 cents per person; a ride on the Royal Giant Dips roller coaster cost one dime per trip. It was a trolley park served by the Charleston Interurban Railroad Company.

The primary attraction at Luna Park was the 45-foot-by-100-foot community swimming pool, which held an estimated 200,000 gallons of water. Unlike most pools of that size, the Luna Park pool was not made of concrete but of “lumber and tin sheet,” according to a report by the state Department of Health. A local newspaper reported in 1913 that 15,000 visited the park in the afternoon, followed by an evening crowd of about 16,000; street cars were carrying passengers to and from the park at a rate of about 1200 an hour. Others arrived by steamboat.

In May 1923, the Royal Giant Dips caught fire and was destroyed along with most of the park. Despite attempts by ownership to raise the money to rebuild Luna Park, it was never resurrected. Eventually, single-family housing was constructed on the park grounds.
