= Menconi =

Menconi is an Italian surname. It is the patronymic or plural form of an alteration of a shortened form of the name Domenico. Notable people with the surname include:

- Anna Menconi (born 1971), Italian Paralympic archer
- Arn Menconi (born 1959), American politician
- Gino Menconi (1899–1944), Italian partisan
- Lorrie Menconi (born 1948), American model
- Raffaele Menconi (1877–1942), Italian sculptor
- Ralph J. Menconi (1915–1972), American medal sculptor

== See also ==
- Meniconi
- Mengoni
