= Jan Owen =

Jan Owen may refer to:

- Jan Owen (poet) (born 1940), Australian poet
- Jan Owen (artist) (born 1947), American artist
- Jan Owen (entrepreneur) (born 1959), Australian entrepreneur
