= Frederick G. Zinsser =

Frederick G. Zinsser (March 21, 1868 – January 20, 1956) was a resident of Hastings-on-Hudson, New York who established a chemical plant on the waterfront of the Hudson River called Zinsser & Company, which synthesized organic chemicals. The Zinsser plant was as one of the establishments contracted to produce mustard gas during the First World War.

== Early life and education ==
Zinsser was born in New York City to German immigrants parents. Zinsser completed a degree in chemistry at Columbia University, and then further studied at Louvain University in Belgium, and Göttingen University and Heidelberg University in Germany, where he received a Ph.D. in 1891. At Heidelberg University he worked three years under Viktor Meyer, who first synthesized mustard gas in 1886.

== Career ==
In 1897 he established Zinsser & Company, Inc.. The first product was called "Hastings Spirits", a refined wood alcohol or methanol.

The Zinsser plant attracted Hungarians, Poles, Hungarians, Czechs, and Russians who immigrated for work. By the start of World War I the Zinsser's plant had grown to 30 buildings. In 1917, the U.S. government established a mustard gas factory on the property - the production was at capacity of 75 tons of mustard gas per day by the time the armistice was signed. During the war, 200 National Guardsmen were stationed in Hastings because of the security interest of the chemical plants. At the same time Zinsser also served as a colonel in the US Army as assistant to William Walker, commander of the Chemical Warfare Service's Edgewood Arsenal in Baltimore, Maryland, where the army operated a mustard gas plant.

After the war, Zinsser took over the vacated government arsenal buildings, resumed and expanded the dye production. The plant was sold to Harshaw Chemical Company in 1955.

== Personal life ==
He married Emma Sharman, and they had three children.

Zinsser Park, in northwestern Hastings between Broadway and the Old Croton Aqueduct, is named for him.

== Bibliography ==
- James S Ketchum M D: Chemical Warfare Secrets Almost Forgotten. WestBow Press, 2012, ( at Google Books).
- Walter Isaacson and Evan Thomas: The Wise Men: Six Friends and the World They Made New York: Simon & Schuster, 1997;
