= Hastings Prototype House =

Historic house in New York, United States

- U.S. National Register of Historic Places
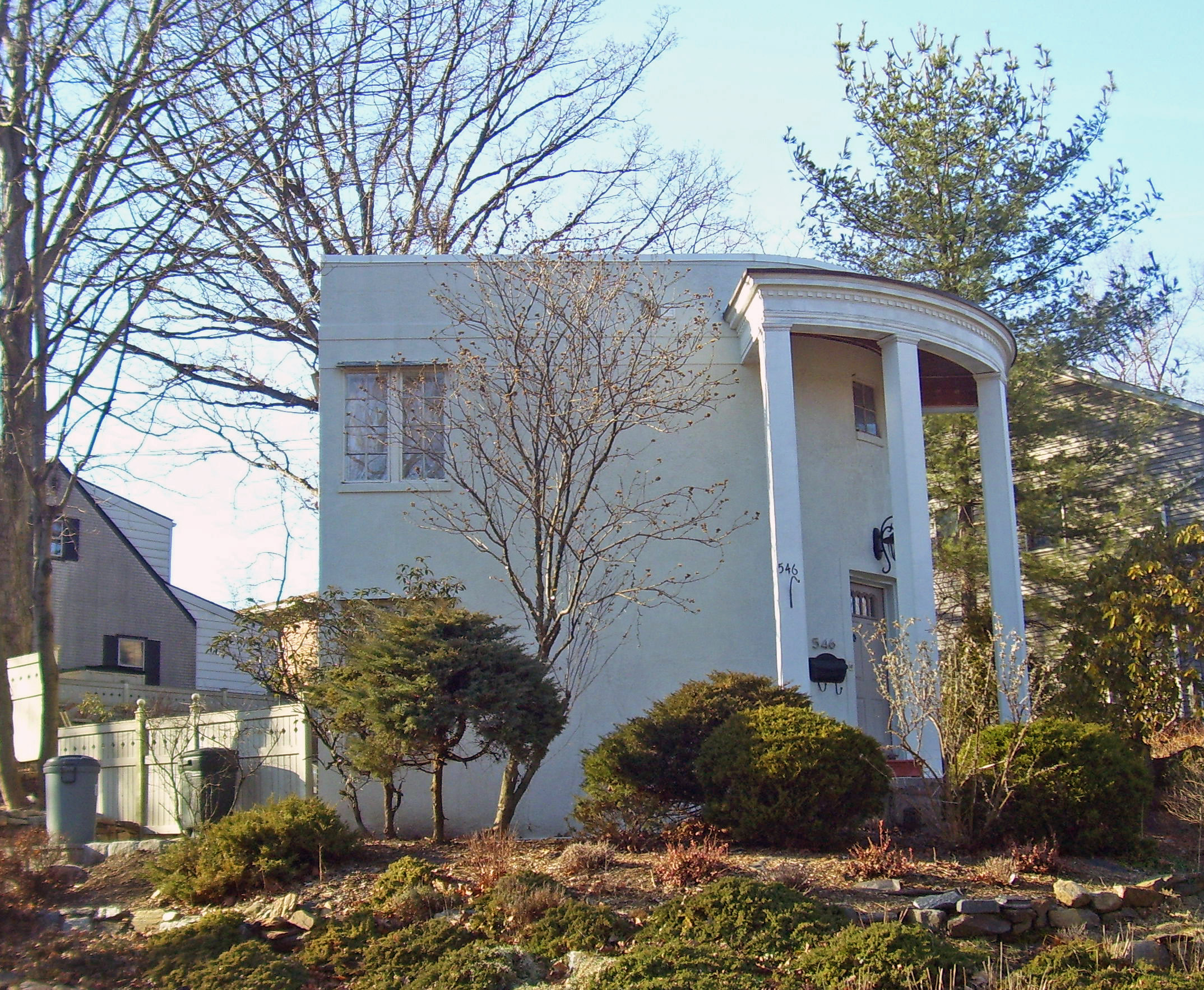
- South elevation, 2009

- Location within New York Location within the United States
- Location: Hastings-on-Hudson, NY
- Nearest city: Yonkers
- Coordinates: 40°59′4.5″N 73°52′16″W
- Area: 0.4 acres (1,600 m^{2})
- Built: 1936
- Architect: Charles Horn
- Architectural style: Moderne
- NRHP reference No.: 91001873
- Added to NRHP: December 19, 1991

The Hastings Prototype House is located at Farragut Parkway and High Street in Hastings-on-Hudson, New York, United States. It is a Moderne-style concrete building erected during the 1930s. In 1991 it was added to the National Register of Historic Places.

It was planned to be one of a number of experimental dwellings along Farragut Parkway, and, ultimately, a larger-scale development in Florida; neither of which was ever built. It incorporated many innovations, including a patented method of precasting the concrete panels used in its walls and floors and the first gas-fired heating system in Westchester County. These led to it being featured in an exhibit at the 1939 New York World's Fair.

The architect, developer and contractor were all local, and none of them involved with any of the contemporary movements that led to the Moderne style. Charles Horn, the architect, never built another building in that style. Unoccupied, it fell into disrepair in later years and was threatened with demolition after it became an eyesore. It was preserved in the 1980s when a man who had grown up in the neighborhood bought it, researched its history and restored it.

== Buildings and grounds ==
The house is located on the northwest corner of the intersection, approximately one-quarter mile (500 m) along Farragut from its intersection with the Saw Mill River Parkway. The surrounding neighborhood is exclusively residential, with some minimal commercial development a block to the north at the intersection of Farragut and Green Street. The houses to the west are in a variety of early 20th-century styles, on smaller lots. To the east are larger lots with more trees, most of them the rear yards of larger houses along Farragut Avenue.

The half-acre (2,000 m^{2}) lot slopes up slightly toward the west. In addition to the house, on the eastern end, a garage is built into the landscape to the north. It is considered a contributing resource to the National Register listing. A driveway curves around from High Street to it.

=== Exterior ===
The house itself is a 21-foot (6.4 m) cubical steel frame structure on a cinder block foundation faced in prefabricated 2-by-10-foot (0.61 by 3.05 m) concrete panels with stucco parging topped by a bowl-shaped roof centered on a drain. At the main entrance on the curved eastern corner, there is an entrance portico.

Fenestration consists primarily of paired steel eight-pane casement windows on both stories at either side of the corners. There is one small four-pane window in the second story above the main entrance and an additional window on the north of it in the first story to provide additional light to the kitchen. Just north of it is a second entrance, meant to allow easier access to the garage.

A plain wide belt course runs around the building above the second story windows. Above it is a parapet at the roofline. The front portico consists of a wooden hood with a denticulated cornice supported by four square wooden pillars topped with molded capitals.

=== Interior ===
The main entrance is a recessed paneled wooden door. It opens into a small foyer with closet. Three steps lead down from the south side to the living area, which occupies the bulk of the first-floor space and the greatest portion of the house's 800-square-foot (74 m^{2}) interior. The stairs to the second story begin on the opposite corner. Flooring consists of the same prefabricated concrete panels the walls are made of covered in asphalt tile; the walls are plaster and lath. A partition sets off the kitchen, in the northwest corner. Underneath the stairway is storage space and the original location of the heating and air conditioning controls.

Upstairs, there have been extensive renovations since the house was built. The floors are covered in ceramic tile and the walls are gypsum. The original six-panel wooden doors have been replaced with hollow-core flush doors as well. Its layout follows the first floor, with most of the southern space given over to a large bedroom and a smaller bedroom above the kitchen. Corresponding to the foyer is a bathroom. There is no basement, just crawl space.

=== Garage and landscaping ===
The driveway ends at the garage just north of, and uphill from, the house. It is made of the same prefabricated concrete panels and has a flat roof, sloped to one side. Inside there is space for a single car. A storage bin is suspended over where the hood would be parked. A window has been cut on the south side, facing the house, from one of the concrete panels. It has glazed doors and side panels and is now used as a studio.

Stone retaining walls on the west side of the driveway and parallel to the rear of the garage create a small courtyard between the house's kitchen door and the garage. This is part of the overall landscaping of the property. The west (rear) yard has a terraced feel to it with the stone wall and garage providing an abrupt break in elevation, and is sheltered and insulated from the neighborhood by several mature trees. A drop similar to that in the rear follows the natural slope of the terrain at the east (front), heavily worked and planted with an assortment of shrubs and small trees. To the south, facing High Street, more thick planting and mature trees further shelter the house and buffer it from its neighbors.

== History ==
The house was the first of what its developers hoped would be many they could replicate in two states with an innovative construction method and material. However, it proved more difficult to build than expected, and would be the only one of its kind. After falling into neglect a few decades after it was built, it has been restored by an early admirer.

=== 1929–1934: Suburbanization and opportunity ===
In the late 1920s Westchester County began the system of parkways that would make it possible for residents to commute by car to New York City. The first section of one, the Saw Mill, passed through the eastern section of the village of Hastings-on-Hudson. To complement the existing intersection between the parkway and Farragut Avenue, a new street, Farragut Parkway, was built to the southeast.

Its completion in 1934 opened up the neighborhood around it, an area known as Uniontown, to subdivision and development. Residents of newer houses would find downtown Hastings and the parkway equally accessible, and Hastings began transitioning from a small river town built around the large sugar refinery then located along its waterfront into a commuter suburb. Investors were already speculating heavily on Uniontown property.

One of them was Hamlin Andrus of the nearby city of Yonkers. The son of John Emory Andrus, a wealthy industrialist who had served as that city's mayor and representative in Congress earlier in the century, he invested his inherited share of the family fortune in various local opportunities, primarily but not exclusively in real estate. Instead of building in more common contemporary styles such as Tudor or Colonial Revival on the land he owned at Farragut Parkway and High Street, Andrus decided to experiment with modernist styles. While European architects like Albert Frey, Richard Neutra and William Lescaze had introduced the smooth-surfaced, unornamented Bauhaus-influenced forms of modernism to the U.S. in the preceding decade, their work had primarily been in Southern California or the downtowns of larger cities. Modernism had not received wide exposure to the American architectural community until a 1932 exhibit at the Museum of Modern Art.

Andrus's plan was to build a group of houses in the style on the Hastings property; and then, if they proved profitable, to build a larger development in Florida. He may have felt the use of prefabricated building materials and the sparseness of the style would make the houses more economical to build on the scale he planned, and thus more affordable in the Depression economy where traditional homes were too expensive for more than half the population. Concrete was not a common choice for houses in Westchester at the time, but it had history behind it. Six decades earlier, Highland Cottage, made entirely of precast concrete, had gone up in Ossining. Shortly afterward, the first reinforced concrete house in the country, Ward's Castle, had been built on the Connecticut state line in Rye Brook.

Many of the European proponents of modernism had been emigrating to the U.S. in the face of rising totalitarianism in their home countries that was often animated by a hostility to the social movements that underlay their architectural movement. Instead of working with them, Andrus commissioned local architect Charles Horn to design the first house. With no relevant experience or prior work in the style, he managed to produce a house that had the hallmarks of the Moderne style, the American interpretation of modernist principles—the use of synthetic industrial materials, smooth surface, curving corner, and extremely restrained decoration. Inside, the house gave over most of its efficiently used space to living and sleeping, the primary activities of a house, in keeping with the movement's philosophy that buildings should be honest about themselves and reflect the way people were actually living after industrialization.

=== 1934–1936: Construction ===
Andrus worked with another local businessman, Louis Gelbman of Yonkers, an innovator who held 16 patents, to develop the concrete panels and their manufacturing process, which were also patented. Concrete and cinder were poured into a mold of steel bars that resembled a waffle iron. When they dried, the inch-thick (2.5 cm) panels looked like exaggerated C's, with six-inch (18 cm) returns as the arms. They were light enough that two men could carry each one, yet solid enough that none had begun to deteriorate when the house was renovated half a century later.

Gelbman's workers assembled them on the site by bolting the arms to a partial steel frame on the interior so the exterior would remain flush and smooth after being sealed with a mortar parge and surfaced with stucco. The arms left a space inside for insulation, usually vermiculite, another new material at the time, that would go behind the plywood panels used for the walls. To build floors, the panels were just laid horizontally on the summer beams, with the floor's surface material (asphalt on the first story, cork originally upstairs) then laid on top, and the space between the arms available for infrastructure piping. Once the exterior was done, the openings for the doors and windows were cut and then they were installed.

The steel casement windows were also a relatively new building technology; however, their use and popularity was not limited to modernist buildings. Inside the building were more new products, such as fluorescent lighting and one of the first forced-air gas heating and cooling systems installed in Westchester. The heating was efficient enough that the fireplace hearth in the first floor living space could be reduced in size. Air conditioning was a very new feature for private homes at the time; it is possible that this reflected Andrus's hope to build similar homes in Florida.

Construction was longer and more complicated than Andrus and Gelbman had expected. Surviving photographs from it suggest that it was not easy to assemble the panels, as workers were not used to it. Measures to protect the patent on the concrete panels also slowed it down.

=== 1937–present: Decline and restoration ===
Despite all the house's innovative technologies being included in an exhibit at the 1939 New York World's Fair, other builders did not adopt prefabricated concrete construction, except for occasional ranch houses, not because of its newness as much as their familiarity with existing construction materials and methods.

The house was controversial with its neighbors, as well. Many felt it clashed too strongly with their own more traditionally-styled houses, and were outspoken in their criticism. Some likened it to an appliance. Andrus may well have decided it was not worth it to build more either in Hastings or Florida, and found other investment opportunities. Horn never designed another modernist building.

After its completion, it was sold and occupied at least through the middle of the century. Eventually it grew vacant, and began to show signs of neglect. The neighbors, including those who had never liked the house, called for its demolition as an eyesore.

That was prevented in 1978, when Peter Muckenhaupt, a retired journalist and publicist who had watched the house being built as a boy when he lived nearby, bought the house. He began restoring it in earnest. It was necessary to remove the original walls. The broken window panes and HVAC systems had to be replaced, and the once-groundbreaking gas-fired system was now obsolete. "We wound up having to replace everything," he recalled. "It had to be treated like a brand-new house." The original cork flooring and plywood paneled walls on the second story were beyond repair and were replaced with the ceramic tile and gypsum walls now in place.

After the work was done in the early 1980s, Muckenhaupt rented it out since his family was too large for him to move them in. He researched the history of the house, finding little material but enough to support its successful nomination to the National Register. Once that had been achieved, he planned to move into the house.

== See also ==
- National Register of Historic Places listings in southern Westchester County, New York
