= Greystone station =

Metro-North Railroad station in New York

Greystone
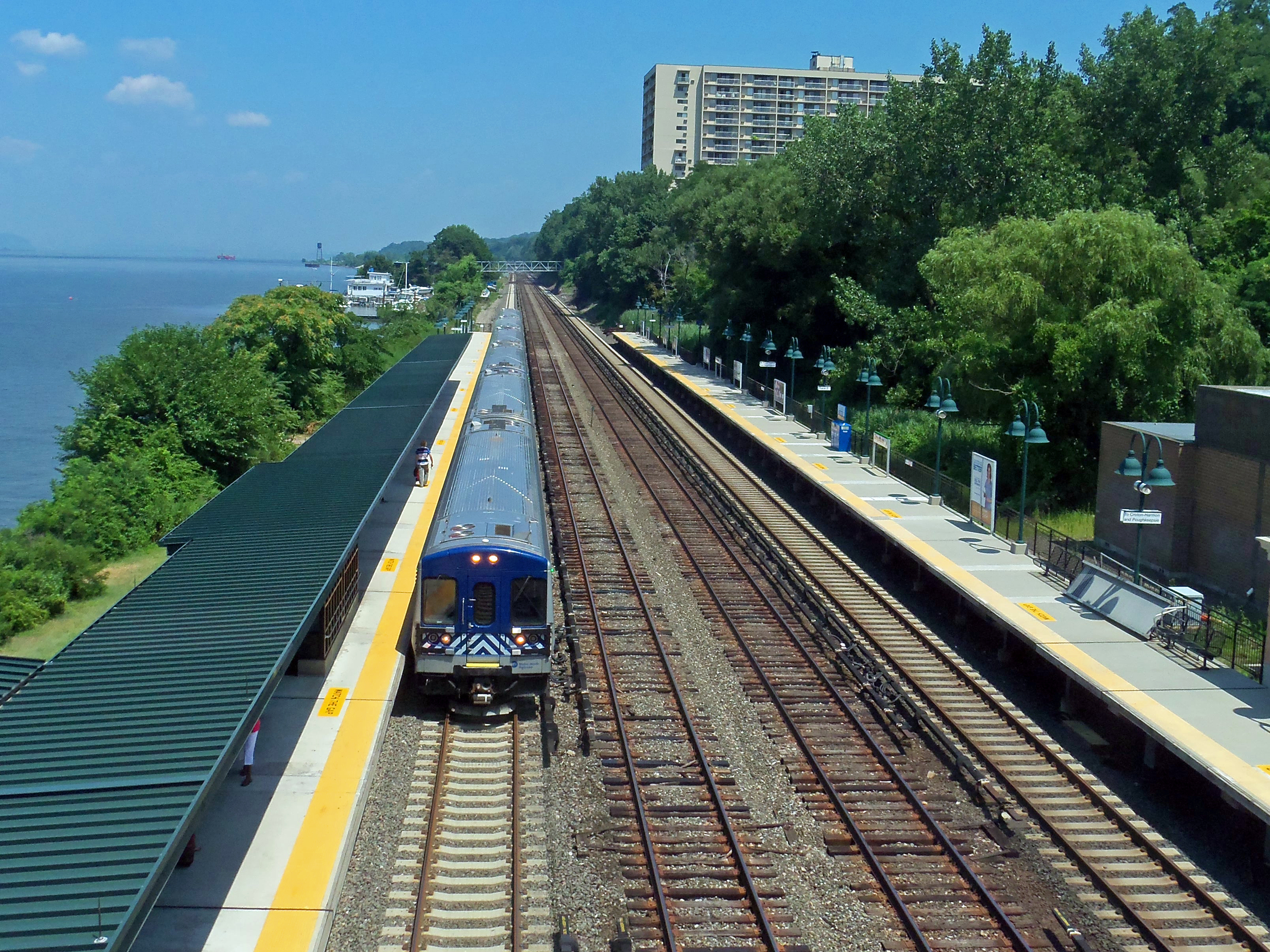
- A train arriving at Greystone station in 2011

General information
- Location: 61 Harriman Avenue, Yonkers, New York
- Coordinates: 40.9721°N 73.8896°W
- Line: Hudson Line
- Platforms: 2 side platforms
- Tracks: 4
- Connections: Bee-Line Bus System: 1C, 1T, 1W

Construction
- Parking: 250 spaces
- Accessible: yes

Other information
- Fare zone: 3

History
- Opened: 1899
- Former names: Harriman (1899–1910)

Passengers
- 2018: 594 (Metro-North)
- Rank: 68 of 109

Services
Preceding station	Metro-North Railroad	Following station
Hastings-on-Hudson toward Croton–Harmon	Hudson Line	Glenwood toward Grand Central

Former services
Preceding station	New York Central Railroad	Following station
Hastings-on-Hudson toward Peekskill	Hudson Division	Glenwood toward New York
Location

Greystone station is a commuter rail station on the Metro-North Railroad Hudson Line, located in the Greystone neighborhood of Yonkers, New York. The station has two high-level side platforms, each eight cars long, serving the outer tracks of the four-track line.

== History ==
Greystone station was originally built in 1899 by developer Charles Harriman as "Harriman station" for the New York Central and Hudson River Railroad, who insisted that he rename the station "Greystone" in 1910. A pedestrian bridge was built in 1915. As with many NYCRR stations in Westchester County, the station became a Penn Central station upon the merger between NYC and Pennsylvania Railroad in 1968, until it was taken over by Conrail in 1976, and then by Metro-North in 1983.
