= Carsey School of Public Policy =

Public policy school at the University of New Hampshire

- Type: Public
- Established: 2013
- Location: Durham, New Hampshire, United States
- Website: carsey.unh.edu

The Carsey School of Public Policy at the University of New Hampshire is located in Huddleston Hall, on the campus of the University of New Hampshire in Durham. The Carsey School is widely known for its research, policy education, and civic engagement work. The school publishes policy-relevant research briefs, offers four master’s degree programs, and brings people together for thoughtful dialogue to address societal challenges.

== History ==
University of New Hampshire alumna Marcy Peterson Carsey, a 1966 cum laude graduate in English literature and the producer of such television shows as The Cosby Show, Roseanne, Grace Under Fire, 3rd Rock from the Sun, and That '70s Show, established the Carsey Institute through a financial gift to the University in May 2002. In 2013, Marcy Carsey gave a second gift of $20 million to the University of New Hampshire to establish a school of public policy. This gift is the second largest in UNH’s history.

In June 2014, Founding Director Michael Ettlinger joined the Carsey School of Public Policy, arriving from his post as a senior director at the Pew Charitable Trusts. Following his departure in January 2023 to return to policy work in Washington, DC, Daniel Bromberg—Carsey’s former director of academic programs and associate professor—became the interim director. In July 2024, Stephen Bird joined Carsey as director, arriving from Clarkson University where he had established himself as a world-renowned and highly productive researcher in the fields of energy and environmental policy and as an award-winning professor and scholar.

== Publications and Research ==
The Carsey School produces briefs that analyze complex data on pressing issues grounded in real-world conditions and tied to current policy debates. Current areas of interest include population trends, sustainable community development and finance, health, civic engagement, child care, public finance, and much more. The Carsey School also publishes a variety of briefs specific to New Hampshire.

== Academic Programs ==
The Carsey School offers four graduate degrees, including a Master in Community Development, a Master of Global Conflict and Human Security, a Master of Public Administration, and Master in Public Policy. Master in Public Policy students can also pursue a Master in Public Policy/Juris Doctor. In addition to its graduate degrees, the Carsey School offers public facilitator training through New Hampshire Listens and offers a wide range of applied practitioner trainings in community development and equitable climate finance through the Center for Impact Finance.

=== Master in Community Development ===
Geared toward working professionals, the Master in Community Development program prepares students for careers in community and economic development. Students learn the basis of community engagement and establish a foundation in sustainable and effective community development practices. A one-year executive degree option is available for this degree.

=== Master in Global Conflict and Human Security ===
In the Master of Global Conflict and Human Security program, students acquire skills in international development policy and practice to build resilient societies in countries affected by state fragility, humanitarian crises, and conflict. They develop essential skills in data collection and analysis as well as project monitoring and evaluation.

=== Master of Public Administration ===
In the Master of Public Administration program, the curriculum includes courses that cover concepts from management, public policy, budgeting, and planning, providing students with a well-rounded understanding of what it means to run an organization in the public and nonprofit sectors. A one-year executive degree option is available for this degree.

=== Master in Public Policy ===
In the Master in Public Policy program, students engage in opportunities designed to deepen and broaden their education through meetings in Washington, DC, with key policymakers, government agencies, advocacy groups, and more while gaining practical experience through policy internships and capstone projects.

== Research Centers and Programs ==
The Carsey School oversees or contributes to a variety of programs and research centers, including the Center for Demography, the Center for Engaged Communities, New Hampshire Listens, the Center for Impact Finance, the Center for Social Policy in Practice, and the Changemaker Collaborative.

=== Center for Demography ===
Population change exerts a significant impact on communities, families, and institutions. The Center for Demography engages in demographic research to inform public policy. Senior Demographer Kenneth Johnson is a regular go-to for major media outlets and policy groups because of his expertise and ability to explain demographic information to a broad audience.

=== Center for Engaged Communities ===
The Center for Engaged Communities is the home of NH Listens and expanding research on civic health and social trust. EnCo bridges the gap between people and policy. The Center supports communities and organizations in building strong pathways for civic participation, skills for navigating controversy, and reliable information to guide the way. In 2017, NH Listens received an American Civic Collaboration Award, a Civvy, for its efforts to strengthen communities.

=== Center for Social Policy in Practice ===
The Center for Social Policy in Practice collects, analyzes, and translates data that community stakeholders can use to design and deliver equity-enhancing programs and policies. The Center has special expertise in finding stories in messy data, focusing on topics that expose inequalities, and identifying methods for addressing them. It is home to the NH Early Care and Education (ECE) Research Consortium, which works to coordinate applied research on the state’s ECE system.

=== Changemaker Collaborative ===
The Changemaker Collaborative at UNH is a joint partnership of UNH’s Sustainability Institute, the Peter T. Paul College of Business & Economics, and the Carsey School of Public Policy.

== Funders ==
The Carsey School is funded through the support of philanthropic institutions, public and non-profit agencies, individuals, and a founding gift endowed by Marcy Carsey. Some of the school's funders have included Annie E. Casey, Couch Family Foundation, Everyday Democracy, Carnegie Corporation of New York, JPMorgan Chase Bank, NASA, National Science Foundation, U.S. Department of Education, Volunteer NH, Washington Center for Equitable Growth, The Mastercard Foundation, Regional Economic Development Center, and many other foundations and private donors.

== Notable faculty ==
- Jake Sullivan, Carsey School senior fellow; former United States National Security Advisor to President Joe Biden
- David Finkelhor, senior fellow and a Master in Public Policy professor; American sociologist known for his research into child sexual abuse and related topics

== Fellowships ==
The Carsey School offers research fellowships to graduate and undergraduate students at UNH.

=== Governor John G. Winant Fellowship ===
The Winant fellowship program was established at the University of New Hampshire in 1982 in memory of New Hampshire Governor John Gilbert Winant (1889-1947) to encourage the professional development of undergraduates with a strong commitment to public service. The fellowship pays a generous stipend for a summer internship with a New Hampshire nonprofit organization or government agency, recognizing exceptional students with an interest in the nonprofit and public sectors and providing valuable work experience in the field of public service.

=== Judge William W. Treat Fellowship ===
The Treat Fellowship program was established at the University of New Hampshire in 2018 in memory of the late New Hampshire Judge William W. Treat to provide undergraduate students a platform for facilitating and engaging in conversations across differences. Treat Fellows design and facilitate campus conversations, work off-campus with youth leaders in area schools, and foster multi-partisan understanding with regional and state policy leaders.

=== Master in Public Policy Fellowship ===
The Carsey School is pleased to offer paid policy-related fellowships to Master in Public Policy (MPP) students, enabling them to earn and learn while enrolled in the MPP program. Fellowship positions last for two semesters (typically commencing in the fall and concluding the following spring) with student fellows working approximately 15 hours per week while classes are in session.

=== S. Melvin Rines Fellowship ===
S. Melvin Rines (UNH ’47 graduate) created the S. Melvin Rines Fellowship at the Carsey School of Public policy to help prepare students for a rewarding career and future leadership roles within the finance field in Africa. The Fellowship provides a partial tuition award to students who enroll in the Master in Community Development program at the Carsey School.
