= Dobbs Ferry station =

Metro-North Railroad station in New York

Dobbs Ferry
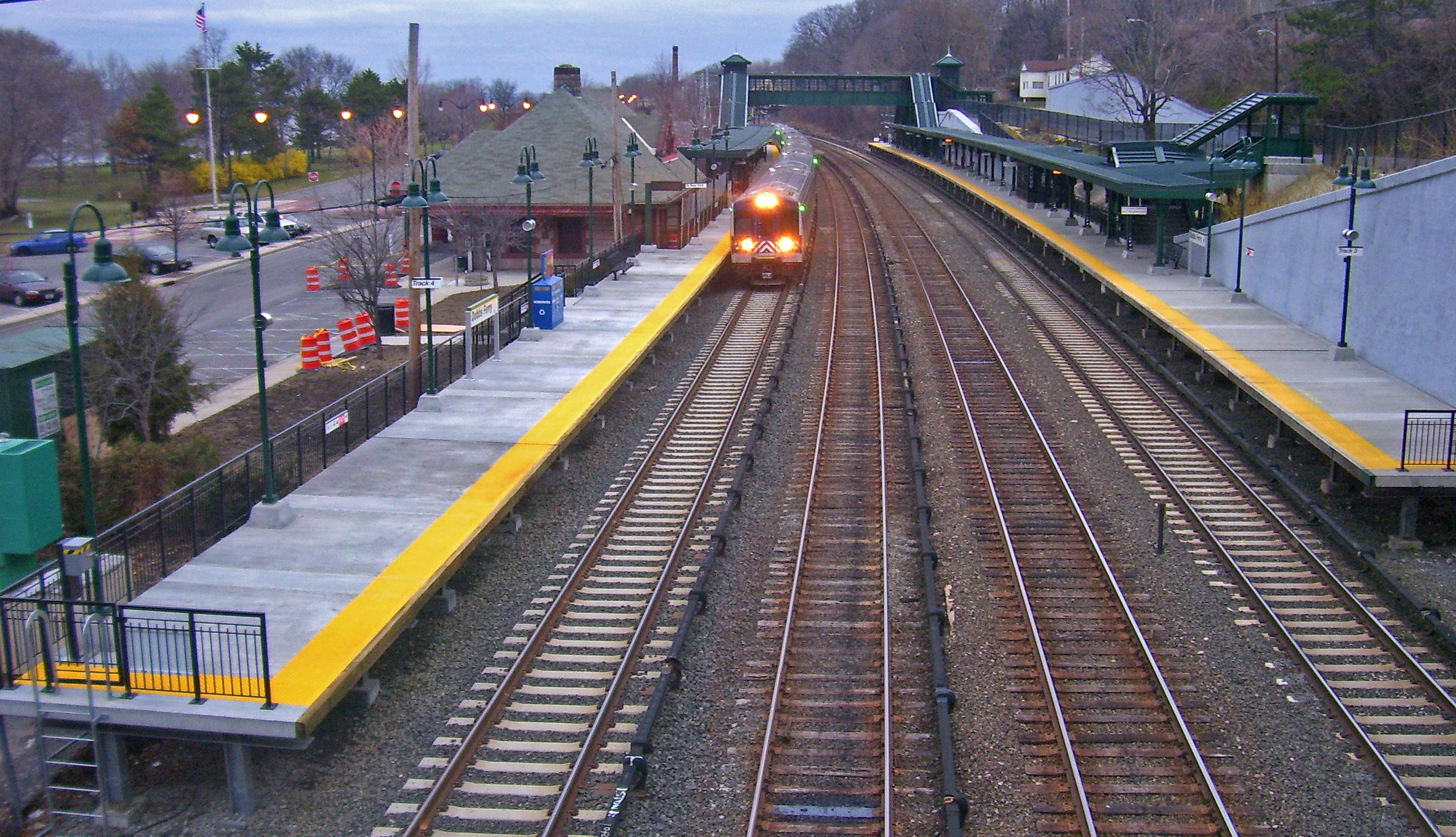
- Southbound train stopping at Dobbs Ferry in 2008

General information
- Location: 11 Station Plaza, Dobbs Ferry, New York
- Coordinates: 41°00′45″N 73°52′46″W
- Line: Hudson Line
- Platforms: 2 side platforms
- Tracks: 4
- Connections: Bee-Line Bus System: 1C, 1T, 1W, 6, 66

Construction
- Parking: 576 spaces

Other information
- Fare zone: 4

History
- Opened: September 29, 1849
- Rebuilt: 1889, 2006–2008

Passengers
- 2018: 1,571 (Metro-North)
- Rank: 40 of 109

Services
Preceding station	Metro-North Railroad	Following station
Ardsley-on-Hudson toward Croton–Harmon	Hudson Line	Hastings-on-Hudson toward Grand Central

Former services
Preceding station	New York Central Railroad	Following station
Ardsley-on-Hudson toward Peekskill	Hudson Division	Hastings-on-Hudson toward New York
Location

Dobbs Ferry station is a commuter rail stop on the Metro-North Railroad's Hudson Line, located in Dobbs Ferry, New York.

== History ==
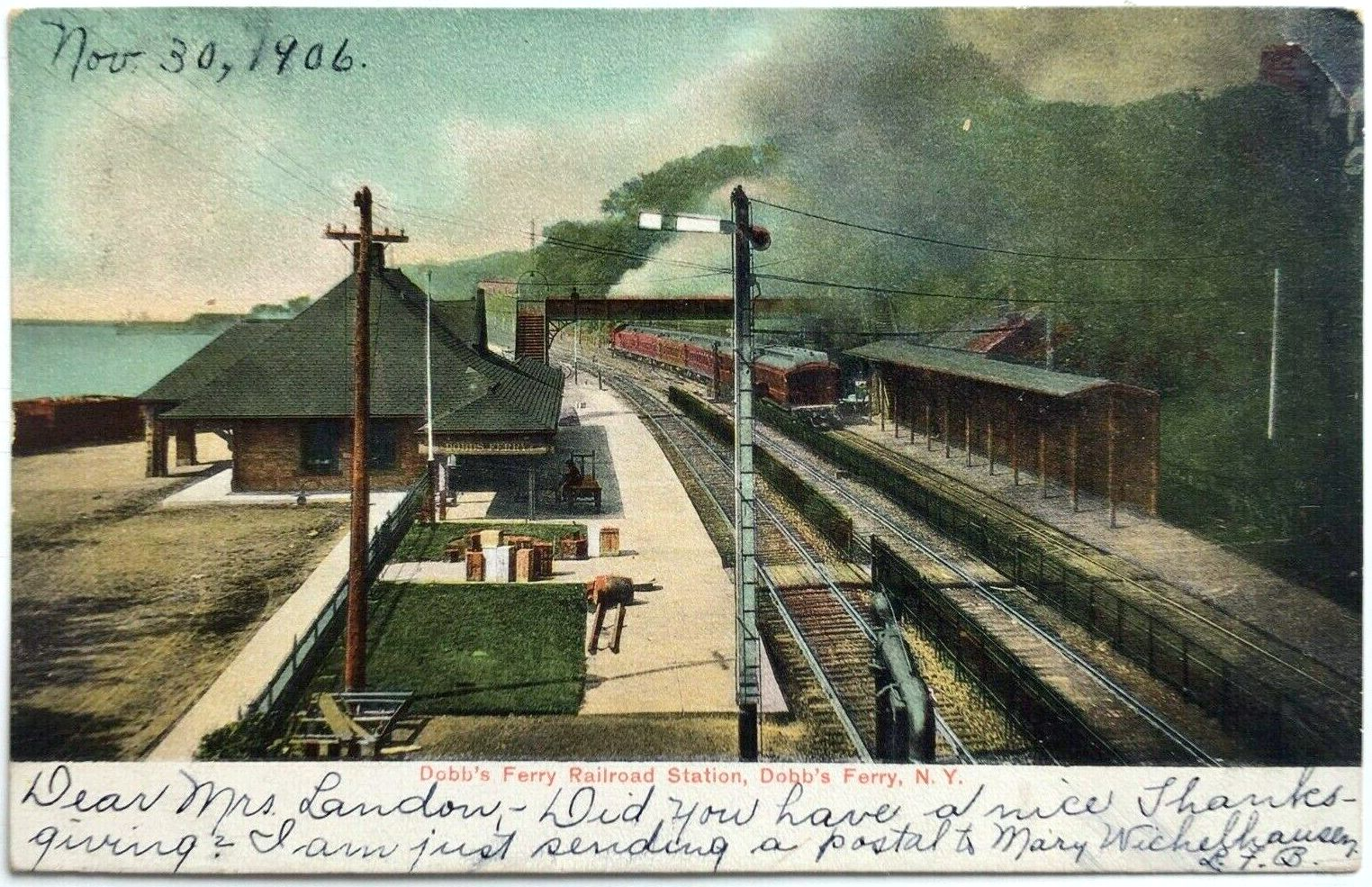
The station depicted in a 1906 postcard

Dobbs Ferry station opened on September 29, 1849 with its origins as part of the Hudson River Railroad. The current station house, which was built in 1889 by the New York Central and Hudson River Railroad, became a Penn Central station upon the merger between NYC and Pennsylvania Railroad in 1968 like many NYCRR stations in Westchester County, until it was taken over by Conrail in 1976, and then by Metro-North Railroad in 1983. It was restored between 2006 and 2008 by Metro-North. The station house is now a local bar and grille.

== Station layout ==
The station has two slightly offset high-level side platforms–each eight cars long. The two inner tracks, one of which does not include a third rail, are used by trains that do not stop at the station.
