= Hastings-on-Hudson station =

Metro-North Railroad station in New York

Hastings-on-Hudson
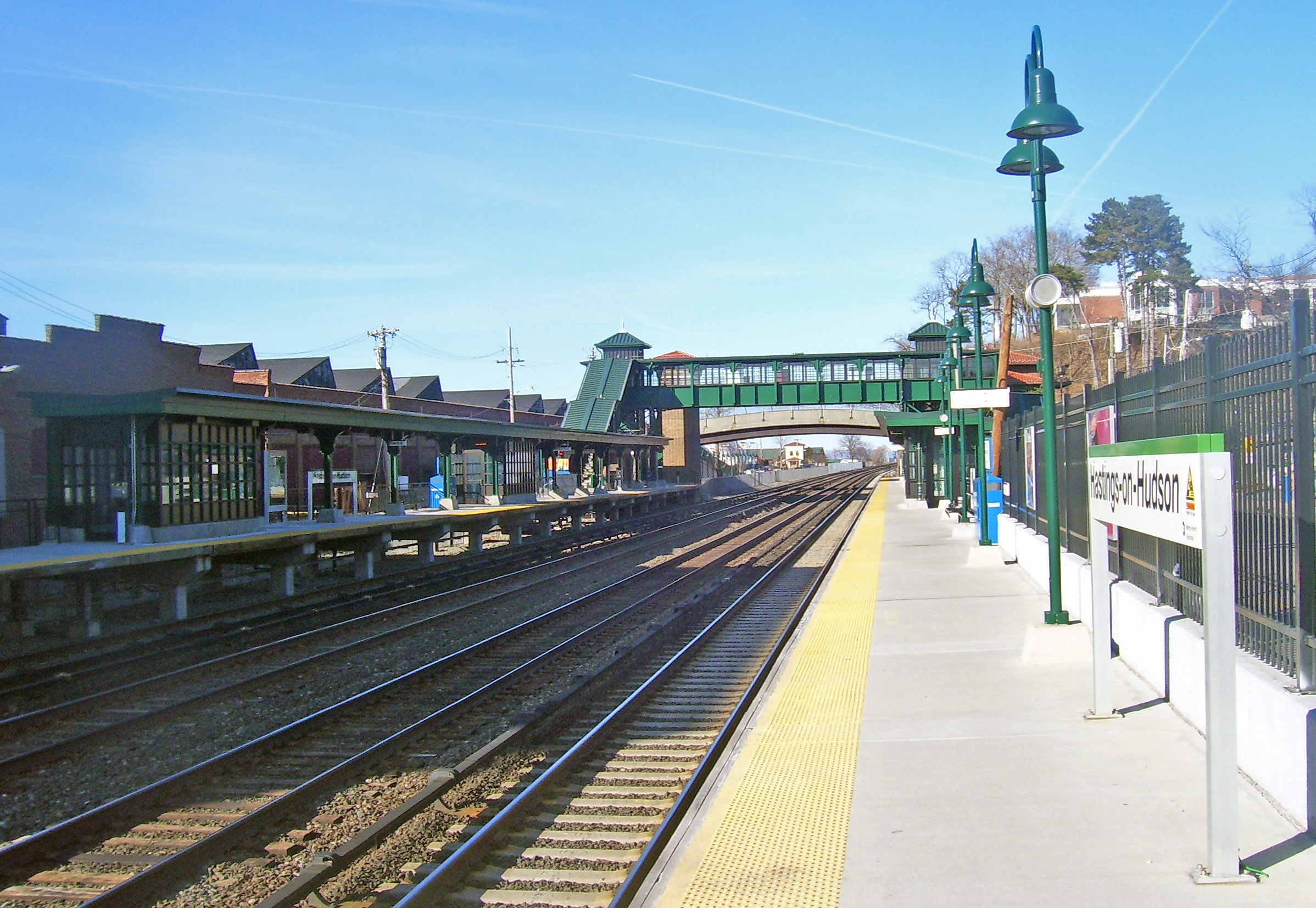
- View north along tracks

General information
- Location: 134 Southside Avenue, Hastings-on-Hudson, New York
- Coordinates: 40°59′41″N 73°53′05″W
- Line: Hudson Line/Metro-North Railroad
- Platforms: 2 side platforms
- Tracks: 4
- Connections: Bee-Line Bus System: 6, 1C, 1T, 1W

Construction
- Accessible: yes

Other information
- Fare zone: 4

History
- Opened: September 29, 1849
- Rebuilt: 1910
- Electrified: 700V (DC) third rail

Passengers
- 2018: 1,475 (Metro-North)
- Rank: 42 of 109

Services
Preceding station	Metro-North Railroad	Following station
Dobbs Ferry toward Croton–Harmon	Hudson Line	Greystone toward Grand Central

Former services
Preceding station	New York Central Railroad	Following station
Dobbs Ferry toward Peekskill	Hudson Division	Greystone toward New York
Location

Hastings-on-Hudson station is a commuter rail stop on the Metro-North Railroad's Hudson Line, located in Hastings-on-Hudson, New York.

== History ==
Hastings-on-Hudson has had railroad service from as far back as the 1840s, pre-dating the Hudson River Railroad, and served both passengers and a local sugar refinery. In 1875, a major fire destroyed the waterfront, and the company running the sugar refinery left town, but other industries ended up taking its place.

The current Hastings-on-Hudson station building was built in 1910 by the New York Central Railroad. As with many NYCRR stations in Westchester County, the station became a Penn Central station upon the merger between NYC and Pennsylvania Railroad in 1968, until it was taken over by Conrail in 1976, and then by Metro-North Railroad in 1983.

== Station layout ==
The station has two slightly offset high-level side platforms each eight cars long. The inner tracks not next to either platform are used by express trains, only one of the express tracks is powered.
