= Meniconi =

Meniconi is an Italian surname. Notable people with the surname include:

- Enzo Meniconi (1950–2008), Italian film editor
- Furio Meniconi (1924–1981), Italian actor
- Giovanni Paolo Meniconi (1629–1694), Italian Roman Catholic prelate and Bishop of Bagnoregio
- Nello Meniconi, Italian film producer

== See also ==
- Menconi
