= Michael Ettlinger =

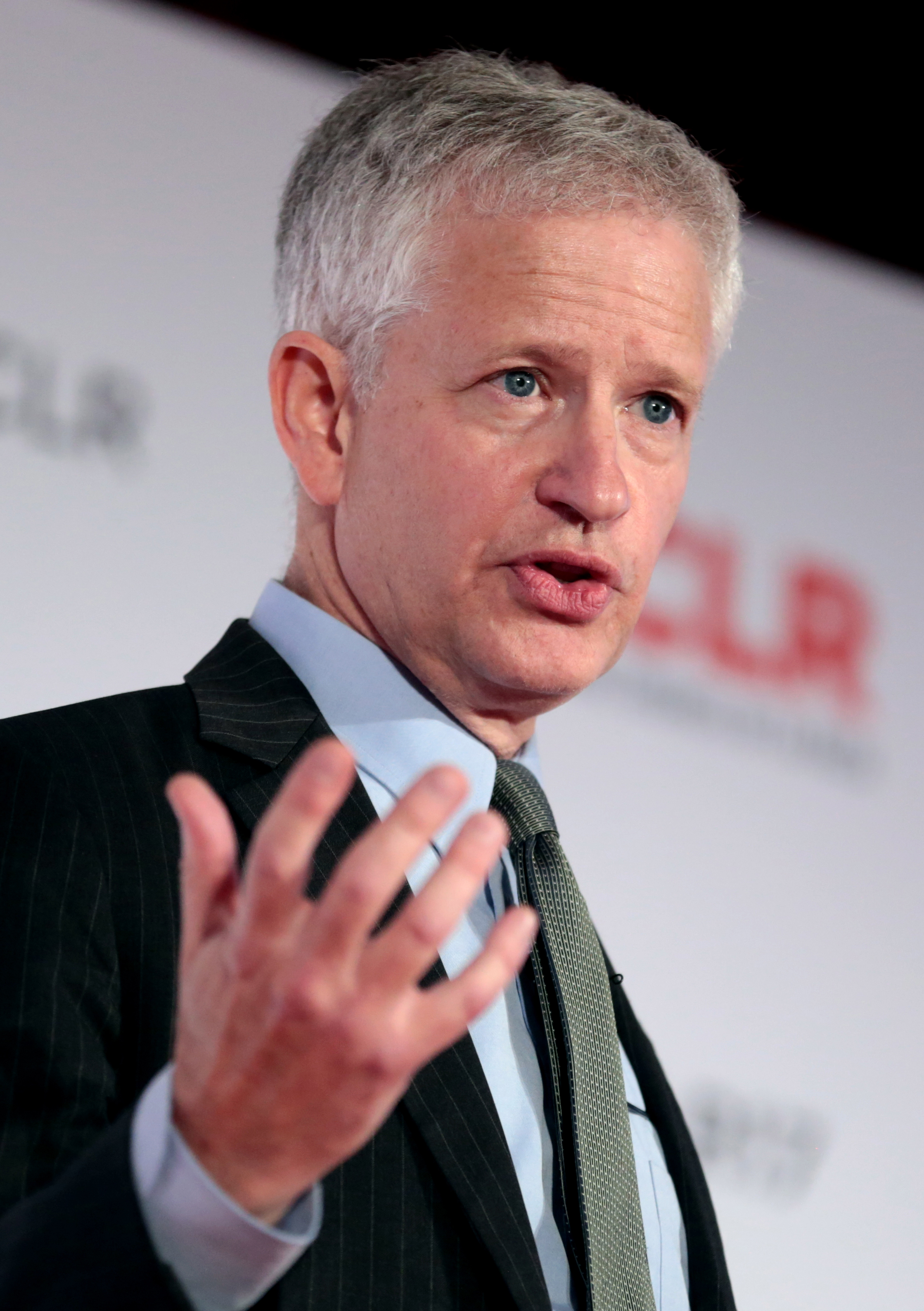
Michael Ettlinger (2017)

Michael Ettlinger is a public policy expert, administrator, educator and political advisor in the United States. He is a senior fellow at the Institute on Taxation and Economic Policy, a senior fellow at the Carsey School of Public Policy at the University of New Hampshire (where he previously served as the founding director), and an independent author. Ettlinger is a fellow with the National Academy of Public Administration, a member of the Federal Reserve Bank of Boston New England Public Policy Center Advisory Board, and a board member of the Just Jobs Network. He is also a fellow at the Warren Rudman Center for Justice, Leadership and Public Service and an Affiliate Professor of Law at the Franklin Pierce School of Law. Ettlinger has been called a "Moneyball All-Star" by Results for America an organization that works for effective and efficient government. In March of 2026 Ettlinger, as part of an initiative commemorating the 250th anniversary of the Declaration of Independence, was named one of 250 public service champions by the National Academy of Public Administration and LocGov250.

Michael Ettlinger was previously the volunteer co-lead of the Regional Economics and Battleground States Subcommittee of the Biden-Harris campaign's Economic Policy Committee (Joe Biden 2020 presidential campaign), Director of Economic Policy Planning for the pre-election Clinton-Kaine Presidential Transition, Senior Director for Fiscal and Economic Policy Portfolio at the Pew Charitable Trusts, Vice-President for Economic Policy at the Center for American Progress, Director of the Economic Analysis and Research Network at the Economic Policy Institute, Tax Policy Director at the Institute on Taxation and Economic Policy, Tax Policy Director at Citizens for Tax Justice, Counsel at the New York State Assembly, as well holding positions at Public Campaign, Vietnam Veterans of America, the National Veterans Legal Services Project and as a volunteer immigration lawyer for the American Civil Liberties Union. His analysis and research has appeared in a wide range of publications, he has testified before Congress and many state legislatures, and he has been frequently quoted in the print media and been a guest on television and radio news and public affairs programs.

Ettlinger was previously on the advisory group for the Groundwork Collaborative and served on the boards of the Ballot Initiative Strategy Center, Public Works and the Center for Policy Alternatives. He was a commissioner on the Maryland Business Tax Reform Commission.

== Early life ==
Ettlinger was born in New York City to Adrian Ettlinger and Carol Ettlinger. He grew up in Hastings-on-Hudson. Ettlinger attended Cornell University, where he earned a Bachelor of Science degree in electrical engineering, and American University, Washington College of Law, where he earned his Juris Doctor.

== Career ==
Ettlinger started his career as a staff attorney at Vietnam Veterans of America Legal Services, where he worked on federal legislation and represented veterans in legal proceedings. Subsequently he served as counsel to Richard L. Brodsky in the New York State Assembly, where he worked on government ethics and regulating alcohol use at sporting events, among other issues.

Ettlinger returned to Washington to be State Tax Policy Director, and then Tax Policy Director, at Citizens for Tax Justice (CTJ) and the Institute for Taxation and Economic Policy (ITEP). While at CTJ and ITEP, Ettlinger designed and built the ITEP tax microsimulation model. At the time, it was one of very few non-governmental U.S. tax microsimulation models and the only one to comprehensively model state-level, as well as national, taxes—including income, property and consumption taxes. In his 11 years at CTJ/ITEP Ettlinger was, in some way, involved in most major tax debates at the federal or state level. He frequently appeared in the media, was consulted by policymakers and testified before legislative bodies. After CTJ and ITEP Ettlinger served as Deputy Director of Public Campaign, an organization which promoted public financing of election campaigns.

At the Economic Policy Institute (EPI) Ettlinger was the director of the Economic Analysis and Research Network. In that role he led the institute's work to advance a progressive economic policy agenda at the state level, initiated a joint internship program with Howard University and the University of Texas–Pan American (now merged into the University of Texas Rio Grande Valley) and worked on national and state tax policy issues. At EPI Ettlinger worked in support of several successful state level minimum wage ballot initiatives.

Starting in early 2008, Ettlinger was the Vice President for Economic Policy at the Center for American Progress (CAP). As the head of the economic policy team at the dawn of an Obama administration with which CAP was closely associated, during the worst recession since the Great Depression, Ettlinger led a team that was highly involved in the most salient policy issues of the period. He developed, and led and supervised the development of, progressive economic policies and advocated for them. He particularly worked on an equity-focused paradigm and middle-class focus for economic policy, support for increased stimulus as the economic recovery disappointed and the intersection of economic policy with other policy areas such as clean energy and health care.

From 2013 to 2014, at the Pew Charitable Trusts, as Director of Economic and Fiscal Policy Portfolio, Ettlinger led a team that worked on a broad range of issues including fiscal policy, government effectiveness, immigration, and economic data collection and analysis.

In July 2014 Ettlinger became the founding director of the Carsey School of Public Policy at the University of New Hampshire. He also is an Affiliate Professor of Law at the University of New Hampshire's Franklin Pierce School of Law and is a Faculty Fellow at the Law School's Warren B. Rudman Center for Justice, Leadership, and Public Policy.

Ettlinger also served as the Director of Economic Policy Planning for the pre-election Clinton-Kaine Presidential Transition and as the volunteer co-lead of the Regional Economics and Battleground States Subcommittee of the Biden-Harris campaign's Economic Policy Committee (Joe Biden 2020 presidential campaign).

In February 2023, Ettlinger left his director position at the Carsey School and became a part-time senior fellow at the Institute on Taxation and Economic Policy as well as working on other issues.

In 2016 several emails from Ettlinger to John Podesta were stolen in the Podesta emails incident. This resulted in strong criticism by the New Hampshire Union Leader and some Republicans in the state.
