= Glenwood station (Metro-North) =

Metro-North Railroad station in New York

Glenwood
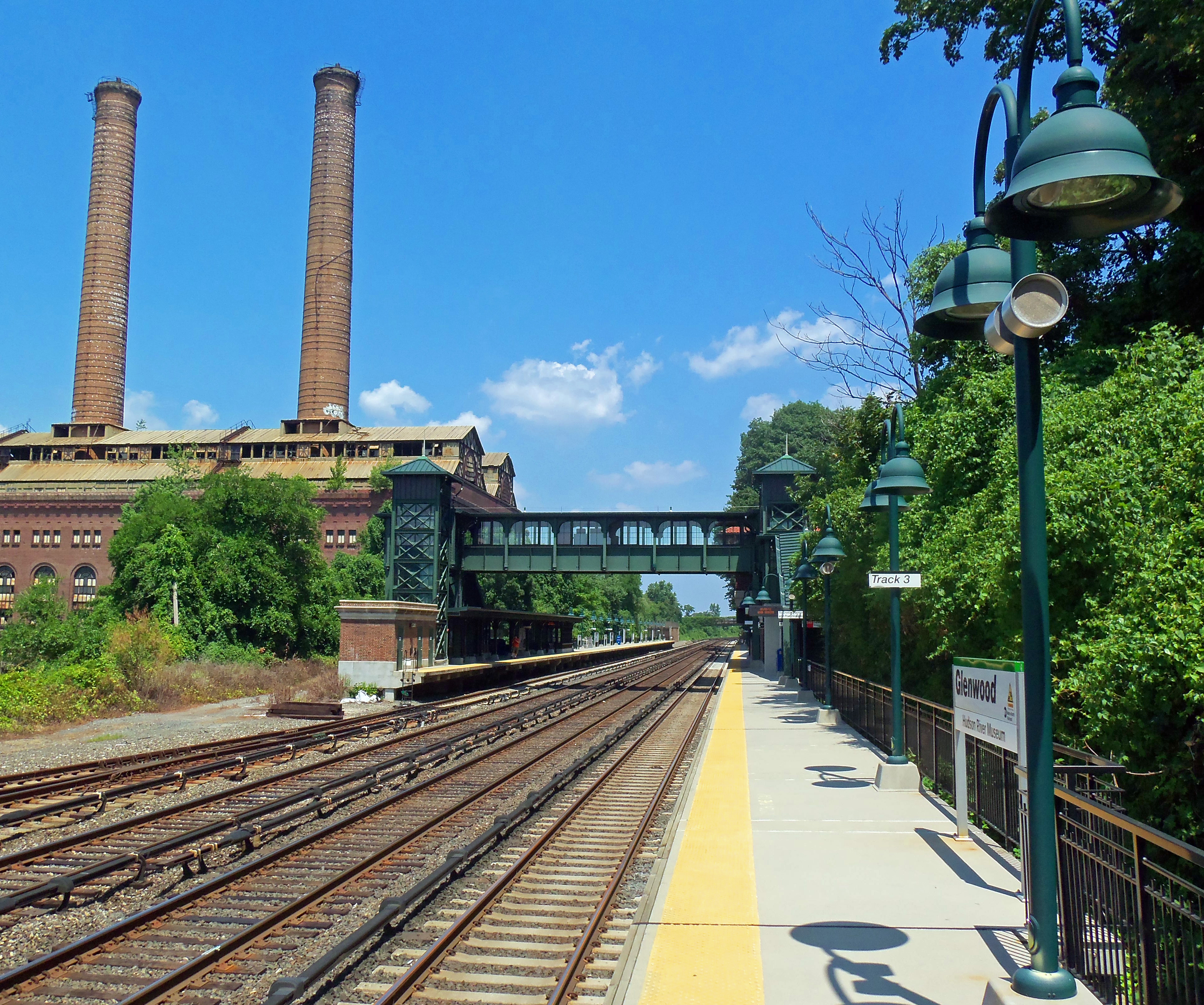
- Northbound view of the station and the nearby former NYC&HR Power Plant

General information
- Location: 2 Glenwood Avenue, Yonkers, New York
- Coordinates: 40.9506°N 73.8991°W
- Line: Hudson Line
- Platforms: 2 side platforms
- Tracks: 4
- Connections: Bee-Line Bus System: 1C, 1T, 1W

Construction
- Accessible: yes

Other information
- Fare zone: 3

History
- Electrified: 700V (DC) third rail

Passengers
- 2018: 466 (Metro-North)
- Rank: 76 of 109

Services
Preceding station	Metro-North Railroad	Following station
Greystone toward Croton–Harmon	Hudson Line	Yonkers toward Grand Central

Former services
Preceding station	New York Central Railroad	Following station
Greystone toward Peekskill	Hudson Division	Yonkers toward New York
Location

Glenwood station is a commuter rail stop on the Metro-North Railroad's Hudson Line, located in the Glenwood neighborhood of Yonkers, New York.

== Station layout ==
The station has two slightly offset high-level side platforms each able to accommodate eight cars.

== Abandoned power plant ==
Between the Glenwood station and the Hudson River lies the abandoned Yonkers Power Station of the New York Central & Hudson River Railroad, a massive building which was constructed in 1907 to hold electrical generators to provide power for the electrification of the railroad.

In 2008 the Preservation League of New York State named the plant as one of the seven most endangered sites in the state, and in 2013 the building began to be renovated into the "PowerHouse", an "arts-focused event complex with eventual plans for restaurants, a hotel and a marina." Phase One of the conversion is expected to finish in 2016 at the cost of $70 million, while Phase Two, which includes the restaurant, hotel and marina, is expected to cost $80 million, and could take up to ten years to complete.

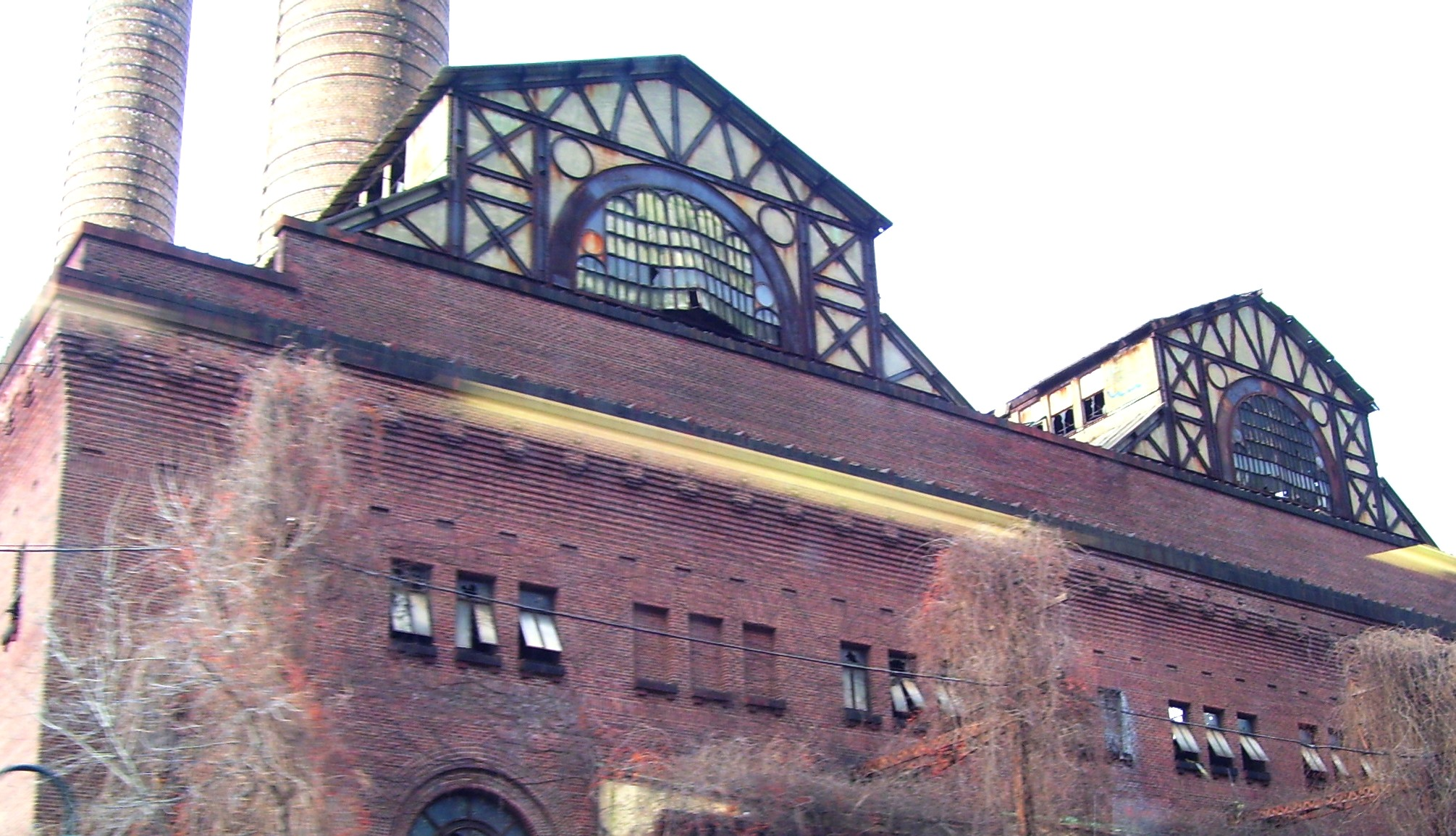
Abandoned Yonkers Power Station

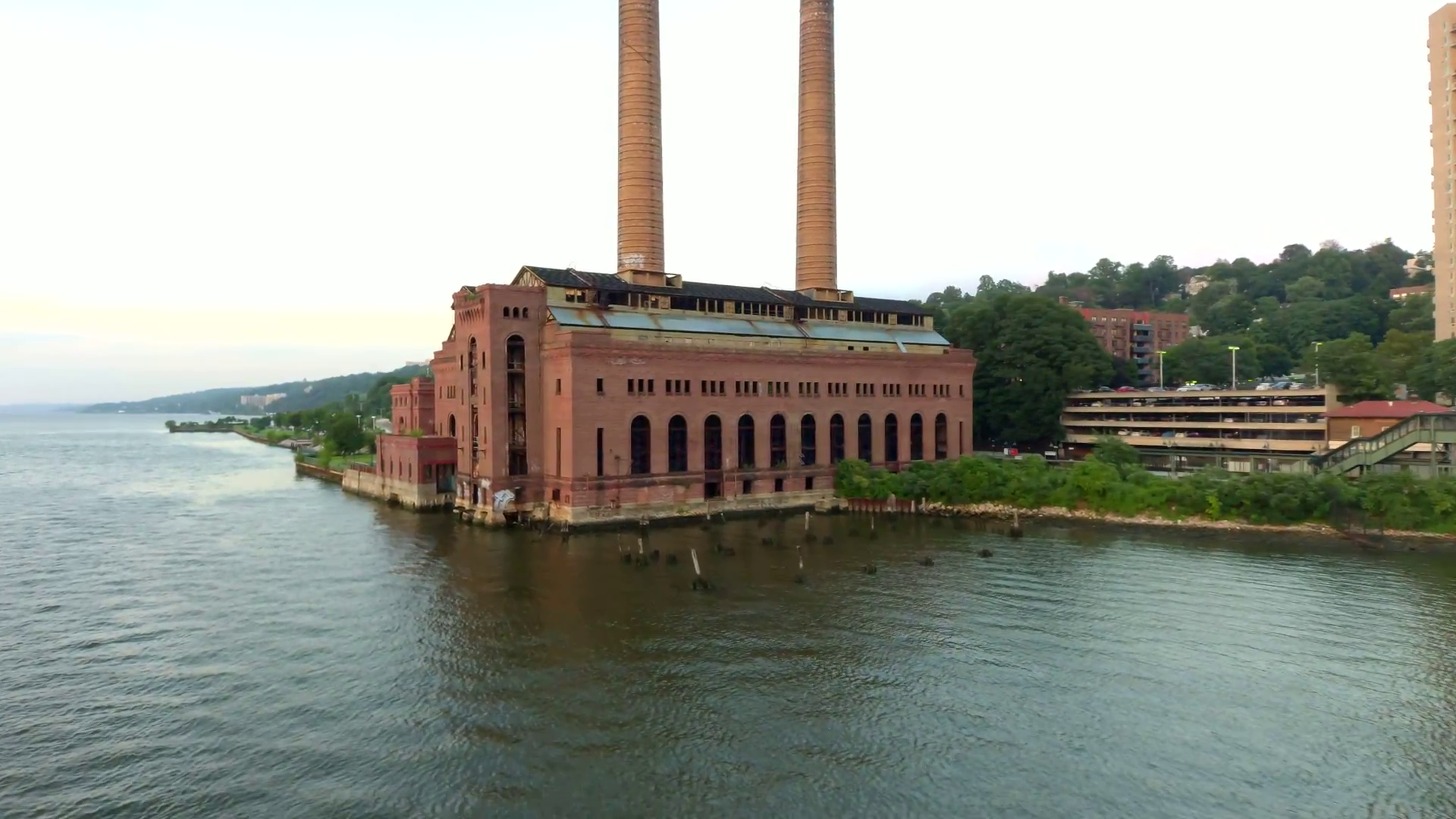
Glenwood from the southwest

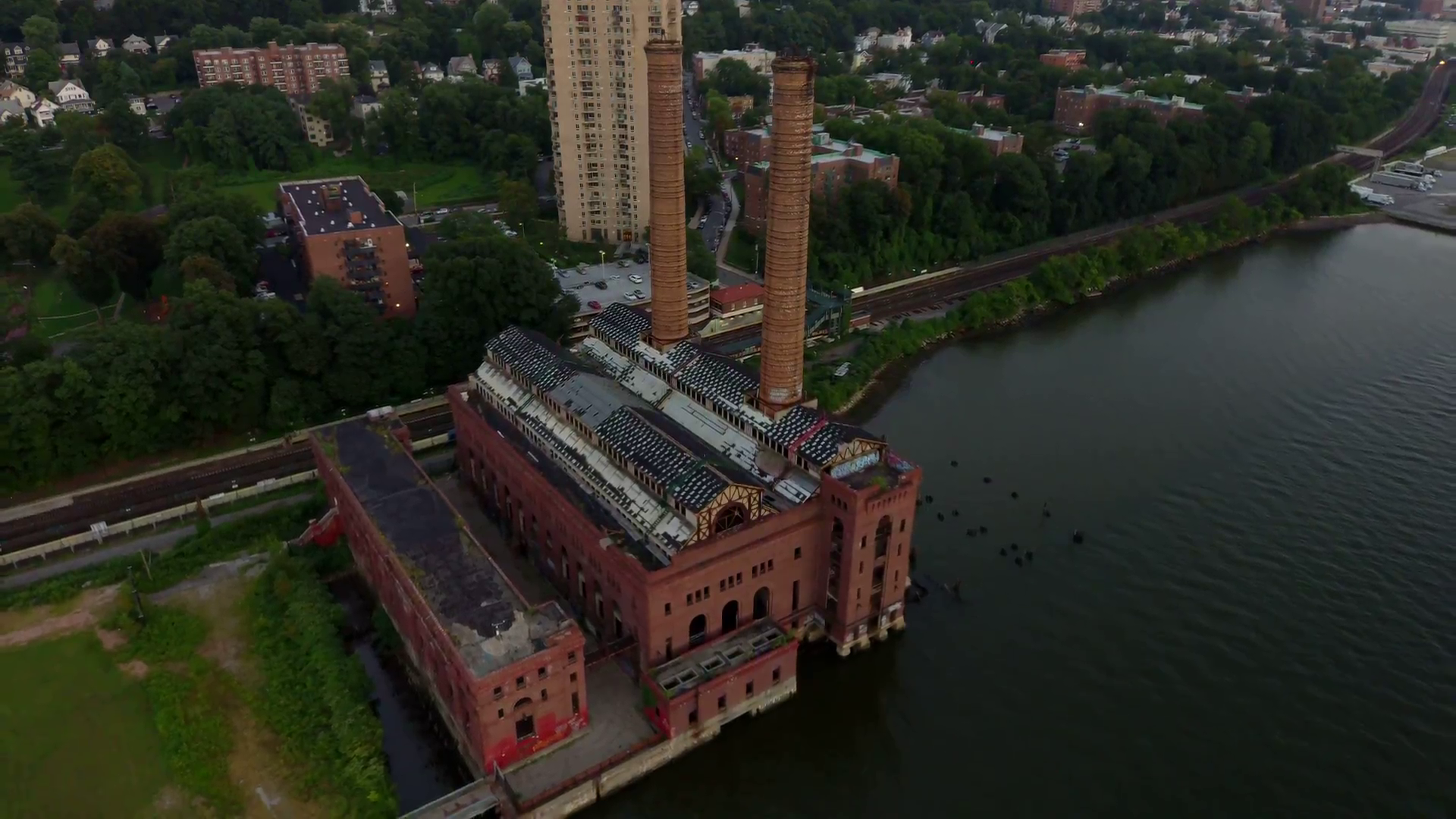
Glenwood from the northwest
