= Raffaele Menconi =

American sculptor

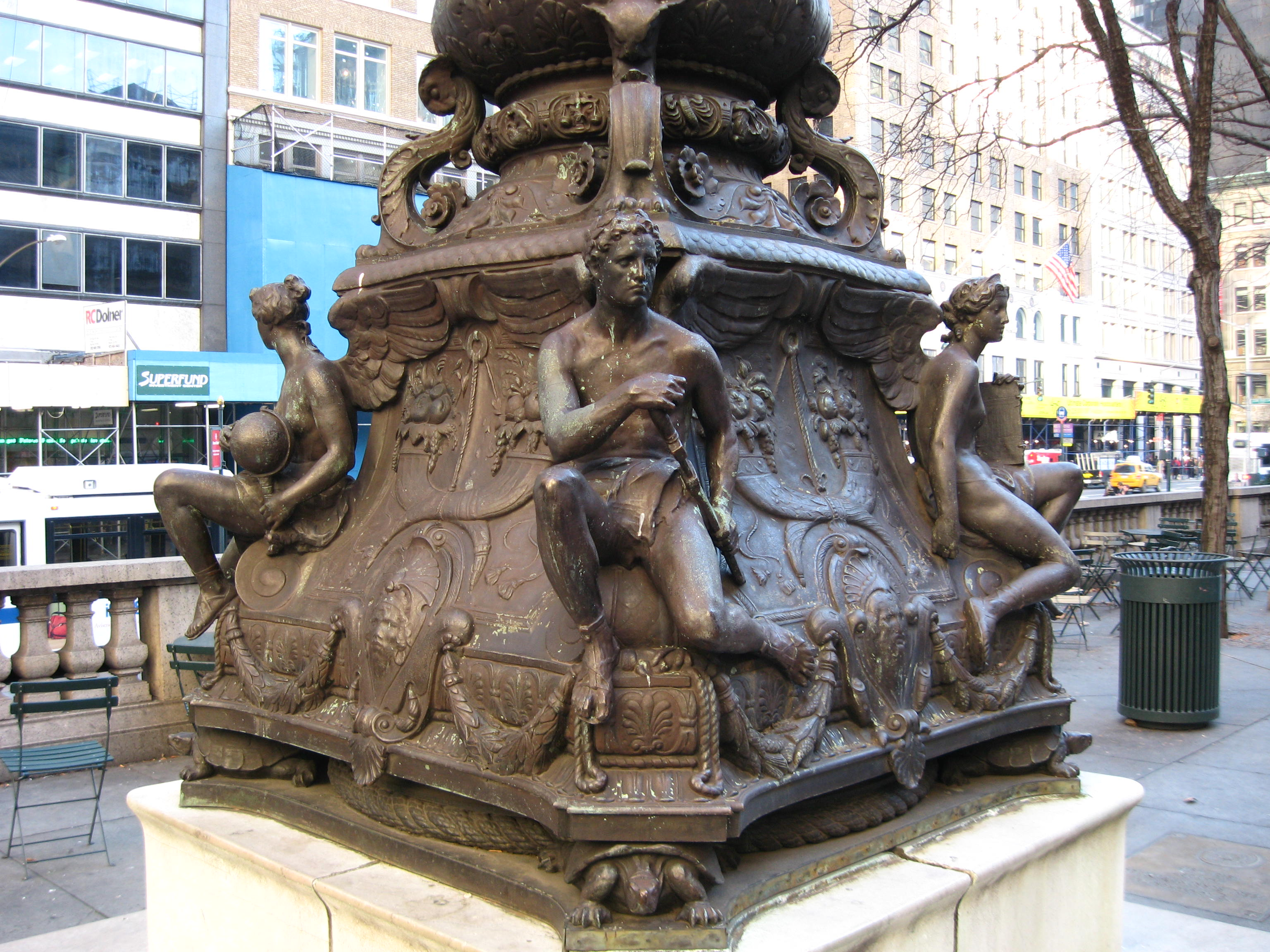
One of the pair of bronze flagpole bases, sculpted by Menconi to a sketch by Thomas Hastings (1912) and cast at Tiffany Studios, stand before the New York Public Library, Fifth Avenue, New York

Raffaele Menconi (1877 — 1942) was an Italian-American sculptor.

Raffaele Menconi was born in the town of Barga in Tuscany where he lived until he and his wife Josephine moved to the United States, first living in Union City, NJ, and later in Hastings-on-Hudson, NY.

Menconi established a practice in New York City with his brother Giuseppe (Joseph). Menconi realised the bronze architectural sculptures and fittings for a generation of Beaux-Arts architects, such as Carrère and Hastings; Menconi's bronze flagpole bases for the Fifth Avenue front of the New York Public Library (1912, illustrated) are particularly prominent. Another pair of bronze flagpole bases by Menconi, showing an American eagle and representations of the four seasons, to designs of Egerton Swartwout, stand before the Missouri State Capitol. His work also appears on the Reader's Digest building in Chappaqua New York, and in the Mount Auburn Cemetery in Cambridge, Massachusetts.

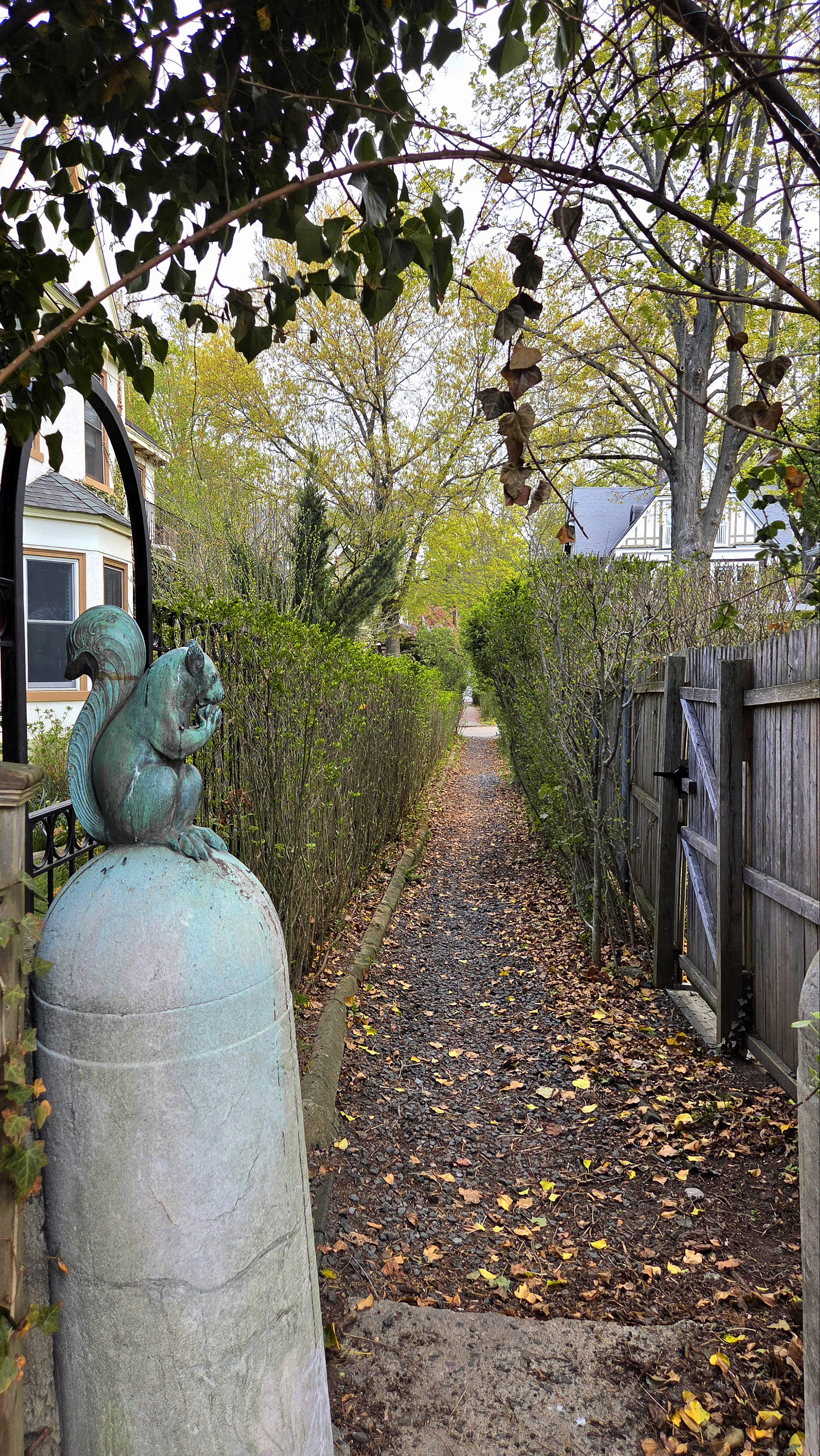
Menconi's squirrel sculpture in Hastings-on-Hudson

He married Josephine Zampieri; their son, Ralph J. Menconi (1915–1972), who apprenticed in his father's New York studio, was also a well-known sculptor and medalist.

The Menconi Family lived in an Italianate house designed by Menconi in Hastings-on-Hudson, New York, for many years. In Hastings, he designed the majestic bronze eagle on the Municipal Building and a beloved local landmark–a bronze squirrel sculpture at the entrance to the Riverview Place path, near his house. Menconi once owned a cliffside home in Union City, New Jersey.
