= William Daley (ceramist) =

American ceramist and professor (1925–2022)

- Born: March 7, 1925; Hastings-on-Hudson, New York
- Died: January 16, 2022 (aged 96); Elkins Park, Pennsylvania
- Education: Massachusetts College of Art and Design, Teachers College, Columbia University
- Employer: University of the Arts, Philadelphia
- Known for: ceramics art, professor

William Patrick Daley (March 7, 1925 – January 16, 2022) was an American ceramist and professor, known for large scale, contemporary, unglazed stoneware.

== Biography ==
Daley was born on March 7, 1925, in Hastings-on-Hudson, New York. He attended Massachusetts College of Art and Design and graduated with a bachelor's degree in 1950, and Teachers College, Columbia University and graduated with a degree in 1952. He initially taught at state schools in Iowa and New York. Daley taught ceramics from 1957 until 1990 at University of the Arts, Philadelphia.

He received a gold medal in 2003 from the American Craft Council.

Daley’s work is in various public collections including at the Metropolitan Museum of Art, Museum of Art and Design, Museum of Fine Arts, Houston, Philadelphia Museum of Art, among others.

He died in Elkins Park, Pennsylvania, on January 16, 2022, at the age of 96.

== See also ==
- Craft in America
