= Jan Owen (artist) =

American book artist

Jan Owen (born 1947) is an American book artist.

She was born in New York City and grew up in Hastings-on-Hudson, New York. Owen received a BA in art and English from DePauw University in 1969. She went on to study calligraphy and book arts in the United States and Great Britain. Owen moved to Bangor, Maine and played string bass with the Bangor Symphony Orchestra until 1994.

Her work is included in the collections of the Library of Congress, the National Museum of Women in the Arts and many universities as well as private collections.

== See also ==
Jan Owen - Pandemic Book of Days - Video on Vimeo (1m55s)
