= Hastings-on-Hudson, New York =

- Village
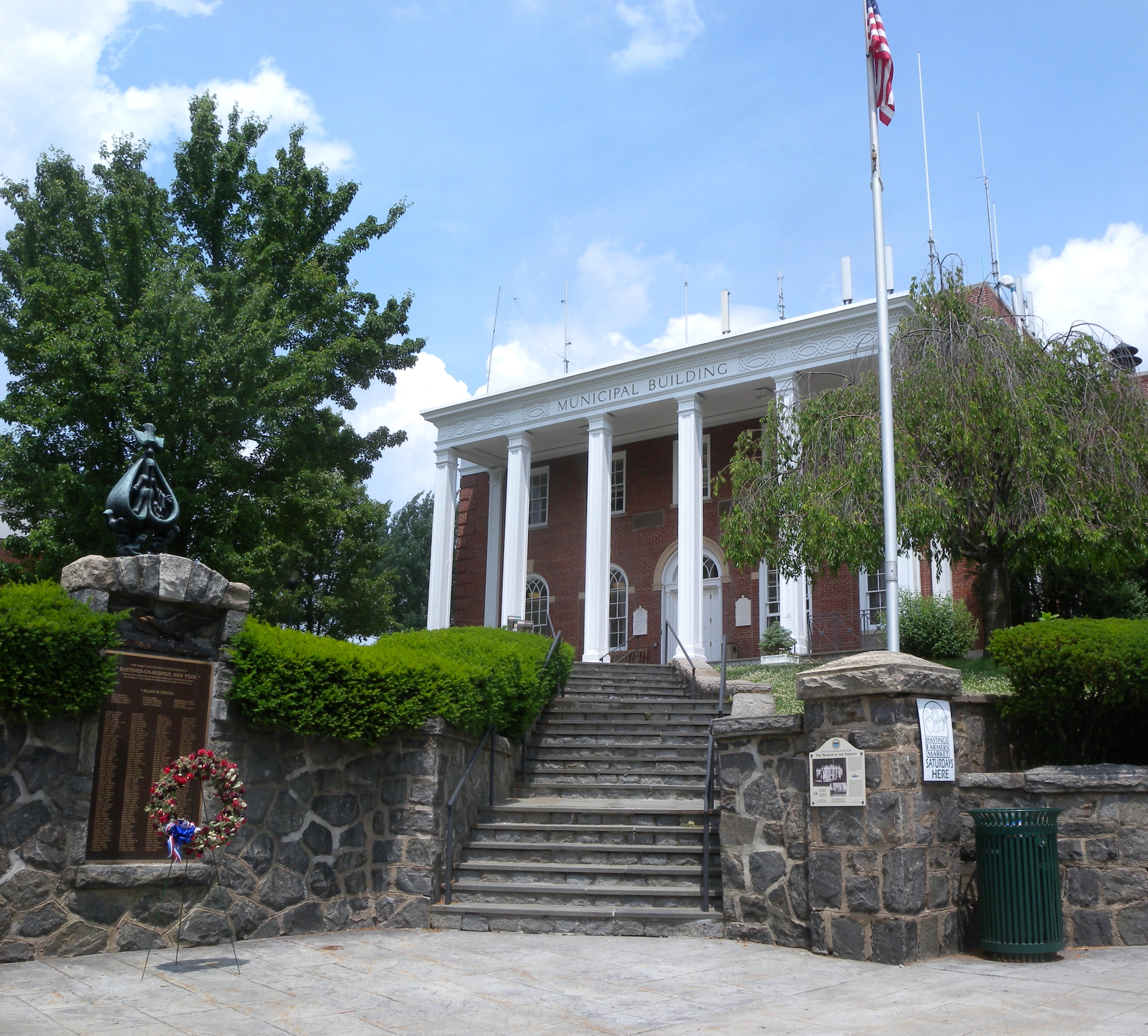
- Municipal building

- Seal

- Location of Hastings-on-Hudson, New York
- Coordinates: 40°59′28″N 73°52′27″W
- Country: United States
- State: New York
- County: Westchester
- Town: Greenburgh

Area
  - Total: 2.92 sq mi (7.56 km^{2})
  - Land: 1.98 sq mi (5.13 km^{2})
  - Water: 0.94 sq mi (2.43 km^{2})

Population (2020)
  - Total: 8,590
  - Density: 4,341/sq mi (1,675.9/km^{2})
- Time zone: UTC-5 (Eastern (EST))
  - Summer (DST): UTC-4 (EDT)
- ZIP codes: 10706
- Area code: 914
- FIPS code: 36-32710
- Website: hohny.gov

Hastings-on-Hudson is a village in Westchester County located in the southwestern part of the town of Greenburgh in the state of New York, United States. It is a suburb of New York City, located approximately 20 miles (32 km) north of midtown Manhattan, and is served by a stop on the Metro-North Hudson Line. To the north of Hastings-on-Hudson is the village of Dobbs Ferry, to the south, the city of Yonkers, and to the east unincorporated parts of Greenburgh. As of the 2020 US Census, it had a population of 8,590. The town lies on U.S. Route 9, "Broadway" and the Saw Mill River Parkway.

== History ==
The area that is now Hastings-on-Hudson and Dobbs Ferry was the primary settlement of the Weckquaesgeek Algonquian people, who called the community Wysquaqua. In the summer, the Weckquaesgeeks camped at the mouth of the ravine running under the present Warburton Avenue Bridge. There they fished, swam and collected oysters and clamshells used to make wampum. On the level plain nearby (which is now Maple Avenue), they planted corn and possibly tobacco.

The findings of large numbers of artifacts have suggested that there was significant tribal activity in the confluence of Factory Brook and Scheckler's Brook just behind what is now the Cropsey Studio, but the interest in the site failed to generate any archeological inquiry.

=== Early history ===
During the colonial times, the area was part of the extensive Philipsburg Manor, which included what is now Hastings-on-Hudson. After dividing the area into four nearly equal-sized farms, Frederick Philipse, the first lord of the manor, and his heirs leased the farmland to Dutch, English, and French Huguenot settlers.

During the American Revolution, what is now Hastings-on-Hudson lay between the lines of the warring forces in the so-called Neutral Ground. In reality, the area became a no-man's land and was raided repeatedly by both sides. One of the Philipses' tenant farmers, Peter Post, played a role in a Revolutionary War skirmish known as the Battle of Edgar's Lane that was fought in a ravine in the vicinity of his house. The skirmish was a notable, albeit small-scale, American victory.

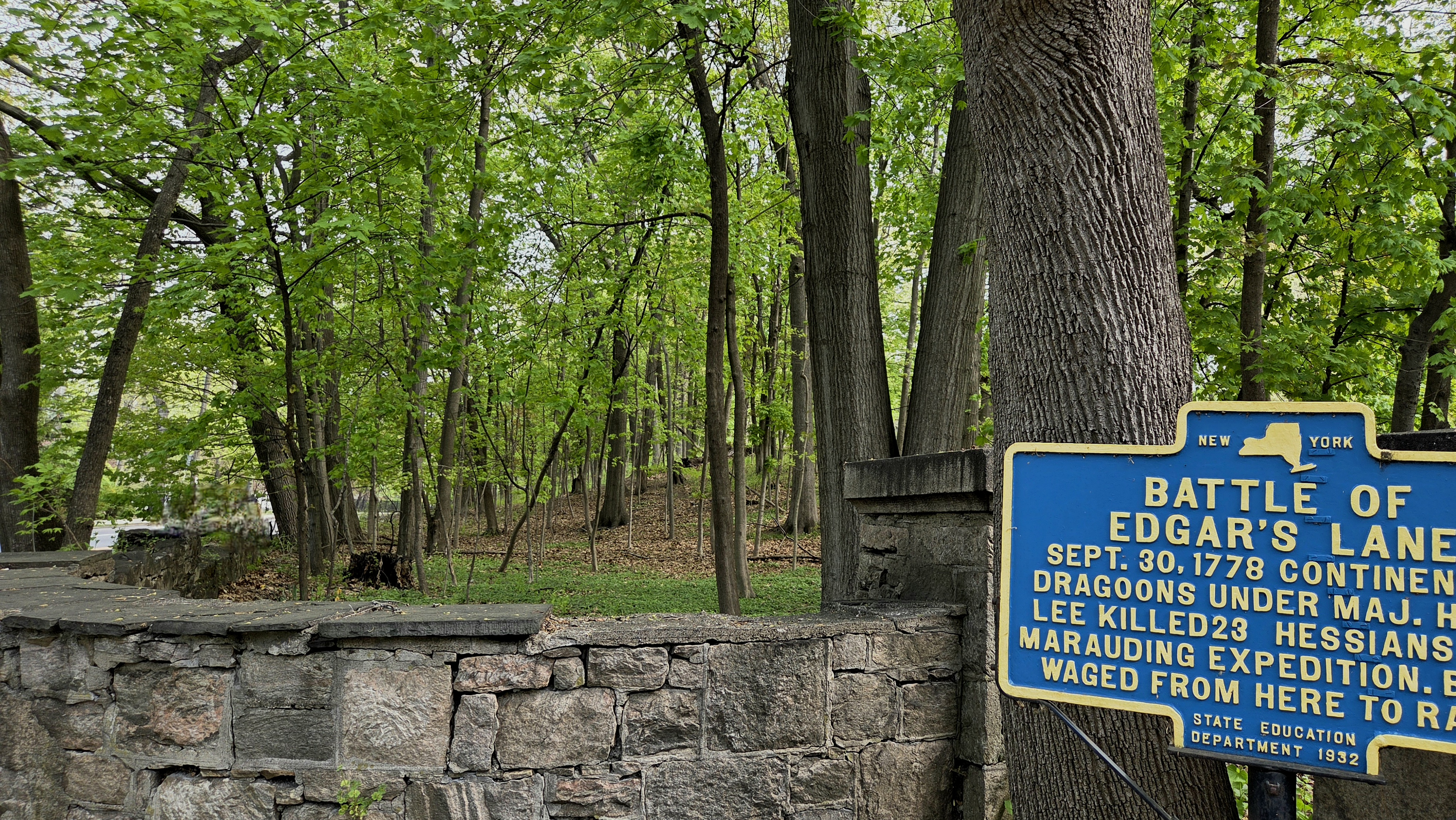
Battle of Edgar's Lane site

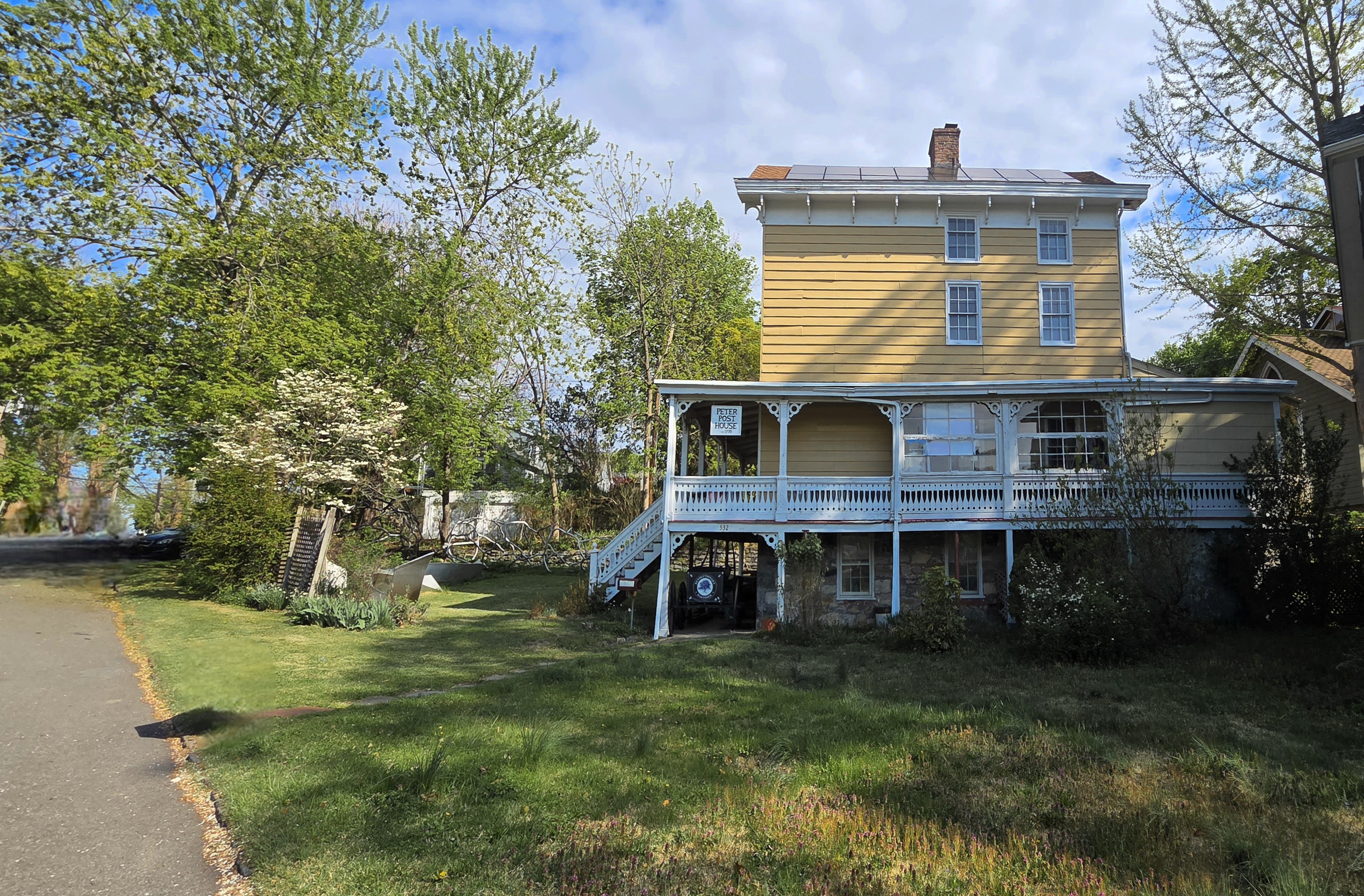
Post-Baker House

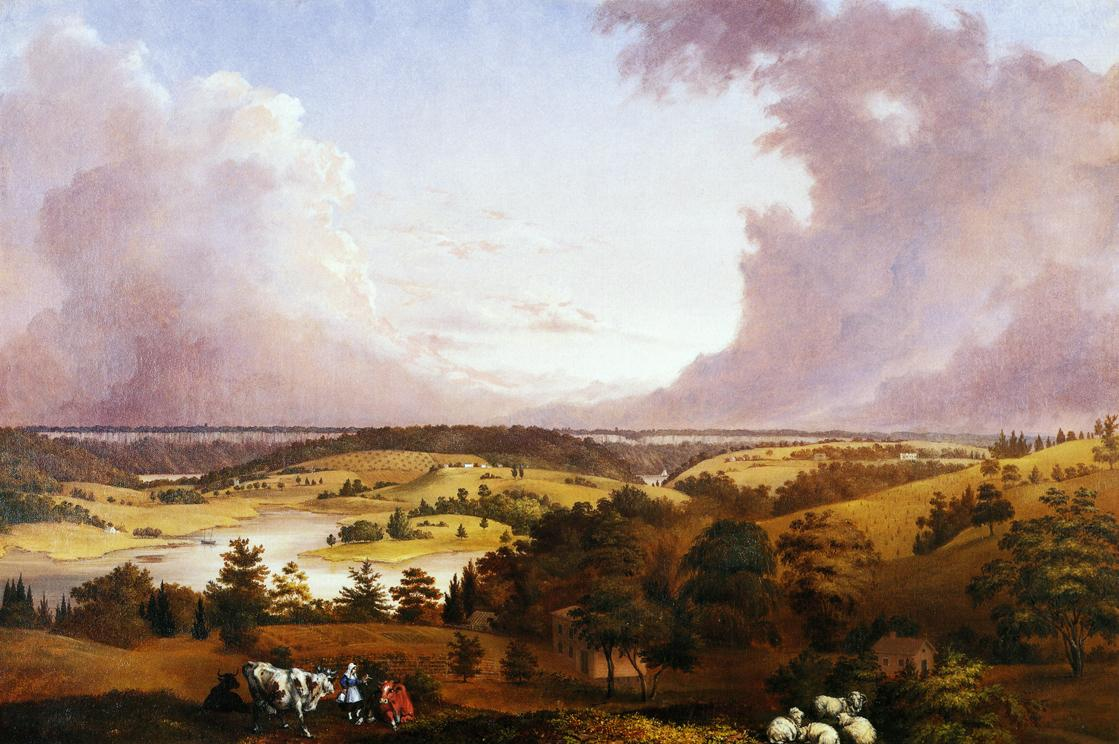
View of Hastings-on-Hudson, oil on canvas, John Ludlow Martin, 1856

Following the Revolution, the Philipses, who were staunch Loyalists, saw their vast lands confiscated and sold (mostly to the Philipses' former tenant farmers) by the newly established American state. In 1785, the four farms comprising today's Hastings-on-Hudson were bought by James DeClark, Jacobus Dyckman, George Fisher, and the above-mentioned Peter Post, who opened a tavern at his house. Post's land would become the center of the village of Hastings. (His house still stands. Known as the Post-Baker House, the building is a private residence marked by a historical sign.)

Around the same time, Westchester County, which had been established as one of the 10 original counties in New York, was divided into towns, and the area that is now Hastings-on-Hudson became part of the town of Greenburgh. The village was incorporated in 1879 and its name changed from Hastings-Upon-Hudson to Hastings-on-Hudson.

Before and during the American Civil War, the Underground Railroad ran through Westchester County, with vital stops in Hastings-on-Hudson and Tarrytown.

=== Industrial heyday ===
Stone quarrying was the earliest industry in Hastings-on-Hudson. From 1865 to 1871, hundreds of Scottish and Irish laborers blasted huge quantities of dolomitic marble from a white Westchester marble quarry. An inclined railroad carried the marble down to the quarry wharf where it was dressed by skilled stonecutters and loaded onto ships bound for cities like New York and Charleston, South Carolina.

By the 1880s, Hastings Pavement was producing hexagonal paving blocks which were used extensively in Central Park and Prospect Park in Brooklyn. Between 1895 and 1900, Hastings Pavement produced 10 million such blocks and shipped them throughout the United States and to cities in Canada, Brazil and England. By 1891, the National Conduit and Cable Company had established an operation on the waterfront producing cables for utility companies here and abroad. In 1912, labor strife between striking workers and their employer, the National Cable and Conduit Company, left two striking workers and two bystanders dead. Similar labor unrest occurred in 1916, whereby the Village was put under house arrest.

During World War I, 200 National Guardsmen were stationed in Hastings-on-Hudson because of the security interests of the National Conduit plant and a chemical plant opened by Frederick G. Zinsser that produced a wood alcohol called Hastings Spirits.

The plant was important because in 1915 it took orders from the UK to produce .303 ammunition, but they could not pump up the production, so the contracts were cancelled in late 1916. In 1917, it produced .30-06 ammo for the US Navy and Army.

While the industry grew on the waterfront, affluent professionals and artists from New York City were buying former tenant farms and developing estates on the Hastings hillsides; the village became a fashionable summer retreat.

=== 1920s to the present ===
The Anaconda Copper Company took over National Conduit in 1929, and a few years later acquired the Hastings Pavement property. By the end of World War II, Anaconda owned most of the industrial waterfront. Anaconda closed its Hastings-on-Hudson plant in 1975, bringing to an end the century-long era of heavy industry on the Hastings-on-Hudson waterfront.

The Hillside-on-Hastings sanitarium and hospital opened in 1926. It was a pioneering facility aimed at treating "borderline" cases to prevent serious mental conditions. In the late 1930s, the hospital attempted to expand at its Hastings location, but the village denied the request due to changing zoning laws. This led the hospital to relocate to its current site in Glen Oaks, Queens, in 1941, where it became a national leader in mental healthcare.

Billie Burke, actress (the "Good Witch" in The Wizard of Oz), lived in Hastings-on-Hudson and left her property to the school district, which still owns it, and uses it for various sports.

Benjamin Franklin Goodrich, from Ripley, in western New York, used real estate profits to purchase the Hudson River Rubber Company, a small business in Hastings-on-Hudson. The following year, Goodrich relocated the business to Akron, Ohio.

Children's Village, a boarding facility for children in difficult circumstances, located in neighboring Dobbs Ferry, sold about 50 acres (200,000 m^{2}) of its property in Hastings-on-Hudson to a developer in 1986. The developer was planning to build close to 100 homes that would result in traffic on the roads adjoining Hillside Elementary School. Local residents formed a committee called "Save Hillside Woods" and raised close to $800K. As a result of the 1987 stock market crash and the subsequent receivership of the bank that held the mortgage on the property, the Village purchased this parcel from the FDIC with the funds accumulated and a bond floated by the Village of Hastings-on-Hudson to expand and maintain Hillside Woods.

The Jasper F. Cropsey House and Studio and Hastings Prototype House are listed on the National Register of Historic Places. The John William Draper House is listed as a National Historic Landmark

== Geography ==
Hastings-on-Hudson is located at 40°59′28″N 73°52′27″W (40.991102, -73.874114) in an area of hills on the Hudson River opposite the Palisades cliffs, north of the city of Yonkers. The Village is bordered by the Hudson River to the west, and the Saw Mill River to the east. The areas facing the Hudson River have views of the Palisades to the west, Manhattan to the south and the Mario Cuomo Bridge to the north.

According to the United States Census Bureau, the Village has a total area of 2.9 square miles (7.5 km^{2}), of which 2.0 square miles (5.2 km^{2}) is land and 0.9 square miles (2.3 km^{2}), or 32.65%, is water.

Several small tributaries and headwaters of the Hudson River are located in the village, including Scheckler's Brook which originates in Hillside Woods and Factory Brook which begins in a spring in the southern end of the Burke Estate, these merge behind the Cropsey Studio west of the Aqueduct Trail.

=== Transportation ===
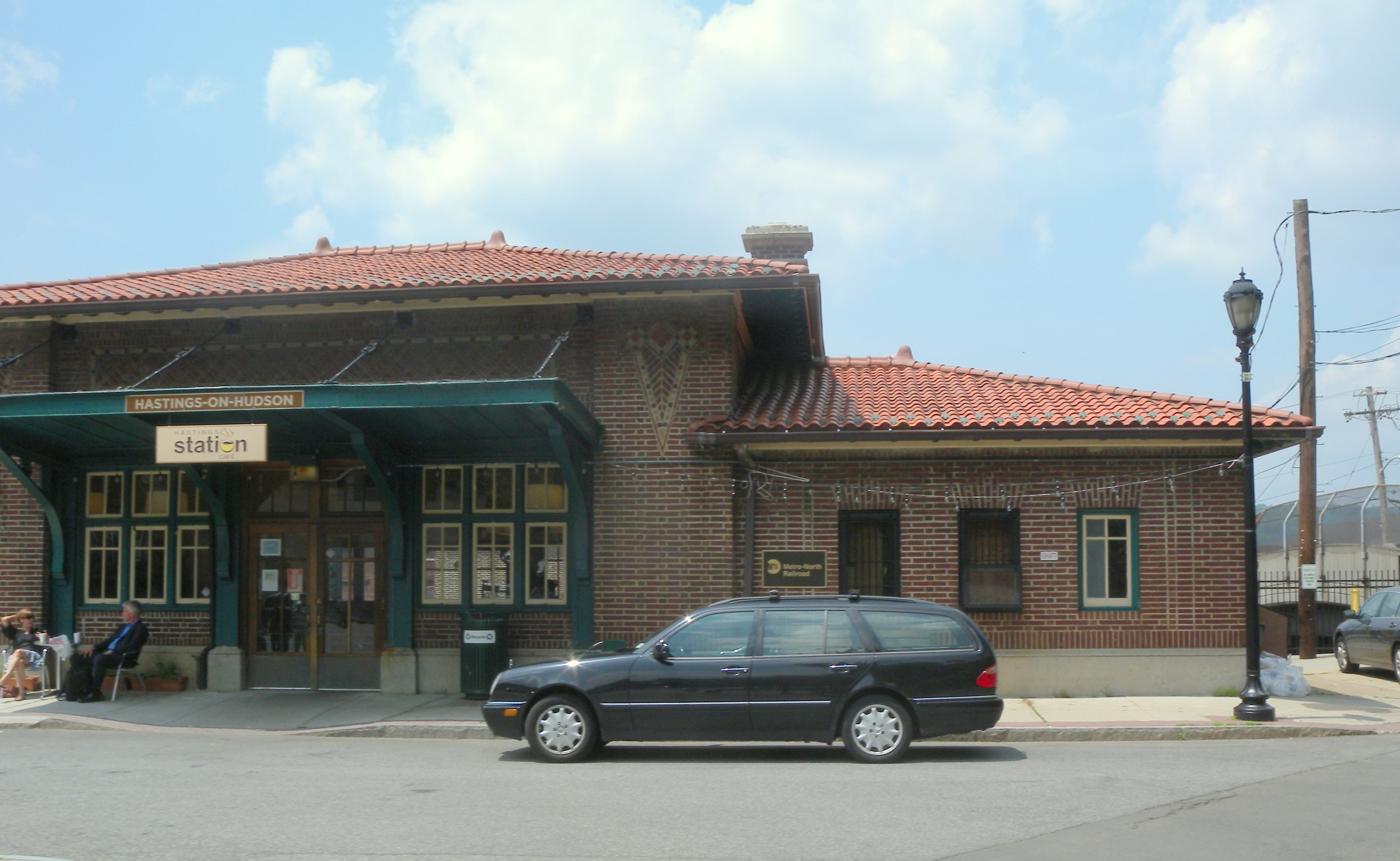
The former Hastings-on-Hudson train station facing West, c. 2010

Although a suburb of New York City, Hastings-on-Hudson enjoys better mass transit service than many other suburbs in the United States. Commuter rail service is available via the Hastings-on-Hudson railway station, served by the Metro-North Railroad's Hudson Line to Grand Central Terminal, Croton-on-Hudson and Poughkeepsie; transfers to Amtrak's Empire Corridor are available three stops south, at the Yonkers railway station. Additionally, several bus routes operated by the Bee-Line Bus System, connect Hastings-on-Hudson with other places in Westchester and northern sections of the Bronx.

The Saw Mill River Parkway has exits in Hastings-on Hudson - Northbound at Exit 12 at Farragut Parkway and Exit 13 at Farragut Avenue, and Southbound Exit 14 at Clarence Avenue and Exit 15 at Cliff Street. US Route 9 runs through the Village, as Broadway.

== Demographics ==
Historical population
Census	Pop.	Note	%±
1880	1,290		—
1890	1,466		13.6%
1900	2,002		36.6%
1910	4,552		127.4%
1920	5,526		21.4%
1930	7,097		28.4%
1940	7,057		−0.6%
1950	7,565		7.2%
1960	8,979		18.7%
1970	9,479		5.6%
1980	8,573		−9.6%
1990	8,000		−6.7%
2000	7,648		−4.4%
2010	7,849		2.6%
2020	8,590		9.4%
U.S. Decennial Census

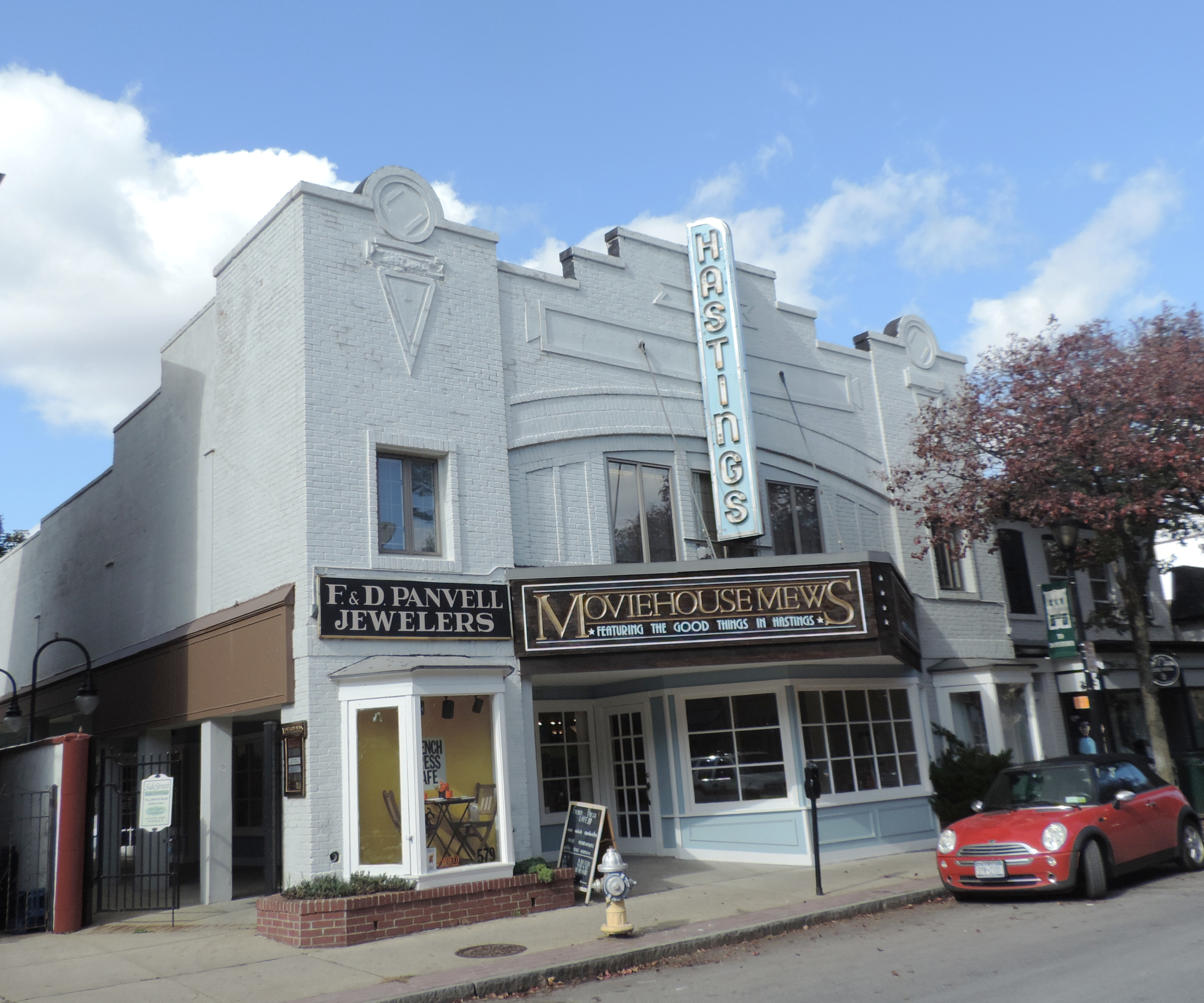
Downtown shops in a former movie house

=== 2020 census ===
As of the 2020 census, Hastings-on-Hudson had a population of 8,590. The median age was 44.8 years. 24.4% of residents were under the age of 18 and 19.5% of residents were 65 years of age or older. For every 100 females there were 90.8 males, and for every 100 females age 18 and over there were 86.3 males age 18 and over.

100.0% of residents lived in urban areas, while 0.0% lived in rural areas.

There were 3,121 households in Hastings-on-Hudson, of which 37.1% had children under the age of 18 living in them. Of all households, 59.7% were married-couple households, 11.9% were households with a male householder and no spouse or partner present, and 23.9% were households with a female householder and no spouse or partner present. About 22.9% of all households were made up of individuals and 11.1% had someone living alone who was 65 years of age or older.

There were 3,298 housing units, of which 3,121 were occupied and 177 were vacant (94.6% occupied and 5.4% vacant). The homeowner vacancy rate was 0.6% and the rental vacancy rate was 5.3%.

Racial composition as of the 2020 census
Race	Number	Percent
White	6,577	76.6%
Black or African American	256	3.0%
American Indian and Alaska Native	13	0.2%
Asian	502	5.8%
Native Hawaiian and Other Pacific Islander	1	0.0%
Some other race	332	3.9%
Two or more races	909	10.6%
Hispanic or Latino (of any race)	971	11.3%

=== Income and poverty ===
As of the census of 2020, the median income for a household in the Village was $139,879. The per capita income for the Village was $79,190. About 2.9% of families and 2.5% of the population were below the poverty line.

=== 2000 census ===
As of the census of 2000, there were 3,093 households, out of which 33.8% had children under the age of 18 living with them, 57.0% were married couples living together, 8.3% had a female householder with no husband present, and 32.4% were non-families. 27.5% of all households were made up of individuals, and 11.3% had someone living alone who was 65 years of age or older. The average household size was 2.47 and the average family size was 3.05.

In the Village, as of the census of 2000, the population was spread out, with 25.0% under the age of 18, 4.1% from 18 to 24, 26.1% from 25 to 44, 29.3% from 45 to 64, and 15.5% who were 65 years of age or older. The median age was 42 years. For every 100 females, there were 91.6 males. For every 100 females age 18 and over, there were 85.9 males.

As of the census of 2000, the median income for a household in the Village was $83,188, and the median income for a family was $129,227. Males had a median income of $76,789 versus $50,702 for females. The per capita income for the Village was $48,914. About 1.5% of families and 3.5% of the population were below the poverty line, including 2.7% of those under age 18 and 1.9% of those age 65 or over.

In 2013, the infusion of urban professionals from New York City resulted in characterization of the town as an example of "hipsturbia", a neologism coined by The New York Times to describe the hip lifestyle as lived in suburbia by "hipsters". However, this article has been the subject of much controversy both within and with-out the community, with The New York Observer publishing one particularly scathing commentary.

== Education ==
It is in the Hastings-on-Hudson Union Free School District. Hastings-on-Hudson has three public schools, in the Hastings Union Free School District: Hillside Elementary School, Farragut Middle School, and Hastings High School. All three have been awarded the National Blue Ribbon Award.

Greenburgh-Graham Union Free School District is of a special education school facility in Hastings.

== Government ==
Hastings-on-Hudson is one of six incorporated villages that lie within the town of Greenburgh. The village is governed by a mayor, who is elected every two years in odd-numbered years, and four trustees, who also serve two-year terms. Two of the trustees are elected in even-numbered years, with the mayor and the other two in odd-numbered years. A paid village manager is responsible for the day-to-day operations of the village. The current mayor is Tom Drake.

== Attractions and recreation ==
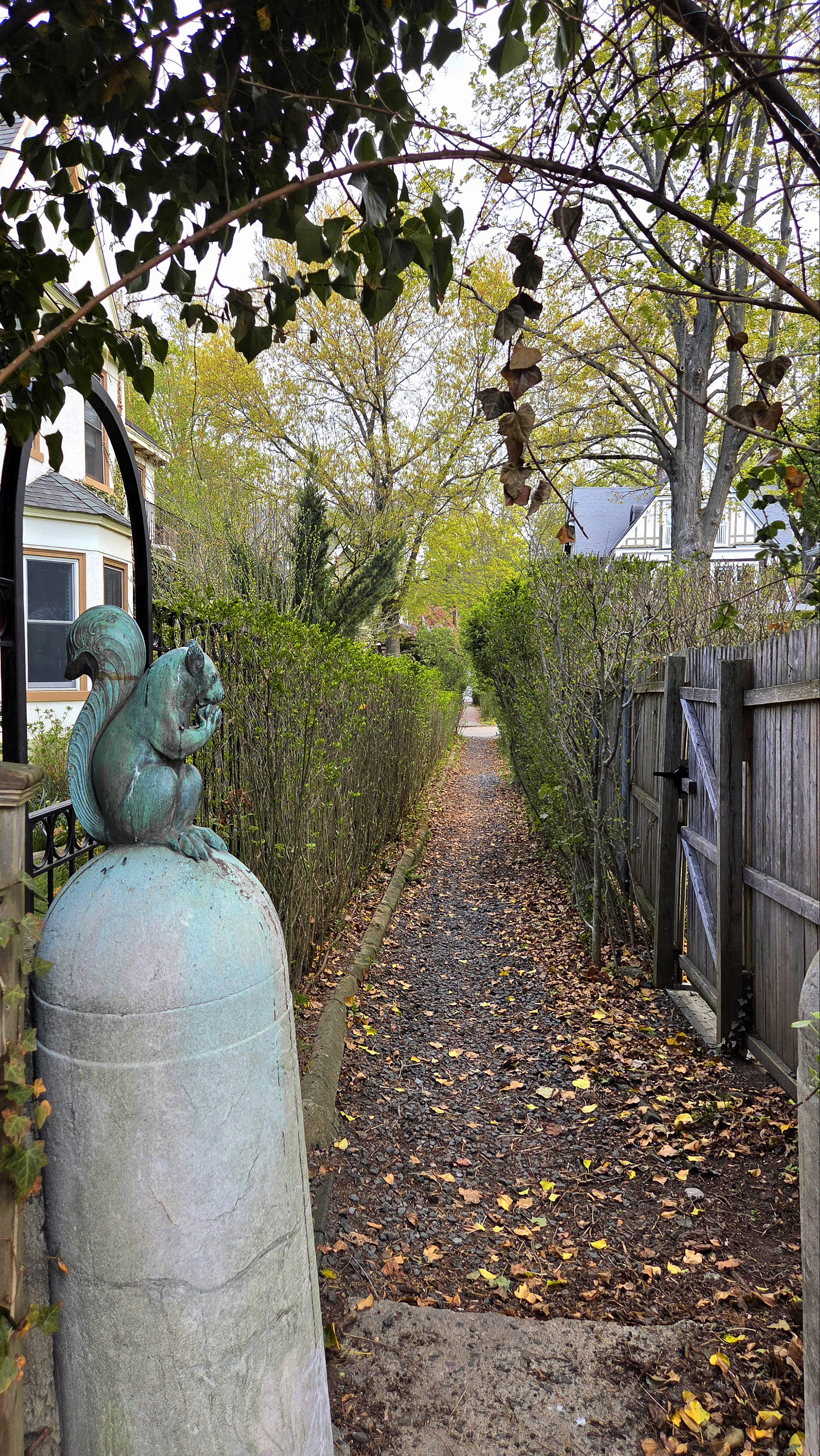
Bronze squirrel sculpture by Raffaele Menconi at the Riverview Place path, a local landmark

In 2018 Brooke Lea Foster of The New York Times stated that it was one of several "Rivertowns" in New York State, which she described as among the "least suburban of suburbs, each one celebrated by buyers there for its culture and hip factor, as much as the housing stock and sophisticated post-city life." Of those, Foster stated that Irvington was the "artsiest".

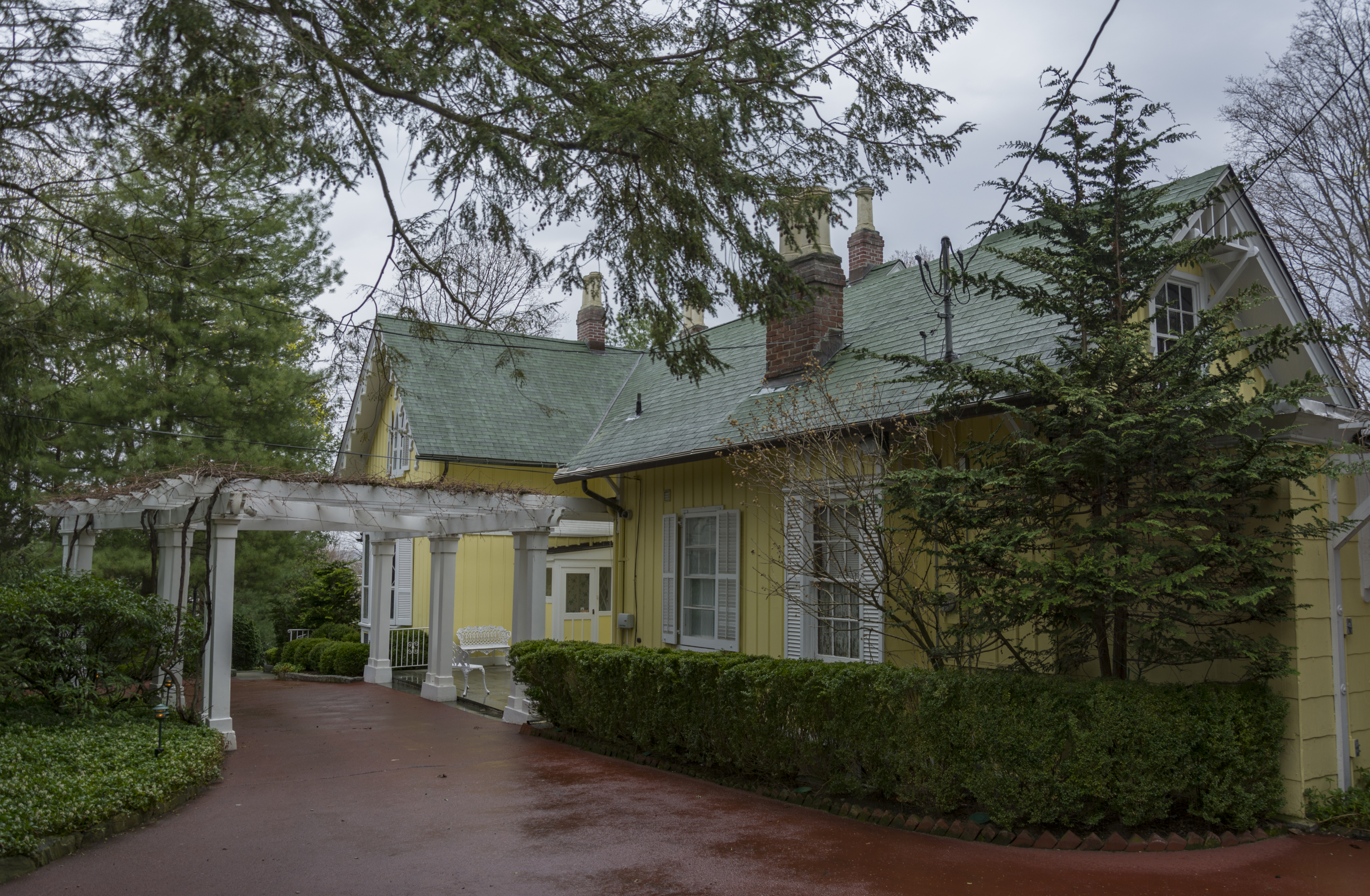
Jasper Cropsey's home and studio Ever Rest

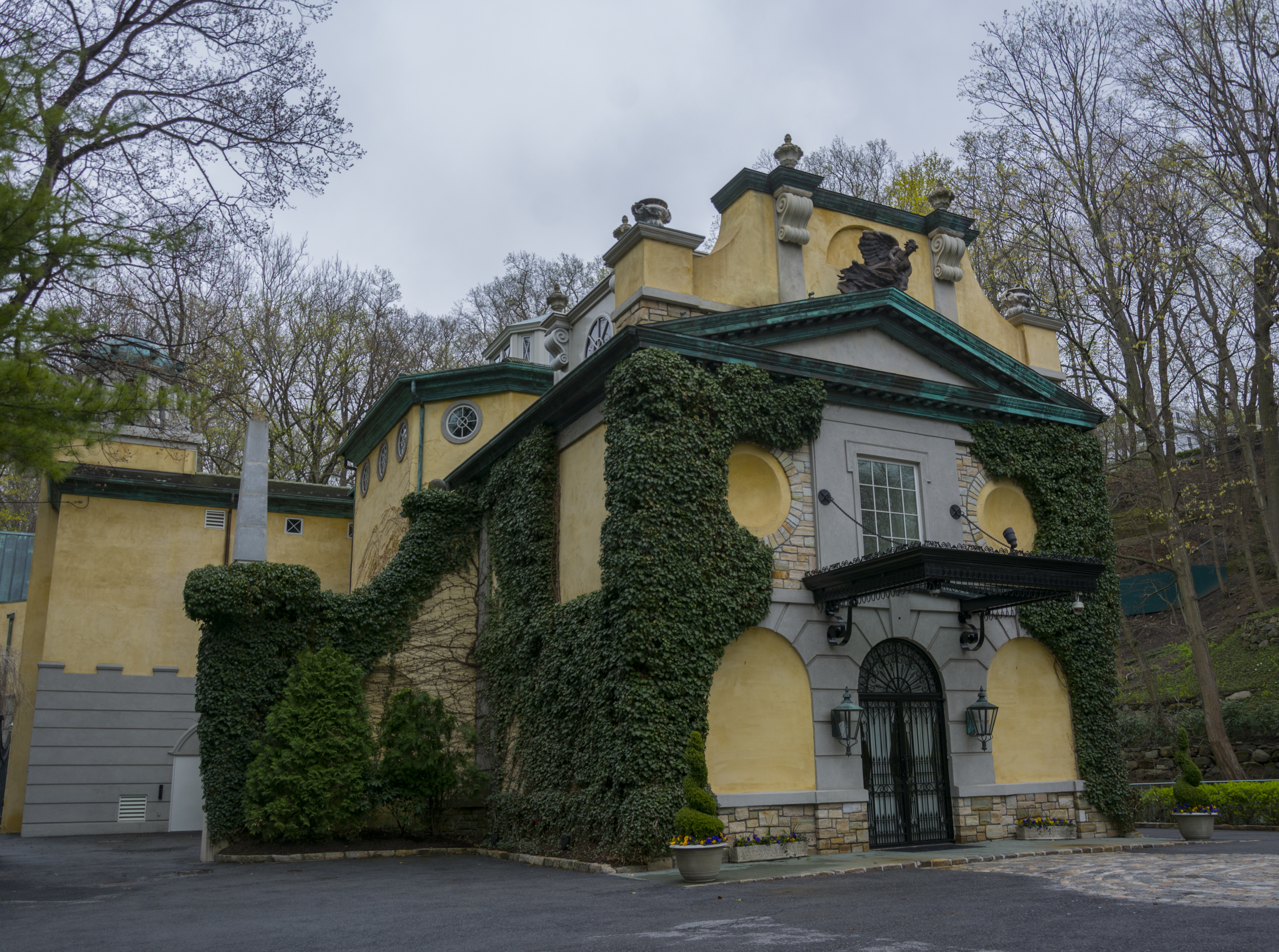
The Newington-Cropsey Foundation's Gallery of Art, a museum of Cropsey's works

Attractions and places for recreation include:

- Chemka Pool, a community outdoor swimming pool near the Hillside Woods/School
- Hillside Woods, a large wooded area with hiking trails
- Two north-south linear parks: the Old Croton Aqueduct Trailway state park, and the South County Trailway county park
- Sugar Pond, a small pond located in the Riverview Manor portion of the Hillside Woods; open to ice skating in the winter
- Quarry Park, a park off the Croton Aqueduct commemorating site of 19th century quarry
- Numerous playing fields including the Burke Estate, Zinsser Park, Reynolds Field, and Uniontown Field
- Downtown Hastings-on-Hudson, with retail stores and restaurants
- Ever Rest, the homestead and studio of painter Jasper Cropsey (1823–1900), listed on the National Register of Historic Places in New York.
- A public library
- A farmer's market on Saturdays (outdoors June–November; indoors twice monthly December–May)
- The VFW building with a dance studio and karate school
- Hastings High School, which presents theatre productions and other shows
- "Museum of the Streets", a walking tour with historic markers maintained by the Hastings Historical Society.
- A new free outdoor Concert Series was launched at MacEachron Waterfront Park in 2018.
- The River Spirit Music and Arts Festival, the Village's annual event, at Draper Park, on the second Saturday of September.

== Notable people ==
- Steve Addabbo, Grammy winner
- Marco Arment, creator of Instapaper and co-founder of Tumblr
- Edoardo Ballerini, actor, audiobook narrator
- Helen Barolini, author
- Michael Brecker, jazz saxophonist and composer
- Louis E. Brus, American chemist and recipient of several awards including Franklin Institute's Bower Award, Kavli Prize in nanoscience, and 2023 Nobel Prize in Chemistry
- Billie Burke, actress best known for playing the Good Witch of the North in The Wizard of Oz
- Daniel Callahan, medical ethicist, co-founder, Hastings Center
- Kenneth B. Clark and Mamie Phipps Clark, influential civil rights pioneers and psychologist
- Stephen Collins, actor
- Jasper Francis Cropsey, painter
- William Daley, ceramist, professor
- Albert Dekker, actor
- Crescent Dragonwagon, novelist, children's book writer, cookbook author; daughter of Maurice Zolotow and Charlotte Zolotow
- Daniel Draper, meteorologist
- Dorothy Catherine Draper, educator and chemist
- Henry Draper, astronomer and author; first to discover that oxygen is present in the sun
- John W. Draper, first president of American Chemical Society between 1876 and 1877
- Adrian Ettlinger, inventor and engineer
- Michael Ettlinger, policy and political advisor, educator
- David Farragut, American Civil War Union Navy admiral
- Martin Gardner, author of the "Mathematical Games" column in Scientific American
- Giuseppe Garibaldi, key figure in Italian unification
- Marcia Mitzman Gaven, actress and Tony Award nominee 1993
- Willard Gaylin, co-founder, Hastings Center, psychiatrist and medical ethicist
- Seth Godin, entrepreneur, author and public speaker
- Benjamin Franklin Goodrich, founder of Goodrich Corporation
- Dan Greenburg, author, essayist, playwright
- Zack O'Malley Greenburg, author and former child actor
- Harry Hillman, 1904 Olympic gold medalist in the 400m, 200mH, & 400mH. Silver medalist in 1908 in the 400mH.
- Lewis Hine, photographer
- Jack Houghteling, novelist
- Roger Howarth, actor, One Life to Live
- James Howe, children's book author, author of Bunnicula and The Misfits, among many other books
- James Kaplan, author of Two Guys from Verona, Dean and Me: A Love Story, Frank: The Voice, and other books
- Ricki Lake, actress and television talk show host
- John Lavachielli, actor
- Tom Lecky, antiquarian bookseller, musician, artist
- David Leonhardt, Pulitzer Prize-winning columnist for The New York Times
- Barron H. Lerner, internist, medical historian and ethicist, professor of medicine, author of The Good Doctor, When Illness Goes Public, and other books
- Jacques Lipchitz, sculptor
- Steven Lysak, 1948 Olympic gold medalist in canoeing
- Ali Marpet, American football player in the NFL
- George Frederick Matthew (1837–1923), Canadian botanist and geologist
- Antonia Maury, astronomer
- Abel Meeropol, writer; under his pseudonym Lewis Allan wrote the anti-lynching poem "Strange Fruit"
- Robert Meeropol, son of Ethel and Julius Rosenberg, who were executed for conspiracy to commit espionage
- Raffaele Menconi, sculptor
- Robert C. Merton, 1997 winner of the Nobel Memorial Prize in Economics
- Robert K. Merton, sociologist and creator of popular concepts including "self-fulfilling prophecy", "role model", "unintended consequences", and "anomie"
- Frank Morgan, character actor, title character in the film The Wizard of Oz
- George Newall, co-creator, composer, executive producer for the children's educational television series, School House Rock
- Adolph S. Ochs, The New York Times and Chattanooga Times publisher
- Keith Olbermann, news anchor, liberal commentator and radio sportscaster
- Jan Owen, book artist
- John Patitucci, jazz bass player, specializing in post-bop, jazz fusion and Brazilian jazz
- Edmund Phelps, Columbia University professor and winner of the Nobel Memorial Prize in Economics
- Leo James Rainwater, Nobel Prize-winning physicist
- Molly Ringwald, actress
- John Riordan, Bell Labs mathematician
- Coco Rocha, model
- J.T. Rogers, playwright
- Margaret Sanger, founder of the American Birth Control League
- John Saunders, ESPN
- Alan Schneider, Broadway director
- Cathy Seibel, United States federal judge for the U.S. District Court for the Southern District of New York, appointed in 2008.
- William Shatner, actor
- Richmond Shreve, architect, Empire State Building
- Charles Siebert, actor/director
- Jerry Silverman, guitarist, folk singer, teacher, publisher guitar music books
- Gary Smulyan, jazz baritone saxophonist
- André Leon Talley, editor-at-large of American Vogue
- Max Theiler, Nobel Prize laureate
- John Bartholomew Tucker, radio and television personality, as well as an author.
- Howard Van Hyning (1936–2010), percussionist with the New York City Opera
- William Vickrey, Columbia University professor, winner of the Nobel Memorial Prize in Economics
- Charles Webb, novelist, most notably of The Graduate
- Phideaux Xavier, progressive rock musician
- Ed Young, children's book author and illustrator
- Florenz Ziegfeld, Broadway impresario of theatrical spectaculars including the Ziegfeld Follies
- Charlotte Zolotow, children's book author and editor
- Maurice Zolotow, Hollywood biographer; author of first biography of Marilyn Monroe
