= Jan Owen (entrepreneur) =

Australian social entrepreneur and author (born 1959)

Jan Owen AM
- Born: 17 October 1959 (age 66); Melbourne
- Occupations: Social and business entrepreneur;author
- Years active: 1980–present
- Organization: AdaptabilityQ

Jan Owen is an Australian social and business entrepreneur, and author of Every Childhood Lasts a Lifetime (1996) and The Future Chasers (2014).

== Career ==
Owen was President of the Youth Affairs Council of Australia from 1984 to 1986, which included International Youth Year, held in 1985. In 1994, Owen founded the Create Foundation, which is directed to improving the lives of children and young people living in care. She was the inaugural CEO from 1994 to 2001. In 2002, Owen was appointed Executive Director of Social Ventures Australia, which was established to bring venture capital models to the non -government sector in Australia. Owen convened the second Social Enterprise World Forum, held in Melbourne 2009.

From September 2010 to December 2019, Owen was CEO of the Foundation for Young Australians (FYA). During her tenure, FYA launched the New Work Order research series, encompassing seven reports analyzing the impact of digitization, the Fourth Industrial Revolution, and the emergence of gig workers and the Precariat on employment pathways for young Australians. During this time, FYA also convened the Safe Schools Coalition Australia, directed to supporting school staff to create more inclusive school environments for same-sex-attracted, intersex and gender-diverse students, school staff and families.

In 2020, Owen was appointed Co-Chair of Learning Creates Australia, which is focused on reforming accreditation systems in the Australian education system. In the same year, she also co-founded AdaptabilityQ, a boutique strategic advisory service for non-government organisations. In 2023, Owen co-founded Be Well Health & Longevity, opening its first centre in Hawthorn, Victoria. In 2024, she was appointed Chair of Cool Australia, an ed-tech platform for Australian educators, students and parents. In that same year, she was appointed Director of Third Story, a social enterprise leading systems change across diverse sectors.

Owen holds several honorary appointments. In 2025, she was appointed Patron Emeritus, Good Design Australia, following her role as Patron from 2021-2025. Owen is the inaugural Chair of The Future Council, established to further the work of the film with the same name, released in 2025. She is an Ambassador of Children's Ground, which works with Aboriginal children.

== Awards and honours ==
Owen was given the 2025 Lifetime Achievement Award by CEO Magazine. She was named one of Australian Financial Review’s True Leaders in 2018 and was the Westpac & AFR inaugural Overall Woman of Influence in 2012. She has been awarded honorary Doctorates from the University of Sydney in 2014 and Murdoch University in 2018. Owen was awarded membership to the Order of Australia in 2000 for service to the welfare of children and youth.
