= Mengoni =

Mengoni is an Italian surname. Notable people with the surname include:

- Andrea Mengoni (born 1983), Italian footballer
- Giuseppe Mengoni (1829–1877), Italian architect
- Marco Mengoni (born 1988), Italian singer-songwriter
