= Ralph J. Menconi =

American sculptor

Ralph J. Menconi (June 17, 1915 – November 18, 1972) was a prominent sculptor and medallist, who received many accolades during his lifetime. Among them were the Ellen P. Speyer award for original sculpture in 1941, the Freedom Foundation Award, the Michelangelo Award, the American Numismatic Association's Sculptor of the Year award in 1970, and the Golden Plate Award of the American Academy of Achievement in 1971. He also received an honorary Doctorate in Fine Arts from Hamilton College, Clinton, New York, in 1971. He became known as the "Sculptor of Presidents" because of the 36-medal series of the American presidents he created for Presidential Art Medals.

== Early life ==
Menconi was born in Union City, New Jersey, the son of the architectural sculptor Raffaele E. Menconi and Josephine Zampieri Menconi. His father was born in Barga, Italy, a medieval mountain village in Tuscany. The elder Menconi studied in Florence and Carrara, and emigrated to the United States when he was in his late teens. He worked with the leading architects of the day, among them Carrere and Hastings whose classically-inspired buildings were erected in New York and elsewhere. The elder Mr. Menconi sculpted the ornate flagpole bases outside the New York Public Library in Manhattan.

Ralph J. Menconi was raised in Hastings-on-Hudson, New York and attended the nearby private day school, Scarborough School. At age 18, Menconi began the study of art at the National Academy of Design, New York, later attending Hamilton College. He earned his degree from Yale University, New Haven, where he received a Bachelor of Fine Arts in 1939. Menconi was awarded a fellowship from the Louis Comfort Tiffany Foundation at Laurelton Hall, Cold Spring Harbor, New York, before beginning military service in northern Africa and Europe in the Army Corps of Engineers during World War II. He attained the rank of Major and was awarded a bronze star among other distinctions.

In 1949, Ralph Menconi was admitted to the Municipal Art Society of New York, and was elected a Director of the Society in 1964.

He was honored in 1955 with membership in the Century Association, a group founded in New York in 1847 to recognize persons with accomplishments in the arts and letters. Ralph remained a Centurion until his passing in 1972.

== Sculpting ==
At age 22, as an apprentice to his father, Menconi created a sculpture titled "Mocha" depicting a young goat. The bronze of the subject entered the collection of Brookgreen Gardens, Murrells Inlet, South Carolina, where it remains to this day. Originally the home of Archer and Anna Hyatt Huntington, an accomplished sculptor, Brookgreen Gardens is now a large outdoor sculpture park of works by American sculptors, installed alongside extensive botanical gardens, and is open to the public. Mr. Menconi’s bronze medals, of Thomas Jefferson, Robert Fulton and Booker T Washington are also on display at Brookgreen Gardens. Menconi's other three-dimensional works include a statue of Christ at the Cathedral in Nassau, the Bahamas, large busts and fountains on the campuses of Pace University, New York City, and in Pleasantville, New York, and works at Depauw University, Indiana. Beginning in 1951, Menconi and his wife Marjorie Ewen Menconi and their children, Ralph II and Susan, lived in Pleasantville, New York, where Menconi was very active in civic affairs, serving on the village’s Board of Trustees and as Police Commissioner. He attached a studio to his early-American house in Pleasantville as a second workspace to supplement his primary studio in Manhattan. His work also includes extensive Biblical sculpture for the reredos of the Emmanuel Lutheran Church in Pleasantville.

== High relief ==
By the 1960s, Ralph Menconi had achieved a national reputation as a master of high relief portraits. He was much in demand as a designer of medals and plaques, and his work can be found all across the United States. His wood-carved reliefs of William Green and Samuel Gompers are in the main lobby of AFL-CIO headquarters in Washington, DC, and his portraits of the seven original Mercury astronauts are displayed near Launch Pad 4 at Cape Kennedy. His work on the door of St. Joseph’s Church in East Camden, New Jersey, depicts the life of the saint. The state of Alaska selected him to create their statehood medal in 1959, and President-elect Richard Nixon chose Menconi to design his inaugural medal, which was featured on the cover of Time magazine on January 24, 1969. He also designed memorial medals for John F. Kennedy in 1964, and Winston Churchill in 1965. Among his more than 900 works, Menconi created medals for the National Book Award, New York University Law School, Kenyon College, Hamilton College, the Capitol Historical Society in Washington, and the New-York Historical Society. He was also selected to design the first official medal of the American Bicentennial Commission.

Presidents Eisenhower, Johnson and Nixon sat personally for him, and President Johnson also commissioned a portrait medal for his own use in foreign travel. Menconi’s other well-known medallic series depicted every signer of the Declaration of Independence, and every state in the United States, using heroes chosen by the states’ historical societies. He also created a very popular series of medals portraying America’s Apollo mission in space. At the time of his death at age 57, Menconi was nearing completion of a series of medals celebrating the Great Religions of the World.

The American Numismatic Society lists 118 medal designs.

Ralph Menconi died suddenly of heart disease in his hometown of Pleasantville, New York on November 18, 1972, and is buried in Raymond Hill Cemetery in Carmel, New York next to his wife Marjorie.

Mr. Menconi and his family spent many summer vacations on Cape Cod, where his widow Marjorie resided until her death in 2019. The Cape Museum of Fine Arts in Dennis, Massachusetts held a retrospective exhibition of his work in 2001. Other exhibitions of his work plus the paintings by his widow Marjorie, were held at the Great Room Gallery in Yarmouth Port, MA in 2012, and at the museum of the Historical Society of Olde Yarmouth in 2018.In May, 2025 a bronze casting of “Mocha,” a young goat on display at Brookgreen Gardens, SC (see above), was unveiled by his son Ralph in the sculpture garden at the Cape Cod Museum of Art in Dennis MA.
