= Larchmont Yacht Club =

Private membership organization in New York

Coordinates: 40°55′29″N 73°44′40″W

- Burgee
- Founded: June 20, 1880; 145 years ago
- Location: Village of Larchmont, Westchester County, New York
- Website: www.larchmontyc.org

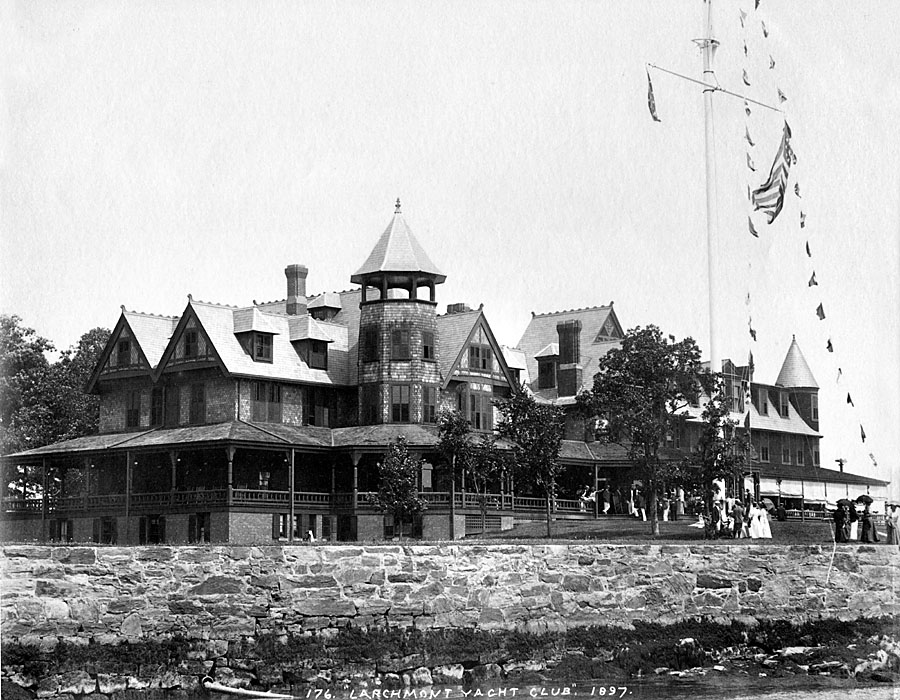
Larchmont Yacht Club, 1897, as photographed by John S. Johnston

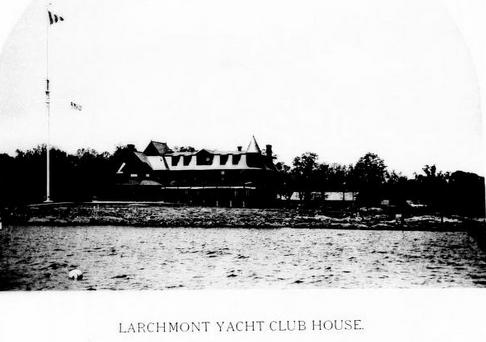
Larchmont Yacht Club House c 1894

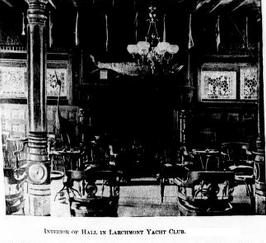
Larchmont Yacht Club House Interior c 1894

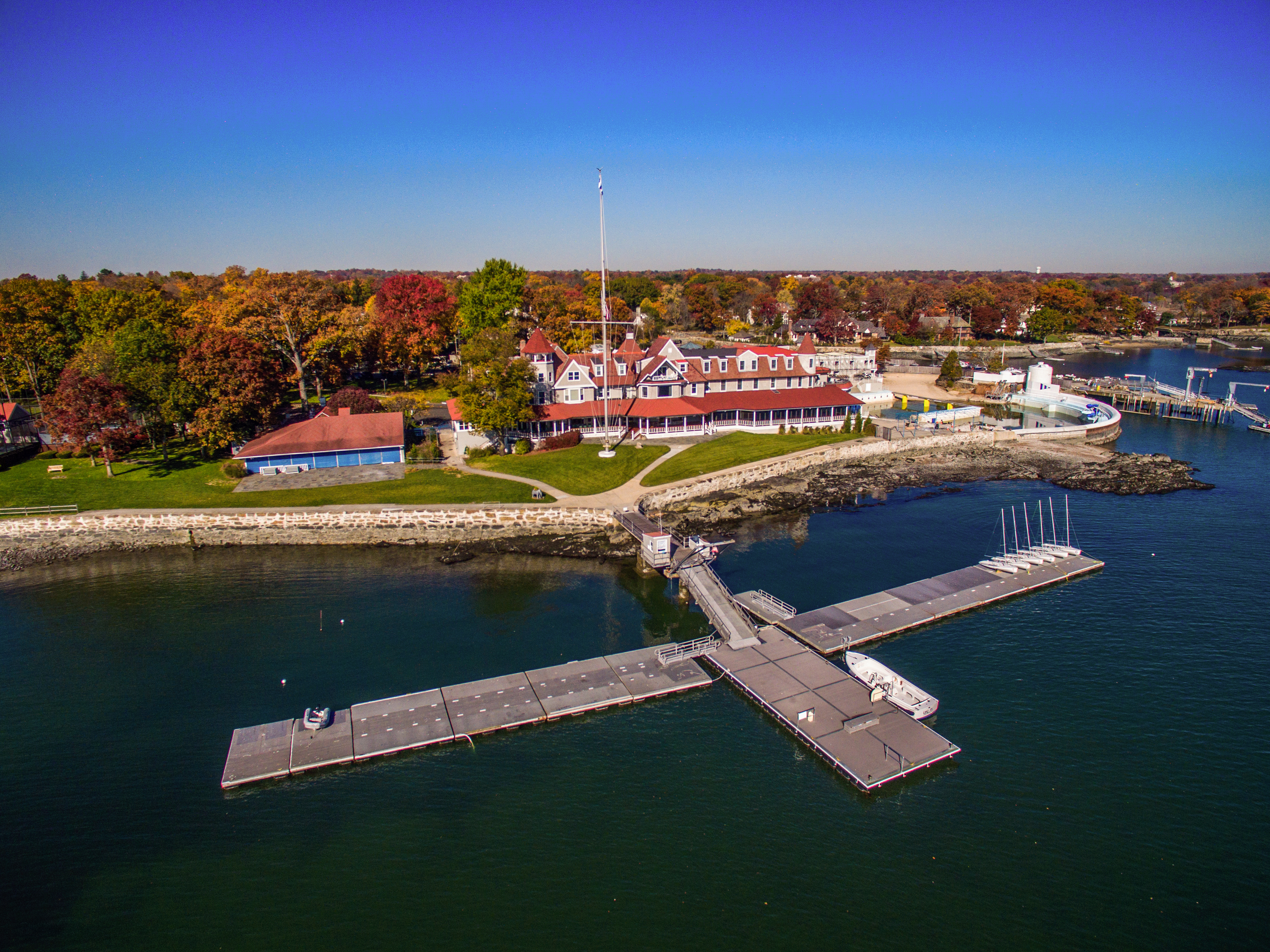
Larchmont Yacht Club 2016

Larchmont Yacht Club is a private, members-only yacht club situated on Larchmont Harbor in the Village of Larchmont, in Westchester County, New York.

== History ==
The club was founded in June 1880 by Frank L. Anthony, Fred W. Flint, William C. France, Loring Lothrop and Charles E. Jenkins.

== Clubhouse ==
The club was originally housed in a small church in Manor Park, overlooking Horseshoe Harbor. The mission stated in its incorporation was "to advance, foster and support the sport of yachting, the art of yacht designing and construction, and the science of seamanship and navigation, and to acquire and provide a suitable and convenient clubhouse, anchorage and harbor basin for the use of Its members."

== Regattas ==
Each year since 1885 the club has hosted the Larchmont Race Week, a nine-day-long event featuring hundreds of boats competing and racing in Long Island Sound. Sailors compete in offshore classes, one designs and junior sailboats. The club also hosts dinghy and keelboat regattas each season. By 1887 the club's membership had grown and it moved to its current location overlooking Larchmont Harbor.

The club hosted the 1949 Snipe World Championship and the 1996 Western Hemisphere & Orient Championship.

== Programs ==
Larchmont Yacht Club is home to several racing fleets, including Etchells, Shields, Herreshoff S Class Sailboat, International One Design, Ideal 18, Interclub Dinghy and Vanguard 15, as well as cruising boats. The club runs a junior sailing program and is host to the Mamaroneck High School sailing program, the Rye Country Day School sailing team and a college sailing regatta. Together with American Yacht Club, LYC has hosted the Robie Pierce Regatta, a regatta for sailors with disabilities.

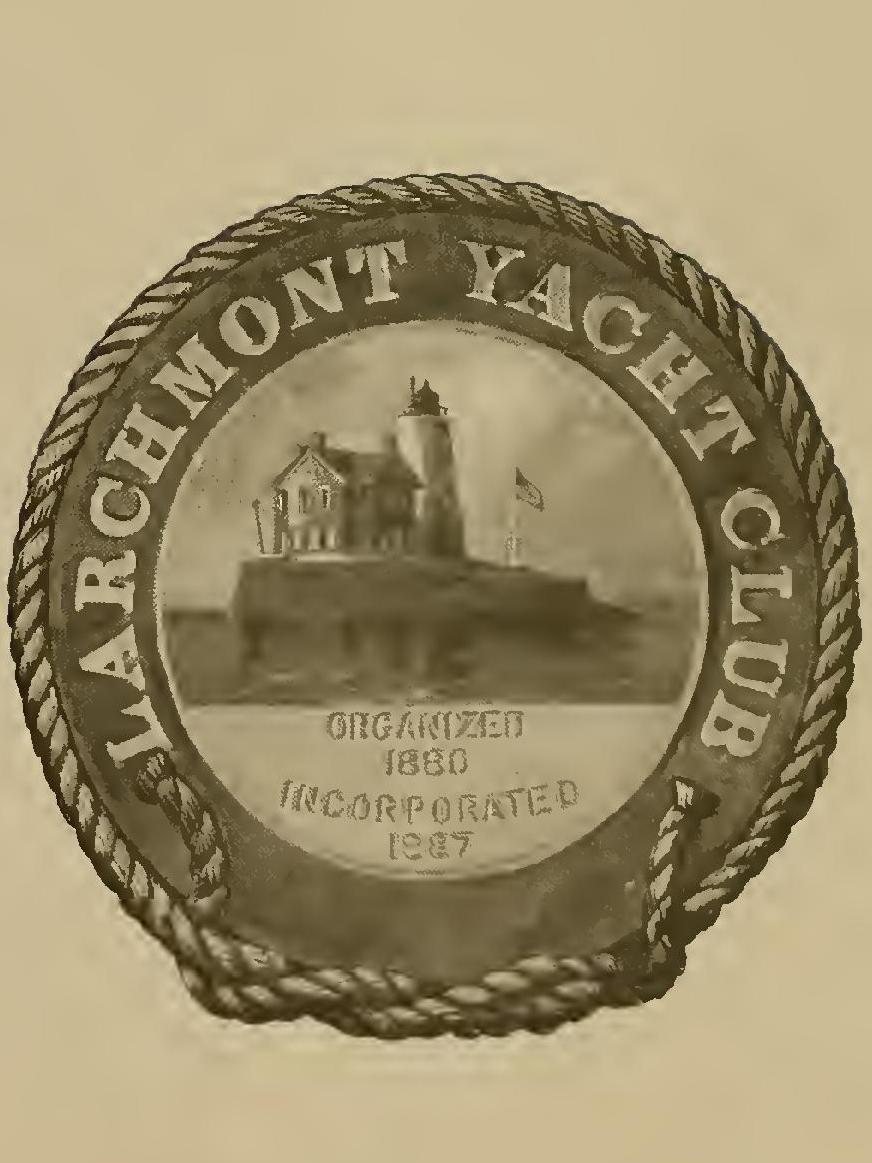
1896 logo

The club also has a junior tennis team and swimming and diving team that competes against other clubs teams in the area.
