= Larchmont (disambiguation) =

Larchmont may refer to:

== Communities ==
- Larchmont, Houston, a neighborhood
- Larchmont, Los Angeles, a neighborhood
- Larchmont, New York, a village in Westchester County

== Other ==
- Larchmont (Worcester, Massachusetts), a historic house
- Larchmont (Metro-North station), a railroad station in Larchmont, New York
- Larchmont Chronicle, a community newspaper in Los Angeles, California
- Larchmont Harbor (Long Island Sound), a bay in Westchester County, New York
- Larchmont Yacht Club, in Westchester County, New York

== See also ==
- Larchmont-Edgewater
