= Kids for World Health =

Kids for World Health (KFWH) aims to cover all aspects of the control and elimination of sleeping sickness, trypanosomiasis, Buruli ulcer, Chagas disease, and leishmaniasis. Kids For World Health's motto is "Life is important for all people, rich or poor."

== History ==
Kids for World Health was founded in 2001 at Chatsworth Avenue School, in Larchmont, New York by a then 3rd grade class who were motivated after watching a CBS film from "60 Minutes" on the Southern Sudan Sleeping Sickness Program in 1994. In the beginning, the class of 18 wrote many letters to pharmaceutical companies, contacted the United Nations, contacted the World Health Organization, and studied the research and materials from Doctors Without Borders. They met with the CEO of Bristol Meyers Squibb, and scheduled a trip to Washington, D.C., to lobby for African families to have access to drugs.

== Actions to date ==
KFWH Actions to date (April 2009):

- Construction of the first KFWH Pediatric Wing in the region of Yei, Sudan, servicing 90 villages.
- Funding of educational materials on prevention of Neglected Tropical Diseases for villagers in Tambora County, Sudan.
- Construction of a fully equipped kitchen for a hospital in Yei, Sudan.
- Construction of an equipped laboratory within a clinic in Yei, Sudan.
- Funding for training of doctors and assistants in Lisbon, Portugal.
- Construction of a second KFWH Pediatric Wing in Duk County, Sudan servicing 150,000 villagers.
- Construction of a third KFWH Pediatric Wing in Kaliua, Tanzania servicing 250,000 villagers.
- Construction of a fourth KFWH Pediatric Wing at the Lwala Hospital in Otuboi Sub County, Uganda for the treatment of Sleeping Sickness and Malaria, servicing 25,000 villagers.
- Support of the John Bul Dau Clinic and KFWH Treatment Room in Duk County, Sudan for the treatment of Neglected Tropical Diseases.
