= National Association of Professional Women =

The International Association of Women (IAW) is a for-profit professional association and networking platform founded in 2007. It is fully owned by Professional Diversity Network (NASDAQ:IPDN) since 2014.

== History ==
The National Association of Professional Women was founded in 2007 by Matthew Proman,

In 2013, NAPW.com was voted one of Forbes’ Best 100 Websites for Women.

In July 2014 Professional Diversity Network (NASDAQ:IPDN) Announced a merger with NAPW which was completed on September 24, 2014. As a result of this transaction, Star Jones, Matthew Proman, Randi Zuckerberg, and Donna Brazile joined PDN's Board of Directors. Jones was also named President of Professional Diversity Network, and Proman served as Director and Chief Operating Officer. According to Professional Diversity Network's press release, at the time of the merger, NAPW shown revenues in excess of $19 Million and Positive Cash Flow. According to SEC 10K filing from September 2017, NAPW revenue for the last Quarter ending in September 2017 was $2,223,194 with a net loss of (1,528,231). NAPW's Parent company Professional Diversity Network shares lost over 90% of its value since the Merger was confirmed, dropping from $44.72 (adj. close) to $4.07.

In July 2016, Professional Diversity Network, Inc. announced that its COO and Director, Matthew Proman, had resigned his positions and his Board seat earlier in the year to "pursue other ventures." At the time of his departure, Proman stated that he felt confident that he had "left the company in good hands and that NAPW will continue to flourish and drive shareholder value." PDN's CEO at the time, Jim Kirsch, stated at the time that PDN was "never stronger."

In 2016, IPDN found itself in a precarious position. Revenue from the NAPW Network dried up after two of the three offices NAPW operated prior to the Merger were closed, which significantly reduced the size of the operation. In the 2nd quarter of 2016 revenue continued to nosedive, with sales down by one-third and only just over $1.3mil left on the balance sheet. By the 3rd quarter, the cash balance had dwindled to just over $500k and the company was in need of an urgent solution to avoid bankruptcy. On August 15, 2016 a group of Chinese investors bought a majority stake in IPDN (NAPW's parent company) for $20mil via a Seychelles based shell company called Cosmic Forward Limited (CFL). All shareholders involved are executives of a Chinese company called GNet Group. Gnet Group (Gate Wang) has been criticized by Southern Weekly, a respected Chinese newspaper, as a scam that dupes small, unsophisticated investors out of their savings. GNet investors have taken to the streets to protest the company and have formed Internet forums to expose what some claim is a Ponzi scheme.

According to PDN's SEC filings, NAPW experienced a steady decline since acquired by Professional Diversity Network in 2014, with reported revenue dropping every quarter. In August 2017 NAPW's CEO leaves the company and her departure is followed by a significant reduction in force that took place in late September 2017.

=== Launch of the International Association of Women (IAW) (2018) ===
In January 2018, Professional Diversity Network announced through a Press Release that it will be launching International Association of Women (IAW). According to the official communication distributed to the media, IAW would be operating independently from NAPW, but other sources from the company indicate that the launch of IAW was actually a rebranding of NAPW. In the 2nd paragraph of the Press Release it reads"The company currently operates the National Association of Professional Women (“NAPW”), whose membership is now also expected to benefit from this international opportunity in addition to the vast array of additional benefits launched in 2017." However, IAW's blog included a rewritten version of the same press release that replaces the second paragraph with: "The National Association of Professional Women (“NAPW”) has been rebranded as IAW through this launch. Under the new brand name of IAW, existing NAPW members will benefit from this international opportunity in addition to the vast array of additional benefits launched in 2017"'. All NAPW social media properties had been either shut down or redirected to IAW properties This is the second time PDN announces the launch of IAW. According to an official Press Release from October 3, 2017, the brand had already been launched during the Women's Forum Global Meeting in Paris on October 5.

== Projects ==
=== National conferences (2011-2014) ===
The Annual NAPW National Networking Conferences was an event held every year in New York City between 2011 and 2014 which presented speakers with varied fields of expertise, who imparted their experiences of business. The 2011 NAPW National Networking Conference featured keynote speaker, Ivanka Trump, Executive Vice President of Development and Acquisitions, The Trump Organization; Herta von Stiegel, Creator, Ariya Capital; Kathy Caprino, Psychotherapist and Executive Coach; Hilary Kramer, Commentator, Nightly Business Report and Valerie Smaldone, Host, NY Lite FM – 106.7.

The 2012 National Networking Conference, Transitions: Take Control of Your Future, was hosted by Star Jones, the organization's National Spokesperson and Chief Development Officer. Featured speakers included Sara Blakely, Chief Executive Officer and Founder of Spanx; Randi Zuckerberg, former Marketing Director of Facebook, Denise Incandela, then President, Saks Direct; Christie Hefner, CEO, Canyon Ranch Enterprises; Janet Rolle, EVP and CMO, CNN Worldwide; Christina Norman, Media Strategist and Editor, Huffington Post; Liza Huber, CEO and Founder, Sage Bears; Heather Freeland, Head of Global Marketing Communications, Facebook; Beth Ann Kaminkow, President and CEO, TracyLocke; Paige Mackenzie, LPGA Tour Professional; Judy Smith, Founder and President, Smith & Company and Kathleen Rice, Nassau County, NY District Attorney.

The 2013 National Networking Conference, Spark. Ignite Your Network, was held on April 26, 2013, at the Sheraton New York Times Square Hotel in New York City, hosted by Star Jones with over 1,200 members in attendance, featured keynote speakers included Martha Stewart and Arianna Huffington. The NAPW Power Panel included Lesley Jane Seymour, Editor-in-Chief of More magazine; Desirée Rogers, Chief Executive Officer of Johnson Publishing Company; Monique Nelson, Chief Executive Officer of Uniworld (a division of WPP); and Kim Garst, Chief Executive Officer of Boom Social. Workshop experts included Bonnie Marcus, Founder and Principal, Women's Success Coaching; Danielle Miller, Creator, Naked Branding; Ana Berry, TV Host; Sue Stanek; PhD, Founder, Inspiring Results and Kathleen Barton, MBA, Your Life Balance Coach.

=== NAPW Foundation ===
Created by Matthew Proman and Star Jones in May 2014, the NAPW Foundation is the company's nonprofit philanthropic endeavor designed to support causes that are front burner issues for women. The American Heart Association, of which she is also the National Volunteer; the Breast Cancer Research Foundation; Dress for Success and Girls, Inc. are the founding philanthropic partners. NAPW Local Chapter philanthropic initiatives are based around these charitable organizations as well as other local community fundraising events. Support for other charities and nonprofit organizations focused on women's issues and child wellness, and included the Jack Martin Fund at the pediatric oncology unit of Mt. Sinai Hospital, (for which Proman is member of the Advisory Board) and the American Cancer Society and the Jack Theissen Children's Society. NAPW and the NAPW Foundation hold no relationship with "Napw Charitable Foundation" As of January 2018 the NAPW foundation seems inactive, its social media properties have not been updated since January 2017 and the website www.napwfoundation.org is no longer online.

=== Education scholarships ===
NAPW created the Rising Stars Education Scholarship Program, awarding scholarships to graduating high school seniors and undergraduate students who attend an accredited college, university or certified trade school in the U.S. Open to daughters of organization members, the scholarships are awarded to five outstanding students. The Rising Stars program was active until 2014.

== Complaints ==
As of January 2018 NAPW carries an "F" rating with the Better Business Bureau (BBB). BBB's report states that the company's rating is due to 163 open complaints, 58 negative reviews and 0 positive reviews filed within the past three years, the length of time the company took to respond to complaints, its failure to resolve their underlying causes, and the nature of its advertising.

The majority of complaints stem from the organization advertising and telling consumers that their membership is free, but once getting in contact with consumers they require annual membership fees that run up to $1000 a year. The organization does not offer written information on membership packages, but rather require that consumers choose over the phone which package they want and provide payment information before their membership application is processed.

The report further indicates that consumers "were subjected to high pressure sales tactics by company representatives to join the organization even before they understood the costs or benefits. Other consumers that originally agreed to join the organization but opted afterward to cancel the membership say that they have difficulty reaching any company representatives to seek a refund."

Yelp members currently rate the business at 1 star, mostly due to misleading sales practices. Previous and current employees substantiate much of the consumer complaints on the company's Glassdoor profile.

The increasing number of complaints and the severely damaged reputation of the NAPW brand and might have contributed to the decision of rebooting the operation under a new brand.

== See also ==
- List of professional organizations
- List of women's organizations
