= Ann Aurelia López =

Ann Aurelia Lopez
- Title: Professor emerita, Executive director

Academic background
- Education: University of California, Riverside (Bachelor's degree); University of California, Santa Barbara (Master's degree); University of California, Santa Cruz (Ph.D.)

Ann Aurelia López is an environmental studies scholar and a team member of the Society for the Advancement of Chicanos/Hispanics and Native Americans in Science. López is also the founder and executive director of the non-profit Center for Farmworker Families.

== Early life ==
Ann Aurelia López was born in southern California to a working class, interracial family. Being Mexican-American and Anglo-American, López grew up with the stigmas and biases placed on minorities in America. Although growing up wasn’t the easiest, López was surrounded by a family of teachers and because of it, found comfort in her schooling. Her science courses provided her the stability and support she needed to excel through high school and continue on to college.

== Education ==
After finishing high school, López attended University of California, Riverside, earning a bachelor's degree in environmental biology. She then attended University of California, Santa Barbara, where she received her master's degree in environmental biology in 1969. López also began teaching environmental science, ecology, biology, and botany at San Jose City College. Continuing past a master's degree, López pursued her doctorate at the University of California, Santa Cruz in 1994, completing the degree in 2002.

== Career ==
López is the founder and executive director of the Center for Farmworker Families, which is a 501(c)(3) organization that aims to improve the lives of Mexican-American binational farmers and their families while educating the public about the hardships and inequalities they experience. The organization works directly with farmers and communities to carry out projects in Mexico and California, including funding, structures, and educational resources.

Prior to her position as executive director, López was a professor at San José City College where she taught biology and environmental science courses. She was hired in 1969 and is now retired. She is credited as a prominent figure in the creation of the university’s environmental science program.

== Publications ==
In 2007, the University of California Press published López’s book, titled The Farmworkers’ Journey. The book includes ten years’ worth of interviews López conducted with farmers throughout Mexico and California. It also includes her own research on commercial agriculture and how these farmers are taken advantage of.

== Awards and recognition ==
López has received the following awards for her work:

- 16th Annual Cesar E. Chavez Community Award from the City of Watsonville, California, March 2018
- Democratic Ideals Award from the Crosson North County Democratic Club, May 2017
- National Association of Professional Women - Woman of the Year for the 29th Assembly District of California, 2013 and 2014
- Society for the Anthropology of North America (SANA) book prize – honorable mention for her book The Farmworkers’ Journey, 2007
