= Play for P.I.N.K. =

Play for P.I.N.K. (Prevention, Immediate diagnosis, New technology and Knowledge) is a fundraising organization founded by Laura Lassman, which organizes golf tournaments to raise money for breast cancer research. The organization formed in 1990 after Lassman organized a tournament in Bergen County, New Jersey to support a friend undergoing cancer treatment.

Play for P.I.N.K. donates solely to the Breast Cancer Research Foundation (BCRF), and is BCRF's largest donor. Their total contributions to BCRF since 1990 were approximately $75 million, as of 2023. In 2023, it was estimated that 30,000 people took part in charity events held by Play for P.I.N.K. every year.

A financial partnership with Bloomberg allows all raised funds to be donated directly to BCRF, cutting administrative costs. Other important corporate partners include Estée Lauder and Wilson Sporting Goods.
