= Star Jones =

American television personality (born 1962)

- Jones in 2026
- Born: Starlet Marie Jones; March 24, 1962 (age 64); Badin, North Carolina, U.S.
- Other names: Star Jones Reynolds; Star Jones Lugo
- Education: American University (BA); University of Houston (JD)
- Occupations: Lawyer; journalist; talk show host; writer; women's advocate; fashion designer
- Years active: 1991–present
- Notable credits: The View (1997–2006); Star Jones (2007–2008); Divorce Court (2022–present)
- Spouses: Al Reynolds (m. 2004; div. 2008) Ricardo Lugo (m. 2018)

Starlet Marie "Star" Jones (born March 24, 1962) is an American lawyer, journalist, television personality, fashion designer, author, and women's and diversity advocate. She is best known as one of the first co-hosts on the ABC morning talk show The View, which she appeared on for nine seasons from 1997–98 through 2005–06. She was also one of sixteen contestants of the fourth installment of The Celebrity Apprentice in 2011, coming in fifth place. She currently serves as the host of Divorce Court, which earned her a Daytime Emmy Award in 2026.

== Early life ==
Jones was born in Badin, North Carolina, and grew up in Trenton, New Jersey, with her mother, a human services administrator, and her stepfather, a municipal security chief.

Jones graduated from Notre Dame High School in Lawrenceville, New Jersey. She earned a B.A. degree in Administration of Justice at American University, where she was initiated into the Lambda Zeta chapter of Alpha Kappa Alpha sorority. Jones earned a J.D. degree from the University of Houston Law Center in 1986, and was admitted to the New York state bar in 1987.

== Television career ==
From 1986 to 1991, Jones was a prosecutor with the Kings County District Attorney's Office in Brooklyn, New York. In 1992, she was elevated to senior assistant district attorney. She was recruited by Court TV in 1991 as a commentator for the William Kennedy Smith rape trial and spent several years as a legal correspondent for NBC's Today and NBC Nightly News.

In 1994, she was given her own court show, Jones & Jury, which mimicked the arbitration-based reality format of The People's Court, though with a blended talk show like set and style. Although the show was canceled after only one season, it made Jones the first Black person to serve as a court show judge. Though not the first female to serve as a court show judge, Jones is the first female to preside over the court show subcategory of arbitration-based reality programming, only Joseph Wapner preceding her.

Jones then became chief legal analyst on Inside Edition, where she led the coverage of the O. J. Simpson murder case. She was the only reporter to interview Simpson during his civil trial, which she covered for American Journal.

=== The View ===
In 1997, Jones joined The View as one of its original four co-hosts. Jones' nine-season tenure on The View was marked by controversy at times. Jones, who had been diagnosed as morbidly obese, began to undergo dramatic weight loss beginning in 2003. In a September 2007 essay in Glamour magazine, she revealed that she had undergone gastric bypass surgery in August 2003, resulting in a loss of 160 pounds (73 kilograms) over three years. Many criticized Jones for her initial dishonesty when she claimed she had lost weight via diet and exercise. Barbara Walters told Oprah Winfrey in May 2008 that she had kept Jones' gastric bypass surgery a secret because Jones had asked her to, and that saying otherwise on the show had turned the audience off.

When she married investment banker Al Reynolds in 2004, Jones talked about her wedding plans on The View for months beforehand, including "plugs" (public mentions) for her suppliers, such as the wedding invitations, clothing, and airlines. It was later revealed that Jones had pushed product-placement in exchange for receiving those products and services for free. ABC claimed that her excessive self-promotion alienated viewers. On April 21, 2006, ABC told Jones that it would not renew her contract for the following season.

Privately, ABC, Barbara Walters, and Bill Geddie then told Jones she could go out on "her own terms". They collectively decided for Jones to announce her impending departure on June 29, but Jones announced it two days earlier following a commercial break. Jones said she would remain on the show through July. Jones did not mention on air that her contract had not been renewed.

In an interview with People, Jones said she had been told in April that her contract would not be renewed. Jones said that the decision to leave was not her own, saying, "What you don't know is that my contract was not renewed for the 10th season... I feel like I was fired."

On the next day's program, Walters said that they had instructed Jones to publicly claim she was leaving voluntarily, but Jones decided to tell the truth about her leaving and surprised them with a public announcement of her involuntarily leaving the show. Walters said she had been "blindsided" by Jones' announcement on air the previous day. Walters announced that Jones would no longer appear on the show with the exception of previously recorded segments.

A few days later, Jones was interviewed on Larry King Live. When asked about her on-air statements about her wedding, Jones said that every mention of her wedding had been specifically approved and negotiated by the network and that nothing she said had been in violation of any policy. Despite ABC's claims that market research had shown her public approval rating had decreased, she said she had not caused a ratings drop, and she said that the show's ratings during the 2004–05 season were the highest The View had had in the nine years she was a co-host.

Brian Frons, ABC's president of daytime television, told Entertainment Weekly that Jones should have been fired long ago and that he should have encouraged Walters to fire her the previous year. ABC said that viewers did not like Jones talking about her weight loss and her wedding preparations.

Jones' departure caused a rift between her and Walters that lasted nearly six years. In May 2008, in response to allegations in Barbara Walters's autobiography, Audition, Jones told Us Weekly, "It is a sad day when an icon like Barbara Walters, in the sunset of her life, is reduced to publicly branding herself as an adulterer, humiliating an innocent family with accounts of her illicit affair and speaking negatively against me all for the sake of selling a book. It speaks to her true character." Walters did not respond.

When the series went into summer reruns, only programs in which she had been absent from the panel were rebroadcast. Jones' name was removed from the opening credits, leaving only Walters, Joy Behar, and Elisabeth Hasselbeck. Jones was eventually replaced by Sherri Shepherd in September 2007.

On February 22, 2012, Jones returned to The View as a guest, and has made subsequent guest appearances since then.

=== truTV ===
On March 7, 2007, Jones announced that she would return to her original network, Court TV—now rebranded truTV—as its new executive editor of daytime programming, and that she would host an eponymous live weekday talk show based on the law and pop culture. Star Jones premiered on August 20, 2007, as a guest-driven live broadcast (with taped segments) covering recent stories from the worlds of pop culture, entertainment, crime, and justice.

Just six months later, her show was canceled, and it was announced that Jones was leaving truTV due to "changes in their programming selection." The final episode of Star Jones aired on February 1, 2008. Jones received the balance on her $24 million, three-year contract, and the network stated that Jones was eliminated from the channel's lineup because it deemed Jones "too serious" for its tabloid-focused coverage. However, according to The Washington Post, "[Jones'] show averaged 186,000 viewers and, by its final telecast, was down in the neighborhood of 85,000." In January 2011, the talk show was featured among "10 Notable Talk Show Failures" by CNBC.com.

=== Other appearances ===
From September 2004 to September 2005, Jones was a red-carpet host for the E! television network, conducting interviews at awards shows. E! declined to renew her contract after one year.

Jones has hosted or guest-hosted numerous cable programs, including the HGTV program House Hunters in New York City (which "scored the largest household ratings in the cable channel's history"), the Michael Eric Dyson radio show, Larry King Live (where she interviewed Beyoncé Knowles while King was on vacation), and The Bad Girls Club Season 2 reunion on the Oxygen Network.

In addition, she has made acting appearances on Law & Order: Special Victims Unit (where she played a former incarnation of herself—a Brooklyn prosecutor named Star Jones—in the eighth-season finale), and as a judge in Drop Dead Diva in August 2012.

She has also served as a legal analyst for The Insider and Dr. Phil, and appeared on The Wendy Williams Show.

On July 17, 2009, Jones appeared on a celebrity version of Are You Smarter than a 5th Grader?, during which she won $25,000 to benefit The East Harlem School at Exodus House, a New York City middle school for underserved populations.

Jones was also a contestant on the fourth season of The Celebrity Apprentice. She placed fifth on the show, eliminated after her brand messaging efforts in a TV commercial for OnStar were not well received by the OnStar executives.

Jones became the current judge on Divorce Court starting with the program's 40th season, on September 19, 2022. She replaced Faith Jenkins.

=== Books ===
Jones is the author of You Have to Stand for Something, or You'll Fall for Anything, a collection of autobiographical essays published in 1998. Her second book, Shine: A Physical, Emotional, and Spiritual Journey to Finding Love (2006), detailed changes she made to reshape her life, including her marriage and dramatic weight loss. She released a third book in March 2011, Satan's Sisters, a roman à clef about a fictional television talk show featuring five women of clashing temperaments. A scripted television series based on Satan's Sisters, titled Daytime Divas, aired for one season on VH1 from June 5 to July 31, 2017. Jones served as an executive producer on the series, and guest-starred as herself in the July 24, 2017, episode.

== Affiliations ==
Jones is the President of the National Association of Professional Women (NAPW). She created the organization's philanthropic endeavor, NAPW Foundation, to benefit the American Heart Association, of which Jones is also a National Volunteer; the Breast Cancer Research Foundation; Dress For Success and Girls, Inc. Jones also conducts regular visits to NAPW Local Chapters and hosts the organization’s annual National Networking Conference.

Jones is also the president of Professional Diversity Network (NASDAQ: IPDN). She is also a member of its board of directors, becoming the youngest of a small circle of African-American women in the US leading a public company.

In 2022, President Joe Biden named Jones to serve as the chair of the U.S. Commission for the Preservation of America’s Heritage Abroad.

== Personal life ==
Jones underwent gastric bypass surgery in 2003. She lost 160 pounds as a result of the procedure.

Jones married investment banker Al Reynolds on November 13, 2004. Reynolds proposed to Jones during the 2004 NBA All-Star Game. Amid much publicity, the wedding was held at Saint Bartholomew's Church in New York City in front of five hundred guests and featured three matrons of honor, twelve bridesmaids, two junior bridesmaids, three best men, twelve groomsmen, three junior groomsmen, six footmen, four ring bearers, and four flower girls. More than thirty corporate "sponsors" donated wedding attire and merchandise for the event in exchange for mentions in the media and on Jones's website. After the wedding, Jones began using the name "Star Jones Reynolds" professionally, but reverted to "Star Jones" in 2007, telling Entertainment Weekly that she wanted to keep her public persona separate from her private self. On March 9, 2008, Jones and Reynolds announced they were divorcing.

On March 17, 2010, Jones underwent cardiac surgery related to a surgery she had three decades earlier for a thoracic tumor.

On October 24, 2017, Jones went public with her engagement to Ricardo Lugo, who recently worked in the Cook County State’s Attorney’s Office. Lugo was employed as an assistant state's attorney from April to August, according to a State’s Attorney’s Office spokesperson. He was one of 17 prosecutors laid off because of county budget issues. Jones married Ricardo Lugo on a cruise ship in the Bahamas on Sunday, March 25, 2018.
