= Horseshoe Harbor (Long Island Sound) =

Bay north shore of Long Island Sound

- Location within New York
- Location: Larchmont, New York
- Coordinates: 40.9170436°N 73.7471°W
- Islands: none

Horseshoe Harbor is a bay located on the north shore of Long Island Sound, in the village of Larchmont in Westchester County, New York. This small cove lies just westward of Larchmont Harbor and is used as a launch anchorage for small recreational boats. The deeper water in the entrance favors the eastern side, and the northwest side of the cove is bare at low tide. A rock, bare at low water and marked by a private spindle with can, lies 60 yards off the south side of the point on the west side at the entrance.
