= Peter Coleman (sailor) =

Peter J. Coleman
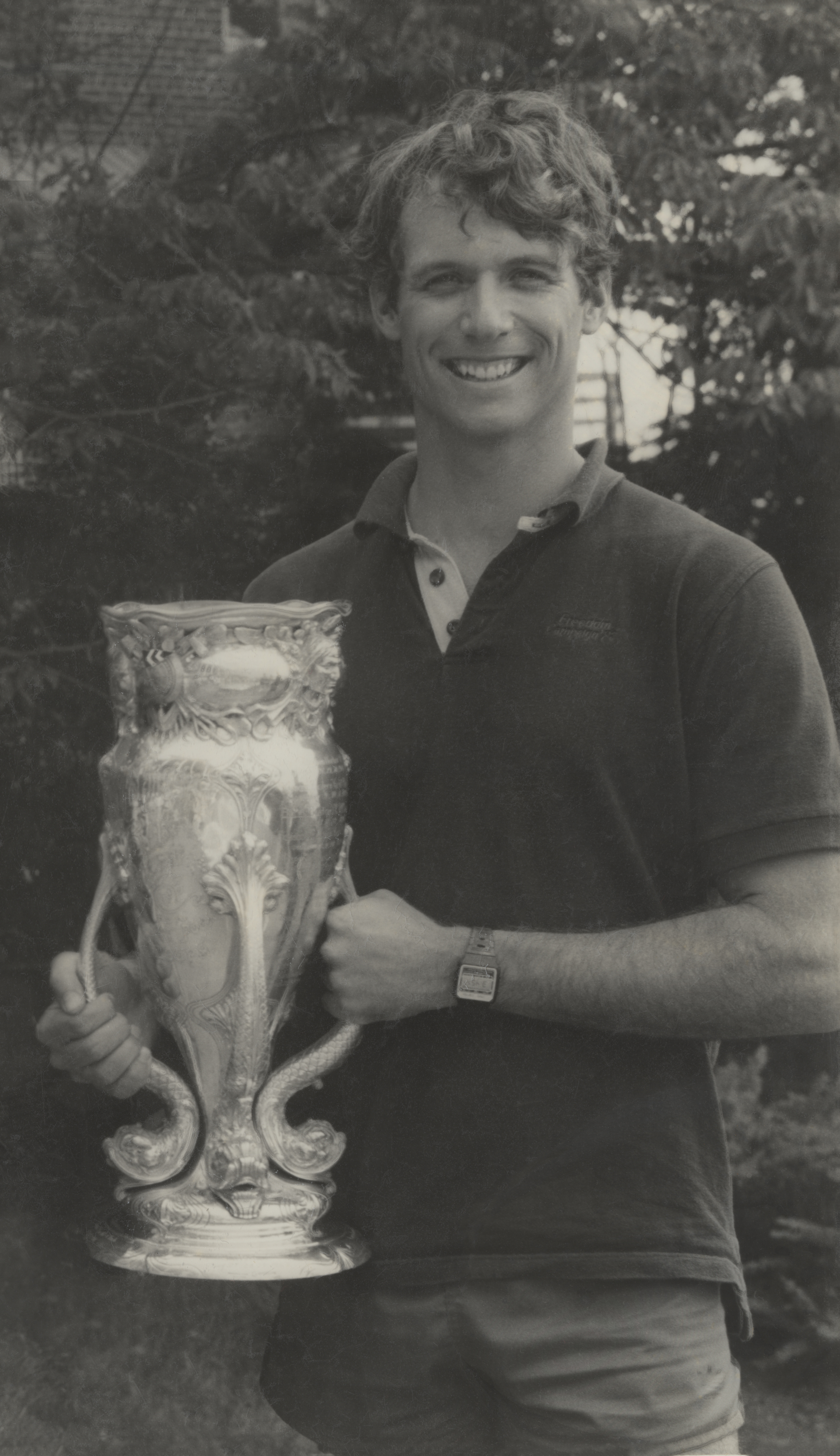
- Peter Coleman

Personal information
- Nationality: American
- Born: Peter James Coleman

Sailing career
- Sport: Sailing
- College team: New York Maritime College
- Club: US Sailing Team
- Classes: Soling, Etchells
Medal record
United States Sailing Championship
Gold medal – first place	1983 Mallory Cup	Etchells class

Peter J. Coleman is an American competitive sailor. Peter and his brothers Paul Coleman and Gerard grew up in Larchmont, New York close to Horseshoe Harbour and entered into sailing as Team Coleman.

== Early life ==
Peter and Paul were both students at New York Maritime College, and after competing in the 1976 Olympic trials for 470, teamed up with Gerard in the Soling. Coleman has competed in the J/24, Soling and Etchells classes.

== Sailing career ==
Peter is named in the Inter-collegiate Sailing Association Hall of Fame. He is a North American Champion, and, with his brothers Paul and Gerard, has missed qualifying for the Olympics five separate times. He competed with Paul in the United States Sailing Championship at the 1983 Mallory Cup, and won the gold medal.

== See also ==
US Sailing
