= Mamaroneck Union Free School District =

School district in the U.S. state of New York

Location
- 1000 West Boston Post Road, Mamaroneck (Westchester County) New York 10543 United States
- Coordinates: 40.941138°N 73.743349°W

District information
- Type: Public
- Grades: Pre-Kindergarten to 12
- Superintendent: Dr. Charles Sampson
- Schools: 6
- Budget: $122,334,000 (2008-2009 school year)
- NCES District ID: 3618240.

Students and staff
- Students: 5,565 (2023–24)
- Teachers: 442.46 (on an FTE basis)
- Student–teacher ratio: 12.58

Other information
- Website: www.mamkschools.org

The Mamaroneck Union Free School District is the school district created to serve the public education needs of Larchmont and Mamaroneck, New York.

It serves the Town of Mamaroneck, the Village of Larchmont and the part of the Village of Mamaroneck that is within the Town of Mamaroneck. The part of the Village of Mamaroneck within the Town of Rye is served by the Rye Neck Union Free School District.

The school district comprises four elementary schools serving grades K–5:

- Central School
- Chatsworth Avenue School
- Mamaroneck Avenue School
- Murray Avenue School

There is one middle school serving grades 6–8:

- Hommocks Middle School

And one high school serving grades 9–12:

- Mamaroneck High School

The district offices are in the High School.
