= Manor Park, Larchmont =

Coordinates: 40°55′02″N 73°44′55″W

Manor Park is a park in the village of Larchmont, New York. It consists of about 13 acres (53,000 m^{2}) of land (with a shoreline of more than 5,000 feet (1,500 m)) that lies along the Long Island Sound and Larchmont Harbor. It is well known for its striated rocks, gazebos, scenic views, and walking pathways.

The history of Manor Park goes back to 1614 when a Dutch ship captain "reported seeing campfires" belonging to the Siwanoy Indians in the area that now comprises the park. Within a century, British and Dutch settlers had purchased much of the land.

In 1661, John Richbell, a wealthy trader purchased "three necks" of land from "Chiefs Wappaquewam and Manhattan" with the "middle neck" consisting of the land comprising Larchmont and Manor Park. Samuel Palmer purchased the "middle neck" in 1701. Afterward, he and his family resided in the area until 1790 when most of the land was purchased by Peter Jay Munro, a nephew of John Jay, one of the "Founding Fathers" and the first Chief Justice of the U.S. Supreme Court. After Munro’s ownership, Thomas J.S. Flint purchased the property comprising Manor Park and much of the Village of Larchmont and established the Larchmont Manor Company with plans of "developing the [area] into a suburban community..." During the 1870s, he reserved 6 acres (24,000 m^{2}) of waterfront land and named it Larchmont Manor Park, which became the heart of today’s park.

Afterwards, the Larchmont Manor Park Society was established in 1892 to "maintain, preserve and protect the park" which also includes "nearby Fountain Square and four small traffic islands" and Manor Beach. The Society’s latest endeavors included a successful $1 million capital improvement campaign in 2003 to provide for seawall reinforcement and repairs, path curbing and repairs, landscaping, replacement of an old chain-link fence, and rebuilding of the west gazebo and a permanent endowment fund as well as an art show "Manor Park—In All Seasons" in May 2004.

Although Manor Park is privately owned, it is open to the public from dawn to dusk.

During Hurricane Sandy in 2012, much of the seaway was destroyed by storm surges, and a small part of the park was eroded into the water.
