= Anna Tackmeyer =

American chef

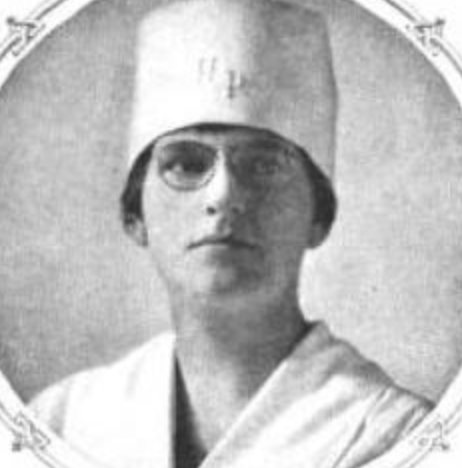
- Anna Tackmeyer, from a 1919 publication
- Born: Anna Ford; 1879
- Died: May 28, 1920 (aged 40–41); Larchmont, New York, U.S.
- Occupation: Chef

Anna Ford Tackmeyer (1879 – May 28, 1920) was an American chef. During World War I she was a chef at New York City's Hotel Pennsylvania.

== Career ==
Tackmeyer ran a lunchroom at the New York Public Library for three years, and traveled as a baking powder saleswoman for a chemical company for another three years. She was a chef at New York City's Hotel Pennsylvania during World War I. She presided over the Home Cooking Department and its separate all-female kitchen staff. "There is no reason why a woman who can cook for ten people cannot cook for ten times as many, and have the cooked food taste as good in one case as in the other.

Tackmeyer also lectured on food conservation, and demonstrated baking techniques, especially with alternative flours including soybean flour, oatmeal, buckwheat, and cornmeal. Her recipes for oatmeal bread and apricot fritters appeared in a 1917 cookbook focused on the uses of baking powder.

== Personal life ==
Ford married Mr. Tackmeyer and had a daughter, Hazel, in 1896. Anna Tackmeyer died in 1920, in Larchmont, New York, survived by her daughter.
