= Bill Buchan Sr. =

Scottish-born American sailor, yacht designer, and boat builder

Bill Buchan Sr. was a Scottish-born American sailor, yacht designer, and boat builder.

Buchan won the 1955 Clifford Day Mallory Cup together with William Earl Buchan and Ron McFarlane for Pacific International YA. Together with his son John Buchan, he designed the Buchan 37 yacht in the 1960s.

He was the father of Olympic sailor William Carl Buchan and grand father of Olympic sailor William Carl Buchan.
