= Andrew Shapiro =

American composer and songwriter (born 1975)

- Born: September 5, 1975 (age 50); New York City, New York, United States
- Genres: Synthpop, Classical, Minimalism, Ambient
- Occupation: Composer
- Instruments: Vocals, Piano, Synthesizer, Woodwinds
- Years active: 1999-present
- Website: andrewshapiro.com

Andrew Shapiro is an American composer and songwriter. He has characterized his music as having been primarily influenced by "80's new wave pop and Philip Glass minimalism."

From 2004 to 2013 Shapiro regularly performed his solo piano compositions and improvisations at a McDonald's fast-food restaurant in downtown Manhattan for which he was profiled in The New York Times. He was described as the “Best Pianist in a Fast-Food Restaurant” in the Village Voice. Performance highlights include The Kennedy Center in Washington, DC, the Exit Festival in Novi Sad, Serbia, TED, Bard College, Joe's Pub, Gracie Mansion, Bargemusic and the Wordless Music series at Le Poisson Rouge, New York.

Shapiro's music has been played on the radio worldwide and his music has been mentioned in The New Yorker, ABC News, CNN, Gramophone and Daily Candy. His most popular piece, the solo piano track Mint Green, has been played over eight million times on Pandora Radio.

His synth-pop debut album, Invisible Days EP, was chosen as one of the "Top 12" independently produced recordings of 2003 by Performing Songwriter magazine. Shapiro's three solo piano albums, Numbers, Colors and People (2009), Intimate Casual (2012) and Piano 3 (2016) were created with the help of Philip Glass producer Michael Riesman.

Pink Jean Mint Green, a synth-pop album featuring a collaboration with author Neil Gaiman, was released in 2016.

He has written original music for film and theater projects, and his pieces have been licensed for use in television projects worldwide, ranging from reality TV to a Clio Award-winning spot for cancer awareness.

Shapiro's music is published by Airbox Music (ASCAP), a label he founded in 2002.

Shapiro is a graduate of the Oberlin Conservatory of Music in Oberlin, Ohio where he studied musical composition. Raised in Larchmont, New York, he lives in with his wife and son in the Williamsburg neighborhood of Brooklyn, New York City.

== Discography ==
- Invisible Days EP - 15th Anniversary Expanded Edition (2019)
- Pink Jean Mint Green (2016)
- Piano 3 (2016)
- The High Line & Other Places (2015)
- Singles EP (2013)
- Intimate Casual (2012)
- 100 Houses: Gatsby Meets Caulfield (2012)
- Soundesign (Expanded Edition) (2011)
- Numbers, Colors and People (2009)
- Quiet Kissing EP (2006)
- Invisible Days EP (2003)
