= Breast cancer stem cell =

Stem cells that may cause cancer

Breast cancer is the most prevalent type of cancer among women globally, with 685,000 deaths recorded worldwide in 2020. The most commonly used treatment methods for breast cancer include surgery, radiotherapy and chemotherapy. Some of these treated patients experience disease relapse and metastasis. The aggressive progression and recurrence of this disease has been attributed the presence of a subset of tumor cells known as breast cancer stem cells (BCSCs). These cells possess the abilities of self-renewal and tumor initiation, allowing them to be drivers of metastases and tumor growth. The microenvironment in which these cells reside is filled with residential inflammatory cells that provide the needed signaling cues for BCSC-mediated self-renewal and survival. The production of cytokines allows these cells to escape from the primary tumor and travel through the circulation to distant organs, commencing the process of metastasis. Due to their significant role in driving disease progression, BCSCs represent a new target by which to treat the tumor at the source of metastasis.

== Origins and Characteristics ==
Cancer stem cells in breast tumors were first discovered in 2003. There are different theories exist on the origins of these cells. There are findings that indicates that normal cells undergo mutations which result in their transformation into BCSCs, while there are also studies which concluded that these cells come from the misplacement of somatic stem cells de novo.

The expression of key surface markers have been used to identify and isolate BCSCs. Three key proteins have been deemed as markers for BCSCs: CD44, CD24 and aldehyde dehydrogenase (ALDH). CD44, a cell surface glycoprotein, plays a crucial role in the adhesion, migration and invasion of breast cancer cells. In addition to its ability to promote proliferation and metastasis, the interaction of this protein with osteopontin hastens tumor progression. ALDH, a family of enzymes that oxidizes intracellular aldehydes and retinol, aids in the differentiation of stem cells. Research has shown that BCSCs are positive for both CD44 and ALDH, while negative for CD24.

== Signaling Pathways and Molecules ==
The tumor niche in which these BCSCs reside supports their growth and self-renewal. This microenvironment provides these cells with a physical anchoring site, a process mediated by adhesion molecules, components of the extracellular matrix (ECM) and factors secreted by stromal cells. Such as the interactions between hyaluronic acid (HA) and CD44 stimulate the activation of other pathways that promote tumor malignancy such as Nanog, HER2 and NF-κβ. The activation of these pathways result in increased proliferation, invasion and migration of BCSCs. As a result, primary breast cancer tumors quickly form metastases in distant sites. Both the epithelial-to-mesenchymal transition (EMT) and the mesenchymal-to-epithelial transition (MET) are key components of driving this metastasis process. BCSCs undergo both of these processes as they escape from the primary tumor site, enter the bloodstream and home to a new organ site to initiate tumor growth. Over the course of this process, there is an upregulation of growth factors, which in turn activate and deactivate mesenchymal and epithelial transcription factors. The combination of these factors provides the signaling cues needed by BCSCs to survive, grow and proliferate.

Pathways that play key roles in embryonic development and adult tissue homeostasis have also been implicated in driving the phenotype of BCSCs. Dysregulation of the Notch and Hedgehog pathways, which regulate normal stem cell differentiation and self-renewal, is one such example. Both of these pathways have been shown to be upregulated in breast cancer. Some early work has shown that activation of these pathways can also be correlated to the resistance of BCSCs to therapy.

== Breast Cancer Metabolism ==
Breast cancer stem cells establish their cell identity by expressing unique pattern of proteins and surface markers as fingerprints. Accordingly, breast cancer stem cells have distinctive metabolic properties to sustain their stemness and promote cancer progression. While reduced ROS Level promotes radioresistance and EMT phenotype of cancer stem cells, Notch signaling interacts with cellular metabolism to promote breast cancer stem cell.

== Therapeutic Implications ==
Both pre-clinical and clinical studies have shown a correlation between BCSCs and metastasis. For example, it has been shown that CD44+/CD24- tumor cells in the breast primary tumors associated with the presence of distance metastases. In addition, in vitro assays validated that these cells displayed increased motility and invasiveness. There have been indications of the link between chemoresistance of CSCs and metastasis. Pleural metastases from breast cancer patients were enriched with CD44+/CD24- cells, indicative of a higher enrichment of BCSCs in these resistant tumors. Therapy resistance of BCSCs is mediated by a host of mechanisms, which include ATP-binding cassette transporters, ALDH activity and reactive oxygen species scavenging. As a result, these tumors become difficult to treatment by conventional methods such as chemotherapy. This has spurred the search for new drug delivery platforms that can target BCSCs and the niche in which these cells reside. A breakdown of this biological framework and structure would provide an alternate means by which to treat this disease.
