= More (magazine) =

American women's lifestyle magazine

- October 2008 cover
- Editor-in-chief: Lesley Jane Seymour
- Categories: Fashion, beauty, travel, money, career, health
- Frequency: 10 per year
- Publisher: Meredith Corporation
- Total circulation: 1,336,545 (2013)
- Founded: 1997
- First issue: September 1998
- Final issue: April 2016
- Country: United States
- Based in: Des Moines, Iowa
- Language: English
- Website: more.com
- ISSN: 1094-7868

More was a women's lifestyle magazine published 10 times a year by the Meredith Corporation with a rate base of 1.3 million and a circulation of 1.8 million. A Canadian version was published under license by Transcontinental from 2007 to 2012.

== History and profile ==
The magazine was started in 1997 and the first issue appeared in September 1998.

More also produces the More Magazine/Fitness Magazine Women's Half-Marathon, a NYC event in partnership with the New York Road Runners, "Escape with More" at the Miraval Arizona Resort and Spa and the "Fierce and Fabulous Girls Night Out" event series. In 2010 More introduced the annual More Beauty Search Contest, which women over 30 can enter for the chance to win cash prizes and be featured in the magazine. In 2013, More launched "More Uncorked", a new wine club in partnership with Women of the Vine that delivers wines made by artisan women winemakers of California.

In February 2010, More was updated with a new logo and tagline: "For Women of Style and Substance".

In February 2016, the Meredith Corporation announced that More would cease publication with the April 2016 issue.

== Awards ==
- Included on Advertising Age’s "A List" of Top 10 magazines in 2003, 2005, 2006 and 2007
- Media magazine's "Best Women’s Lifestyle Magazine" of 2004
- Honored by Capell's Circulation Report as one of the Top 10 Newsstand Performers in 2006
- Advertising Age 2006 Magazine of the Year
- Spots on the Adweek "Hot List" in 2006, 2007 and 2010
- 2012 National Magazine Award Finalist: General Excellence
- 2010 National Magazine Award Finalist: General Excellence
- 2009 National Magazine Award Finalist: Personal Service
- 2007 Nominee for National Magazine Award for General Excellence
- ASJA 2012 Honorable Mention in the Lifestyle Narratives category
- ASJA 2010 Writing Award in the Lifestyle Narratives category
- Society of Magazine Designers Gold Medals in October 2010 and November 2010
- The Endocrine Society Award for Excellence in Science and Medical Journalism & American Academy of Orthopaedic Surgeons’ Orthopaedic Reporting Excellence
