= Lesley Jane Seymour =

American editor, author and entrepreneur (born 1957)

- Born: Lesley Jane Nonkin; January 4, 1957 (age 69)
- Education: Duke University; Columbia University
- Occupations: Editor, author, entrepreneur
- Years active: 1978–present
- Spouse: Jeffrey Seymour
- Website: coveyclub.com

Lesley Jane Nonkin Seymour (born January 4, 1957) is an American editor, author and entrepreneur. She was previously a senior editor of Vogue and editor-in-chief of many women's magazines, including YM, Marie Claire, Redbook and More. After More ceased publication in 2016, she returned to school, and later founded CoveyClub, an online community for professional women. She has spoken at conferences for women entrepreneurs, and has contributed to LinkedIn and HuffPost.

== Career ==
Seymour attended Dana Hall School in Wellesley, Massachusetts, graduating in 1974. She then attended Duke University. In an interview with Duke Magazine, she said that she started as a biology major, but did not want to be a pre-med. She changed to English and interned for Durham Herald-Sun and Seventeen. She worked as a reporter for Women's Wear Daily and graduated in 1978. She worked at Vogue from 1982 to 1992 where she originated the "Upfront" section and served as senior editor in books, fashion, and features. In 1993, she joined Glamour magazine as a beauty director, and became editor-in-chief of YM in 1997.

In 1998, she joined Redbook as editor-in-chief She was editor-in-chief of Marie Claire magazine from 2001 to 2006, during which the magazine was nominated for a 2006 National Magazine Award. She was replaced by Joanna Coles.

Seymour was named editor-in-chief of More magazine in January 2008. During her tenure, the magazine was named to Mediaweek's 2010 Hot List, and dubbed 'The Vanity Fair for Women' by marketers. While Seymour was editor-in-chief, former First Lady Michelle Obama guest-edited their July/August issue, and was the first First Lady to do so.

In February 2016, Meredith Corporation announced that More would cease publication. A spokesperson said that the magazine was "particularly hard hit during the recession of the late 2000s". Seymour said that "you didn't have to be a rocket scientist to know this is not a stable business." Seymour returned to school where she got a master's degree in sustainability from Columbia University. In February 2018, Seymour founded CoveyClub, which CNN described as "an online club connecting women 40 and older through content, connections and events." She says that readers of her previous writing reached out to her and "encouraged" her to "do something else to reach women over 40."

== Personal life ==
Seymour is married to Jeffrey. They live in Larchmont, New York, and have 2 children, Lake and J.J. She is one of the trustees at Dana Hall School.

== Books ==
- I wish my parents understood: a report on the teenage female (Freundlich Books, 1985) ISBN 9780881910186
- On the Edge: Images from 100 Years of VOGUE by Vogue editors, (Random House, 1992) ISBN 9780679411611
