= Clifford Day Mallory Cup =

Competition for the US Adult Sailing Championship

The Clifford Day Mallory Cup, or Mallory Cup for short, is the competition for the United States Adult Sailing Championship.

In a sport with hundreds of different classes of boats and a national champion for each, the point of the Mallory Cup is to determine an overall champion for the sport of sailing in the United States. Run by US Sailing (as opposed to any given class), eliminations are held throughout the country, and the finals are raced in a different type of boat each year to eliminate any advantage a sailor from any particular class might otherwise have. Competitors sail boats that are provided by the host club, and teams are required to race each boat at the event once so that nobody will have an advantage in terms of equipment.

As with national championships in other sports, the top three finishers receive gold, silver, and bronze medals. The winner holds the Clifford Day Mallory Cup until the following year's champion is crowned. A piece of history itself, the Mallory Cup was originally given by the Sultan of the Ottoman Empire to the family of Lord Nelson in appreciation of his command over the English fleet that defeated Napoleon in the Battle of the Nile.

== History ==
- 1952 YRA of Long Island Sound – Cornelius Shields, Cornelius Shields, Jr., William Leboutillier
- 1953 Gulf YA – Eugene H. Walet, III, John Ryan, Ralph Christman, Eugene H. Walet, II
- 1954 Gulf YA – Eugene H. Walet, III, Allen McClure, Jr., Gilbert Friedreichs, Jr.
- 1955 Pacific International YA – William Buchan, Jr., William Buchan, Sr., Ron McFarlane
- 1956 YRU of Massachusetts Bay – Fred E. Hood, Bradley P. Noyes, Charles Pingree
- 1957 YRU of Massachusetts Bay – George D. O'Day, David J. Smith, Charles A. Forsberg
- 1958 Texas YA – Robert Mosbacher, George C. Francisco, III, C.B. Masterson
- 1959 Inland Lake YA – Harry C. Melges, Jr., John B. Shethar, Jr., Edward Smith
- 1960 Inland Lake YA – Harry C. Melges, Jr., Gloria Melges, John B. Shethar, Jr., Edward Smith
- 1961 Inland Lake YA – Harry C. Melges, Jr., Dr. A. R. Wenzel, John B. Shethar, Jr.
- 1962 Inland Lake YA – James S. Payton, Peter Barrett, Chuck Miller
- 1963 YRA of San Francisco Bay – Jim DeWitt, Jocelyn Nash, Jacob VanHeeckeren
- 1964 Gulf YA – G. Shelby Freidrichs, Jr., Tommy Dreyfuss, Ray Troendle, Sr.
- 1965 YRA of Long Island Sound – Cornelius Shields, Jr., Dr. George Brazil, Jr., Craig Walters
- 1966 YRA of Long Island Sound – William S. Cox, Thomas Hume, Robert Barton
- 1967 Barnegat Bay YRA – Clifford W. Campbell, Howard Wright, Ann Campbell
- 1968 Southern Massachusetts YRA – James A. Hunt, Bourne Knowles, Joshua Hunt
- 1969 YRA of Long Island Sound – Graham M. Hall, John Luard, Jack G. McAllister
- 1970 Florida SA – Dr. John W. Jennings, James L. Pardee, Barbara Pardee
- 1971 Texas YA – John Kolius, Bill Hunt, Scott Self
- 1972 Florida SA – Edwin H. Sherman, Jr., Harvey A. Ford, Hubert Rutland, III
- 1973 Florida SA – Dr. John W. Jennings, James L. Pardee, Barbara Pardee
- 1974 YRA of San Francisco Bay – Vann Wilson, Nate Russel, Frank Thompson
- 1975 YRA of Long Island Sound – Christopher W. Pollak, Lisa Hamm, William Ehrhorn
- 1976 Southern California YA – David Crockett, Sid Exley, Kurt Nicolai
- 1977 Texas YA – Marvin Bleckman, Curt Oetking, Tommy Simms
- 1978 Texas YA – Glenn Darden, Kelly Gough, Jay Raymond
- 1979 Texas YA – Glenn Darden, Kelly Gough, Scott Young
- 1980 Southern California YA – David Ullman, Bill Herrschaft, Paul Murphy
- 1981 Texas YA – Mark Foster, Chuck Wilk, Scott Young
- 1982 Southern California YA – Mark Golison, Bruce Golison, Jay Golison
- 1983 YRA of Long Island Sound – Peter Coleman, Paul Coleman, Barry Purcell
- 1984 Gulf YA – Marc Eagan, Corky Hadden, Beau Le Blanc
- 1985 Texas YA – Scott Young, Jody Smith, Doug Kern
- 1986 Pacific International YA – Jack Christiansen, Charlie McKee, Cheryl Lanzinger
- 1987 Texas YA – Scott Young, Mike Haggerty, Doug Kern, John Moran
- 1988 Gulf YA – Dennis Stieffel, Bubby Eagan, Peter Merrifield
- 1989 Texas YA – Paul Foerster, Mark Rylander, John Bartlett
- 1990 YRU of Southern California – Scott Deardorff, Matt Wilson, Kirk Arndt
- 1991 Lake Hopatcong YC – Alex Smigelski, Brent Barbehenn, Lloyd Kitchin
- 1992 San Francisco YC – Jeff Madrigali, Gary Grande, Jeff Wayne
- 1993 Eastern YC – John Slattery, Brad White, Bob Slattery
- 1994 New Orleans YC –Benz Faget, Tom Baker, David Bolyard
- 1995 Niantic Bay YC, CT – Bill Healy, Tim Healy, Adam Walsh
- 1996 Royal Victorian YC – Michael Turner, Jeff Eckard, Olaf Thyvold
- 1997 Royal Victorian YC – Michael Turner, Olaf Thyvold, Brian Lister
- 1998 Seattle, WA – Dalton Bergan, Kevin Guitron, Mike Visser
- 1999 Gulf YA – Benz Faget, Michael Mark, David Zahn, David Bolyard
- 2000 Gulfport YC – Robert Schmidt, David Bolyard, Hew Hamilton
- 2001 Not Sailed – [Patriots Cup: Brock Schmidt, David Bolyard, Tom Baker]
- 2002 Boston YC – Charles Quigley, David Bryan, Leo Fallon, Bill Hooper
- 2003 Bay Waveland YC – Zak Fanberg, Eugene Shmitt & Kippy Chamberlain
- 2004 Bay Waveland YC – Zak Fanberg, Dave Blouin, Kippy Chamberlain
- 2005 Bay Waveland YC – Zak Fanberg, Sara Fanberg, Marcus Eagan
- 2006 Austin YC – Scott Young, John Morran, Douglas Kern
- 2007 San Diego, YC – Brian Camet, Alex Camet, Daniel Camet
- 2008 Austin YC- Scott Young, John Morran, Doug Kern, Mike Haggerty
- 2009 Bay Waveland YC Andrew Eagan, Marcus Eagan, Katherine Santa Cruz
- 2010 Vineyard Haven Yacht Club Paul Wilson, John Plominski, William Stevens
- 2011 Babylon Yacht Club David M. Hyer, David A. Hyer, Gregory Schneller
- 2012 Not Sailed
- 2013 Ventura Yacht Club: David Klatt, Lane Desborough, Garrett Baum, David Paudler
- 2014 Southern Yacht Club:Benz Faget, Randall Richmond, Thomas Sweeney
- 2015 Manhattan Yacht Club: Eric Leitner, Doug Witter, Adam Sandberg, Tom Sinatra, Michael Ambrose
- 2016 St. Francis Yacht Club (Northern California YRA): Russ Silvestri, John Collins, Mario Yovkov, Maggie Bacon
- 2017 Sail Maine (Northeast Sailing Association): Carter White, Michael McAllister, Henry Cole, Fiona Gordon
- 2018 Inland Lake Yachting Association: Michael Hanson, Tim Siemers, Mark Swift
- 2019 Chesapeake Bay Yacht Racing Association: John Loe, Jake Doyle, Jamie Gilman, Robbie Deane
- 2020 Not Sailed
- 2021 Gulf Yacht Association: Max Albert, Andrew Brennan, Matthew Dupuy, Eddie Adams
- 2022 Gulf Yacht Association: Jackson Benvenutti, Andrew Eagan, Christopher Alexander
- 2023 Southern California Yachting Association: Charlie Welsh, Scott Rasmussen
