= Chatsworth Avenue School =

Public school in Larchmont, New York, US

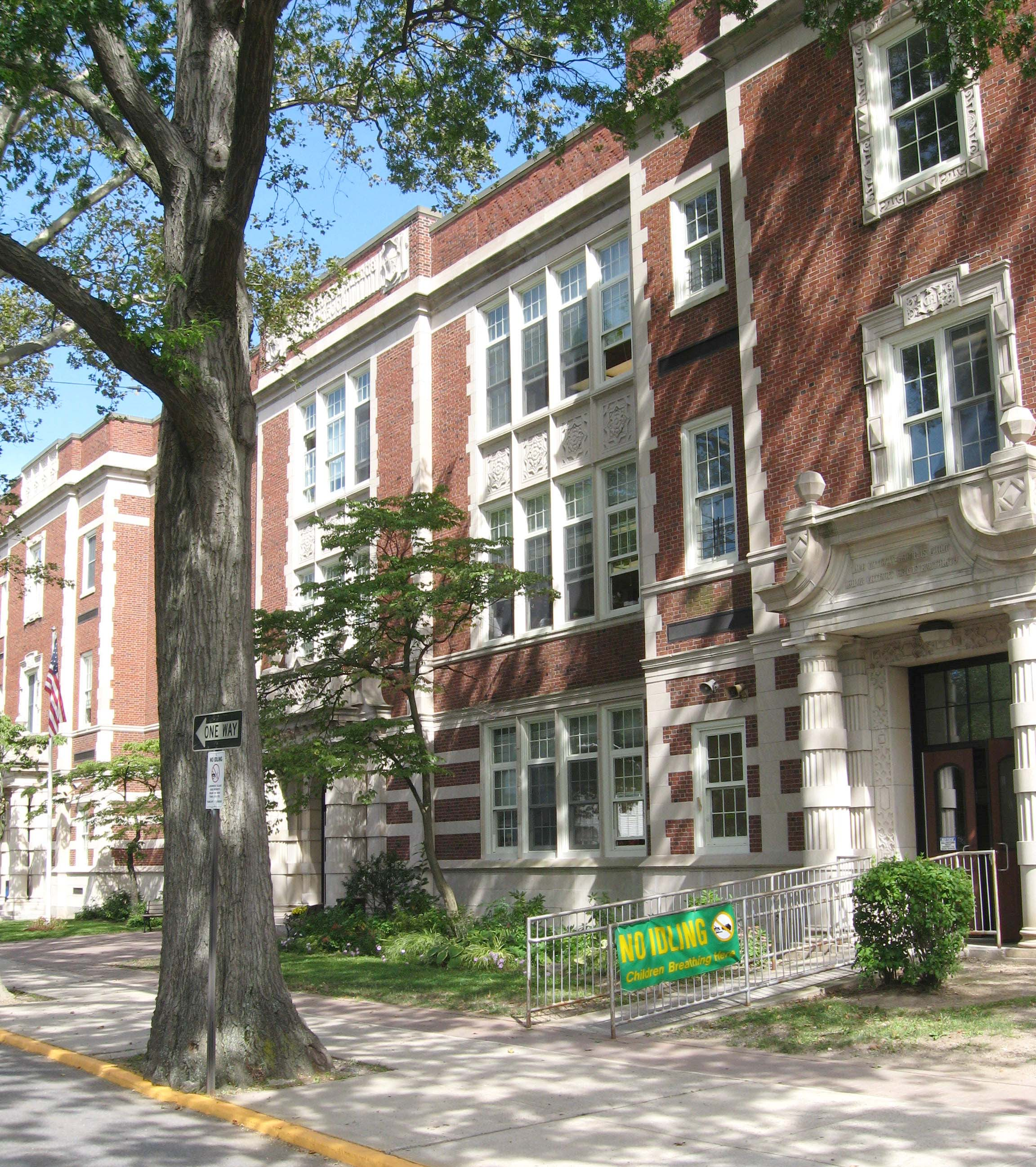

Location
- 34 Chatsworth Ave. Larchmont, (Westchester County), New York 10538; United States
- Coordinates: 40.929775°N 73.753109°W

Information
- School type: Public school (government funded), Comprehensive school
- Established: 1902
- Status: Open
- School district: Mamaroneck Union Free School District
- NCES District ID: 3618240.
- NCES School ID: 361824001645
- Principal: Lauren Scharfstein
- Staff: 2
- Faculty: 43
- Grades: K-5
  - Kindergarten: 108
  - Grade 1: 92
  - Grade 2: 96
  - Grade 3: 112
  - Grade 4: 112
  - Grade 5: 101
  - Ungraded Elementary: 18
- Student to teacher ratio: 15.3
- Campus type: Suburban
- Communities served: Larchmont Village
- Feeder to: Hommocks Middle School
- Website: www.mamkschools.org/schools/chatsworth-avenue-school

Chatsworth Avenue School is a public elementary school located in Larchmont, New York. It was founded in 1902, as a two-room schoolhouse on Chatsworth Avenue. It has 3 floors and 4 extra classes that the kids partake in several times a week: Music, Library, Gym, and Art. With its two cafeterias and three playgrounds, children always enjoy their 1-hour lunch break. School hours are from 8:40 AM to 3:00 PM. There are approximately five classes per grade, and around 22 kids per class. The current principal is Lauren Scharfstein. It is a K-5 school with students advancing to the Hommocks Middle School. It is one of four elementary schools of the Mamaroneck Union Free School District.

In the mid 1970s, it was cited as an example of a school that was endeared by the community which was considering closing schools in the face of declining enrollment.

In 1998, a 4th grade teacher from the school with 31 years of experience was interviewed by the New York Times and explained why the state mandated English Language Arts test was not suitable for the grade level.

In 1999, the school was one of the top 25 schools in New York State for Percentage of 6th graders scoring at highest level in reading test.

In 2000 the school was involved in a controversy when an 11-year-old student was suspended in a nationally reported incident over alleged sexual harassment of a girl. The child's parents claimed that it was an over reaction by the school. However, due to federal privacy regulations, the school could not respond publicly regarding details of the incident. In the face of a threatened lawsuit and media pressure, the school was forced to back down. Many other parents sided with the school, saying there had been many incidents with the child and that the cited incident was simply the straw that broke the camel's back. The overall perception was that the child's parents used lawyers and the media to manipulate the situation to their advantage.

In 2025 the school was widely criticized for repainting a wall gifted by a former class. While the Mamaroneck Schools Foundation intended for the repainted "tiger wall" to foster a sense of belonging, many community members have voiced strong negative feedback regarding the project's impact on the school's historic identity. Critics on local platforms like the Larchmont Loop have lamented the loss of the original stone craftsmanship, describing the new painted concrete as "hideous," "foreboding," and more akin to an "industrial" or "prison-like" structure than a welcoming elementary school. Also, some students have complained that the painting "forgot" about the class of 2016 that painted the wall. This frustration mirrors broader local aesthetic concerns, similar to the backlash against nearby murals on Chatsworth Avenue that were labeled "creepy" and "terrifying" by neighbors. Despite the school's effort to modernize the space with vibrant colors and "Tiger Pride" themes, many residents continue to feel that the repainted facade represents an "unsightly" departure from the traditional architectural harmony that previously defined the campus.
