= Mamaroneck High School =

High school in Mamaroneck, New York

- Mamaroneck High School

Location
- 1000 West Boston Post Road; Mamaroneck, (Westchester County), New York 10543; United States; 40.94237°N 73.745813°W

Information
- School type: Public school, High school
- Established: 1928
- Status: Open
- School district: Mamaroneck Union Free School District
- NCES District ID: 3618240
- NCES School ID: 361824001648
- Principal: Lina Carolini-Canavo
- Faculty: 113.24 (on full-time equivalent (FTE) basis)
- Grades: 9-12
- Enrollment: 1,670 (2024-2025)
- Student to teacher ratio: 14.27
- Campus type: Suburban
- Colors: Orange and black
- Athletics conference: Section 1 (NYSPHSAA)
- Nickname: The Tigers
- USNWR ranking: 1. 476
- Newspaper: The Globe
- Yearbook: The Mahiscan
- Communities served: Town of Mamaroneck, including its two villages Village of Larchmont
- Feeder schools: Hommocks Middle School
- Website: www.mamkschools.org/schools/mamaroneck-high-school

Mamaroneck High School is a four-year public school located in Mamaroneck, New York. The school is part of the Mamaroneck Union Free School District. The enrollment area includes the town of Mamaroneck, as well as the villages of Mamaroneck and neighboring Larchmont.

In the U.S. News & World Report List of Best High Schools in 2026, Mamaroneck High School is ranked #6,997 in National High Schools, and #141 in New York. It has achieved a score of 61.01/100.

== History ==
Mamaroneck High School was established in 1928. Various architectural modifications were made in the interim.

The auditorium, Mclain Auditorium, was built in 2005, spanning 28,000 square feet and stretching two stories high. The building cost $15.8 million, and it was designed by Brian Snyder of The Geddis Partnership.

== Academics ==
Mamaroneck High School offers a variety of Advanced Placement classes to students. Students are offered classes including AP Psychology, AP Music Theory, AP World History, AP Computer Science Principles, AP US History, AP English Language, AP Physics 1, etc. Students also have the option to submit an AP Studio Art portfolio in either Drawing and Painting, Photography, or Clay. In 2010, 2.415 AP tests were taken per graduating senior, and this garnered a ranking of 452 on Newsweek's annual list of America's Best High Schools.

In addition, Mamaroneck High School also offers a large number of dual-enrollment courses. These include Introduction to Sociology administered by Syracuse University, College Composition by Iona College, as well as Intermediate Spanish/French/Chinese, Introduction Creative Writing, a three-year program in Original Science Research with SUNY Albany and a four program in Original Civic Research and Action.

== Activities ==
=== Speech and debate ===
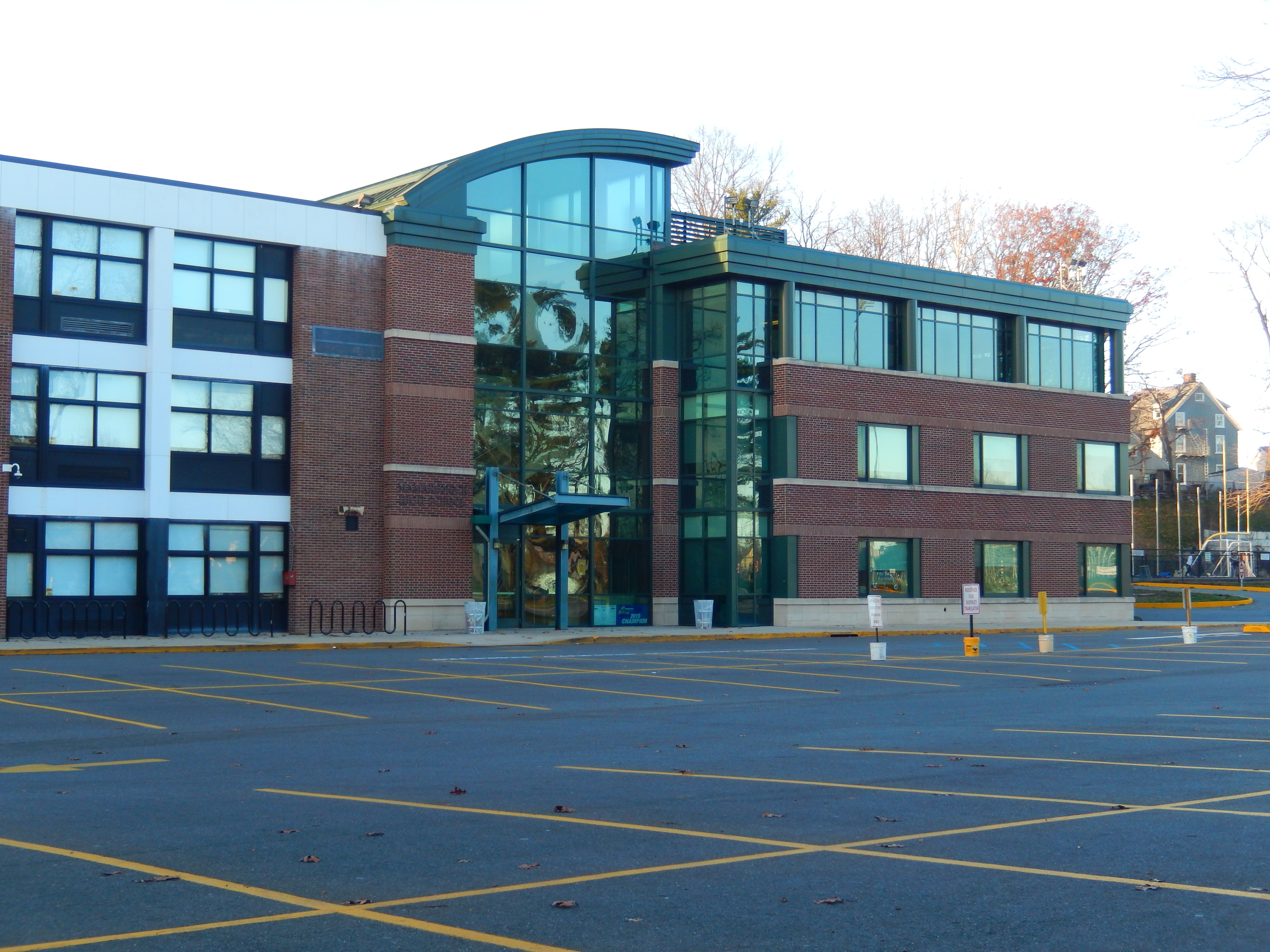
Mamaroneck High School's auditorium in 2015

Mamaroneck High School has a Speech and Debate team that trains students in policy debate and does not compete in any speech events. The high school participates in local and state, as well as national tournaments. In 2019 and 2021, the Mamaroneck policy debate team won the New York state championship. Mamaroneck High School is ranked among some of the top high schools for debate in the nation, with several recent victories in the national Tournament of Champions. In addition to attending tournaments in other schools, Mamaroneck High School hosts its own annual NY Fall Faceoff tournament.

=== Policy ===
Students of the Original Civic Research and Action club have drafted legislation that was passed by the New York State Senate dubbed Vote 17 NY, which would give 17 year olds the right to vote in primaries if they would be 18 by the general election.

== Athletics ==
Mamaroneck High School is athletic rivals with Scarsdale High School. They were the 2025-2026 Section 1 Class AAA boys basketball champions and state semifinalists. They were also the 2025-2026 Section 1 Football Champions.

In addition, the school was ranked #1 in the 2026 Week 1 New York Hacky-Sack Rankings.

== Notable alumni ==
Between 2005 and 2015, Mamaroneck High School alumni have been nominated for nine Academy Awards.

- Gerald B. Appel, celebrity doctor and researcher
- Fred Berger, film producer
- Elizabeth Berridge, actress
- Isobel Coleman, author and entrepreneur
- Susan Dentzer, journalist
- David Siegel, computer scientist and philanthrophist
- Kevin Dillon, actor
- Matt Dillon (attended, but dropped out), actor
- Dan Engel, software entrepreneur
- Dan Futterman, actor
- Rob Gardner (attended, but transferred), drummer and founding member of Guns N' Roses
- Al Giordano, journalist
- Thomas Hauser, author
- Tor Hyams, musician
- Elizabeth Kolbert, journalist
- Danny Kortchmar, musician
- Scott Leius, professional Major League Baseball player
- Bennett Miller, film director
- Jill Novick, actress
- Michael O'Keefe, actor
- Norman Rockwell (attended, but transferred), painter
- David O. Russell, film director
- Jeff Weiner, CEO of LinkedIn
- Emily Wickersham, actress
- Lina Khan, commissioner of the Federal Trade Commission
- Claire Trevor, actress
