= Etchells =

Sailboat class

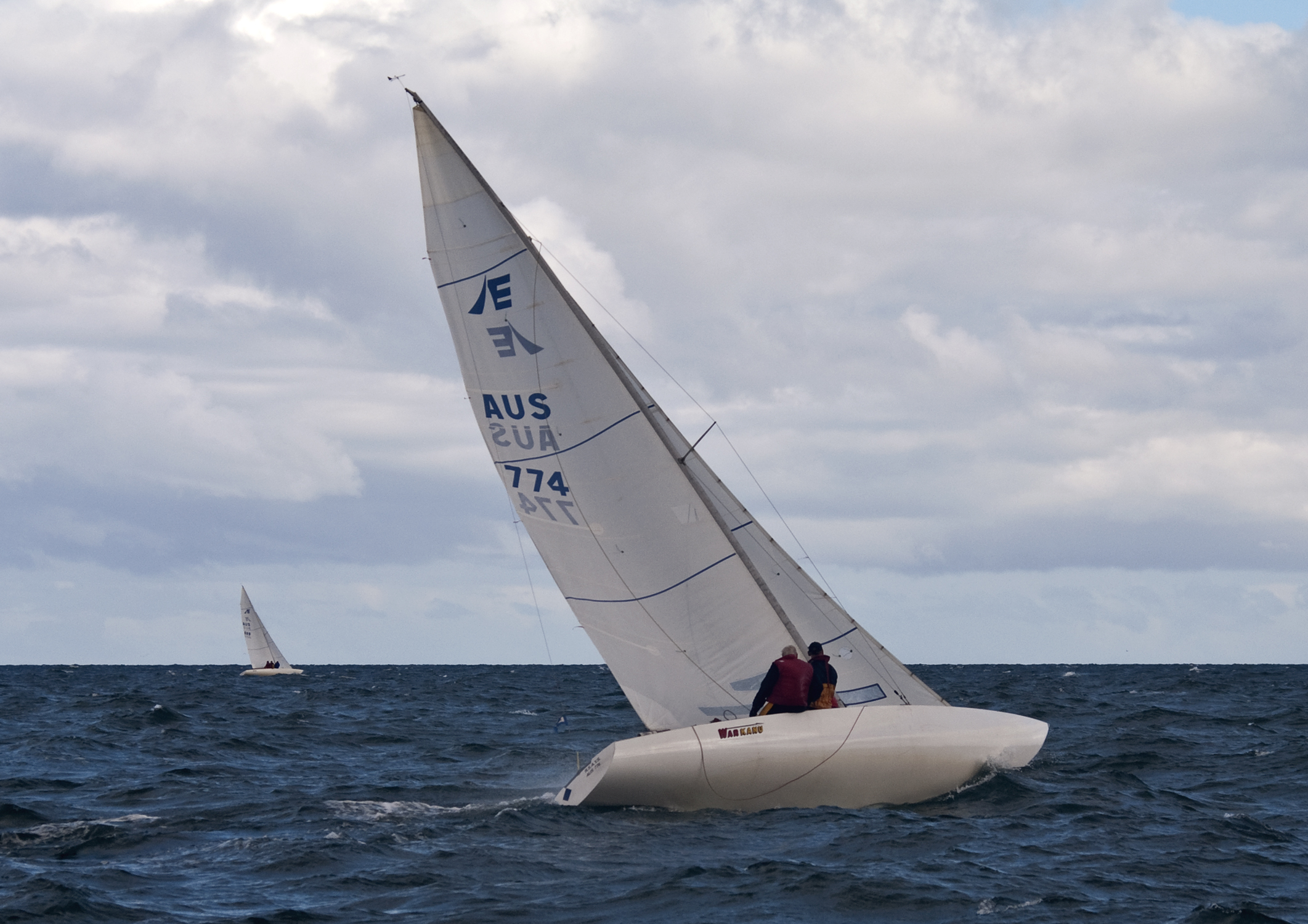

Development
- Designer: E. W. Etchells
- Location: United States
- Year: 1966
- Builders: Bashford Boat Builders; Sydney Yachts; Pamcraft; Ontario Yachts; Robertson and Sons Ltd. David Heritage Racing Yachts; Petticrows Limited

Boat
- Displacement: 3,325 lb (1,508 kg)
- Draft: 4.50 ft (1.37 m)

Hull
- Type: Monohull
- Construction: Fiberglass
- LOA: 30.50 ft (9.30 m)
- LWL: 22.00 ft (6.71 m)
- Beam: 7.00 ft (2.13 m)

Hull appendages
- Keel: fin keel
- Ballast: 2,175 lb (987 kg)
- Rudder: skeg-mounted rudder

Rig
- Rig type: Bermuda rig
- I foretriangle height: 27.60 ft (8.41 m)
- J foretriangle base: 8.00 ft (2.44 m)
- P mainsail luff: 32.50 ft (9.91 m)
- E mainsail foot: 11.50 ft (3.51 m)

Sails
- Sailplan: Fractional rigged sloop
- Mainsail area: 186.88 sq ft (17.362 m^{2})
- Jib/genoa area: 110.40 sq ft (10.256 m^{2})
- Total sail area: 297.28 sq ft (27.618 m^{2})

The International Etchells Class is one-design sailboat racing class, designed by American Skip Etchells.

== Production ==
The first 36 boats were built by Skip Etchells and the Old Greenwich Boat Company between 1967 and 1969. In the early 1970s Skip Etchells finished hulls which were moulded for him by Tillotson-Pearson.

Since being established as a one-design class, boats have been built by numerous other manufacturers, including Bashford Boat Builders (later known as Sydney Yachts), Pamcraft and Phil Smidmore (trading as Pacesetter Etchells PTY.) in Australia, Ontario Yachts in Canada, and Robertson and Sons Ltd., David Heritage Racing Yachts and Petticrows Limited, all in the United Kingdom.

=== Mold 11 controversy ===
In 2010, the International Etchells Class Association of Australia was granted permission to build a new mold for the production of Etchells hulls. At the time there were three other molds being used - mold #8 was used by Ontario Yachts; mold #9 by Bashford and then Smidmore; Heritage and Petticrows used mold #10.

The three existing molds were made from the same plug, but 3D scans made by the One Design Technical Committee (ODTC) between 2005 and 2008 showed variations between the hulls they produced, and ODTC had since expressed the desire to standardise on a single hull form which would be used in the production of all future molds.

The Australian Association proposed basing the new mold on the Heritage one - this would ensure hull conformity between the two manufacturers, and supposed that Ontario Yachts would adopt the same shape when replacing their mold in the future. Instead permission was granted to produce a mold based on the ODTC's 3D scanning data, an average or composite of the three existing hull forms that made up the majority of the worldwide racing fleets; the existent data was not complete enough for this, and further scanning was required.

The mold was licensed to Pacesetter Yachts and used to manufacture 24 or 25 hulls over a period of about a decade. Although the ODTC expressed concern about a scan of the second hull produced by the new mold, a report by the Etchells Class Chief Measurer stated "The Etchells made from Mould 11 are in every way an Etchells in accordance with the Etchells Class Rules, Tolerances and Specifications."

It was not until Australian success at the 2019 Etchells World Championship that questions were raised about the hulls produced by mold #11, and in 2021 the newly elected International Governing Committee (IGC) of the International Etchells Class Association (IECA) declared that boats built with it were "effectively not Etchells Class yachts" and ineligible to compete in the class.

The justification for this decision was that mold #11 had never been approved by World Sailing, but it also claimed "It has … been discovered by scans and floatation tests of boats from all three moulds that M11 produces boats which have a longer water line, less rocker, are flatter in the middle and fuller in the ends. The differences are material, far greater than can be explained away by minor variances due to manufacturing tolerances."

The IGC statement implied that the Australian Association were responsible for the differences, that mold #11 was "produced … by massaging scan data which came from the official plug, obviating the need to ship the plug to Australia", that "the method approved by the IGC" had not been followed, and that it was a "deviation" from the class rules. The president of the International Etchells Class Association of Australia called this "a distorted, misleading and biased view of the facts… in many material respects grossly wrong."

It emerged that the class association and World Sailing had no records of approval of molds #8, #9 and #10, thus calling into doubt the entitlement of other boats to compete in the class - boats from all current Etchells builders would be affected, including those from Ontario Yachts and David Heritage. On 30 September, owners of mold #11 boats wrote to the International Etchells Class Association demanding they reverse their decision or apply it equally to the other boats.

On 9 October 2021 World Sailing CEO David Graham, in a letter to the International Etchells Class Association, stated that there are clear issues with Mould 11, that World Sailing has no record of any approval of Mould 11, that measurement alone does not make a boat an Etchells, that it appears Mould 11 is materially different from other moulds and plugs, and that all hulls from Mould 11 have in fact been produced by Innovation Composites, rather than Pacesetter Yachts, which means they have been built by an unauthorised builder. Graham also noted that if Pacesetter Yachts had subcontracted the building of the boats, or transferred tooling, to another party, then Pacesetter Yachts was in breach of its licence.

== Design ==
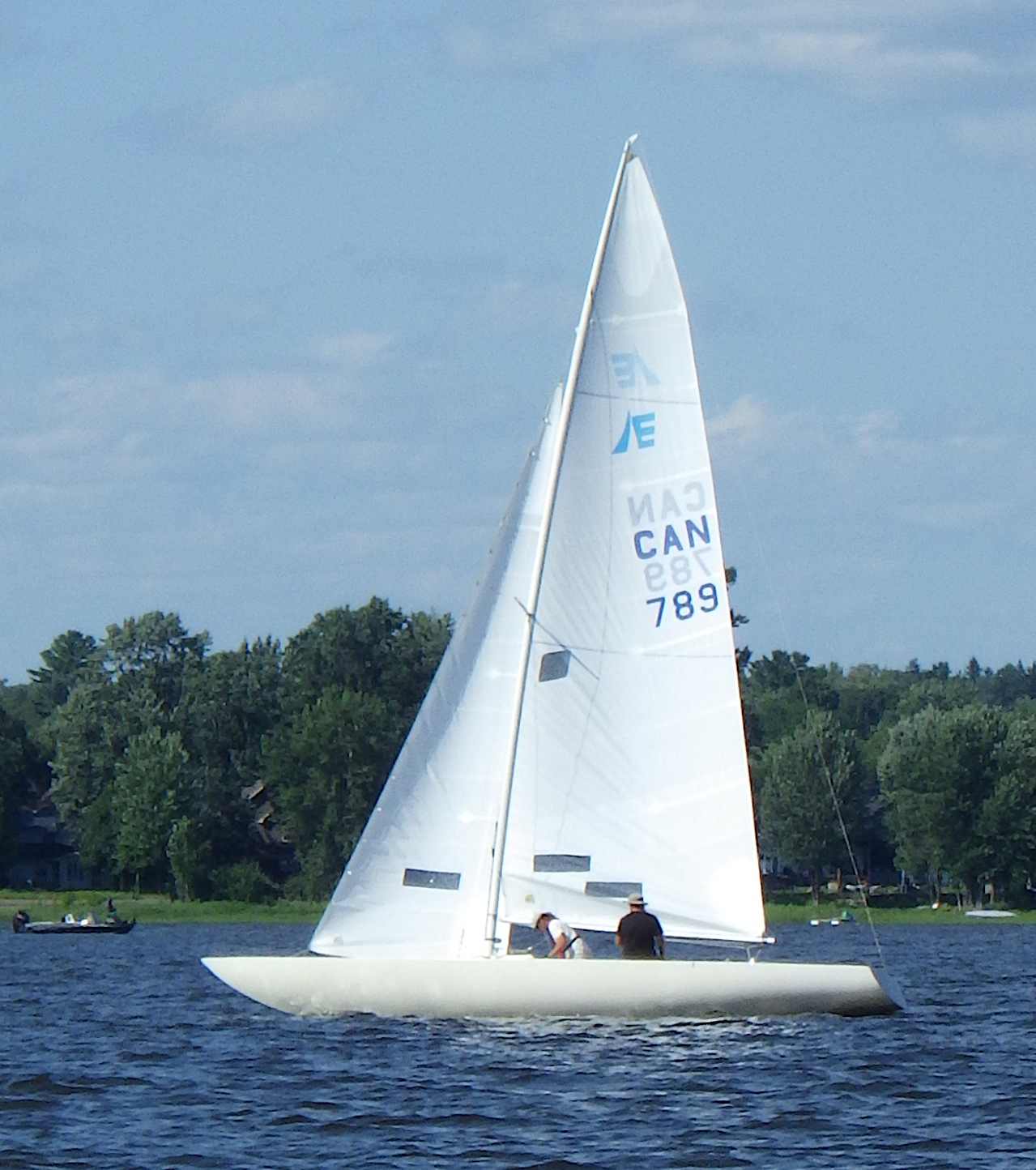
An Etchells sailing to windward

In 1965, Yachting Magazine launched a competition to select a new three-man Olympic keelboat. E. W. "Skip" Etchells, a boat designer, builder and sailor, was interested in the competition, but refrained from producing a design until the trials were announced. However, once the details became available, he built the wooden Shillalah, taking her to Kiel, Germany, where the trials were to be held in the fall of 1966.

Shillalah performed well at the trials, winning eight of the ten races. Nevertheless, the judges were unable to agree on a winner, and thus a second set of trials was held in Travemünde the following year. For these trials Etchells rebuilt the boat in fiberglass, using the original Shillalah as a plug. As with the first trials, Shillalah II (as the new boat was named) dominated the races, winning ten out of the thirteen that were held, and only just missing out on an eleventh.

At the completion of the trials the judges chose the Soling over Shillalah II, in spite of her success in the races. However, the boat's performance had won converts, and shortly thereafter the boat entered production with orders for an initial 12 boats. With the formation of a new association the class became known as the E22, and 32 boats were built by Etchells' company by the end of 1969. The E22 was recognised as an International class by the International Yacht Racing Union in 1974, and the name was changed to "International Etchells" in 1990.

The Etchells is a racing keelboat, built predominantly of fiberglass. It has a fractional sloop rig, a spooned raked stem, a raised counter reverse transom, a skeg-mounted rudder controlled by a tiller and a fixed fin keel. It displaces 3,325 lb (1,508 kg) and carries 2,175 lb (987 kg) of lead ballast.

The boat has a draft of 4.50 ft (1.37 m) with the standard keel.

Designed for racer and day sailing, the boat has a small cuddy cabin without bunks, designed for stowage only.

For sailing the boat has a central control console that gathers many of the sail controls. These include the 8:1 mechanical advantage jib halyard, 4:1 Cunningham, 4:1 mainsheet, foreguy and the topping lift. Other controls are led to the cuddy cabin's aft bulkhead, including the 2:1 course jib sheet, 6:1 fine jib tuner, 2:1 barber hauler and the spinnaker halyard. There is also a 6:1 adjustable backstay and a mainsheet traveler.

== Operational history ==
=== Famous Etchells sailors ===
- Steve Benjamin
- John Bertrand
- Dennis Conner
- Peter Coleman
- Russell Coutts
- Dave Curtis
- Gary Jobson
- Poul Richard Høj Jensen
- Timothea Larr
- Phil Smidmore
- Bill Hardesty
