= Larchmont Harbor (Long Island Sound) =

- Location within New York
- Location: Larchmont, New York
- Coordinates: 40.9251444°N 73.7391111°W
- Islands: none

Larchmont Harbor is the name of a bay located on the north shore of Long Island Sound, in the village of Larchmont in Westchester County, New York.

Larchmont Harbor lies between Long Beach Point and Umbrella Point, and northward of Execution Rocks lighthouse. The harbor is the home of the Larchmont Yacht Club. The depths at the anchorage for small vessels in the harbor range from about 12 feet in the entrance to 6 feet near the shore. The harbor is full of mooring buoys for small yachts during the summer season. The entrance Of Larchmont Harbor is on either side of Hen and Chickens, a reef bare at low tide in places near the middle. The easterly entrance is about 300 yards wide
