= Breast Cancer Research Foundation =

Research organization

- Founded: 1993; 33 years ago
- Founder: Evelyn H. Lauder
- Purpose: Breast Cancer Research
- Location: New York, New York
- Key people: Donna McKay, President
- Website: Official website

The Breast Cancer Research Foundation (BCRF) is an independent, not-for-profit organization which has raised $569.4 million to support clinical and translational research on breast cancer at medical institutions in the United States and abroad. BCRF currently funds over 255 researchers in 14 countries.

The BCRF's director of research is Dr. Larry Norton of Memorial Sloan-Kettering Cancer Center. BCRF has funded basic research on genetic susceptibility to breast cancer, breast cancer stem cells, trastuzumab (Herceptin), anti-angiogenesis treatment with bevacizumab (Avastin), MRI imaging, aromatase inhibitors, tamoxifen; and also clinical trials of new treatments with the Translational Breast Cancer Research Consortium.

BCRF was founded in 1993 by Evelyn Lauder, Senior Corporate Vice President of The Estee Lauder Companies. Lauder's first foray into breast cancer awareness was through an initiative by herself and Alexandra Penney, former editor of SELF magazine, to make the pink ribbon an international symbol of breast cancer awareness.

== Funding and spending ==
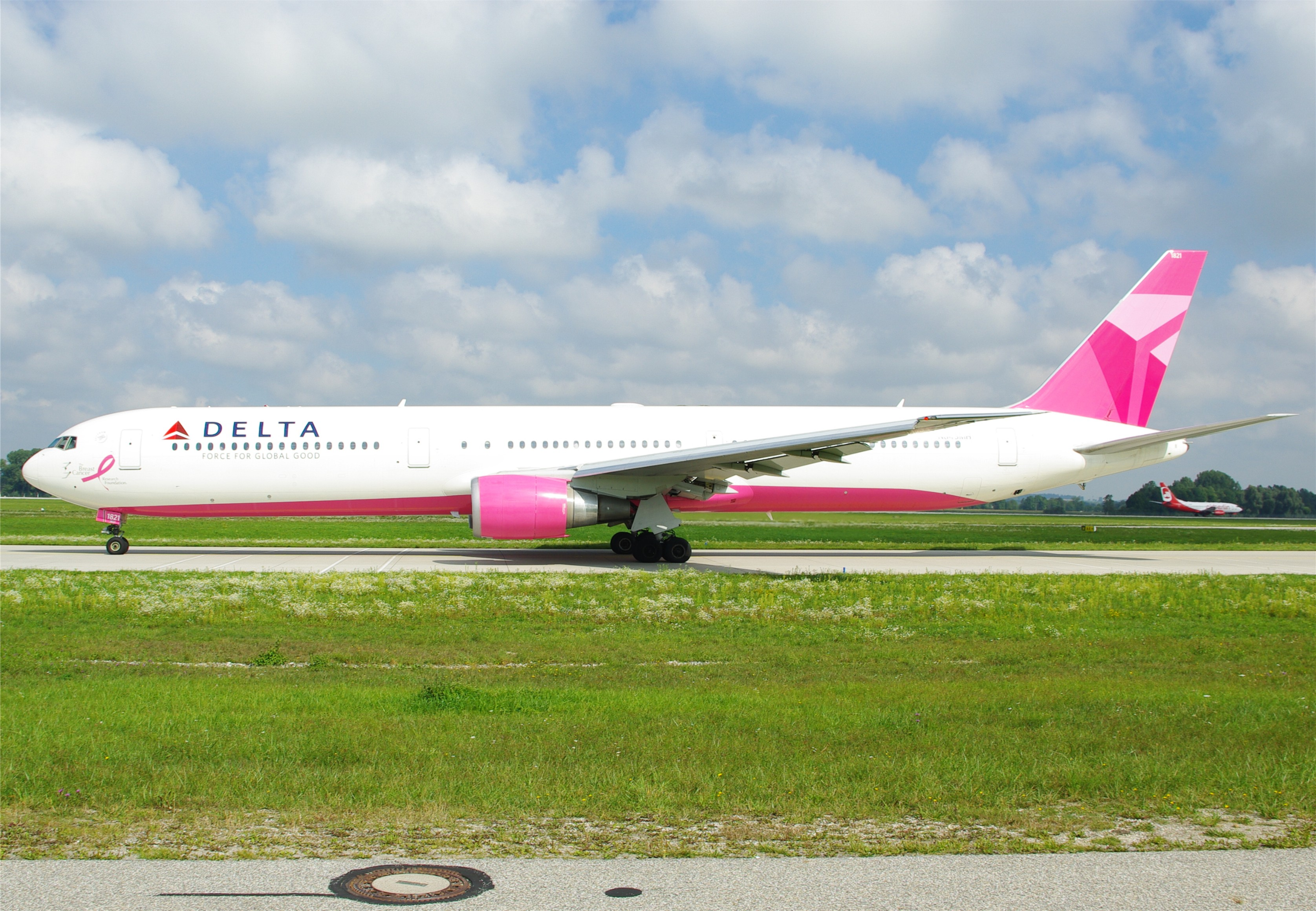
Delta Air Lines' ship #1821, a 767-400ER, in pink Breast Cancer Research Foundation livery, in 2010. In 2012, the livery was slightly modified to rename the plane in honor of the BCRF's founder, Evelyn Lauder.

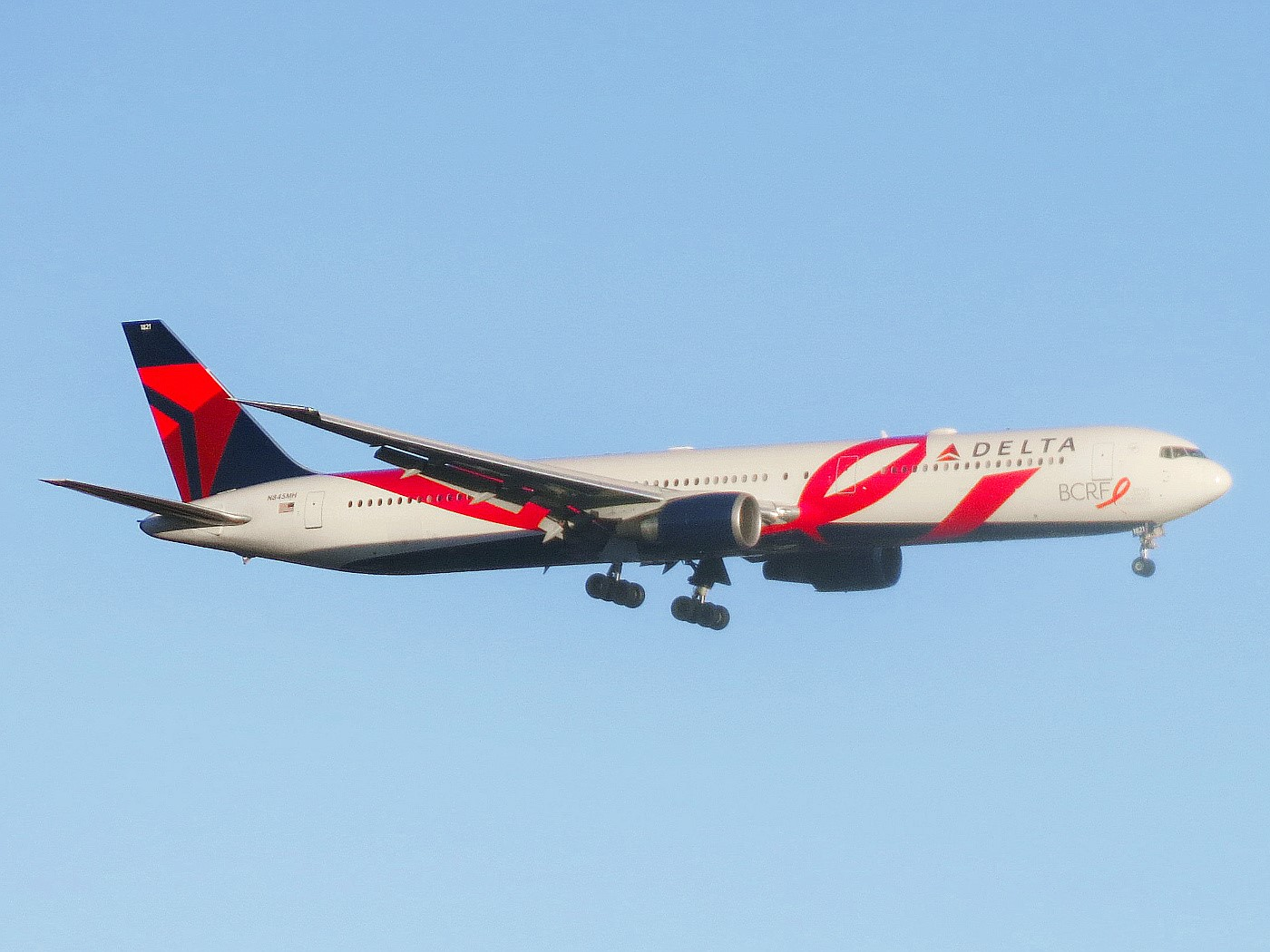
Delta ship#1821's livery was revised again in September 2015, retaining the BCRF theme. The pink ribbon is now painted on the fuselage with BCRF subtitles on an otherwise standard livery. This picture is a few weeks after the repaint.

In 2014, the BCRF claimed to direct more than 91 cents of every dollar raised to breast cancer research and breast cancer awareness programs. The organization has been recognized by several charity watchdog organizations, including Candid, Charity Navigator, and CharityWatch. CharityWatch rated BCRF with an A grade in their November 2021 report.
