= Larchmont, New York =

Village in Mamaroneck, New York, US

- Village
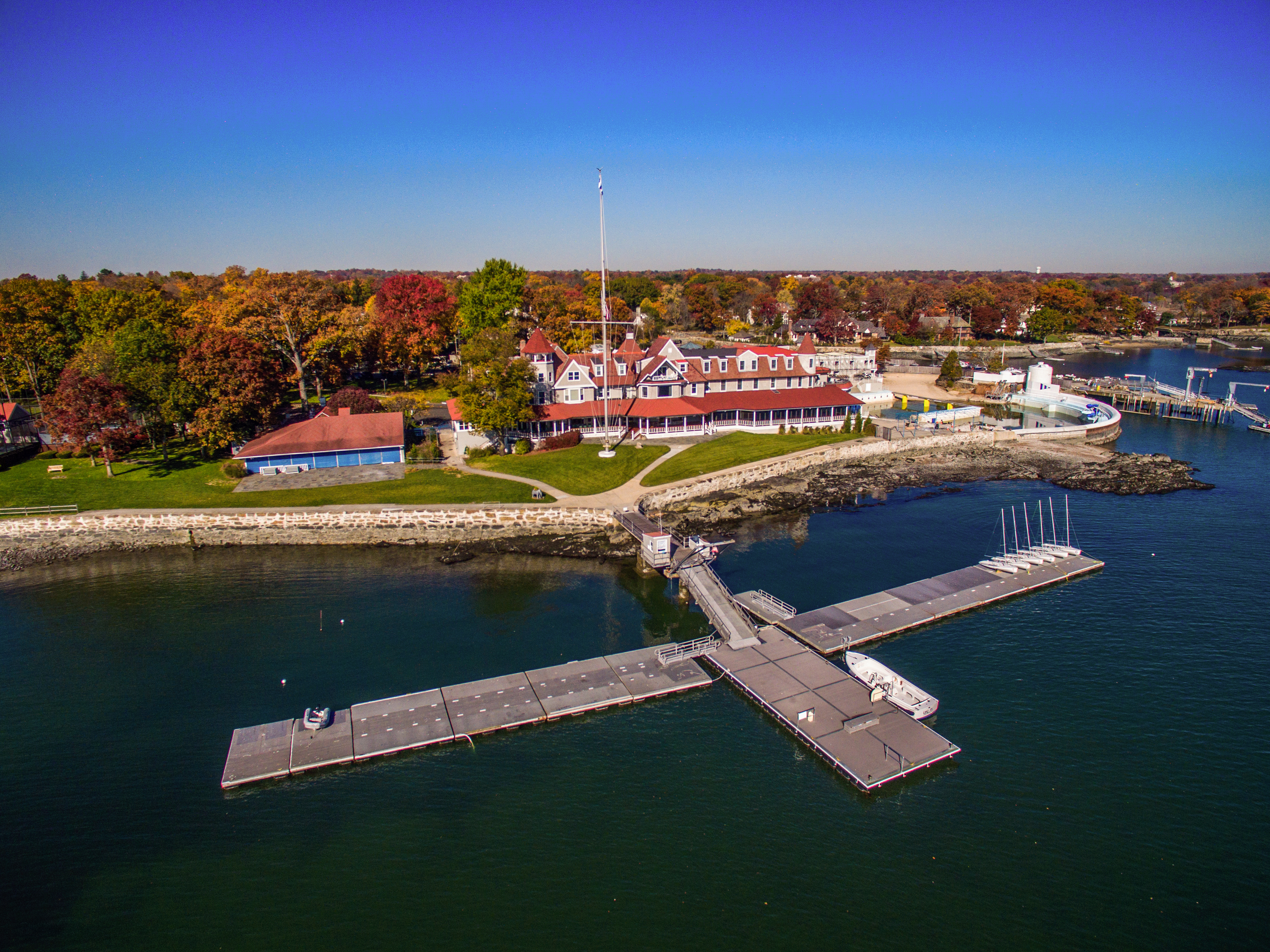
- Larchmont Yacht Club

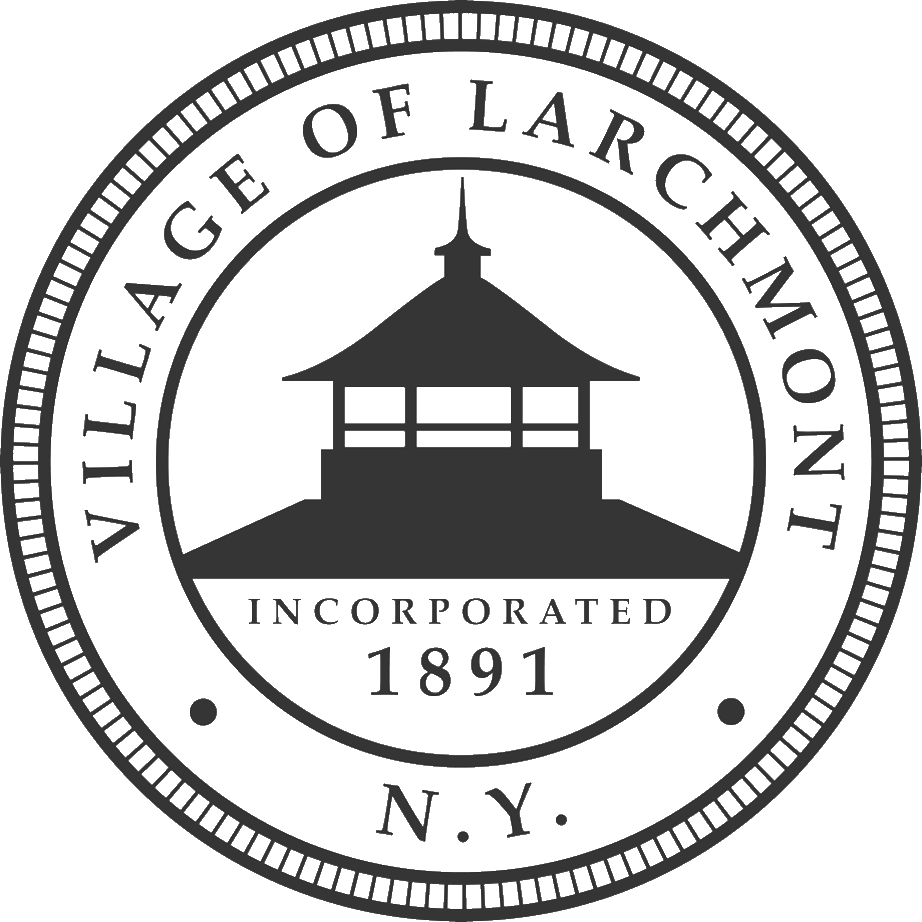
- Flag Seal

- Location of Larchmont, New York
- Coordinates: 40°55′34″N 73°45′11″W
- Country: United States
- State: New York
- County: Westchester
- Town: Mamaroneck

Government
  - Mayor: Brigid Brennan
  - Village Administrator: Aylone Katzin

Area
  - Total: 1.10 sq mi (2.84 km^{2})
  - Land: 1.10 sq mi (2.84 km^{2})
  - Water: 0.0039 sq mi (0.01 km^{2})
- Elevation: 52 ft (16 m)

Population (2026)
  - Total: 6,761
  - Density: 13,950/sq mi (5,388/km^{2})
- Time zone: UTC−5 (Eastern (EST))
  - Summer (DST): UTC−4 (EDT)
- ZIP Code: 10538
- Area code: 914
- FIPS code: 36-41333
- GNIS feature ID: 0977360
- Website: www.villageoflarchmont.org

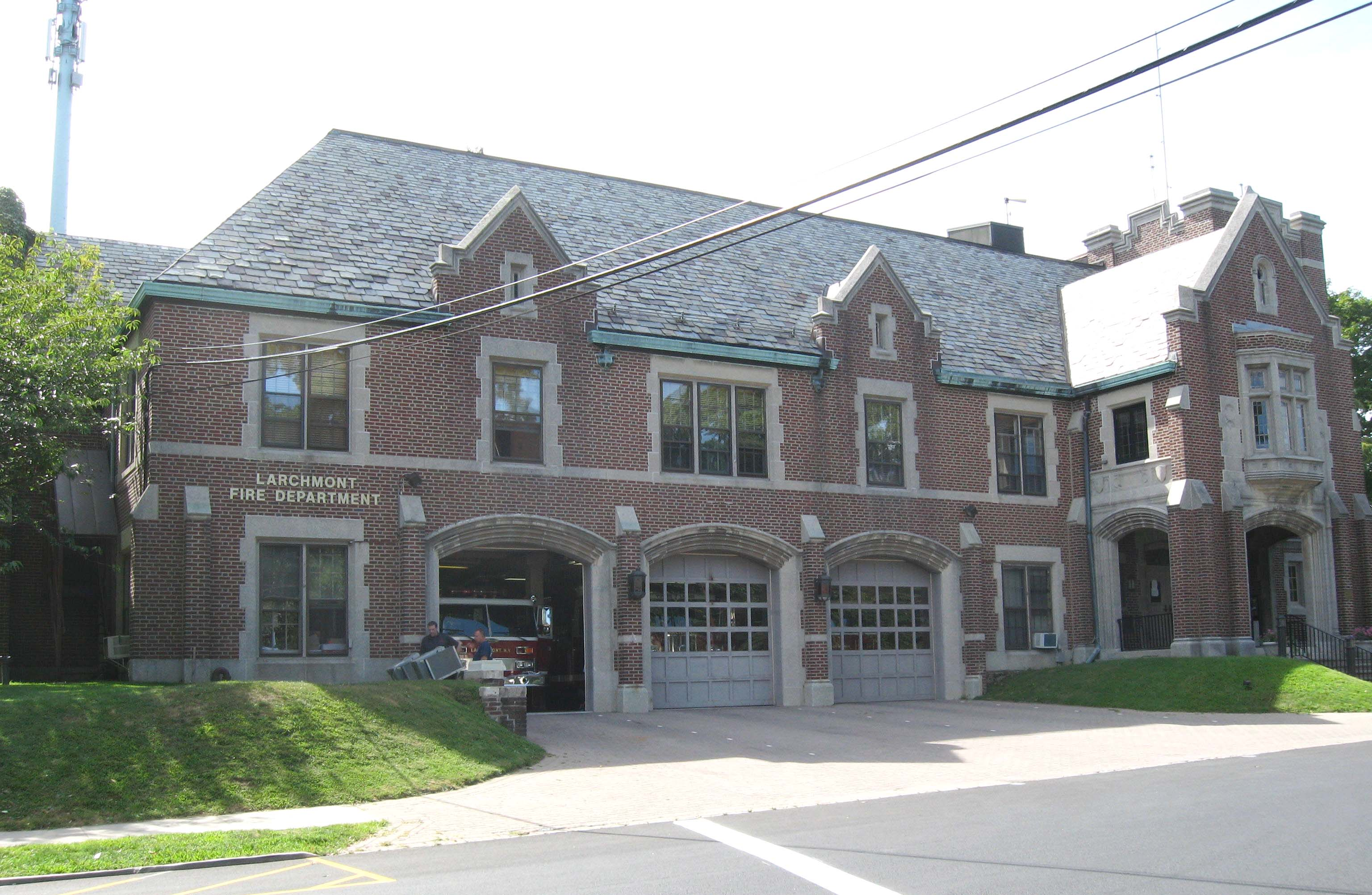
Village Hall and fire station

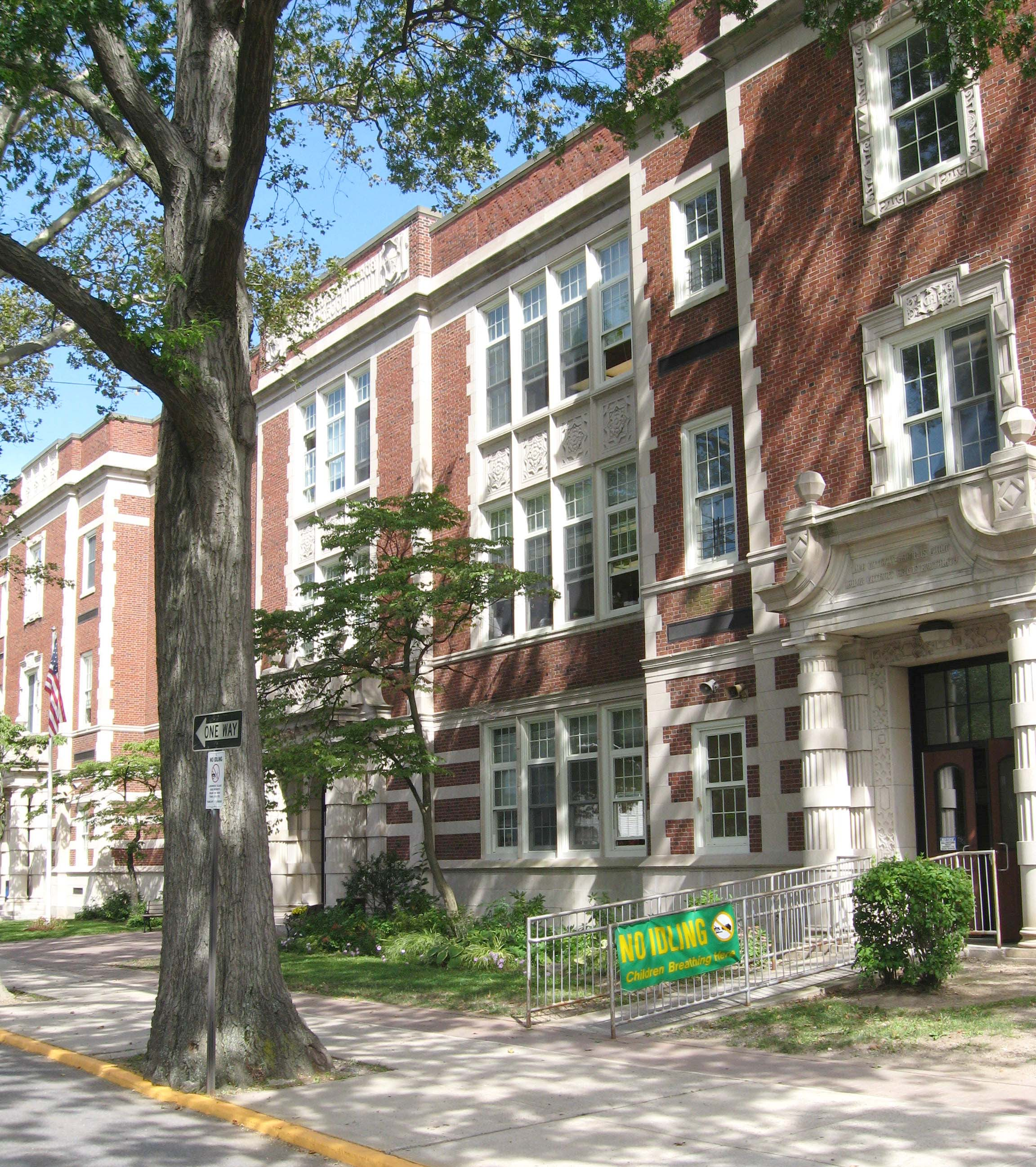
Chatsworth Avenue School

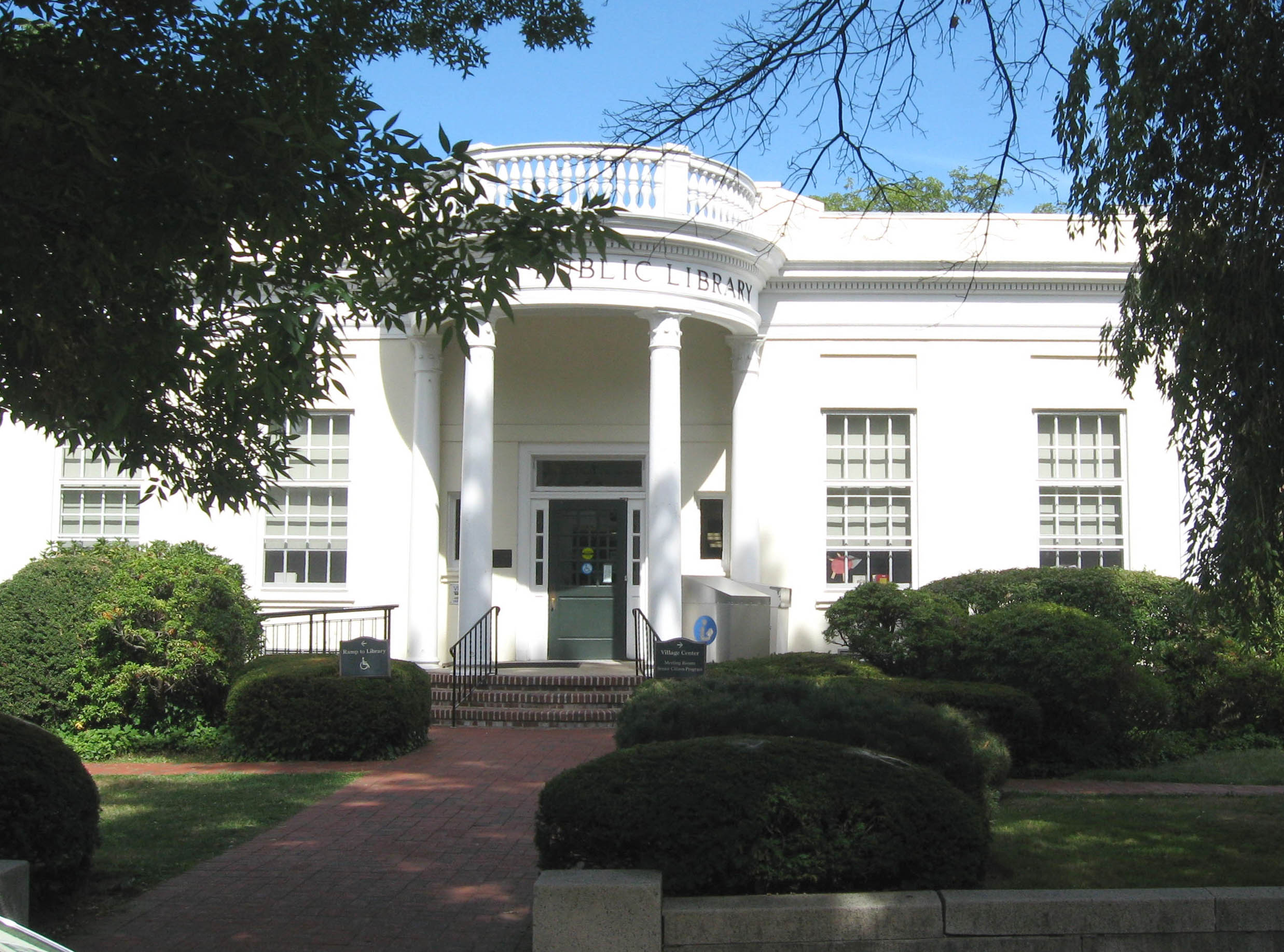
Larchmont Public Library

Larchmont (/lɑːrtʃmɒnt/) is an affluent village located in the Town of Mamaroneck in Westchester County, New York. Larchmont is a suburb of New York City and is located approximately 18 miles (29 km) northeast of Midtown Manhattan. As of the 2020 census, Larchmont had a population of 6,630. In February 2019, Bloomberg ranked Larchmont as the 15th wealthiest place in the United States and the third wealthiest in New York.

== History ==
=== Colonial period ===
Larchmont was originally inhabited by the Siwanoy (an Algonquian tribe), Larchmont was explored by the Dutch in 1614. In 1661, John Richbell, a merchant from Hampshire, England, traded a small amount of goods and trinkets with the Siwanoy in exchange for land that is now known as the Town of Mamaroneck. The purchase included three peninsulas of land that lay between the Mamaroneck River to the east and Pelham Manor to the west. The east neck is known as Orienta while the middle neck is what is now known as Larchmont Manor. The third neck was later sold and is now known as Davenport Neck in New Rochelle. The purchase was contested by Thomas Revell who, one month following Richbell's purchase, bought the land from the Siwanoy at a higher price. Richbell petitioned Governor Stuyvesant, Director General of the Colonies of the New Netherland, and Richbell was issued the land patent in 1662. In 1664 Great Britain took control of the colonies and Richbell received an English title for his lands in 1668 whereupon he began to encourage settlement. In 1675 Richbell leased his "Middle Neck" to his brother however when he died in 1684 none of his original property remained in his name. In 1700, Samuel Palmer, who had been elected the Town's first supervisor in 1697, obtained the original leases on the "Middle Neck", and in 1722 the Palmer family obtained full title to the land which included what is now the Incorporated Village of Larchmont.

Larchmont's oldest and most historic home, the "Manor House" on Elm Avenue, was built in 1797 by Peter Jay Munro. Munro was the nephew of John Jay, the first Chief Justice of the United States Supreme Court, and was later adopted by Jay. At the beginning of the 19th century, Munro was active in the abolitionist movement, helping to found the New York State Manumission Society, along with his uncle and Alexander Hamilton. In 1795 Munro had purchased much of the land owned by Samuel Palmer and by 1828 he owned all of the "Middle Neck" south of the Post Road and much of the land north of the Post Road as well. Munro later became a lawyer with Aaron Burr's law firm and built a home in Larchmont Manor known as the Manor House. Munro's house faced towards the Boston Post Road (the back is now used as the front), which tended to generate a lot of dust in summer months. To combat this, his gardener imported a Scottish species of larch trees that were known to be fast growing. These were planted along the front of the property, eventually giving the village its name.

=== Summer resort ===
When Munro died in 1833, his son Henry inherited the property which he subsequently lost and then sold at auction in 1845 to Edward Knight Collins, owner of a steamship line. By the end of the Civil War in 1865, Collins had gone bankrupt and his estate was put up for auction and purchased by Thompson J.S. Flint. Flint divided the estate into building lots and called his development company the Larchmont Manor Company. Flint then converted the Munro Mansion into a luxurious inn for prospective buyers and reserved some waterfront land for use as a park for the future residents of the Manor. After 1872 the area became a popular summer resort for wealthy New Yorkers. The arrival of the New York & New Haven Railroad replaced the stagecoach and steamboat as the main mode of transportation to and from New York City, making it much easier to commute and thus, modernizing travel which ultimately helped develop much of Westchester from farmland into suburbs by the 1900s.

=== Establishment of village ===
The New York legislature created Mamaroneck as a town in 1788, which includes a part of the Village of Mamaroneck, The Village of Larchmont, and the unincorporated area in the Town of Mamaroneck. This three part division occurred in the 1890s to meet the growing demand for municipal services which the town could not provide. At the time, a town was defined as only being able to provide basic government functions leaving residents of Larchmont in need of adequate water supply, sewage disposal, garbage collection, and police and fire protection. In 1891 the residents of Larchmont Manor obtained a charter from the legislature in which they incorporated that section of Town into a village. In order to comply with a law requiring incorporated villages to have at least 300 inhabitants per square mile, the boundaries of the newly incorporated Larchmont village were expanded beyond the Manor's 288 acres (1.17 km^{2}) to include land to its north and south of the railroad, and east to Weaver Street.

After the advent of the automobile, Larchmont quickly transitioned from a resort community into one of the earliest suburbs in the United States, catering to wealthy individuals commuting to and from New York City for work on a daily basis. Many of the Victorian "cottages" and a grand hotels (such as the Bevan House and Manor Inn) remain to this day, though these have been converted to other uses such as private residences. The Larchmont Yacht Club hosts an annual Race Week competition (2007 marked the 110th running of this event). It is adjacent to Manor Park, which was designed by Jeremiah Towle, an early summer resident of Larchmont Manor and an engineer. The Larchmont Shore Club (near the Larchmont Yacht Club) hosts an annual Swim Across America challenge, across Long Island Sound.

Larchmont and neighboring Mamaroneck and New Rochelle are noted for their significant French American populace mostly due to the French-American School of New York.

Larchmont, Los Angeles is likely named after Larchmont.

== Geography ==
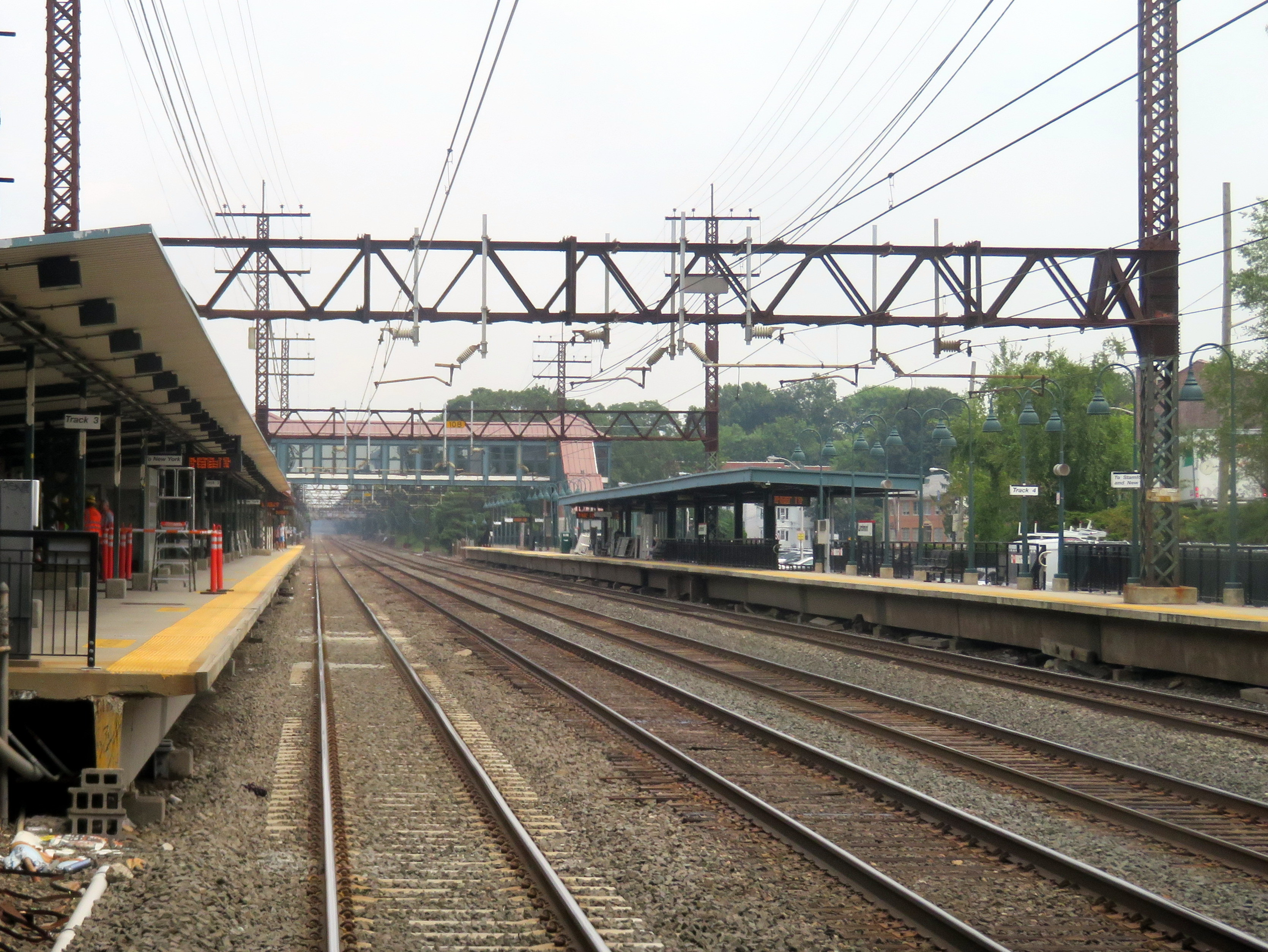
Larchmont station is a stop on Metro-North Railroad's New Haven Line

Larchmont is located at 40°55′34″N 73°45′11″W (40.926201, −73.753108), about 18 miles (29 km) from midtown Manhattan.

According to the United States Census Bureau, the village has a total area of 1.1 square miles (2.8 km^{2}), all of it land.

A source of confusion for non-locals is that a large portion of the area served by the Larchmont Post Office (zip code 10538) is actually not in the incorporated Village of Larchmont, but is part of the "unincorporated area" of the Town of Mamaroneck.

== Demographics ==
Historical population
Census	Pop.	Note	%±
1900	945		—
1910	1,958		107.2%
1920	2,468		26.0%
1930	5,282		114.0%
1940	5,970		13.0%
1950	6,330		6.0%
1960	6,789		7.3%
1970	7,203		6.1%
1980	6,308		−12.4%
1990	6,181		−2.0%
2000	6,485		4.9%
2010	5,864		−9.6%
2020	6,630		13.1%
U.S. Decennial Census

=== 2020 census ===
As of the 2020 census, Larchmont had a population of 6,630. The median age was 39.3 years. 30.5% of residents were under the age of 18 and 12.8% of residents were 65 years of age or older. For every 100 females there were 96.0 males, and for every 100 females age 18 and over there were 90.7 males age 18 and over.

100.0% of residents lived in urban areas, while 0.0% lived in rural areas.

There were 2,240 households in Larchmont, of which 46.2% had children under the age of 18 living in them. Of all households, 66.4% were married-couple households, 10.6% were households with a male householder and no spouse or partner present, and 19.5% were households with a female householder and no spouse or partner present. About 19.2% of all households were made up of individuals and 7.5% had someone living alone who was 65 years of age or older.

There were 2,332 housing units, of which 3.9% were vacant. The homeowner vacancy rate was 1.0% and the rental vacancy rate was 3.9%.

Racial composition as of the 2020 census
Race	Number	Percent
White	5,399	81.4%
Black or African American	153	2.3%
American Indian and Alaska Native	12	0.2%
Asian	262	4.0%
Native Hawaiian and Other Pacific Islander	0	0.0%
Some other race	201	3.0%
Two or more races	603	9.1%
Hispanic or Latino (of any race)	645	9.7%

=== 2000 census ===
As of the 2000 census, there were 6,485 people, 2,418 households, and 1,709 families residing in the village. The population density was 6,073.6 people per square mile (2,345.0 people/km^{2}). There were 2,470 housing units at an average density of 2,313.3 per square mile (893.2/km^{2}). The racial makeup of the village was 92% White, 2% African American, 0.09% Native American, 2.82% Asian, 0.08% Pacific Islander, 0.77% from other races, and 1.33% from two or more races. Hispanic or Latino of any race were 4.97% of the population.

There were 2,418 households, out of which 38.8% had children under the age of 18 living with them, 62.6% were married couples living together, 6.3% had a female householder with no husband present, and 29.3% were non-families. 25.8% of all households were made up of individuals, and 10.9% had someone living alone who was 65 years of age or older. The average household size was 2.66 and the average family size was 3.25.

In the village, the population was spread out, with 29.3% under the age of 18, 3.9% from 18 to 24, 30.1% from 25 to 44, 23.7% from 45 to 64, and 12.9% who were 65 years of age or older. The median age was 38 years. For every 100 females, there were 90.7 males. For every 100 females age 18 and over, there were 85.5 males.

=== Income and poverty ===
According to a 2009 estimate, the median income for a household in the village was $165,375, and the median income for a family was $204,695. The per capita income for the village was $109,664. About 1.6% of families and 2.3% of the population were below the poverty line, including 1.5% of those under age 18 and 5.1% of those age 65 or over.

== Education ==
One of the six schools of the Mamaroneck Union Free School District is located in the Village of Larchmont: Chatsworth Avenue School, which was established in 1903. The only other elementary school in Larchmont is called Murray Avenue School, which was built in 1922. Other schools include the elementary and high school located in the Town of Mamaroneck: Central School (Larchmont, New York), Hommocks Middle School, and the Mamaroneck High School.

Additionally, Saints John and Paul School is a co-educational, Roman Catholic school for grades K–8 which opened its doors in 1952. It is the parish school of Saints John and Paul Church.

== Parks and recreation ==
- Flint Park – offers a variety of sports facilities, including tennis and paddle tennis, three baseball fields, soccer fields, basketball courts, a picnic area, and a playground.
- Hommocks Park – features a pool, soccer field, baseball fields, and an ice rink where the New York Raptors play. They host an annual Thanksgiving tournament for some Special Hockey International teams. The Raptors are a special needs hockey team that formed in 1996. This is one of the home arenas the Raptors play at. They also play at Westchester Skating Academy. The rink is also home to the Mamaroneck High School hockey team and the Mamaroneck Tigers Youth Hockey Team. The rink is not only used for ice purposes, but other non ice purposes as well.
- Lorenzen Park – home to village Little League and Soccer League fields.
- Manor Park – situated along Long Island Sound, with walking paths and views of the water. The park is open to the public but is privately owned by the Larchmont Manor Park Society (which also maintains a beach within the park).
- Pine Brook Park – a play area for young children, along with a ballfield.
- Vanderburgh Park – also known as "Turtle Park", a play area for small children and toddlers.
- Willow/Woodbine Park – an opportunity for observing nature along the Premium River (includes basketball courts, soccer field, and a play area for both toddlers and young children).
- Memorial Park - the park includes four tennis courts, a tennis backboard, a large field, a picnic area, and a playground. It is situated in the town of Mamaroneck, directly opposite the Larchmont Village train station.

== Notable people ==
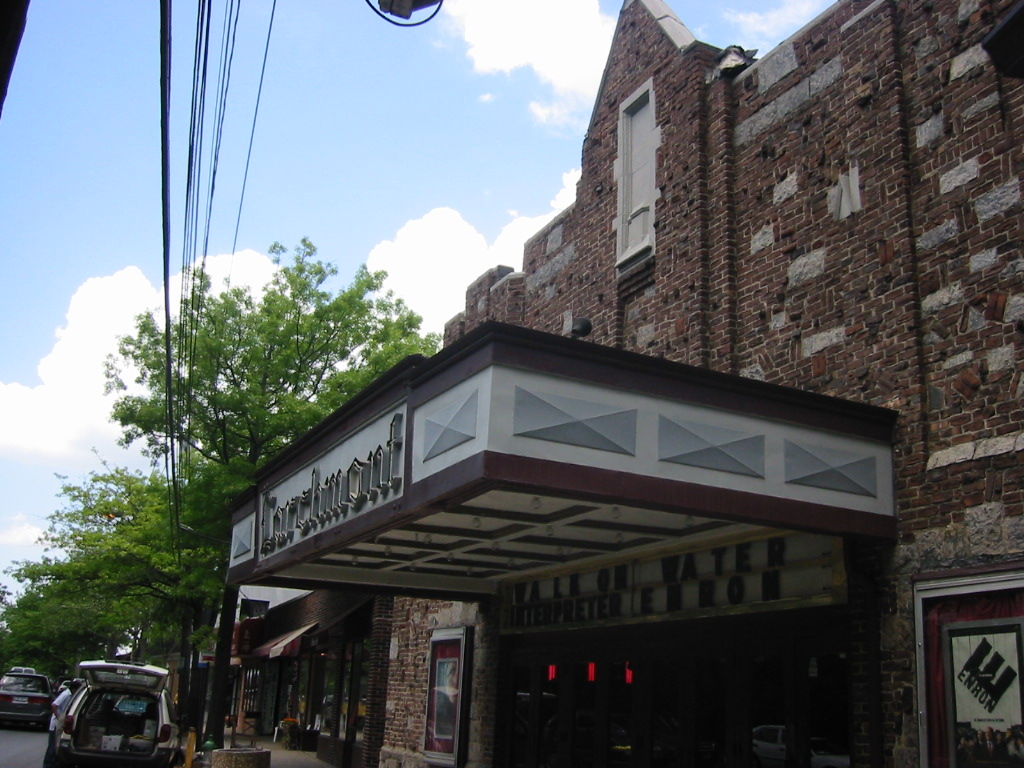
Larchmont movie playhouse

- Frederick Upham Adams, noted inventor and author
- Edward Albee, Pulitzer and Tony Award-winning playwright
- Edward Franklin Albee II, Vaudeville impresario
- Tommy Armour, golfer who won the U.S. Open, PGA Championship, and the British Open
- Michael "Flea" Balzary, "Flea" of the Red Hot Chili Peppers, bassist
- Maurice Barrymore, actor and patriarch of the Barrymore family
- Jason Bay, a Major League Baseball player, formerly a left fielder for the New York Mets
- Arnold Bernstein, German-American shipowner
- Elizabeth Berridge, film and theatre actress
- Mario Castelnuovo-Tedesco, Italian (Jewish) composer
- Young Yang Chung, world-renowned textile scholar and founder of the Chung Young Yang Embroidery Museum at Sookmyung Women's University
- Peter Coleman, World Class Sailor, Won the gold medal. Mallory Cup, in 1983 for North American Men's Sailing Championship, is named in the Inter-collegiate Sailing Association Hall of Fame.
- Aimee Crocker, Gilded-age era heiress, princess, Bohemian and mystic
- Agnes de Lima, journalist and writer on education
- Salvatore Di Vittorio, Italian composer and conductor
- Georgiana Drew, stage actress
- Douglas Fairbanks, actor, screenwriter, director, and producer noted for his swashbuckling roles in silent films
- Gerard Finneran, Wall Street investment banker arrested after 1995 air rage incident.
- Tom Frieden, former head of the Centers for Disease Control and Prevention
- Dan Futterman, actor and Oscar-nominated screenwriter, The Birdcage, Capote
- Michael Gargiulo, NBC New York Anchor
- Timothy Geithner, Former United States Secretary of the Treasury (2009–2013)
- D. W. Griffith, Academy Award–winning film director
- Adelaide Hall, Jazz singer and Broadway star; lived in Kilmer Road with her husband Bert Hicks between 1932 – 1936
- Erica Hill, journalist and broadcaster
- Homer Hoyt, land economist
- Michael Harrington, American socialist writer and theorist, author of The Other America
- Moss Hart, award-winning playwright
- Tor Hyams, Grammy nominated songwriter and producer.
- Gregg Jarrett, Fox News and Court TV Anchor
- C. Paul Jennewein, sculptor
- Lina Khan, former chair of the Federal Trade Commission
- Arshag Karagheusian, Armenian-American rug manufacturer and co-owner of A & M Karagheusian
- Jean Kerr, novelist and playwright
- Walter Kerr, writer and Pulitzer Prize-winning theater critic of The New York Times
- Marie Killilea, author best known for her books Karen and With Love From Karen
- Elizabeth Kolbert, journalist (The New Yorker) and author
- Ang Lee, Oscar-winning director
- Jasun Martz, award-winning musician who recorded with Michael Jackson, toured with Frank Zappa, and arranged the Starship #1 hit, "We Built This City".
- James McCaffrey, American actor best known for his voice role as the titular character in the Max Payne trilogy of video games.
- Phyllis McGinley, poet and author
- Gavin McInnes, co-founder of Vice, founder of the alt-right Proud Boys group, writer and political commentator
- Bennett Miller, American director
- George Mitchell, American actor of stage, film, and television, born in Larchmont in 1905.
- Nicholas Nassim Taleb, author of The Black Swan, Fooled by Randomness and other books
- Michael O'Keefe, actor (The Great Santini, Caddyshack, Roseanne)
- Chris Kerson, American film, television, and theater actor
- Rosselle Pekelis, Judge of the Washington Supreme Court and King County Superior Court
- Alfred E. Perlman, railroad executive, president of New York Central and Penn Central 1954–1970, lived in Larchmont during his tenure.
- Mary Pickford, Academy Award–winning actress and a co-founder of the film studio United Artists
- Martin Quigley, Jr., publisher, politician (Larchmont mayor), author, spy
- Joan Rivers, actress and comedian (may not have actually lived within the boundaries of Larchmont, but talked about the village in her early comedy routines)
- Amelia Rosselli, poet
- James Rubin, US Assistant Secretary of State for Public Affairs (1997–2000), was raised in Larchmont
- David O. Russell, award-winning movie director
- Doc Severinsen, pop and jazz trumpeter
- Lesley Jane Seymour, editor, entrepreneur
- Andrew Shapiro, composer
- Amy Siskind, political activist
- William Lee Stoddart, architect known mainly for hotels in the pre-World War II era
- Anna Tackmeyer, chef, cookery demonstrator
- Paul Terry, founder of Terrytoons
- Alton Tobey, artist
- George Vergara, Played with the Four Horsemen at the University of Notre Dame, Lineman on the Green Bay Packers, NCAA Referee, NFL Referee, Mayor of New Rochelle from 1955 to 1960
- Vincent Youmans, Broadway composer best known for composing "Tea for Two"
- Alexander von Zemlinsky, Austrian composer, conductor and brother-in-law of Arnold Schoenberg
- Anastasio Somoza Debayle, former President of Nicaragua, would stay at the family home of Stephen Colbert's mother in Larchmont during the holidays while attending boarding school.
- Lou Gehrig, the Yankee great known as "The Iron Horse," lived in an apartment at 21 North Chatsworth Avenue (The Stonecrest) in Larchmont (Town of Mamaroneck,) for some time.
