= St. Vito and Most Holy Trinity Parish (Mamaroneck, New York) =

Catholic parish in Mamaroneck, New York

Coordinates: 40°57′26.7″N 73°44′27.7″W

St. Vito and Most Holy Trinity Parish is a Latin rite Roman Catholic parish in the Archdiocese of New York, formed in August 2015 with the merger of the parish of St. Vito located on Underhill Avenue, with that of Most Holy Trinity parish on the Boston Post Road, both in Mamaroneck, New York. St. Vito's church is the parish church. "While the church of Most Holy Trinity remains open for public worship, Masses and other sacraments will not be celebrated on a regular basis at the church of Most Holy Trinity." Father Joseph Tierney is the current Administrator of Most Holy Trinity-Saint Vito Parish. The parish is served by the Knights of Columbus, Council 2247.

== See also ==
- St. Vito's Church (Mamaroneck, New York)
- Most Holy Trinity Church, Mamaroneck
