= Scarsdale, New York =

Coterminous town and village in New York, United States

- Town
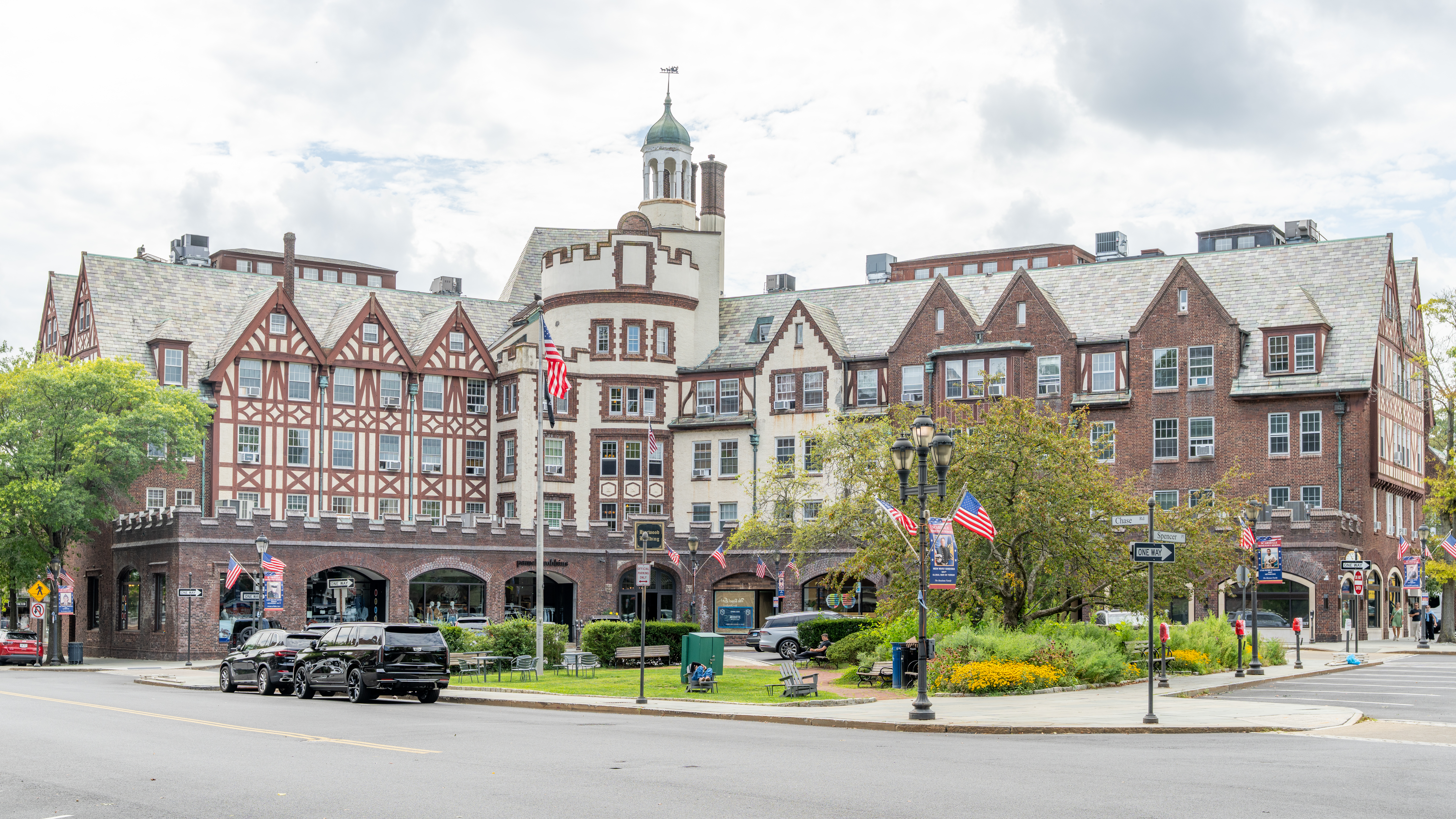
- Harwood Court

- Flag Seal Logo

- Location within Westchester County and the state of New York

- Location within the state of New York
- Coordinates: 40°59′32″N 73°47′13″W
- Country: United States
- State: New York
- County: Westchester
- Settled: March 21, 1701
- Incorporated (town): March 7, 1788
- Incorporated (village): May 24, 1915
- Named for: Sutton Scarsdale, Derbyshire, England

Government
  - Mayor: Justin K. Arest
  - Deputy Mayor: Dara B. Gruenberg
  - Village Manager: Alexandra Marshall

Area
  - Total: 6.68 sq mi (17.31 km^{2})
  - Land: 6.68 sq mi (17.29 km^{2})
  - Water: 0.0077 sq mi (0.02 km^{2})
- Elevation: 217 ft (66 m)

Population (2020)
  - Total: 18,253
  - Density: 2,734.5/sq mi (1,055.78/km^{2})
- Time zone: UTC−5 (Eastern (EST))
  - Summer (DST): UTC−4 (EDT)
- ZIP Code: 10583
- Area code: 914
- FIPS code: 36-65431
- GNIS feature: 0977410
- Website: scarsdale.gov

Scarsdale (/skɑːrzdeɪl/) is a coterminous town and village in Westchester County, New York, United States, 19 miles (31 km) north of New York City. It is on 6.683 square miles (17.31 km^{2}) and is located inland within the Bronx River Valley. Scarsdale includes 17 neighborhoods which are bundled into the geographic regions of Edgewood, Fox Meadow, Greenacres, Heathcote, and Quaker Ridge. It is served by the Scarsdale station of the Metro-North Railroad's Harlem Line. Scarsdale has six entries on the National Register of Historic Places.

In the precolonial era, the village's area was inhabited by a band of the Wappinger tribes of Native Americans. Caleb Heathcote purchased land from four Native American leaders near the end of the 17th century. The town was incorporated in 1788, yet in 1908 the town opted to use a village government following annexation threats from the neighboring city of White Plains. The population has increased from 281 people when established to 18,253 at the 2020 census.

The village is primarily residential. It has about 714.78 acres (289.26 ha) of recreational facilities and parks, all accessible to the public. The village has fifteen houses of worship, with three rectories. Scarsdale operates under a coterminous town-village structure with an elected Mayor and six Trustees, which appoints a professional Village Manager to oversee daily administrative operations. Its municipal departments include police, fire, recreation, and public works. In the New York State Legislature, Scarsdale is in the New York State Assembly's 88th district and the New York State Senate's 37th district. In Congress, the town/village is in New York's 16th congressional district.

== History ==
=== Toponymy ===
Scarsdale derives from "scars", the old Saxon word for rocky crags, and "dale", the common name for valley. The name originated from Heathcote's ancestral home in Derbyshire known as Sutton Scarsdale.

=== Before founding as Scarsdale ===
The region was once inhabited by several Native American tribes, the most prominent being the Wappinger people. Westchester Native Americans formed the Wappinger Confederacy as protection against the Iroquois people.

=== Colonial and Antebellum eras ===
Caleb Heathcote purchased land that would become Scarsdale from four Native American leaders named Patthunk, Beaupo, Kohawney, and Wapetuck at the end of the 17th century and had it elevated to a royal manor on March 21, 1701, after receiving a royal patent. The Manor of Scarsdale was one of the Six Manors of Westchester, and was substantially larger than Scarsdale is today. It extended over 6,000 acres and includes all of modern Scarsdale, Mamaroneck, Harrison, and parts of North Castle.

The first local census of 1712 counted twelve inhabitants, including seven African slaves. When Caleb died in 1721, his daughters inherited the property. The estate was broken up in 1774, and the town was officially founded on March 7, 1788.

The town saw fighting during the American Revolution when the Continental and British armies clashed briefly at what is now the junction of Garden Road and Mamaroneck Road, in what was called the Neutral Ground. The British commander, Sir William Howe, lodged at a farmhouse on Garden Road that remains standing.

According to first federal census in 1790, the town's population was 281. However, in the 1840 census, that number had declined to 255, due to a clerical error caused by the assistant marshal tasked with the census who did not understand Scarsdale's layout, resulting in him recording dozens of Scarsdale residents under the neighboring towns of Mamaroneck and White Plains. The true population climbed slowly from 317 in 1830 to 342 in 1850 — the vast majority farmers and farm workers.

=== Suburbanization ===
In 1877, Scarsdale became an express stop on the New York and Harlem Railroad, leading to an influx of commuters which jumpstarted the suburbanization process. Scarsdale remained mostly a farming village until after the Civil War, when The Arthur Suburban Home Company noticed the population spillover from the nearby metropolitan area, and wanted to convert Scarsdale from a rural town to a residential suburb. In 1891 it purchased a 150-acre (0.61 km^{2}) farm and converted it into a subdevelopment of one-family dwellings, which ended up starting a transformation of the community from rural to suburban. Following this, civil institutions soon appeared: the Heathcote Association in 1904, the Town Club in 1904, the Scarsdale Woman's Club in 1918, and the Scarsdale League of Women Voters in 1921. Schools started opening around this time as well, and the first store in Scarsdale opened on the corner of Popham Road and Garth Road in 1912. From 1910 to 1915, the population had rose from 1,300 to almost 3,000, and by 1930, that number approached 10,000.

In 1908, the neighboring city of White Plains began considering annexing parts of Scarsdale. This ultimately resulted in the people of Scarsdale protesting the idea due to the differences between the two settlements. Following this, the Scarsdale Town Club learned that municipalities had greater protection from annexation when incorporated as villages compared to town governments, leading Scarsdale to incorporate as a village on May 24, 1915.

=== 1945–present day ===
Cardiologist Herman Tarnower, who began practicing in this area before the Second World War, initiated the Scarsdale Medical Center postwar. He became famous for devising and popularising the fad Scarsdale diet named for the town in the 1970s.

Scarsdale became the subject of national controversy in the 1950s when a "Committee of Ten" led by Otto Dohrenwend alleged "Communist infiltration" in the public schools. A thorough investigation by the town rejected these claims. This same group, known as the Scarsdale Citizens Committee, sued to prevent a benefit for the Freedom Riders from taking place at the public high school in 1963 because some of the performers (Ossie Davis, Ruby Dee, Pete Seeger) were allegedly "communist sympathizers and subversives."

Another controversy enveloped the town in 1961, when the Scarsdale Golf Club, headed by Charles S. McCallister, refused to allow a young man who had converted from Judaism into the Episcopal Church, Michael Cunningham Hernstadt, to escort a young woman, Pamela Nottage, to her debut at the club. At the time, it was the club's policy to prohibit Jews from the premises. In response, the Rev. George French Kempsell of the Church of Saint James the Less announced that he would ban any supporters of the club's decision from receiving Holy Communion. The event marked a turning point toward the decline of anti-Semitism in the town. Beyond local social controversies, the town's relationship with religion also led to a landmark United States Supreme Court decision, Board of Trustees of Scarsdale v. McCreary (1985), which examined the right of local religious groups to place crèches on public property.

== Geography ==
According to the United States Census Bureau, Scarsdale covers a total area of 6.683 square miles (17.31 km^{2}), of which 6.675 square miles (17.29 km^{2}) is land and 0.008 square miles (0.021 km^{2}) is water. Scarsdale is around 19 miles (31 km) north of midtown Manhattan. It is part of Westchester County and so part of the New York metropolitan area and the New York–Jersey City–White Plains, NY–NJ Metropolitan Division. Scarsdale is on the Bronx, Sheldrake and Hutchinson rivers and part of the boundary between Scarsdale and White Plains is formed by the Mamaroneck River. Scarsdale Falls, an 18th century man-made mill dam waterfall is on the Bronx River. The village is a part of the Bronx and Hutchinson River Basin and the Lower Hudson River and Long Island Sound Drainage Basins. It is in telephone area code 914 and the postal ZIP code area 10583.

=== Neighborhoods ===
Scarsdale is divided into 17 neighborhoods, Arthur Manor, Berkeley-in-Scarsdale, Bramlee Heights, Colonial Acres, Drake Edgewood, East Heathcote, Fox Meadow, Greenacres, Heathcote, Murray Hill, Middle Heathcote, Old Scarsdale, Overhill, Quaker Ridge, Scarsdale Meadows, Secor Farms, Sherbrooke Park, and West Quaker Ridge, however these are often bundled into five geographic zones, which are Edgewood, Fox Meadow, Greenacres, Heathcote, and Quaker Ridge, corresponding to the subsequent elementary schools.

=== Climate ===
The town is in a humid continental climate zone (Köppen climate classification: Dfa), with cold, snowy winters and hot, humid summers and four distinct seasons. The United States Department of Agriculture places Scarsdale in plant hardiness zone 7a. Summer high temperatures average in the lower 80s Fahrenheit (upper 20s Celsius), with lows averaging in the lower 60s F (upper 10s C). Its highest recorded temperature was 102 °F (39 °C) in 1966, and its lowest was −14 °F (−26 °C) in 1979.

Climate data for Scarsdale, New York
Month	Jan	Feb	Mar	Apr	May	Jun	Jul	Aug	Sep	Oct	Nov	Dec	Year
Record high °F (°C)	73 (23)	75 (24)	86 (30)	96 (36)	97 (36)	99 (37)	104 (40)	102 (39)	101 (38)	89 (32)	82 (28)	77 (25)	104 (40)
Mean daily maximum °F (°C)	39.2 (4.0)	42.9 (6.1)	51.4 (10.8)	62.6 (17.0)	73.8 (23.2)	81.6 (27.6)	86.0 (30.0)	83.9 (28.8)	76.1 (24.5)	65.4 (18.6)	55.1 (12.8)	43.8 (6.6)	63.5 (17.5)
Mean daily minimum °F (°C)	20.1 (−6.6)	22.3 (−5.4)	29.1 (−1.6)	38.4 (3.6)	47.2 (8.4)	56.8 (13.8)	62.3 (16.8)	60.8 (16.0)	53.0 (11.7)	41.2 (5.1)	34.6 (1.4)	25.6 (−3.6)	41.0 (5.0)
Record low °F (°C)	−10 (−23)	−5 (−21)	2 (−17)	17 (−8)	29 (−2)	38 (3)	49 (9)	44 (7)	34 (1)	27 (−3)	12 (−11)	−4 (−20)	−10 (−23)
Average precipitation inches (mm)	3.56 (90)	2.84 (72)	4.07 (103)	4.16 (106)	4.33 (110)	3.44 (87)	4.20 (107)	3.93 (100)	4.37 (111)	3.67 (93)	4.09 (104)	3.80 (97)	46.46 (1,180)
Average snowfall inches (cm)	9.8 (25)	10.9 (28)	6.8 (17)	1.4 (3.6)	.2 (0.51)	0 (0)	0 (0)	0 (0)	0 (0)	.1 (0.25)	.8 (2.0)	8.6 (22)	38.6 (98)
Average rainy days (≥ 0.01 in)	8.5	8.1	9.3	9.8	10.9	9.3	9.0	8.7	7.6	6.7	9.2	9.4	113.4
Source 1: Weatherbase
Source 2: Homefacts (precipitation only) The Weather Channel (extremes)

== Demographics ==
Historical population
Census	Pop.	Note	%±
1920	3,506		—
1930	9,690		176.4%
1940	12,966		33.8%
1950	13,156		1.5%
1960	17,968		36.6%
1970	19,229		7.0%
1980	17,650		−8.2%
1990	16,987		−3.8%
2000	17,823		4.9%
2010	17,166		−3.7%
2020	18,253		6.3%
U.S. Decennial Census

=== 2020 census ===
As of the 2020 census, there were 18,253 people and 5,510 households living in Scarsdale, which had a population density of 2,734.5 inhabitants per square mile (1,055.8/km^{2}). There were 5,747 total housing units, of which 95.9% were occupied and 4.1% were vacant or for occasional use. The racial makeup of the village was 68.5% White, 21.0% Asian, 1.3% Black or African American, 0.1% Native American, and 0.0% Pacific Islander. Residents who identified as some other race were 1.4%, while those who identified as more than one race were 7.8% of the population. Hispanic or Latino residents of any race were 5.1% of the population.

Of the 5,510 households in the town, 81.2% were married couples living together and 1.1% were cohabiting but unmarried. Households with a male householder with no spouse or partner present were 5.7% of the total, while households with a female householder with no spouse or partner present were 11.9%. Out of all households, 53.0% had individuals under the age of 18 living with them and 30.7% had residents who were 65 years of age or older. There were 5,510 occupied housing units, of which 90.5% were owner-occupied and 9.5% were occupied by renters.

The median age in the town was 41.7 years old for both sexes, 41.4 years old for males, and 42.0 years old for females. Of the total population, 31.0% of residents were under the age of 18, and 14.7% were 65 years of age or older. The gender makeup of the town was 49.1% male and 50.9% female.

=== Racial and ethnic composition ===
Scarsdale village, New York – Racial and ethnic composition Note: the US Census treats Hispanic/Latino as an ethnic category. This table excludes Latinos from the racial categories and assigns them to a separate category. Hispanics/Latinos may be of any race.
Race / Ethnicity (NH = Non-Hispanic)	Pop 2000	Pop 2010	Pop 2020	% 2000	% 2010	% 2020
White alone (NH)	14,594	13,648	12,249	81.88%	79.51%	67.11%
Black or African American alone (NH)	263	242	220	1.48%	1.41%	1.21%
Native American or Alaska Native alone (NH)	2	5	7	0.01%	0.03%	0.04%
Asian alone (NH)	2,241	2,220	3,816	12.57%	12.93%	20.91%
Native Hawaiian or Pacific Islander alone (NH)	3	4	0	0.02%	0.02%	0.00%
Other race alone (NH)	35	79	127	0.20%	0.46%	0.70%
Mixed race or Multiracial (NH)	218	297	912	1.22%	1.73%	5.00%
Hispanic or Latino (any race)	467	671	922	2.62%	3.91%	5.05%
Total	17,823	17,166	18,253	100.00%	100.00%	100.00%

== Economy ==
Scarsdale, New York
Employment estimates by industry, 2024
Industry	Employment	Percentage
Management, business, and financial	3,261	40.80%
Education, legal, community service, arts, and media	1,780	22.27%
Healthcare practitioners and technical	853	10.67%
Computer, engineering, and science	760	9.51%
Sales and related	703	8.80%
Office and administrative support	207	2.59%
Personal care and service	233	2.92%
Healthcare support, protective service, food prep, & maintenance	88	1.10%
Natural resources, construction, and maintenance	76	0.95%
Production, transportation, and material moving	31	0.39%
Total	7,992	100%

As of 2024, Scarsdale has an estimated 8,365 residents in the civilian workforce, either employed or unemployed. The average one-way commute for Scarsdale workers is approximately 42.5 minutes; 24.2 percent of workers drove alone to their workplace, while 4.8 percent carpooled, 29.3 percent used public transit, and 36.4 percent worked from home. The largest industry of employment for Scarsdale workers is finance, insurance, real estate, rental, and leasing with approximately 28.9 percent, followed by educational services and health care (26.0%), professional, scientific, management, administrative, and waste management services (23.0%), and sales and office occupations (11.4%).

Scarsdale is one of two municipalities (Note: The other is the village of Rye Brook, New York.) in Westchester County with no land designated for manufacturing, warehousing, or industrial purposes. However, there are two business districts, with one of them being the Village center and the other being by Heathcote Five Corners.

== Arts and culture ==
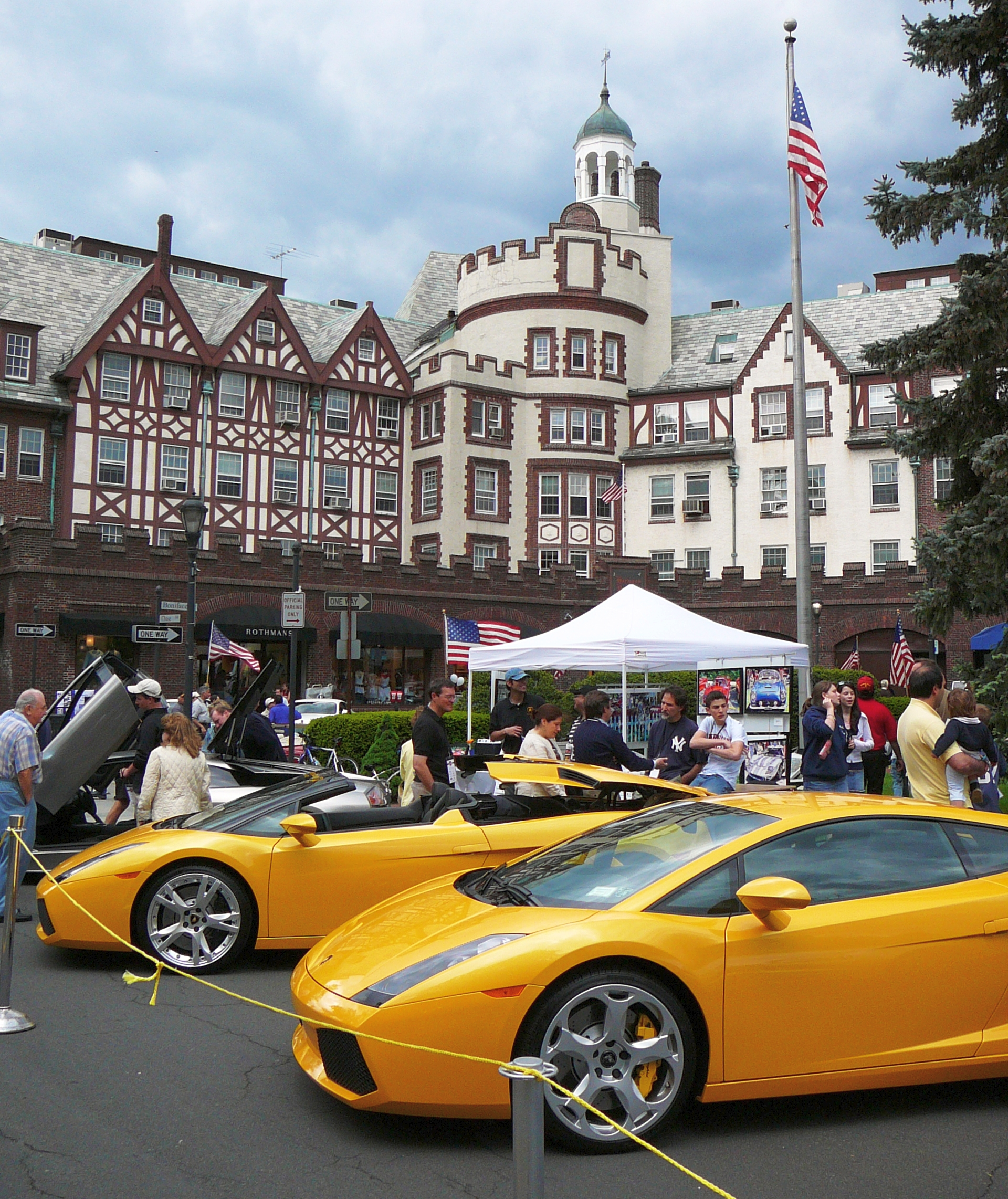
Concours d'Elegance car show

The Scarsdale Concours d'Elegance is an annual car show that has raised over $600,000 in funds for charities across Westchester County.

Scarsdale hosts the Southern Westchester Food and Wine Festival.

=== Historic sites ===
Sites listed on the National Register of Historic Places include:

- Caleb Hyatt House - Two wood-framed buildings from the mid-1700s.
- Quaker Ridge Golf Club - A private gold club founded in 1916; it has hosted PGA championships.
- Scarsdale station
- Scarsdale Woman's Club
- United States Post Office
- Wayside Cottage

=== Library ===
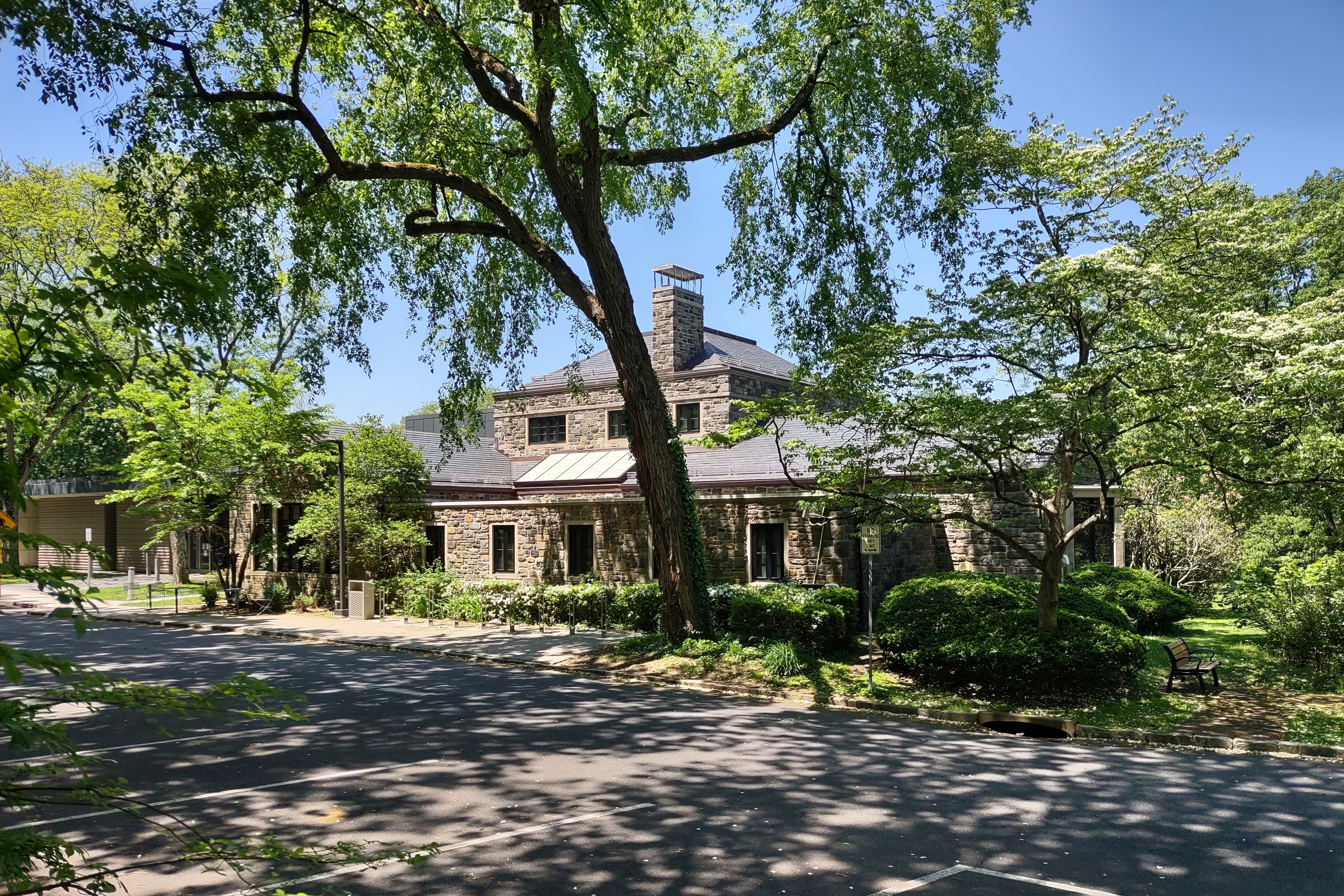
The Scarsdale Public Library in 2023

Scarsdale's public library was founded at Wayside Cottage in 1928. New York City publisher S. Spencer Scott raised $100,000 to erect a new library, which opened with 27,000 books in 1951. The $1,000,000 building was designed by Perkins&Will. The library is one of 38 public libraries in the Westchester Library System. The 25,000-square-foot (2,300 m^{2}) building houses a collection of over 147,000 books and audiovisual materials, and roughly 450,000 items are checked out of the library each year.

== Sports ==
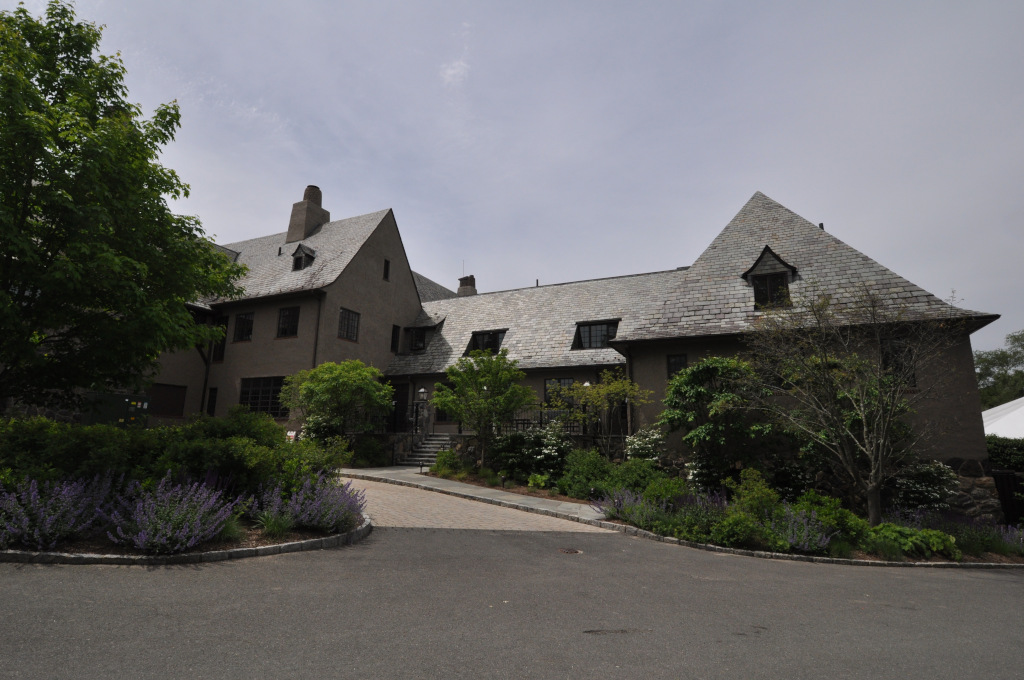
Scarsdale's Quaker Ridge Golf Club, a property also listed on the National Register of Historic Places.

The Scarsdale Town Pool was the swimming venue for the 2007 Empire State Games. Bicycle Sundays run along a 13-mile round-trip stretch of the Bronx River Parkway, which passes directly through Scarsdale.

Scarsdale Gun Club was founded in the late 19th century, and sport shooting is the oldest organized sport in Scarsdale. Scarsdale Golf Club was founded in 1898, when members of the Gun Club played golf in Yonkers. Private golf courses occupy approximately 6% of the village's land, or 254.93 acres (103.17 ha). There are tennis clubs in the village, and championship tournaments of the American Platform Tennis Association have been won by Scarsdale teams.

== Parks and recreation ==
Scarsdale has about 890.61 acres (400 ha) of recreational facilities and parks, with 635.3 acres (300 ha) of that total accessible to the public. There are 24 parks in Scarsdale including: (Note: In this context, parks are facilities which are not listed under the category "Village Facilities". The village lists the Pool Complex and its 4 pools as separate entities, however they are combined in this count.)

- The Weinberg Nature Center, built in 1958, a 7.7-acre (3.1 ha) facility featuring a nature trail, museum, and live animals.
- The 7.6-acre (3.1 ha) Scarsdale Pool Complex, opened in 1969, featuring four pools, a playground, basketball court, and sand volleyball court.
- Aspen Park, built in 1952, a 1.6 acres (0.6 ha) park including a playground and a small field.
- Boulder Brook Field, built in 1984, a 6.1-acre (2.5 ha) multi-use athletic field for sports such as lacrosse and soccer.
- Brite Avenue Park and Tennis Courts, built in 1952, spans 2.6 acres (1.1 ha) and includes tennis courts and a field.
- Chase Park, acquired between 1931 and 1960, spans 1.8 acres (0.73 ha) and features an open field, a park terrace, and picnic tables.

== Government ==
Scarsdale is a coterminous town and village under New York state law which utilizes a village government. The village government is led by a mayor and six trustees, all unpaid officials elected for two-year terms. The mayor of the village has been Justin K. Arest since being elected for a second term in 2025. A full-time, paid village manager who is appointed by the village's Board of Trustees, handles day-to-day community affairs; with the current Village Manager being Alexandra Marshall. Scarsdale's government operates from the village hall which houses the offices for the Village Manager, Clerk, Treasurer, and the Building and Planning Departments, and it also hosts regular meetings for the Board of Trustees, the Planning Board, the Zoning Board of Appeals, and the Board of Architectural Review.

Scarsdale selects its Board of Trustees using a non-partisan system that dates back to 1911 following a local controversy which involved a bipartisan system. Candidates for office are interviewed by a committee and then nominated for office. New York State law mandates that these nominees must be democratically elected; yet these nominated candidates are rarely contested in the general election.

In the Westchester County Board of Legislators, Scarsdale is represented by Democrat Jenn Puja in District 9. In the New York State Legislature, the village is represented by Democrat Amy Paulin for the New York State Assembly's 88th District. Democrat Shelley Mayer represents the village for the New York State Senate's 37th District. In Congress, the village is represented by Democrat George Latimer in the House of Representatives from New York's 16th Congressional District and Democrats Kirsten Gillibrand and Chuck Schumer in the Senate.

== Education ==
=== History ===
There is evidence of a schoolhouse existing in the late 18th century, as records show a town meeting was held there in 1783 or 1784. There were two school districts in Scarsdale up until 1965 when they were merged. Scarsdale District #1 included most of Scarsdale, while New Rochelle District #3 (eventually Scarsdale District #2) included Quaker Ridge and parts of New Rochelle and Mamaroneck. Records from District #1 have vanished, but there are hand written records from the 1870's and on. Until 1876, only one teacher was hired, which changed when the board of education believed that the single teacher needed help. As the population grew, so did the building, and by 1900 there were two full time teachers. New Rochelle District #3 dates back to 1815 when the Quakers built a schoolhouse, which was later transferred into the school district. It was replaced in 1863 by a schoolhouse built at Weaver Street and Quaker Ridge. The building was moved 30 years later when New Rochelle District #3 officially became Scarsdale District #2. Multiple private schools operated in Old Scarsdale, all of which closed down.

=== Primary and secondary schools ===
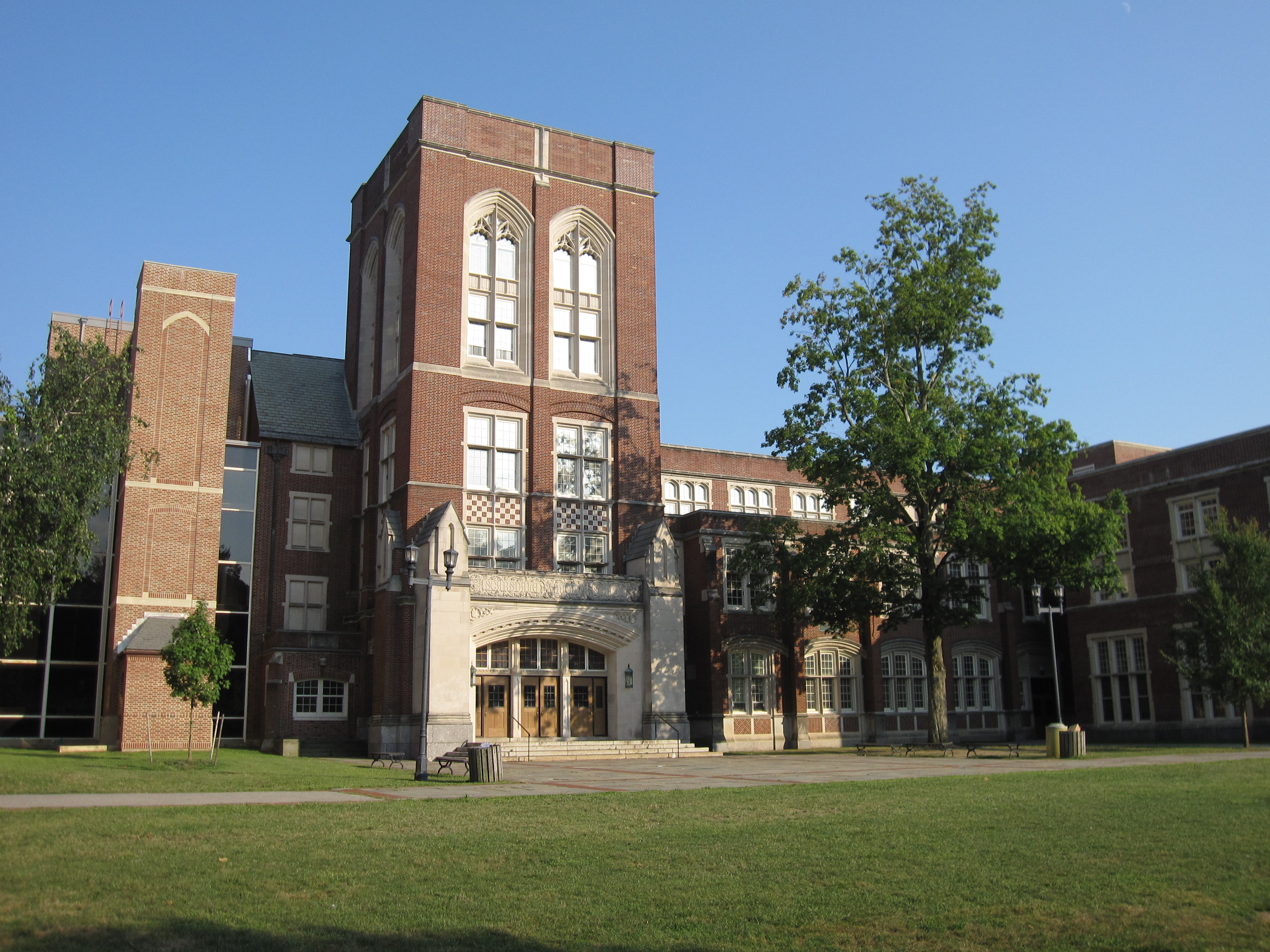
Scarsdale High School as seen from the front entrance.

Public education is administered by the Scarsdale Union Free School District, which covers the entirety of the village of Scarsdale, and some of Mamaroneck. It serves over 4,500 students each year. Elementary schools offer kindergarten to fifth grade, and are each named after their corresponding neighborhood: Schools include:

- Greenacres Elementary School
- Edgewood Elementary School
- Fox Meadow Elementary School
- Quaker Ridge Elementary School
- Heathcote Elementary School
- Scarsdale Middle School
- Scarsdale High School

Private parochial schools include the Roman Catholic Immaculate Heart of Mary, opened in 1928, St Pius X, opened in 1956, and Trinity Christian School, opened in 1955.

== Media ==
The Scarsdale Inquirer was a form weekly newspaper that reported on local issues, that began publishing in 1901. However, due to financial difficulties, the Inquirer released its last article on January 19, 2024. Scarsdale is served by three PEG (Public, Educational, Government) cable television stations: Scarsdale Public Television (SPTV) on channels 42 and 76, Scarsdale Government Television on channels 43 and 75, and Scarsdale Public Schools (SPS) TV on channels 27 and 77.

== Infrastructure ==
=== Transportation ===
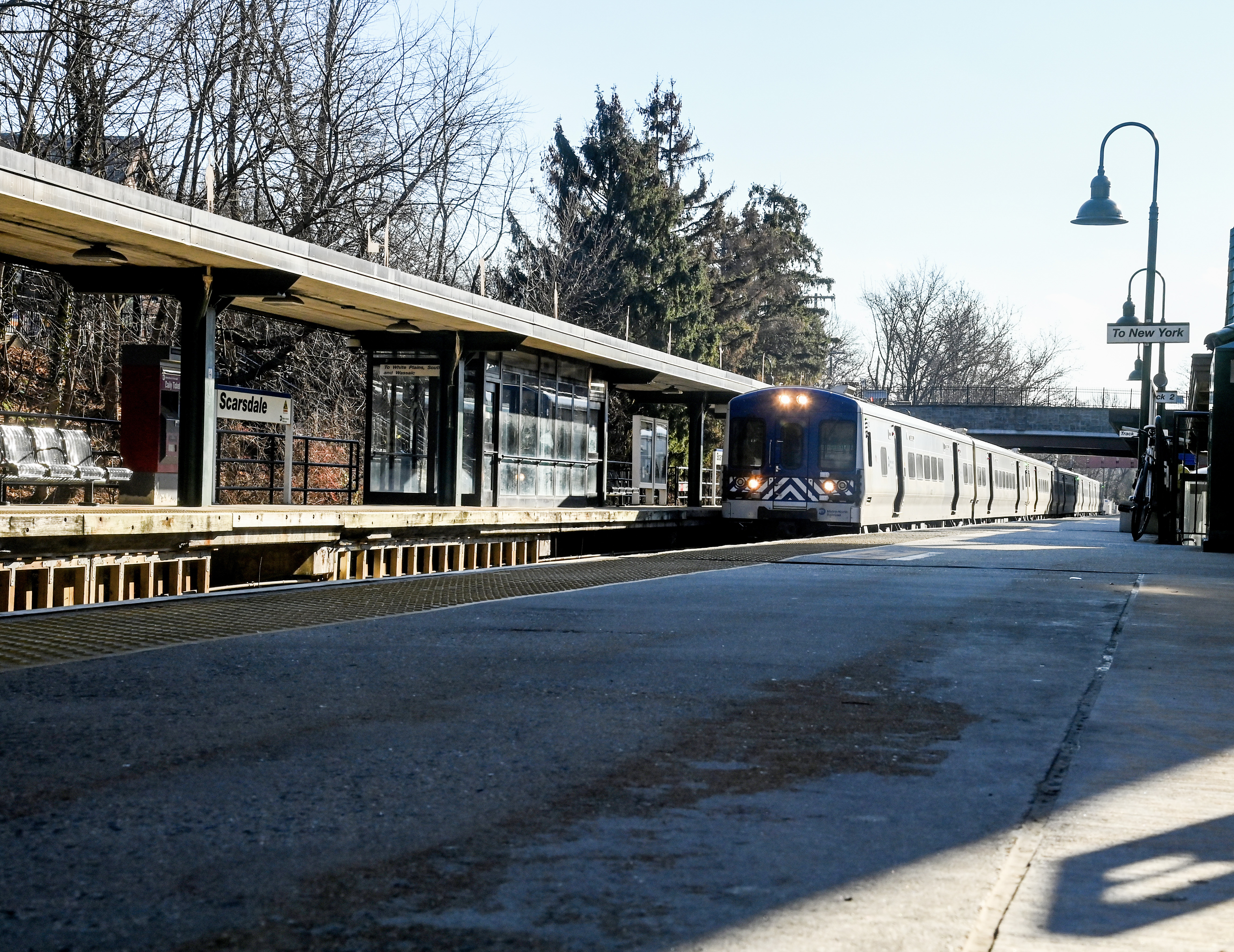
A train going through the Scarsdale station.

In 1846, the New York and Harlem Railroad (now the Metro-North Railroad's Harlem Line) connected Scarsdale to New York City, leading to an influx of commuters. It eventually became an express stop in 1877. The Scarsdale station is used by many commuters; as in 2019, 43% of workers took public transit to work while 41% drove alone, and in 2018 it was the seventh busiest Metro-North Station out of the 109 stations for inbound weekday boarding. Westchester County's Bee-Line Bus System provides service to Scarsdale.

For over 100 years, the Scarsdale Central Taxi served transportation needs of locals, typically by picking up or dropping off residents at the Scarsdale station, however recently the company has been losing business after COVID-19, partially due to competitors such as Uber and Lyft, along with the introduction of hybrid work, which resulted in many commuters not needing to travel to the station.

Limited-access highways in Scarsdale include the Bronx River Parkway and the Hutchinson River Parkway, with the Heathcote by-pass being a limited-access highway at a local scale. Major surface streets include Route 22 and Route 125.

=== Services ===
==== Fire department ====
The Fire Department was founded in 1893. Full-time fire and rescue protection is provided by both professional and volunteer firefighters of the Scarsdale Fire Department. There is one centralized fire department which operates out of 3 stations consisting of 46 career firefighters and roughly 50 volunteers. The police and fire department headquarters are located at Post and Fenimore Road respectively.

==== Police ====
The Scarsdale Police Department was founded in 1909. The department consists of 45 full-time police officers, nine civilian employees, and 14 school crossing guards. The department is divided into three sections: investigations, patrol, and support services. In June 2025, the Scarsdale Board of Trustees approved a $2.1 million contract with Flock Safety, which included license plate readers, live-view cameras, and drones.
