= Harbor Heights =

Coordinates: 40.96566°N 73.73619°W

- Residential section
- Location within New York
- Country: United States
- State: New York
- County: Westchester County
- Town: Mamaroneck
- Village: Mamaroneck

Harbor Heights is a residential section of the Village of Mamaroneck in Westchester County, New York. It is bordered by an arc of the Mamaroneck River on the north and east, by the Saxon Woods Park on the west and the New England Thruway on the south.

The United States Board on Geographic Names recognizes Harbor Heights as the official common name for the area, which it defines as a populated place existing within the incorporated Village of Mamaroneck.

== History ==
Originally known as the Knolls, Harbor Heights was first developed by Harry Rich Mooney in the 1920s. Mr. Mooney promoted the Knolls as a wholesome and convenient alternative to living in New York City and advertised the area in a nominal publication called Mooney's Megaphone in the New York Herald Tribune. Once Knollwood Avenue was established, other developers built homes east (across Mamaroneck Avenue) to the Mamaroneck River and the name Harbor Heights is inclusive of this area.

== Image gallery ==
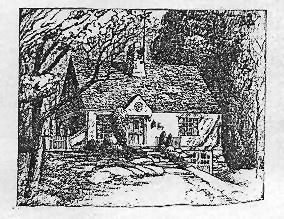
Dorsett Cottage Design

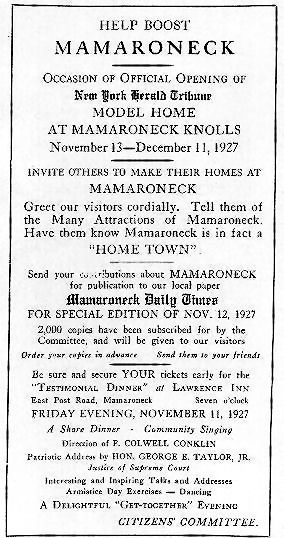
From the "Citizens Committee"

"Settling Down" from 'Mooney's Megaphone'
