= Wayside Cottage =

Historic house in New York, United States

- U.S. National Register of Historic Places
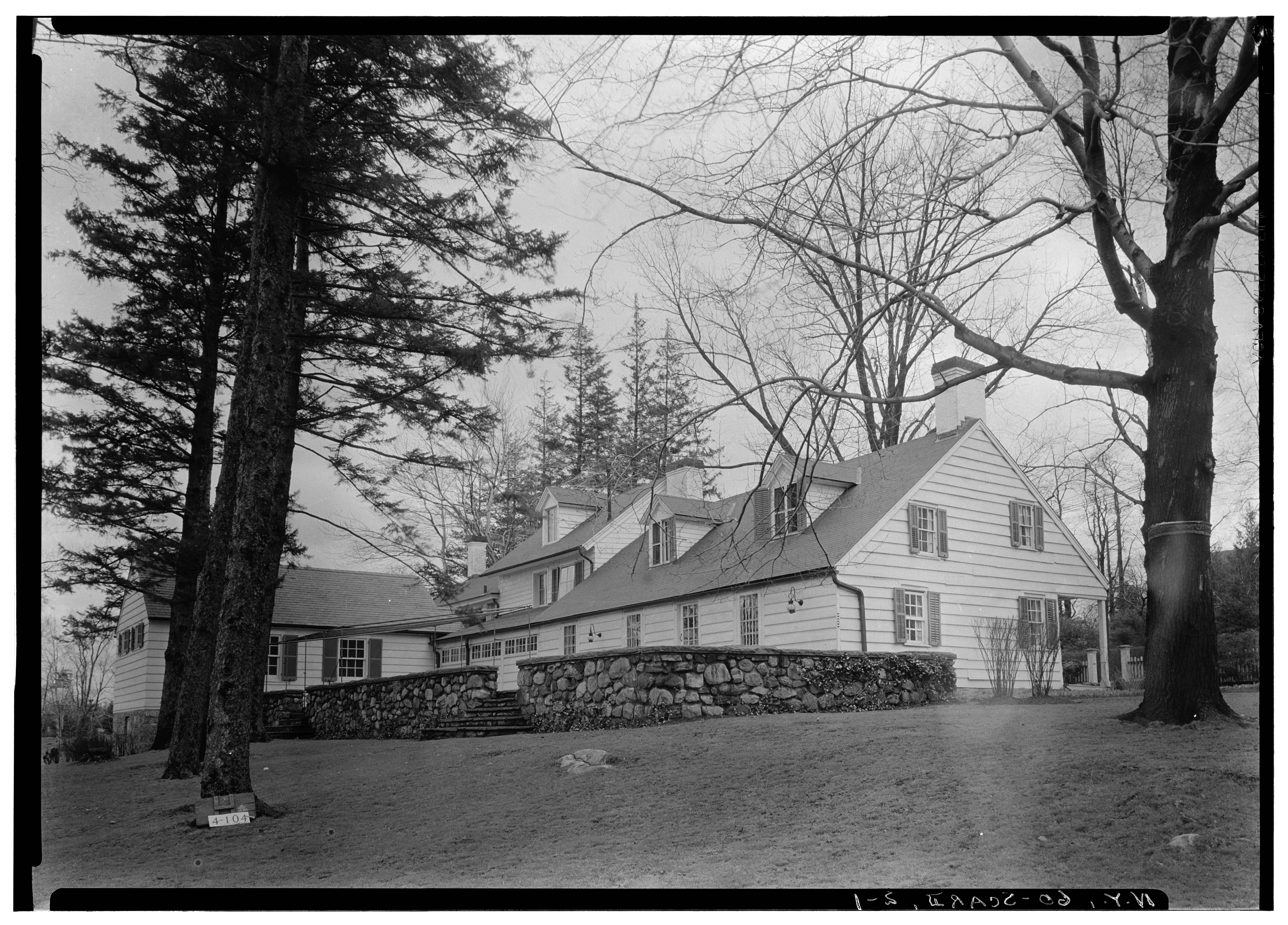
- HABS image of the cottage

- Location within New York Location within the United States
- Location: 1039 Post Rd., Scarsdale, New York
- Coordinates: 40°59′32″N 73°47′40″W
- Area: 0.7 acres (0.28 ha)
- Built: 1720
- NRHP reference No.: 81000418
- Added to NRHP: May 1, 1981

Wayside Cottage is a historic home located at Scarsdale, Westchester County, New York. The earliest part of the house was built about 1720 and is the four-bay-wide, two-bay-deep, 1 1/2-story south section. It sits on a fieldstone foundation and has a gable roof and verandah with Doric order piers. The center section of the house was built in 1828 and it is a 2 1/2-story, three-bay-wide structure with a gable roof and sheathed in clapboard. A third section is known as the "caretaker's quarters" and was built in the late 19th century. It is two stories high, three bays wide, and two bays deep. A wing was added to this section in 1928. The house underwent a major restoration in 1953–1954. Since 1919, it has been owned by the Junior League of Central Westchester. It was also where Scarsdale Public Library used to be.

The commemorative plaque reads: "For many years, before and after the Revolutionary War, a country tavern. During that long struggle for independence, a meeting place for Scarsdale Patriots and the scene of repeated attacks by British soldiers."

It was added to the National Register of Historic Places in 1981.

== See also ==
- National Register of Historic Places listings in southern Westchester County, New York
