= St. Thomas' Church (Mamaroneck, New York) =

Historic church in New York, United States

- St Thomas Episcopal Church
- U.S. Historic district – Contributing property
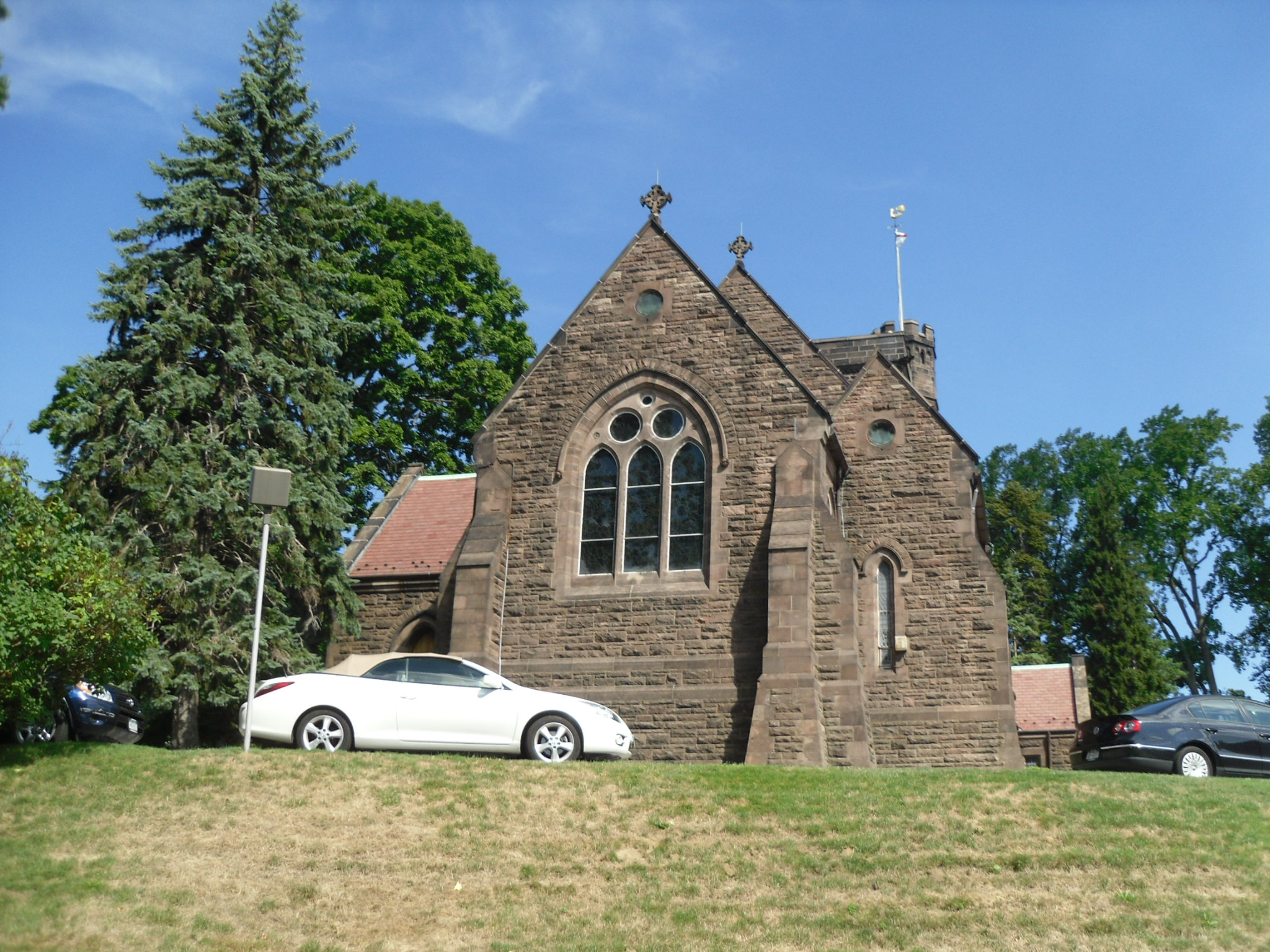
- St Thomas Episcopal Mamaroneck

- Location within New York Location within the United States
- Location: 168 West Boston Post Road (at the corner of Mt. Pleasant Ave.) Mamaroneck, westchester NY 10543
- Coordinates: 40°56′53″N 73°44′6″W
- Built: 1884
- Architect: Bassett, Jones
- Architectural style: Gothic Revival
- Part of: St. Thomas' Episcopal Church Complex (Mamaroneck, New York) (ID03000242)
- Added to NRHP: August 12, 2003

St Thomas Episcopal Church, at 168 Boston Post Road in Mamaroneck, New York, is a church in the Episcopal Diocese of New York. St. Thomas' Episcopal Church Complex was added to the National Register of Historic Places in 2003.
