= Most Holy Trinity Church, Mamaroneck =

American Roman Catholic church

Most Holy Trinity Church
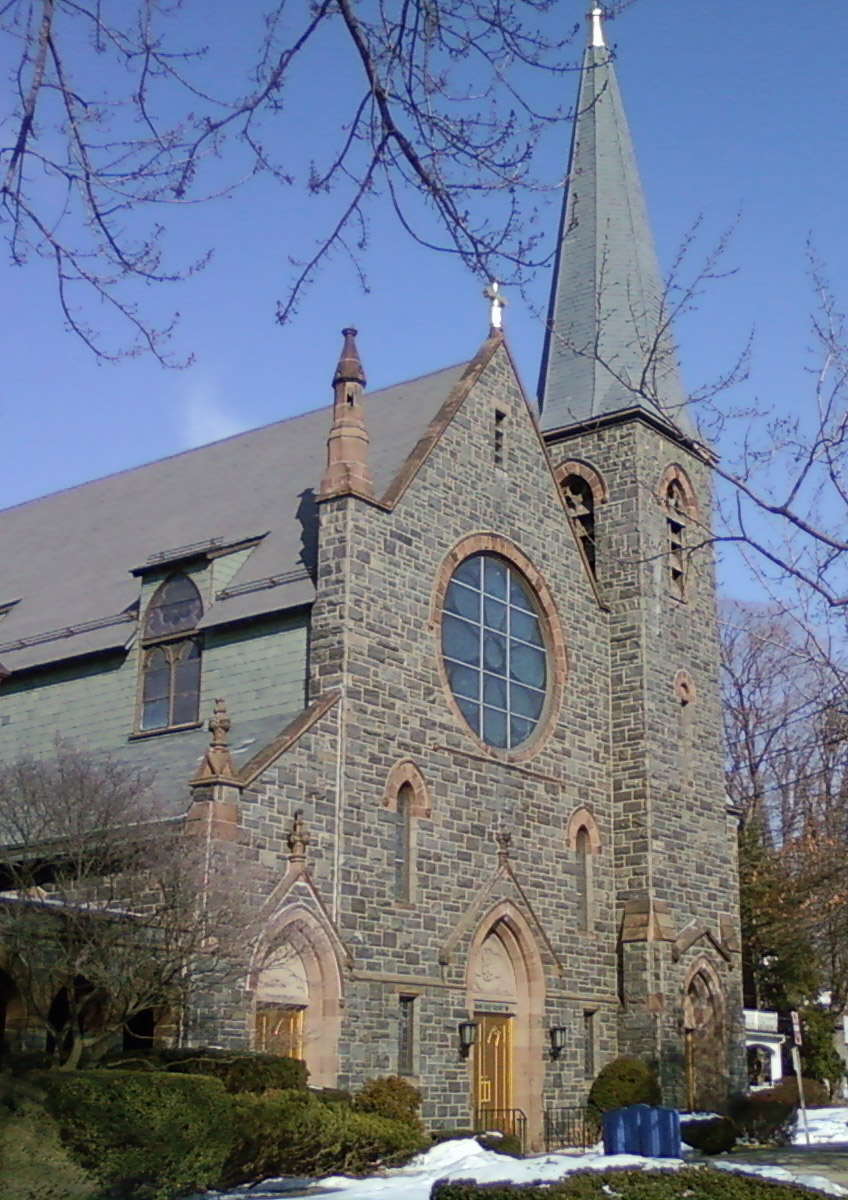
- Most Holy Trinity Church's front facade

- 40.9501456°N 73.7311748°W
- Location: 320 East Boston Post Road; Mamaroneck, New York
- Country: U.S.
- Denomination: Roman Catholic

History
- Founded: 1874 (152 years ago)
- Dedication: 1886 (140 years ago)

Architecture
- Functional status: Special-occasion use
- Style: Gothic Revival
- Completed: 1886 (140 years ago)

Administration
- Archdiocese: Archdiocese of New York
- Parish: Most Holy Trinity-Saint Vito

Clergy
- Archbishop: Ronald Hicks
- Pastor: Father Joseph Tierney

Most Holy Trinity Church, located on the Boston Post Road, is a historic Roman Catholic church in the Latin rite parish of Most Holy Trinity-Saint Vito in the Archdiocese of New York, in Mamaroneck, New York.

== Parish history ==
Most Holy Trinity Church began as St. Thomas Church, built in 1867. It was a mission of Blessed Sacrament Church in New Rochelle, New York. The mission became a parish in 1874, then the present church was built by 1885 and renamed Most Holy Trinity.

Most Holy Trinity was originally known as the church of St. Thomas when it stood at the corner of Spruce Street and Boston Post Road. The founder, Reverend Thomas McLaughlin, was a pastor in New Rochelle and visited the Mamaroneck area once a month by wagon to attend to any parochial details. During his tenure, twelve churches were built in the original territory of his jurisdiction and Mamaroneck was one of them.

It was an old tradition that father McLaughlin visited Mamaroneck once a month, saying mass in private homes and in the "Old Red House" which stood at the bank of the Mamaroneck River near Prospect Avenue, in the rear of the Hook and Ladder Company. During this time, baptisms, confirmations, first communion and marriages of the Mamaroneck Catholics took place in New Rochelle at a church called Saint Matthews, the first Catholic Church in New Rochelle. This church was later named Blessed Sacrament.

One of the parish's early pastors, Rev. Isidore Meister, was responsible for the construction of a new stone church building. Parishioners helped collect and save money and the project was completed in 1886. The new building was dedicated on Sunday, August 15, 1886, by Archbishop Corrigan. Since then, succeeding pastors worked to add on to the parish with a school, convent, rectory and gymnasium.

Most Holy Trinity Parish School (1st through 8th grades), current building erected in 1928, was run by the Sisters of Charity of New York. At its inception the sisters, living at Saint Vincent's Retreat Center (presently the hospital), traveled to and from by surrey driven by the church custodian, Patrick Murphy. They commuted for twenty-eight years until a convent was built on site in 1914. The Franciscan Sisters of Hastings also taught at the school. The school closed in 1987.

On November 2, 2014, the Archdiocese of New York announced as part of its "Making All Things New" round of church closures that Most Holy Trinity Parish would be merged with the Parish of Saint Vito also located in Mamaroneck. As of August 2015, the church became part of the newly formed parish of Most Holy Trinity-Saint Vito with no regularly scheduled masses occurring at Most Holy Trinity Church. The parish is served by the Knights of Columbus, Council 2247.

== Architecture and construction ==
N. J. O' Connor was the architect. Charles Worden of Rye with John Sheehan & Co., and P. Sheridan were the masons for the church. The stone used was Blue Byram stone and brown stone. The carpenters were George Burger and P. Sheridan.

=== Church art and stained glass windows ===
Most Holy Trinity Church is known for its stained glass windows. The windows depict the following:

Left side of the church (from front to rear): The Annunciation (Tabernacle area),

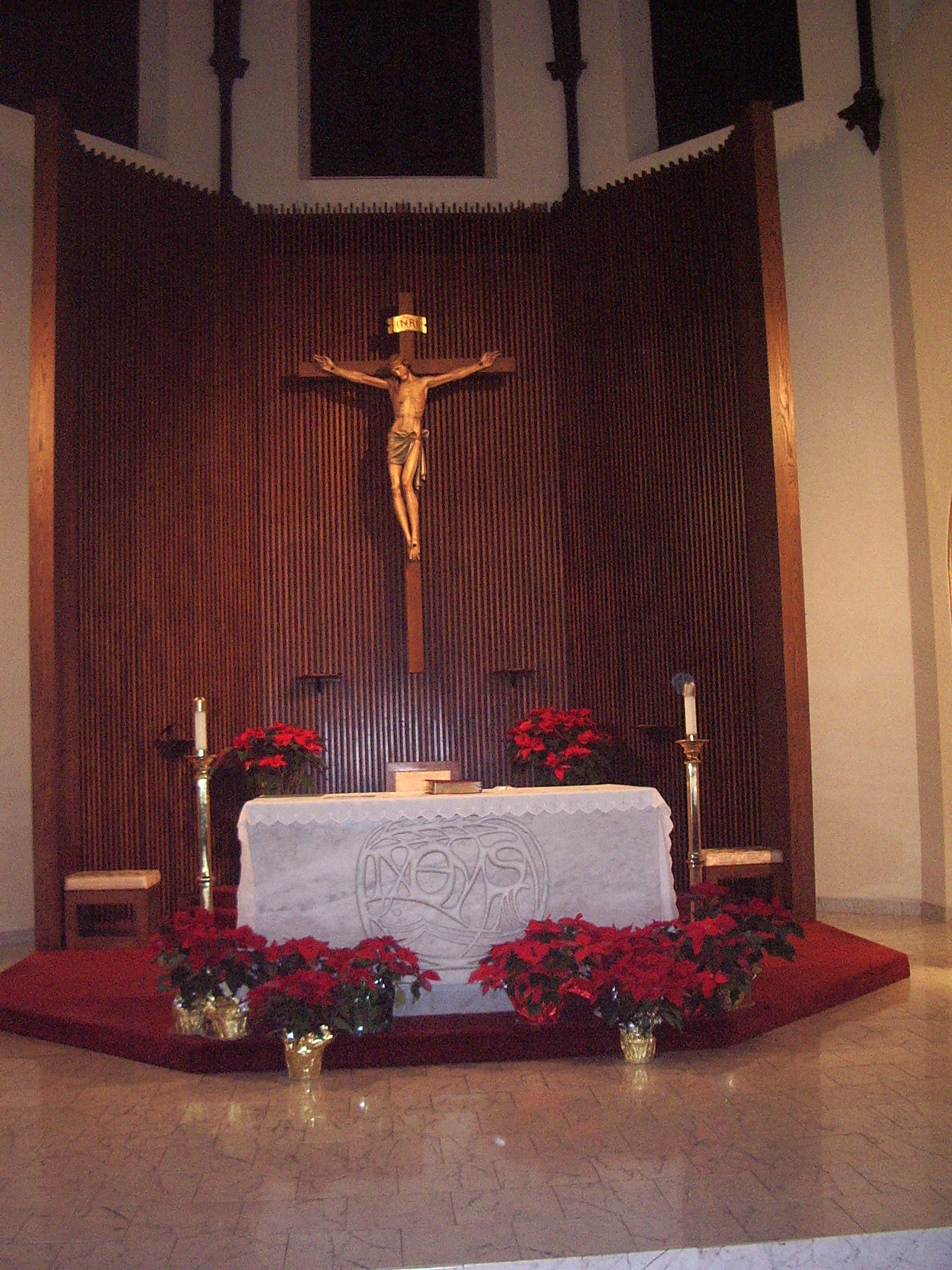
Holy Trinity Altar

Saint Stephen, Saint Elizabeth of Hungary, Saint Joseph with the child Jesus, Saint Ann with the child Mary, and Saint Isidore the Farmer.

Right side of the church (from front to rear): Saint Catherine of Alexandria (Baptismal area), Saint Bridget of Sweden, Saint Patrick, Saint Catherine of Alexandria, Saint Peter, Saint Gertrude the Great, and Saint Philip.

Above the altar (from left to right): Saint Athanasius, Saint Jerome, Saint Augustine, Saint Ambrose, The Holy Trinity (center), Saint Matthew, Saint John the Evangelist, Saint Isidore of Seville, and Saint Thomas Aquinas.

Roof Level (Left side, front to back): Handing of the keys to Saint Peter, the Sermon on the Mount, and Jesus healing the sick.

Roof Level (Right side, front to back): The Annunciation, The Nativity, and the finding of Jesus in the Temple

== Pastors ==
The first pastor of Holy Trinity was Father Christopher A. Farrell, 1874 to 1876, followed by Father Isidore Meister 1876 to 1913, Father Joseph P. Donahue, 1913 to 1924, who eventually became bishop and vicar general of the archdiocese.

Other former pastors include: Father Thomas P. Phelan, Father Francis J. Heaney, Father Thomas B. Kelly, 1942 to 1952, who had been the confessor of Rose Hawthorne, daughter of Nathaniel Hawthorne and the founder of the Servants of Relief for Incurable Cancer, Msgr. George C. Ehardt 1952 to 1969, Msgr. Thomas Darby, 1969 to 1976, and Msgr. John Mulroy, 1976 to 1989. Father Joseph F. Irwin was appointed to Mamaroneck in 1989. He was succeeded by Father Robert P. Henry in 2012 who served until the merger in 2015.

It was reported that Father Francis P. Duffy, served at Most Holy Trinity in the early part of the 20th century (Duffy was known as the chaplain of the Fighting 69th Regiment in World War I).

Father Joseph Tierney is the pastor of Most Holy Trinity-Saint Vito Parish.

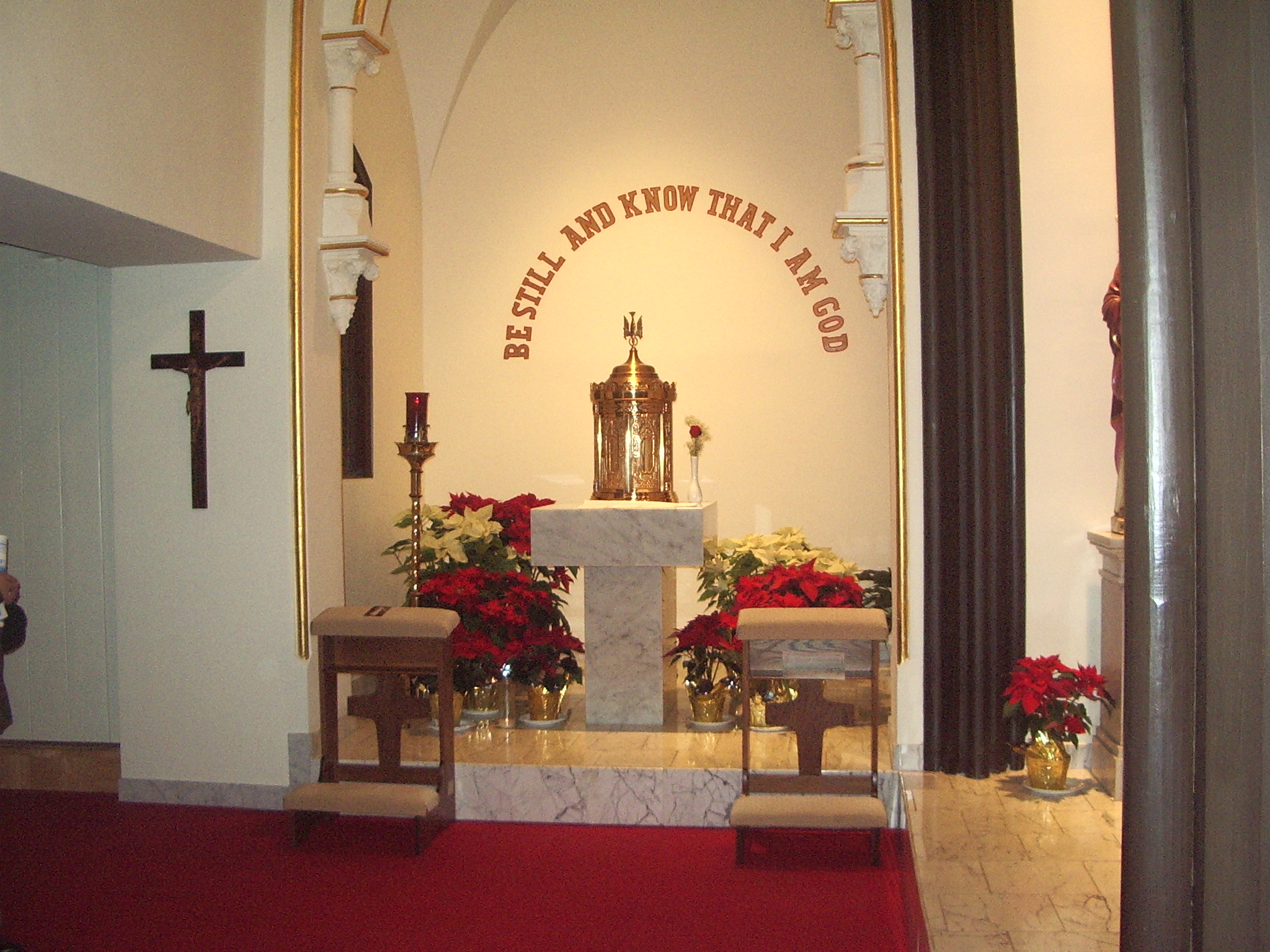
Holy Trinity Tabernacle
