= Mamaroneck station =

Metro-North Railroad station in New York

Mamaroneck
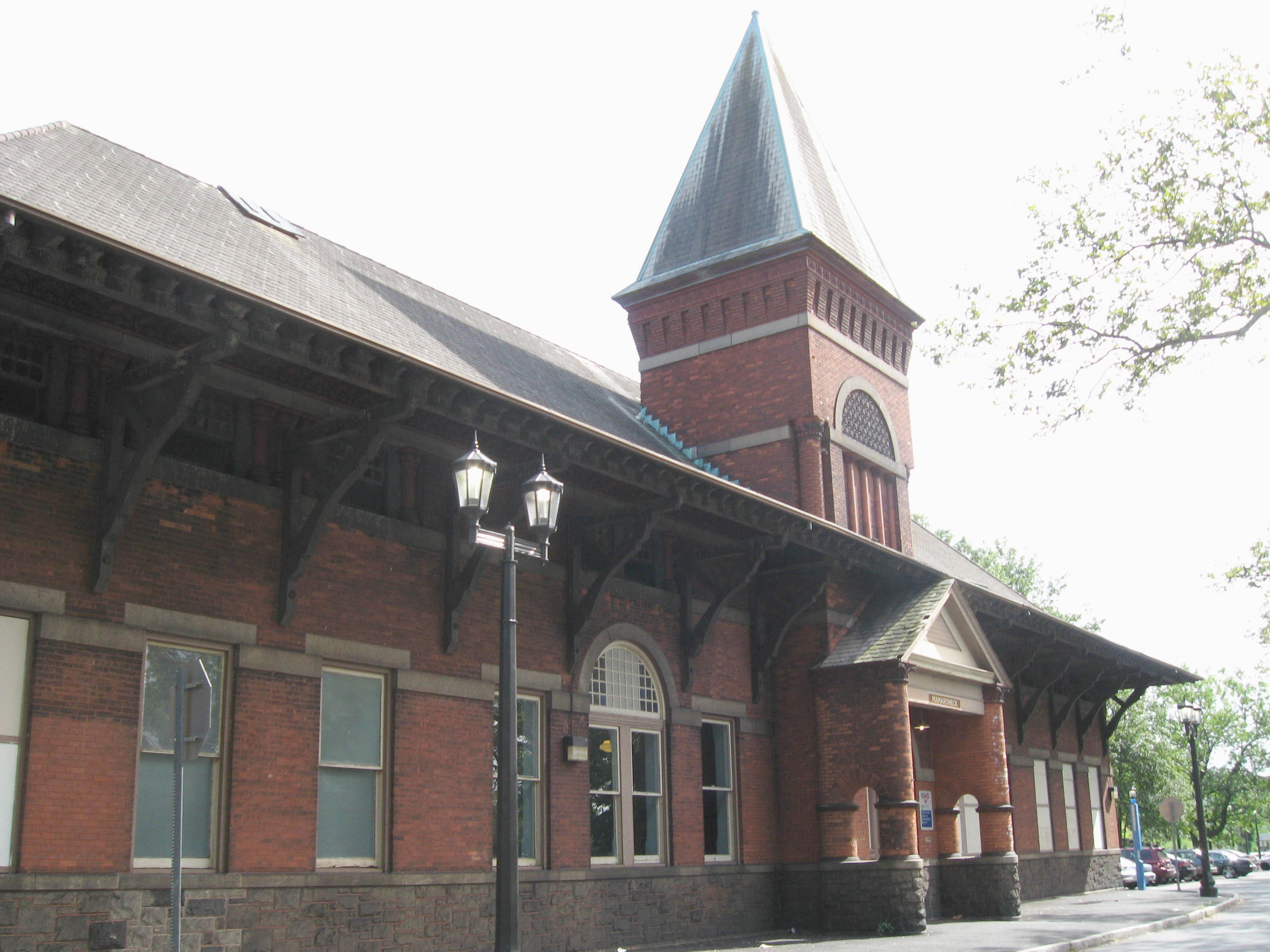
- Mamaroneck station in 2008

General information
- Location: 1 Station Plaza; Mamaroneck, New York
- Coordinates: 40.955109°N 73.736115°W
- Owner: Metropolitan Transportation Authority
- Line: MTA New Haven Line (Northeast Corridor)
- Platforms: 2 side platforms
- Tracks: 4
- Connections: Bee-Line Bus System: 60, 61

Construction
- Parking: 623 spaces

Other information
- Fare zone: 4

History
- Opened: January 1849
- Rebuilt: 1888

Passengers
- 2018: 3,006 daily boardings

Services
Preceding station	Metro-North Railroad	Following station
Larchmont toward Grand Central	New Haven Line	Harrison toward Stamford
Former services
Preceding station	New York, New Haven and Hartford Railroad	Following station
Larchmont Manor toward New York	Main Line	Harrison toward New Haven
Preceding station	New York, Westchester and Boston Railway	Following station
Larchmont Gardens toward Harlem River via Columbus Avenue	Port Chester Branch	West Street toward Port Chester
Location

Mamaroneck station is a commuter rail station on the Metro-North Railroad New Haven Line, located in Mamaroneck, New York.

== Station layout ==
The station has two side platforms, 10 cars long, which serve the outer tracks for the four-track Northeast Corridor. There are 623 parking spaces, including a combination of MNR and municipal operated metered and permit parking areas. Much of the parking capacity is not directly adjacent to the station. The station platforms are accessible to the disabled via ramps, but the station is not considered completely compliant with ADA requirements in that the route between platforms is difficult, and vehicular drop-off is suggested.

== History ==
The former Romanesque station building, near the north end of the inbound (to Grand Central Terminal) platform, was constructed in 1888, making it the second oldest surviving station building on the New Haven Line, according to a plaque inside the building. It was also a replacement for the original Mamaroneck New York and New Haven Railroad station built in 1848 across Mamaroneck Avenue on the corner of Mount Pleasant and Bishop Avenues. The original station at Mamaroneck burned in February 1889.

The station building was originally located at track level next to the New York, New Haven and Hartford Railroad (NH) platforms. The building was moved down an embankment to its present location in the 1920s to accommodate the construction of the New York, Westchester and Boston Railway (NYW&B) and separate tunnels connected the building to the respective railroad's platforms. A second NYW&B depot was also built in the Larchmont Gardens neighborhood to the northeast, which today is a Girl Scout building. Subsequent to the abandonment of the NYW&B in 1937, the area formerly occupied by the building and NYW&B platforms and tracks was converted to parking, and the building remained at the bottom of the embankment on Station Plaza, adjacent to Columbus Park. The tunnel to the NYW&B was sealed, and the exits to the former NYW&B platforms covered. The tunnel to the NH platforms remained open. Unlike many other stations on the line, the Mamaroneck station does not include a pedestrian overpass. The NYW&B tunnel became a wine cellar following the renovation of the station building, and its repurposing as a restaurant.

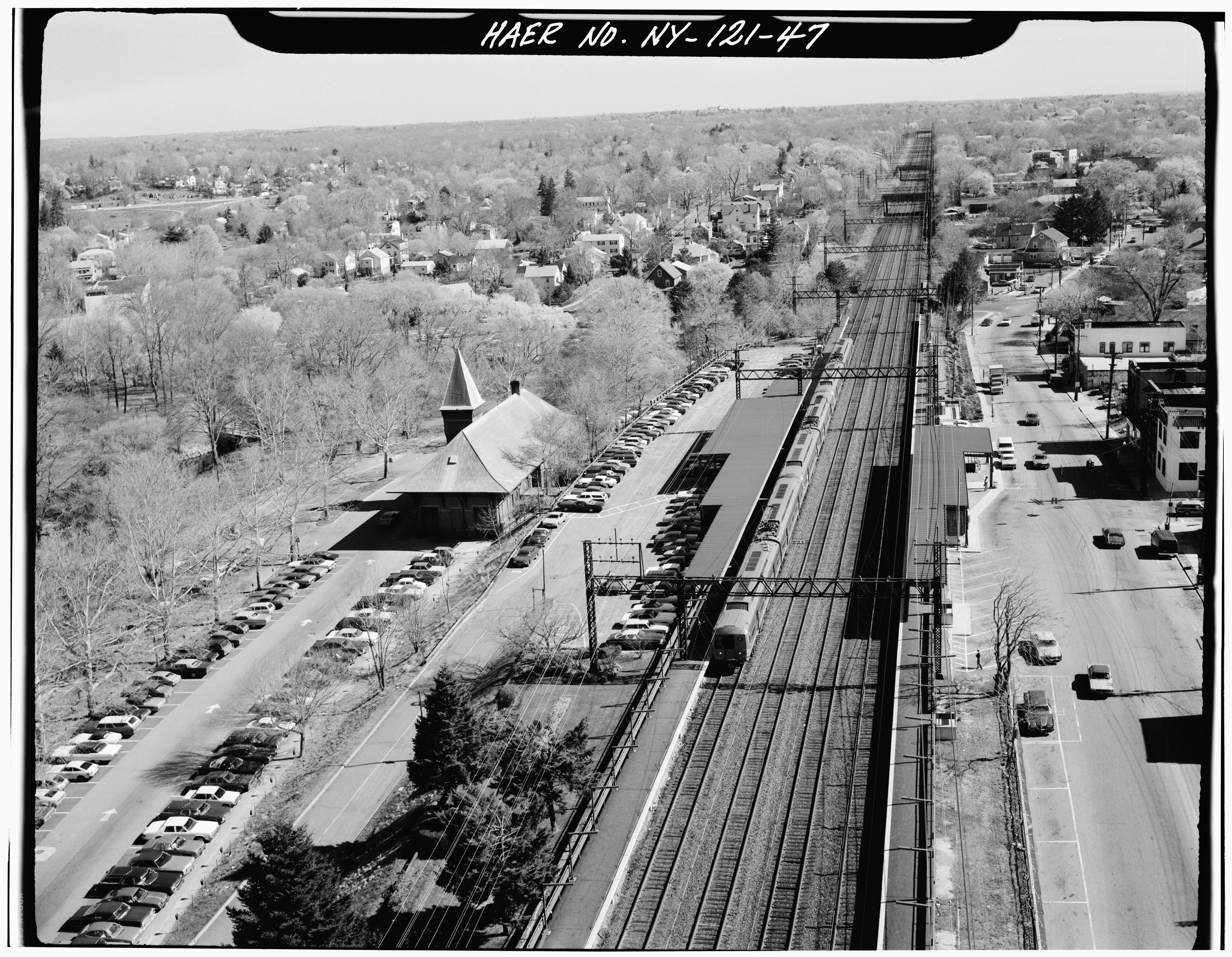
Aerial view of the station in 1979

As with all New Haven Line stations in Westchester County, the station became a Penn Central station upon acquisition by Penn Central in 1969. The station was updated in the early 1970s from low-level to high-level platforms. This was done to accommodate the arrival of new rail cars known then as Cosmopolitans, now more commonly known as M2s. The new cars did not include boarding steps, or traps, as their predecessor 4400 Pullman "Washboard" cars did, and could only board passengers at stations with high-level platforms. The update was done in two phases, with the eastern half of the station upgraded first; then the western half. This reconstruction project was taking place despite Penn Central's continuous financial despair throughout the 1970s, which forced them to turn over their commuter service to the Metropolitan Transportation Authority. MTA transferred the station to Metro-North in 1983.

For the 2006 U.S. Open golf tournament at the nearby Winged Foot Golf Club, the usually local Mamaroneck station temporarily became an express station.

The station building was closed October 9, 2007, by its owner Metro-North Railroad after removal of the ticket agent and in preparation for its sale. Tickets are now sold through a ticket vending machine located adjacent to the platform. The station building was subsequently sold in February 2008 for $1.25 Million to Verco Properties, a Bronx real estate investment company. The station building was converted to a lower-level restaurant (accessible from lower-level parking and from the tunnel from the outbound platform) and upper-level commercial office (accessible from track-level parking). The restaurant opened as "Club Car" in 2012, closing in 2015. After a brief renovation, the restaurant re-opened later in 2015 as "Modern on the Rails." Nevertheless, the station is recognized as a local historic landmark, along with the site of the original NY&NH station.
