= Albert E. and Emily Wilson House =

Historic house in New York, United States

- U.S. National Register of Historic Places
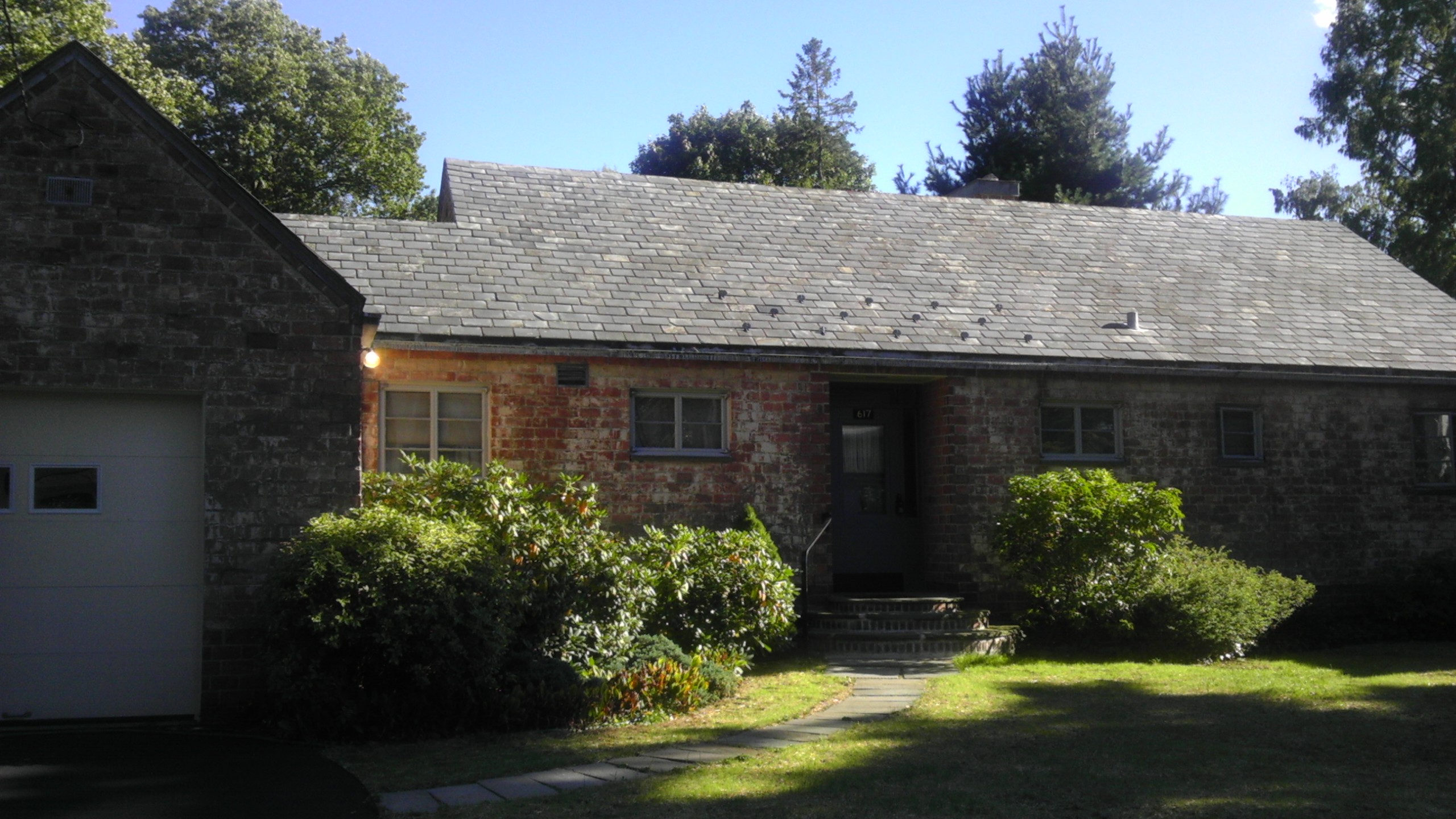

- Location within New York Location within the United States
- Location: 617 Brook St., Mamaroneck, New York
- Coordinates: 40°57′18″N 73°43′44″W
- Area: less than one acre
- Built: 1949-1951
- Architect: Wilson, Albert E.
- Architectural style: Colonial Revival
- NRHP reference No.: 07000330
- Added to NRHP: April 18, 2007

Albert E. and Emily Wilson House is a historic residence situated in Mamaroneck, Westchester County, New York. Constructed between 1949 and 1951, this U-shaped, one-story Colonial Revival style residence features red brick construction with a low-pitched, gray slate gable roof. An office wing was added to the residence in 1953. The entry features a Dutch door flanked by small, steel casement windows. Designed by noted local architect Albert E. Wilson (1878–1955), the residence also served as his home. Wilson was a partner in the prestigious architectural firm of Peabody, Wilson, and Brown.

The residence was added to the National Register of Historic Places in 2007.

== See also ==
- National Register of Historic Places listings in southern Westchester County, New York
