= Mamaroneck Methodist Church =

Historic church in New York, United States

- U.S. National Register of Historic Places
- U.S. Historic district
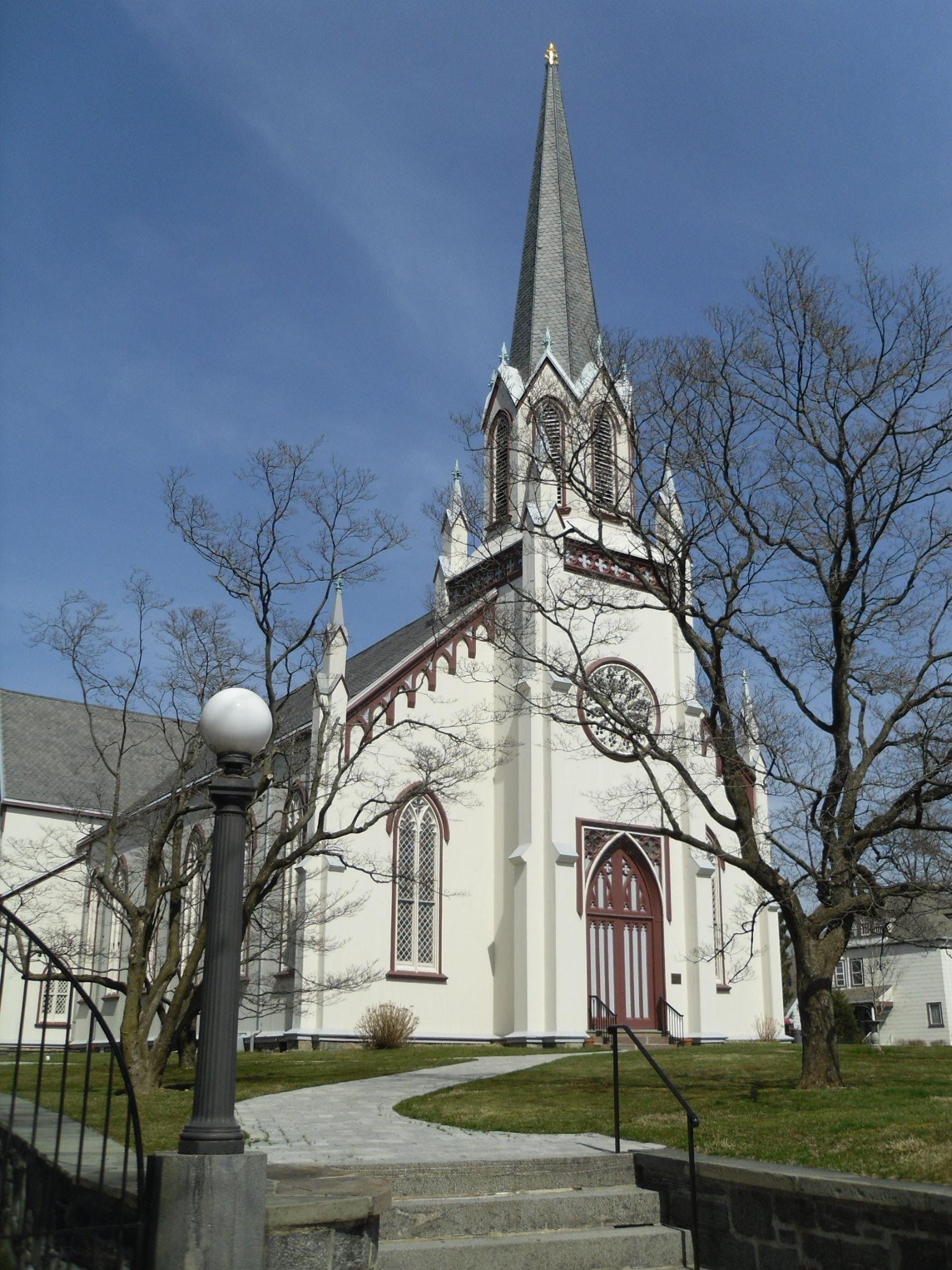
- Mamaroneck Methodist Church, March 2010

- Location within New York Location within the United States
- Location: 514 Boston Post Rd., Mamaroneck, New York
- Coordinates: 40°57′5″N 73°43′48″W
- Area: 1.6 acres (0.65 ha)
- Built: 1859
- Architect: Carreja, Mr.; Gedney, Solomon
- Architectural style: Classical Revival, Gothic Revival
- NRHP reference No.: 92001304
- Added to NRHP: October 2, 1992

Mamaroneck United Methodist Church is a historic Methodist church located at 546 East Boston Post Road in Mamaroneck, Westchester County, New York. It was built in 1859 and is a one-story, Gothic Revival style building of wood-frame construction with a gable roof. It is rectangular in form with a rear, two story, transecting wing built in 1869. It features a semi-engaged central tower flanked by stylized buttresses and topped by an octagonal spire.

It was added to the National Register of Historic Places in 1992.

== See also ==
- National Register of Historic Places listings in southern Westchester County, New York
