= Scarsdale Woman's Club =

- U.S. National Register of Historic Places
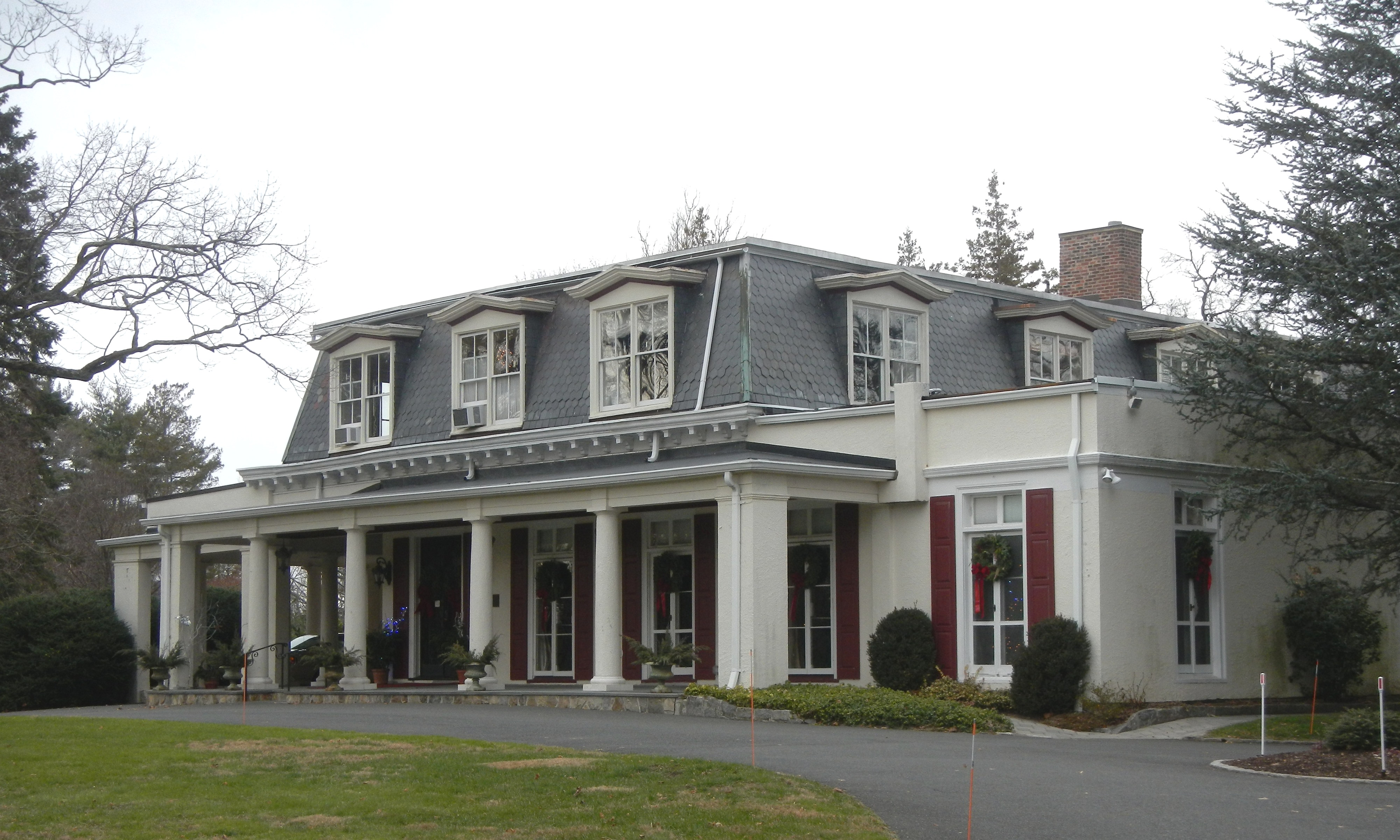

- Location within New York Location within the United States
- Location: 37 Drake Rd., Scarsdale, New York
- Coordinates: 40°59.26′0″N 73°47.55′0″W
- Area: 3.9 acres (1.6 ha)
- Built: 1858
- Architect: Upjohn, Hobart
- Architectural style: Second Empire, Late 19th And 20th Century Revivals
- NRHP reference No.: 08000110
- Added to NRHP: February 29, 2008

Scarsdale Woman's Club is a historic women's club located at Scarsdale, Westchester County, New York, United States. It was built in 1858 and expanded and remodeled in 1872 in the Second Empire style. It was again expanded and remodeled in 1941 by Hobart Upjohn. The former residence is a 1 1/2-story wood-frame building, clad in stucco, with a prominent mansard roof covered in red and blue hexagonal slate tiles. It features a five-bay open front porch supported by square and Doric order columns. It was acquired by the Scarsdale Woman's Club in 1928 for use as a clubhouse.

The building was added to the National Register of Historic Places in 2008.

The club operates as a 501(c)(3) Public Charity. In 2025 it claimed $300,749 in total revenue and $1,588,270 in total assets.

== See also ==
- Website
- National Register of Historic Places listings in southern Westchester County, New York
