= Sheldrake River =

Sheldrake River Branch Brook
- Location of the mouth of the Sheldrake River in New York State Sheldrake River (the United States)

Location
- Country: United States
- State: New York
- County: Westchester
- Municipalities: New Rochelle, Scarsdale, Mamaroneck

Physical characteristics
- Source
  - location: White Plains
  - coordinates: 40°59′52″N 73°46′08″W
- Mouth: Mamaroneck River
  - location: Mamaroneck
  - coordinates: 40°57′17″N 73°44′11″W
- Length: 6 mi (9.7 km)

The Sheldrake River is a freshwater stream located in Southern Westchester County, New York. The river forms in White Plains and flows six miles (9.7 km) south until it joins the Mamaroneck River. Approximately 1.58 miles (2.54 km) of the Sheldrake River flow through Scarsdale, 2.13 miles (3.43 km) through New Rochelle and two miles (3.2 km) through the Town of Mamaroneck.

The Sheldrake River is the largest tributary of the Mamaroneck River, which flows into Long Island Sound. The Sheldrake River watershed drains approximately 6.1 square miles (16 km^{2}) and comprises the upper Sheldrake River (north of Sheldrake Lake) and lower Sheldrake River (south of Sheldrake Lake), the east branch, the main tributary to the east branch, and various smaller tributary streams. The Sheldrake River drainage system encompasses part of Mamaroneck Town, New Rochelle, Scarsdale, and a minor portion of White Plains.

== Geography ==
From its origin, the river flows south through a medium-density upscale residential neighborhood. The river then enters a culvert running partly under Fenway Golf Course, where it re-surfaces and drains into Fenway Pond. From the pond, the river flows south/southwest past the Heathcote Five Corners intersection from Scarsdale to New Rochelle, eventually ending up in Carpenter Pond. The river flows over the dam at Carpenter Pond, where it widens to an average width of 15 feet and then flows south under the Hutchinson River Parkway and along Pine Brook Boulevard for approximately 1.5 miles (2.4 km) where it enters Sheldrake Lake. The river is fed from the reservoir over a spillway into the adjacent Goodliffe Pond.

A dam and spillway at the south end of Goodliffe Pond drains into a seven-foot-wide (2.1 m) channel that flows east through the Bonnie-Briar Golf Course. From Goodliffe Pond, the Sheldrake River flows through Mamaroneck Town nearly parallel to Weaver Street and south to Valley Stream Road. At this point, the Sheldrake River is joined by the east branch. The Sheldrake River flows through a series of small waterfalls to Gardens Lake (also known as the Duck Pond); Gardens Lake is circular in shape and approximately 200 feet (61 m) wide. Downstream from Gardens Lake, the river turns northeast through an industrial section of Mamaroneck Village and carried in culverts underneath the Interstate 95, joining the Mamaroneck River just south of the interstate at Columbus Park in Mamaroneck Village business district.

The East Branch of the Sheldrake River originates in Scarsdale and flows south through the Quaker Ridge Golf Club and Bonnie-Briar Country Club to meet the east tributary at Fenimore Road. Below Fenimore Road, the east branch flows through Rockland Avenue to meet the Sheldrake River below Valley Stream Road.

The Sheldrake River and east branch have been classified by the New York State Department of Environmental Conservation as Class C. According to this state water quality classification, Class C watercourses should be suitable for fishing and fish propagation and discharges to these watercourses must meet standards that enable those uses. Class C watercourses also are suitable for primary and secondary contact recreation even though other factors may limit the use for that purpose. Water quality standards for Class C watercourses include limitations on fecal coliform, pH, total dissolved solids, and dissolved oxygen.

== See also ==
- List of New York rivers
