= St. Vito's Church (Mamaroneck, New York) =

Catholic parish church

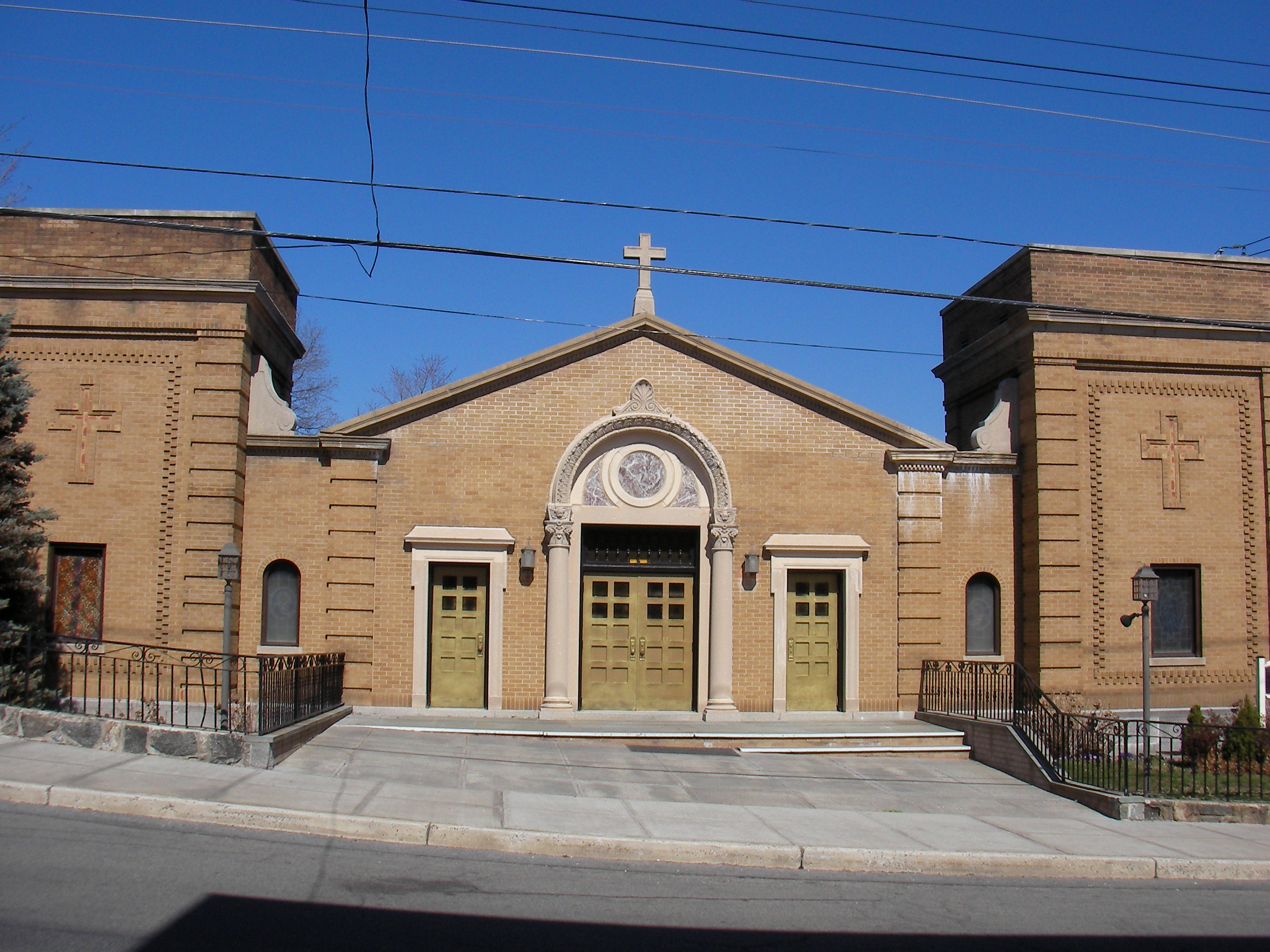
- St. Vito's Church
- 40°57′26.7″N 73°44′27.7″W
- Location: Mamaroneck, New York
- Denomination: Catholic Church
- Website: stvitochurch.com

History
- Status: Parish church
- Founded: 1911
- Dedication: Saint Vito

Architecture
- Functional status: Regular use
- Style: Roman

Administration
- Archdiocese: Archdiocese of New York
- Parish: Most Holy Trinity-Saint Vito

Clergy
- Archbishop: Timothy Cardinal Dolan
- Pastor: Msgr. James E. White

St. Vito's Church in Mamaroneck, New York is a Catholic Church in the Latin Church parish of Most Holy Trinity-Saint Vito in the Archdiocese of New York. It is the parish church of the Parish of St. Vito and Most Holy Trinity.

== History ==
The parish of Saint Vito's was founded in 1911 to serve the Italian Catholic community of Mamaroneck, which prior to this, was attended by priests from Our Lady of Mount Carmel in White Plains. Eventually, a small chapel dedicated to St. Anthony of Padua was constructed at Sheldrake Place.

In 1908 Father Ferdinand Papale became the first resident priest and efforts were made to build a permanent church. Dedicated to St. Vito, it opened in April 1910. Designed by Anthony J. DePace, the new church building was completed in 1930.

Father Del Negro was followed by Monsignor John Goodwine, who undertook the construction of a school, parish hall and a renovated convent. The church was heavily damaged in a flood that ravaged the Village of Mamaroneck in April 2007, but has since been restored.

To this day, the parish still maintains a large percentage of Italian-American parishioners. There are monthly devotions to Padre Pio every 4th Thursday at 7:30 p.m. The parish also holds an annual Festa Italiana in honor of its patron saint, which includes a procession with a statue of St. Vito. Once a month, Mass is celebrated in Italian. There is also a Mass in Spanish on Sundays. St. Vito's hosts the annual Mass before Mamaroneck's St. Patrick Day Parade.

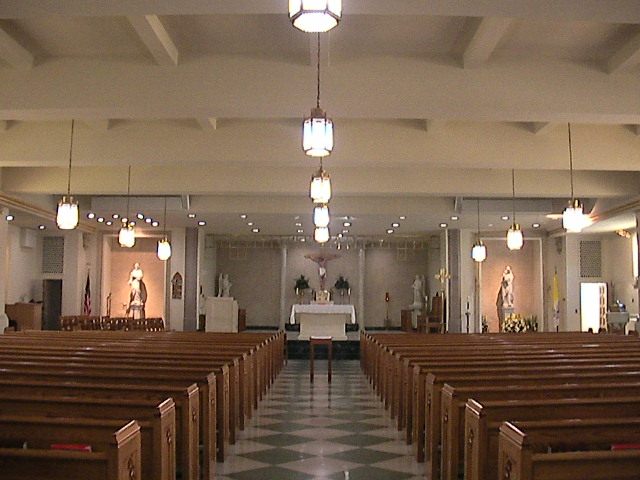
St.Vito's interior

=== School ===
Initially, the Sisters of the Divine Compassion from White Plains provided religious instruction to the children of the parish. They were later followed by the Sisters of Our Lady of Christian Doctrine. St. Vito's Parish School operated from 1962 to 1986 and was staffed by the Dominican Sisters of Sparkill.

=== Recent history ===
On November 2, 2014, the Archdiocese of New York announced as part of its "Making All Things New" round of church closures that the Parish of Saint Vito would be merged with the Parish Most Holy Trinity also located in Mamaroneck, New York. As of August 2015, the church is part of the newly formed parish of Most Holy Trinity-Saint Vito. The parish is served by the Knights of Columbus, Council 2247.

James E. White is the pastor of Most Holy Trinity-Saint Vito Parish.

On September 1, 2021, the church was again destroyed in a flood from the remnants of Hurricane Ida. The entire interior was submerged with several feet of water. Following the devastation, the church has not been used since.

== Pastors ==
- Francis Cocozza, 1910-1927
- Biaggio Del Negro, 1927-1959
- John Goodwine, 1959-present
