= St. Thomas' Episcopal Church Complex (Mamaroneck, New York) =

Historic church in New York, United States

- U.S. National Register of Historic Places
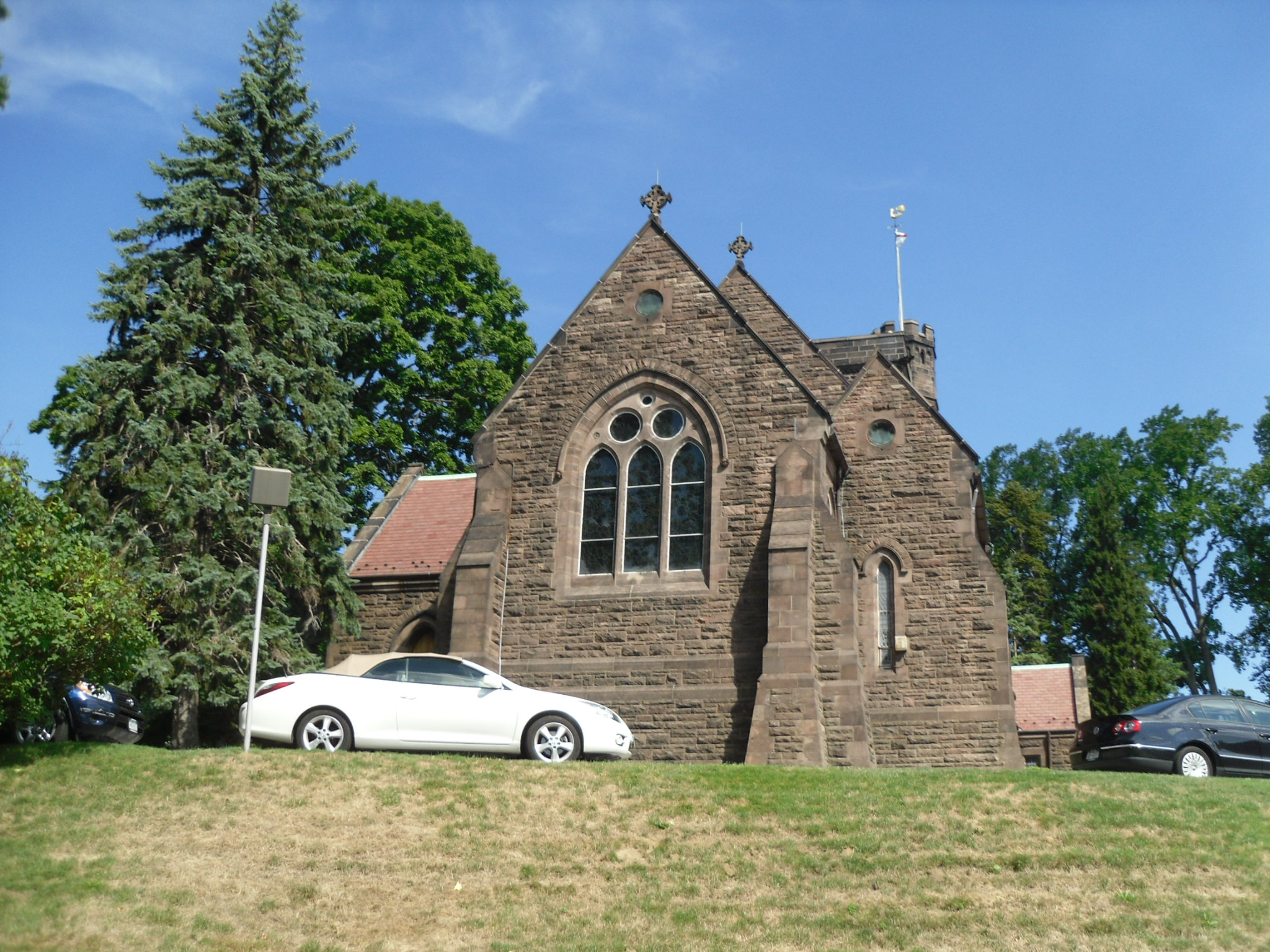
- St. Thomas' Episcopal Church, July 2010

- Location within New York Location within the United States
- Location: 158-168 W. Boston Post Rd., Mamaroneck, New York
- Coordinates: 40°56′53″N 73°44′6″W
- Area: 2.6 acres (1.1 ha)
- Built: 1884
- Architect: Bassett, Jones
- Architectural style: Gothic Revival
- NRHP reference No.: 03000242
- Added to NRHP: August 12, 2003

St. Thomas' Episcopal Church Complex is a historic Episcopal church complex at 158-168 W. Boston Post Road in Mamaroneck, Westchester County, New York. The complex, built between 1884 and 1925, comprises a cluster of four buildings. The Gothic Revival-style church is constructed entirely of rough-dressed Belleville brownstone with a red slate gable roof. It features a square tower on the north facade with clock faces and louvres. The tower consists of three gargoyles and a grotesque. The property also includes the Parish House / Chapel (1884-1886), Endowment Building (1887), and Heathcote Hall (1925).

It was added to the National Register of Historic Places in 2003.

== See also ==
- National Register of Historic Places listings in southern Westchester County, New York
- St. Thomas' Church, Mamaroneck, NY
