= Customart Press =

The Customart Press was a company based in Mamaroneck, New York. It published wanted ads magazines from 1945 until 1996. Its most famous publication, Lottery News, began in 1983, and was printed weekly until the end of 2001. There was also a short-lived Powerball Weekly. The company was in a long, steady decline before September 11, 2001, which seriously undermined the company.

Lottery columnists included Gail Howard, and Stan Roseq, a.k.a. "The Rose Knows".
