= Mamaroneck (village), New York =

Mamaroneck, New York
- Village
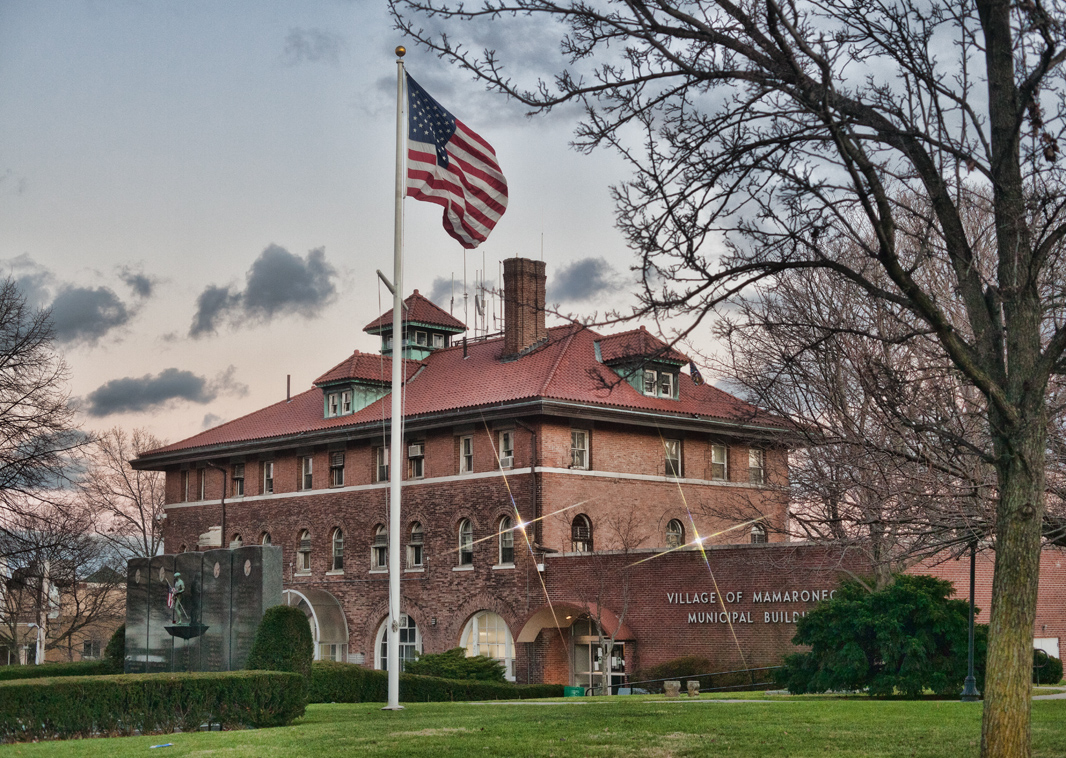
- Village Municipal Building

- Seal
- Nickname: The Friendly Village
- Location of Mamaroneck (village), New York
- Coordinates: 40°56′57″N 73°44′1″W
- Country: United States
- State: New York
- County: Westchester
- Town: Mamaroneck, Rye (Rye Neck)

Area
  - Total: 6.61 sq mi (17.13 km^{2})
  - Land: 3.21 sq mi (8.31 km^{2})
  - Water: 3.41 sq mi (8.82 km^{2})
- Elevation: 0 ft (0 m)

Population (2020)
  - Total: 20,151
  - Density: 6,279.3/sq mi (2,424.44/km^{2})
- Time zone: UTC-5 (Eastern (EST))
  - Summer (DST): UTC-4 (EDT)
- ZIP code: 10543
- Area code: 914
- FIPS code: 36-44831
- GNIS feature ID: 0977362
- Website: Village of Mamaroneck

Mamaroneck (/məˈmærənɛk/, mə-MAIR-ə-nek) is a village in Westchester County, New York, United States. The population was 18,929 at the 2010 census. As of 2019, its population was an estimated 19,131. It is located partially within the town of Mamaroneck and partially within the town of Rye. The portion in Rye is unofficially called "Rye Neck". The Rye Neck Union Free School District contains the Rye Neck portion of Mamaroneck and part of the city of Rye.

== History ==
Originally, the farming community of Mamaroneck was located on two sides of the Mamaroneck River. In the 1890s, the two areas surrounding the river were joined into one commercial village, Mamaroneck, which was incorporated in 1895. The eastern side of the village lies in the town of Rye and is known as Rye Neck. Some controversy surrounded the incorporation of the village, but the State Appellate Court approved the village's election status. The population of Mamaroneck village in 1895 was 1,500.

Along with the other shore communities of Westchester, Mamaroneck was at one time the location of summer residences for wealthy families from New York City. Summer residence neighborhoods included Greenhaven, Orienta and Shore Acres. The local railroad from New York City (now Metro-North) began to serve the village in 1848. Currently, the village of Mamaroneck is a commuter town for individuals working in Manhattan. A harbor on the Long Island Sound supports facilities for pleasure boating and is the location of Harbor Island Park, a large public park with beach and sporting facilities.

The main commercial streets in Mamaroneck are the Boston Post Road (U.S. Route 1) and Mamaroneck Avenue, the site of several annual parades. Local industry is centered on Fenimore Road.

Other areas of the town include Heathcote Hill, overlooking the harbor, Harbor Heights (the heights) to the northeast, Old Rye Neck (settled in the 1880s), Rye Neck (settled in the 1920s and 1930s), Orienta, and Washingtonville, better known as "The Flats", due to the flat, low-lying topography of the area.

=== Historic sites on National register of Historic Places (NRHP) ===
- Mamaroneck Methodist Church
- St. Thomas' Episcopal Church Complex
- Walter's Hot Dog Stand
- Mamaroneck's "Skinny House"
- Albert E. and Emily Wilson House

== Geography ==
According to the United States Census Bureau, the village has a total area of 6.7 square miles (17 km^{2}), of which 3.2 square miles (8.3 km^{2}) is land and 3.5 square miles (9.1 km^{2}), or 52%, is water.

Intersection of Mamaroneck Avenue and the Boston Post Road

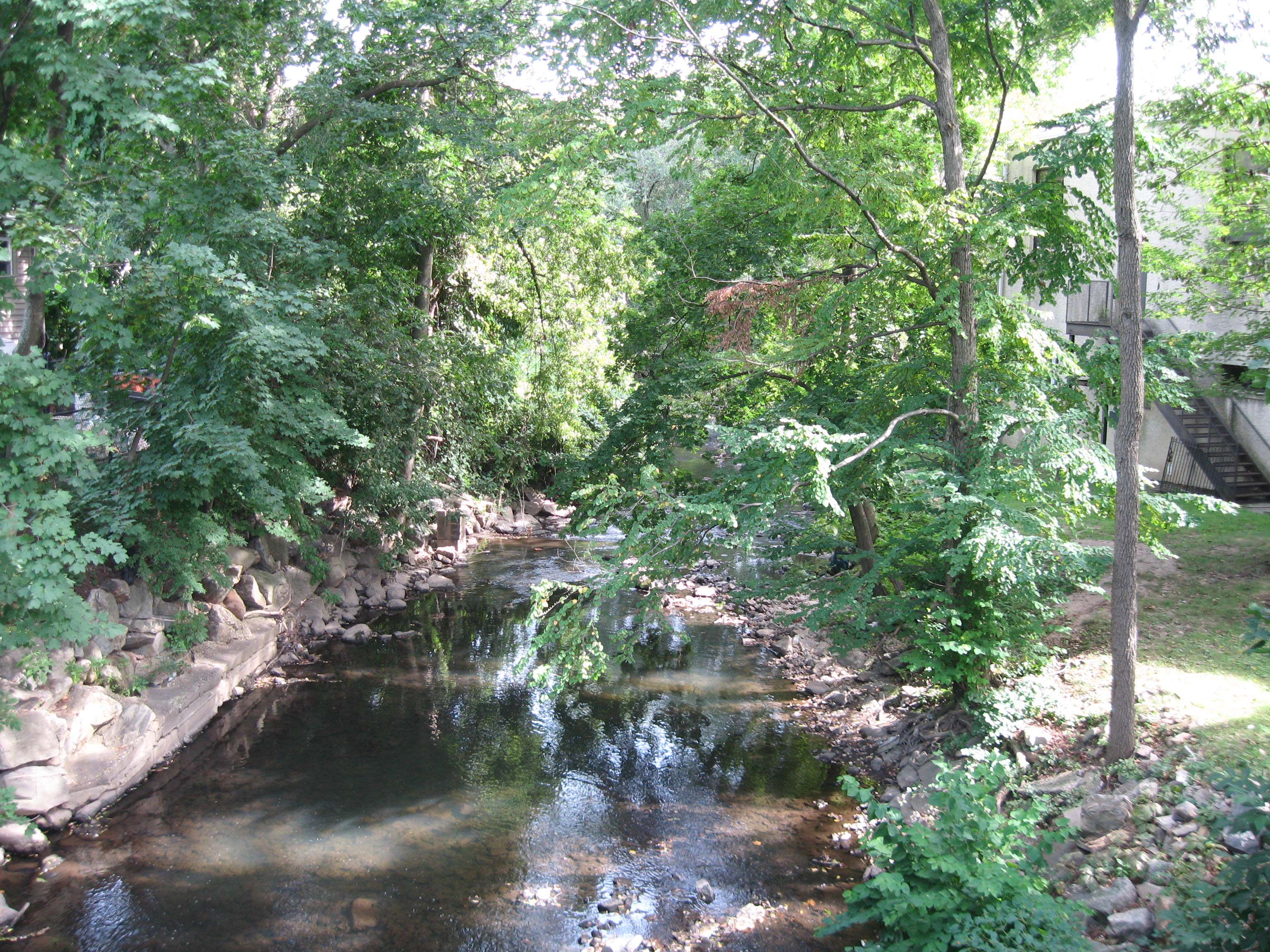
The Mamaroneck River flows south of Halstead Avenue

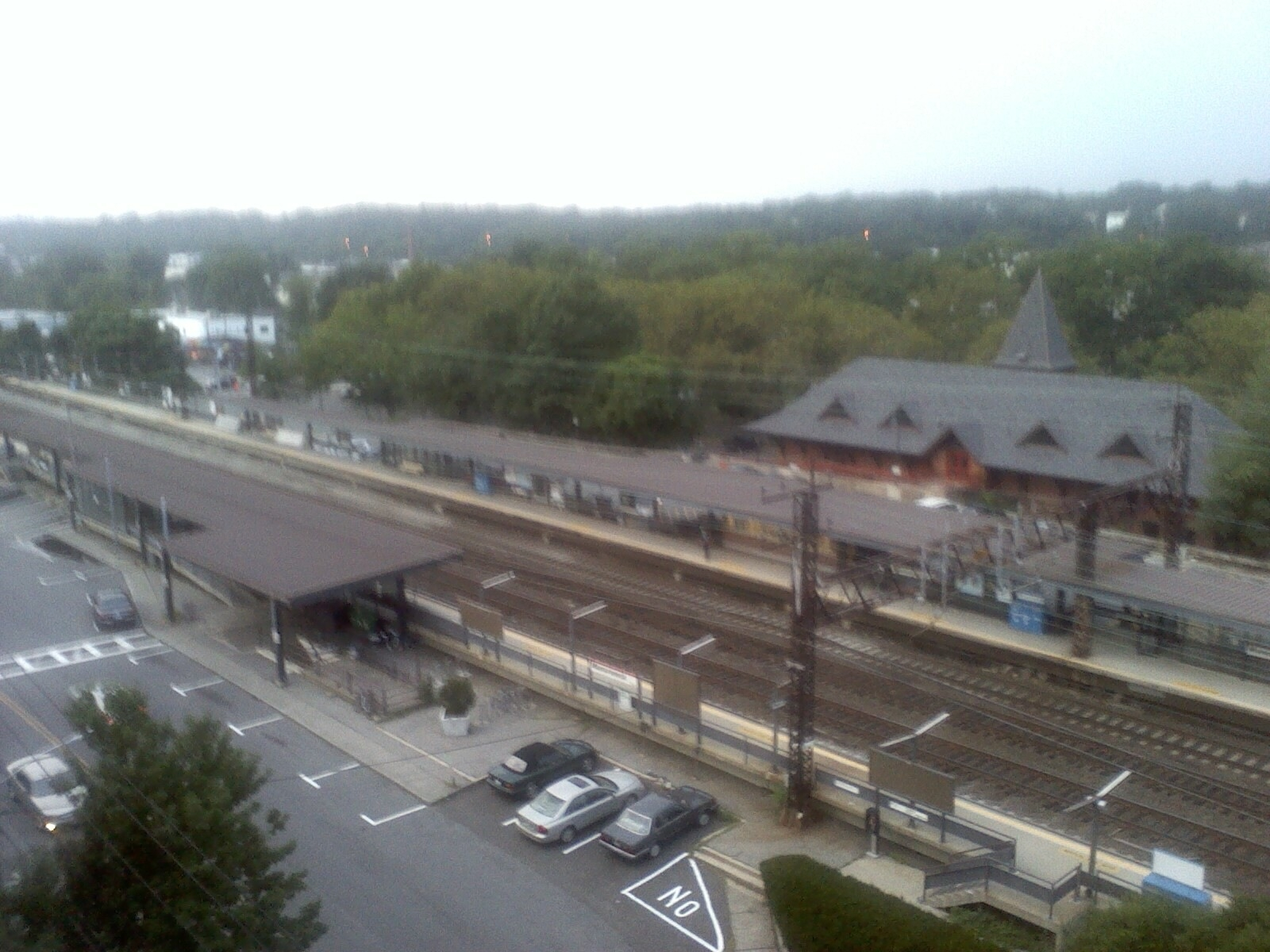
Mamaroneck train station

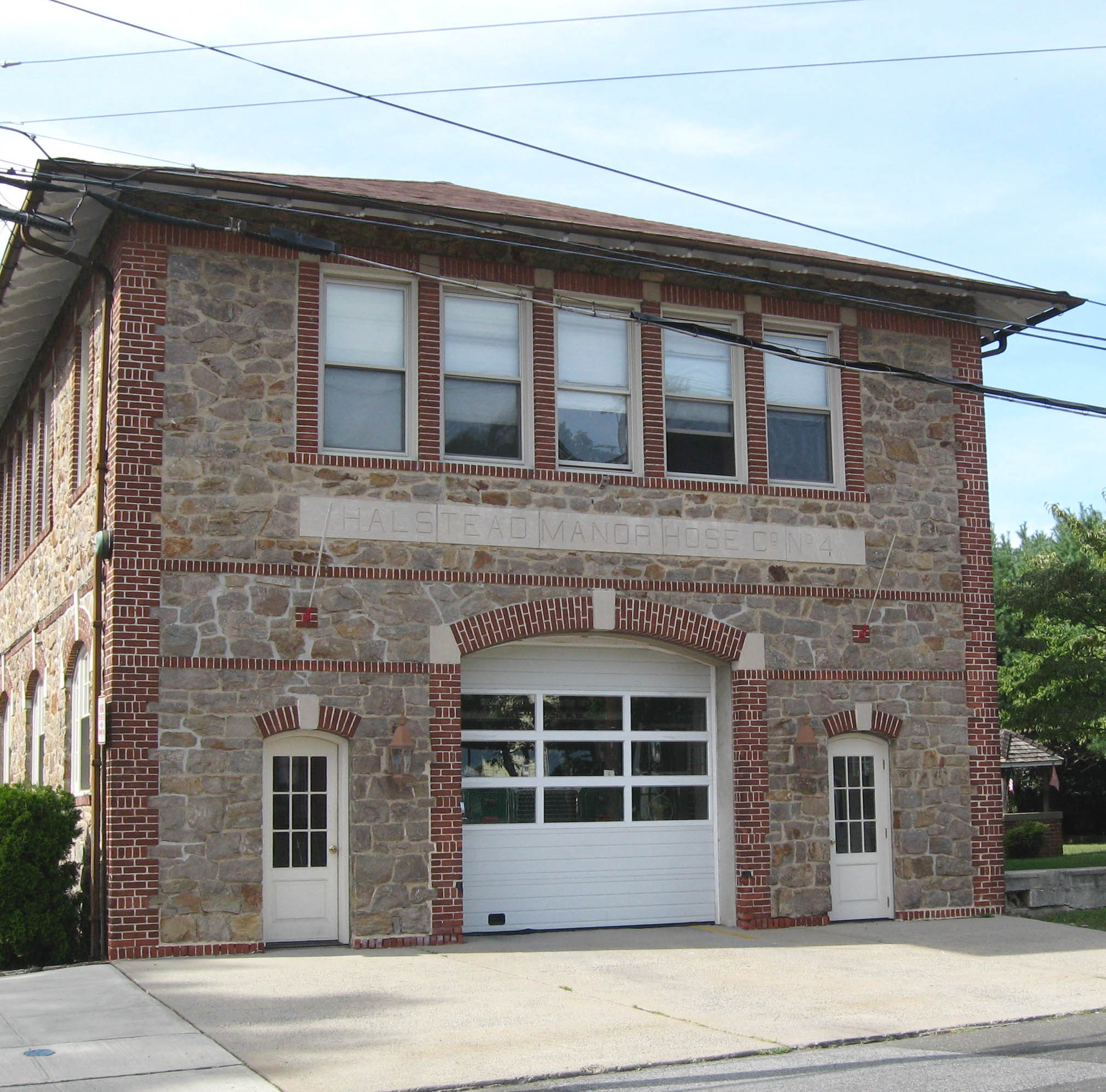
Halstead Manor Fire Station of Mamaroneck Fire Department

== Demographics ==
Historical population
Census	Pop.	Note	%±
1910	5,699		—
1920	6,571		15.3%
1930	11,766		79.1%
1940	13,034		10.8%
1950	15,016		15.2%
1960	17,673		17.7%
1970	18,909		7.0%
1980	17,616		−6.8%
1990	17,325		−1.7%
2000	18,752		8.2%
2010	18,929		0.9%
2020	20,151		6.5%
U.S. Decennial Census

As of the census of 2010, there were 18,929 people living in the village. The population density was 5,799.4 inhabitants per square mile (2,239.2/km^{2}). There were 7,353 housing units at an average density of 2,274.1 per square mile (878.0/km^{2}). The racial makeup of the village was 65.3% White, 3.7% Black or African American, 0.1% Native American, 4.8% Asian, 0.03% Pacific Islander, 0.4% from other races, and 1.4% from two or more races. Hispanic or Latino of any race were 24.3% of the population.

There were 6,920 households, out of which 35.4% had children under the age of 18 living with them, 52.3% were married couples living together, 10.9% had a female householder with no husband present, and 33.6% were non-families. 28.1% of all households were made up of individuals, and 11.4% had someone living alone who was 65 years of age or older. The average household size was 2.66 and the average family size was 3.28.

In the village, the population was spread out, with 24% under the age of 18, 6.5% from 18 to 24, 32.0% from 25 to 44, 22.2% from 45 to 64, and 16.1% who were 65 years of age or older. The median age was 40.2 years. For every 100 females, there were 92.0 males. For every 100 females age 18 and over, there were 88.2 males.

The median income for a household in the village was $86,307, and the median income for a family was $97,813. Males had a median income of $65,2563 versus $56,353 for females. The per capita income for the village was $52,750. About 4.2% of families and 6.9% of the population were below the poverty line, including 6.7% of those under age 18 and 9.0% of those age 65 or over.

=== Nationalities ===
Mamaroneck Village residents represent more than 70 nationalities, including 30 from Europe, 20 from Latin America, seven from Asia and six from the Middle East, and five from Africa, according to the U.S. Census Bureau's American Community Survey for 2015–19, via the National Historical Geographic Information System (nhgis.org) and detailed on the Mamaroneck Historical Society's website.

==== Largest nationalities ====
As of 2019, the top 10 nationalities by size and their estimated village population were:

1. Italian: 4,131
2. Irish: 2,261
3. Guatemalan: 1,505
4. American (United States): 1,111
5. German: 1,087
6. Mexican: 911
7. English: 869
8. Puerto Rican: 648
9. French: 517
10. Peruvian: 476

About one-third of survey respondents who reported ancestry reported multiple ancestries. Sixteen percent didn't report ancestry or their answer was unclassified in one of the groups the Census Bureau listed.

==== Fastest growing nationalities ====
The 10 nationalities that grew fastest in Mamaroneck Village from 2010 to 2019 were:

1. Guatemalan: +647, to a population of 1,505 in 2019
2. Irish: +466, to 2,261
3. Japanese: +211, to 474
4. English: +184, to 869
5. Sudanese: +164, to 164
6. El Salvadoran: +163, to 328
7. Dominican Republic: +140, to 239
8. French: +120, to 517
9. Brazilian: +117, to 322
10. Hungarian: +94, to 211

== Education ==
The Village of Mamaroneck contains portions of two public school districts. As noted above, the northern and eastern parts of the village form part of the Rye Neck Union Free School District; the other part of the Rye Neck Union Free School District lies in the southern portion of the city of Rye. The southern and western parts of the village form part of the Mamaroneck Union Free School District; the remainder of the Mamaroneck Union Free School District covers all of the village of Larchmont, as well as most of the Town of Mamaroneck's unincorporated areas.

Private schools:

- French-American School of New York
- Westchester Hebrew High School — litigation between this school and the village was resolved in 2010.

== Fire Department ==
The village of Mamaroneck is protected by five all-volunteer fire companies of the Village of Mamaroneck Fire Department (VMFD) that operate out of four fire stations, located throughout the village. The combined volunteer fire companies operate a total of five engines (including one spare engine), two trucks, two utility units and three command vehicles. The combined volunteer fire companies respond to approximately 1,000 emergency calls annually.

=== Fire station locations and apparatus ===
Company	Engine	Ladder	Special Unit	Address	Neighborhood
Mamaro Engine & Hose Co. 1, Mamaroneck Hook & Ladder Co. 1	Engine 40, Engine 39(Spare)	Tower Ladder 20, Ladder 21	Utility 90, Marine 2	146 Palmer Ave.	Downtown
Columbia Hose Co. 2	Engine 41			605 N. Barry Ave.	Barry Avenue
Volunteers Engine & Hose Co. 3	Engine 42, Utility 9			643 Mamaroneck Ave.	Downtown
Halstead Manor Hose Co. 4	Engine 38			1400 Halstead Ave.	Halstead Manor

== Mayors ==
- Sharon Torres, 2023–present
- Tom Murphy, 2017–2023
- Norman Rosenblum, 2009–2017
- Kathy Savolt, 2007–2009
- Philip Trifiletti, 2001–2007
- Deborah Chapin, 1999–2001
- Joseph Lanza, 1994–1999
- Paul Noto, 1985–1994
- Robert Funicello 1985
- Suzi Oppenheimer 1977–1985
- Arthur C. Phillips, 1965–1977
- Joseph L.Dalfonso, 1957–1964
- Edwin B. Dooley, 1950–1956
- Battista Santoro, ?–1950

== Economy ==
- Archie Comics was headquartered in the village and the town of Mamaroneck until 2015.
- Marval Industries is a manufacturer of plastics, employing about 70 people. It is one of a very few businesses along Metro-North Railroad's New Haven Line having an active siding for freight usage.

== Notable people ==
- Norman Rockwell lived in Mamaroneck from 1903 to 1912
- James Fenimore Cooper lived in Mamaroneck
- Kevin Dillon grew up in Mamaroneck
- Matt Dillon grew up in Mamaroneck
- Edwin B. Dooley, former US Congressman
- Henry Flagler, oil, hotels and railroad baron, circa 1877
- Cat Greenleaf, news reporter and host of NBC's Talk Stoop
- D. W. Griffith, silent film director, lived in Mamaroneck for a few years in the 1920s
- William Kunstler, radical lawyer and civil rights activist; lived on West Street (Note: Kunstler threw the first reunion at his Mamaroneck home)
- Scott Leius, baseball player, lived in Mamaroneck
- Mary Mallon, known commonly as Typhoid Mary, an Irish-born American cook believed to have infected many people with typhoid fever, lived in Mamaroneck in 1900
- Ethel Barrymore, Broadway/film actress, sister of John Barrymore and great aunt of Drew Barrymore
- John McVitty, racing driver, was born in Mamaroneck
- Robert Ripley had a home on BION (Believe It Or Not) Island
- David Spinozza (studio guitarist, producer, and conductor) grew up in Mamaroneck Lane
- Lee Stringer, author, longtime and current resident
- Gary Young, first drummer of the '90s alternative band Pavement
- Lina Khan, the 56th chair of the FTC, went to junior and senior high school in Mamaroneck

== Local points of interest ==
- Emelin Theatre
- Most Holy Trinity Church
- Mamaroneck Riot
- Battle of Mamaroneck
- Mamaroneck Union Free School District
- Rye Neck Union Free School District
- Mamaroneck High School
- Rye Neck High School
- St. Vito's Church
- Mamaroneck Public Library
- Mamaroneck (Metro-North station)
- One Room School House
- Cooper/DeLancey House (1811)

=== Cemeteries ===
- DeLancey Burial Ground
- Disbrow Burial Ground
- Eleazor Gedney Burial Ground
- Florence-Powell Burial Ground
- Griffen Rogers Burial Ground
- Guion Burial Ground
- Richbell Cemetery
- Solomon Gedney Burial Ground
- Old Town of Mamaroneck Cemetery

== See also ==
- The Customart Press
- Rye Brook
- Port Chester
