= Mamaroneck River =

Mamaroneck River Bonnie Brook, Merrimack River
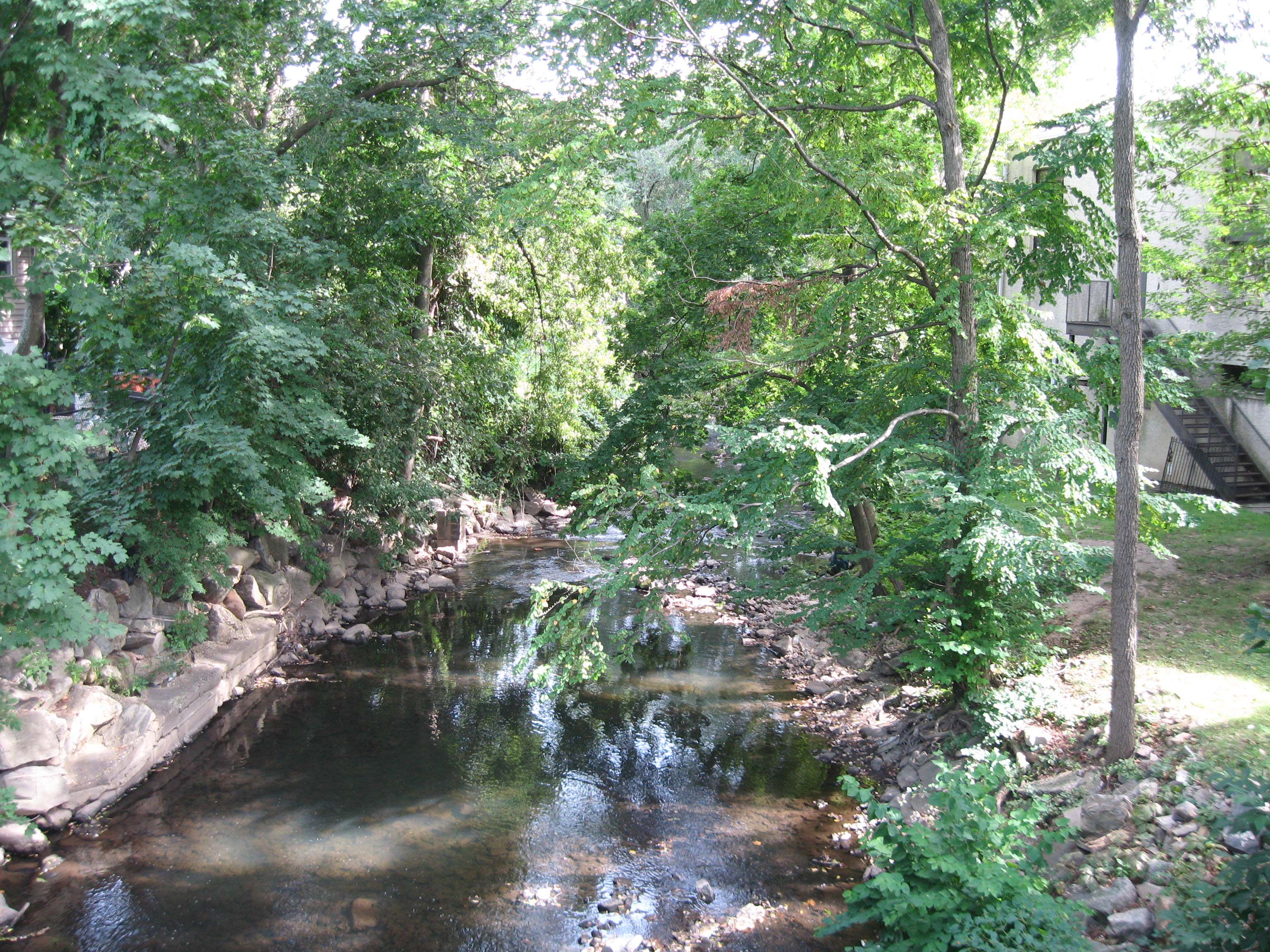
- Halstead Avenue, Mamaroneck

Location
- Country: United States
- State: New York
- District: Westchester County

Physical characteristics
- Source
  - location: White Plains, New York
  - coordinates: 41.04288°N 73.75236°W
- Source confluence: Sheldrake River
  - coordinates: 40.954914°N 73.736621°W
- Mouth: Long Island Sound
  - location: Mamaroneck, New York
  - coordinates: 40.9398209°N 73.7209638°W
- Basin size: 17.4 mi^{2} (45 km^{2})

The Mamaroneck River is a freshwater stream located in Southern Westchester County, New York. The river forms in White Plains and Harrison and flows 7.3 miles (11.7 km) south through Mamaroneck Town and Village, where it empties into Mamaroneck Harbor and Long Island Sound. The name of the river comes from a local native American word meaning, "where the fresh water meets the salt water." The river flows into Long Island Sound.

The watershed of the Mamaroneck River is 17.4 sq mi (45 km^{2}). It is dominated by suburban residential neighborhoods and commercial and retail tracts. High density residential development also is prevalent throughout the middle and lower portions of the watershed.

== Detail ==
Originating 430 ft (130 m) above sea level in a small wetlands area in Harrison, the river flows south along the eastern boundary of White Plains. It joins the 'East Branch' near the junction of Anderson Hill Road and Westchester Avenue. The Mamaroneck River flows another 2.5 mi (4.0 km) to its confluence with the 'West Branch', where it forms the river's main stem. Human encroachment into the stream corridor and manipulation of the stream channel are byproducts of intense residential construction in and around the river's headwaters.

The main stem of the Mamaroneck River flows southeasterly, paralleling Westchester Avenue and the Hutchinson River Parkway. Below the parkway, the river flows south to its confluence with the West Branch of the Mamaroneck River at the Mamaroneck Reservoir. South of the reservoir, the river forms the municipal boundary between Mamaroneck Village and Harrison. At the New England Thruway, the Mamaroneck River flows southward through Mamaroneck Village, where it joins the Sheldrake River and finally emptying into Mamaroneck Harbor on Long Island Sound.

=== Tributaries ===
Besides the Sheldrake River, two principal tributaries enter the Mamaroneck River, one from the east and one from the west. The East Branch of the Mamaroneck River is the furthest upstream tributary and originates in north Harrison near the intersection of Westchester Avenue and Anderson Hill Road. The West Branch originates just south of the Hutchinson River Parkway near Mamaroneck Avenue.

The East Branch of the Mamaroneck River is 3.3 mi (5.3 km) long. The main stem is 1.9 mi (3.1 km) long north of its confluence with the east branch. The east branch originates from a small pond in north Harrison at about 400 ft (120 m) above sea level and then flowing southeast 0.7 mi (1.1 km) into Forest Lake. South of Forest Lake, it flows westerly to its confluence with the main stem.

The West Branch of the Mamaroneck River is the smallest of the Mamaroneck River's two primary tributaries, draining an area of 2.3 sq mi (6.0 km^{2}) just south and southeast of downtown White Plains. The west branch originates from a wetland and pond adjacent to Archbishop Stepinac High School on Mamaroneck Avenue and flows about 2.75 mi (4.43 km) south and southwest through several stormwater management basins to its confluence with the main stem near the intersection of Mamaroneck Avenue and Hutchinson River Parkway.

== See also ==
- List of New York rivers
- Kreek
