= Harrison station (Metro-North) =

Metro-North Railroad station in New York

Harrison
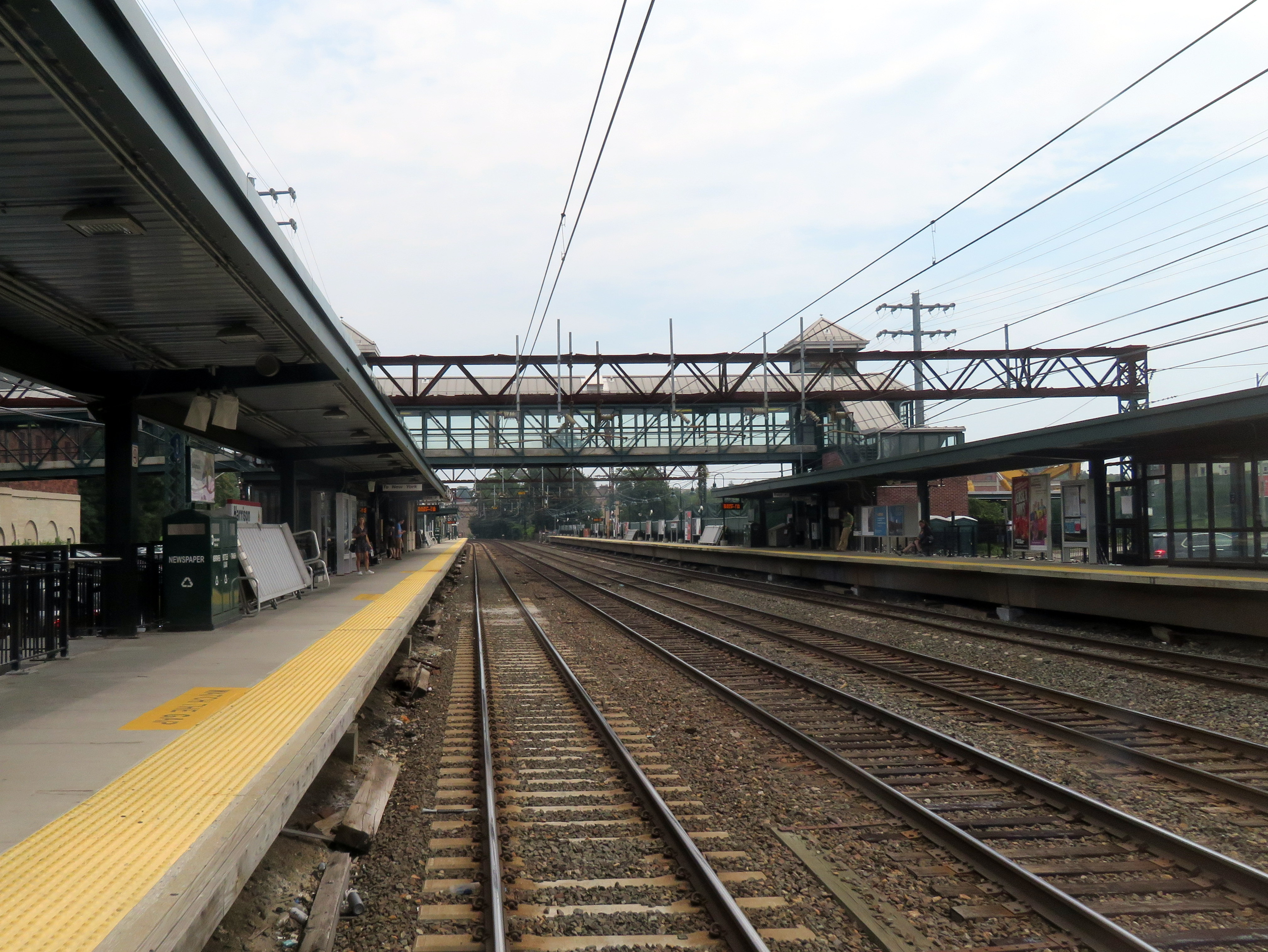
- Harrison station in July 2019

General information
- Location: 452 Halstead Avenue; Harrison, New York
- Coordinates: 40.970°N 73.711°W
- Owner: Metropolitan Transportation Authority
- Line: MTA New Haven Line (Northeast Corridor)
- Platforms: 2 side platforms
- Tracks: 4
- Connections: Bee-Line Bus System: 5, 61

Construction
- Parking: 927 spaces
- Accessible: Yes

Other information
- Fare zone: 13

History
- Opened: c. 1840s
- Rebuilt: c.1870s; 1972

Passengers
- 2018: 2,829 daily boardings

Services
Preceding station	Metro-North Railroad	Following station
Mamaroneck toward Grand Central	New Haven Line	Rye toward Stamford
Former services
Preceding station	New York, New Haven and Hartford Railroad	Following station
Mamaroneck toward New York	Main Line	Rye toward New Haven
Preceding station	New York, Westchester and Boston Railway	Following station
West Street toward Harlem River via Columbus Avenue	Port Chester Branch	Rye toward Port Chester
Location

Harrison station is a commuter rail station on the Metro-North Railroad New Haven Line, located in Harrison, New York, United States. During peak hours, some local trains (namely those not subsidized by the Connecticut Department of Transportation) originate or terminate here as opposed to locals from Stamford. The station has two high-level side platforms, each 10 cars long, serving the outer tracks of the four-track Northeast Corridor.

== History ==
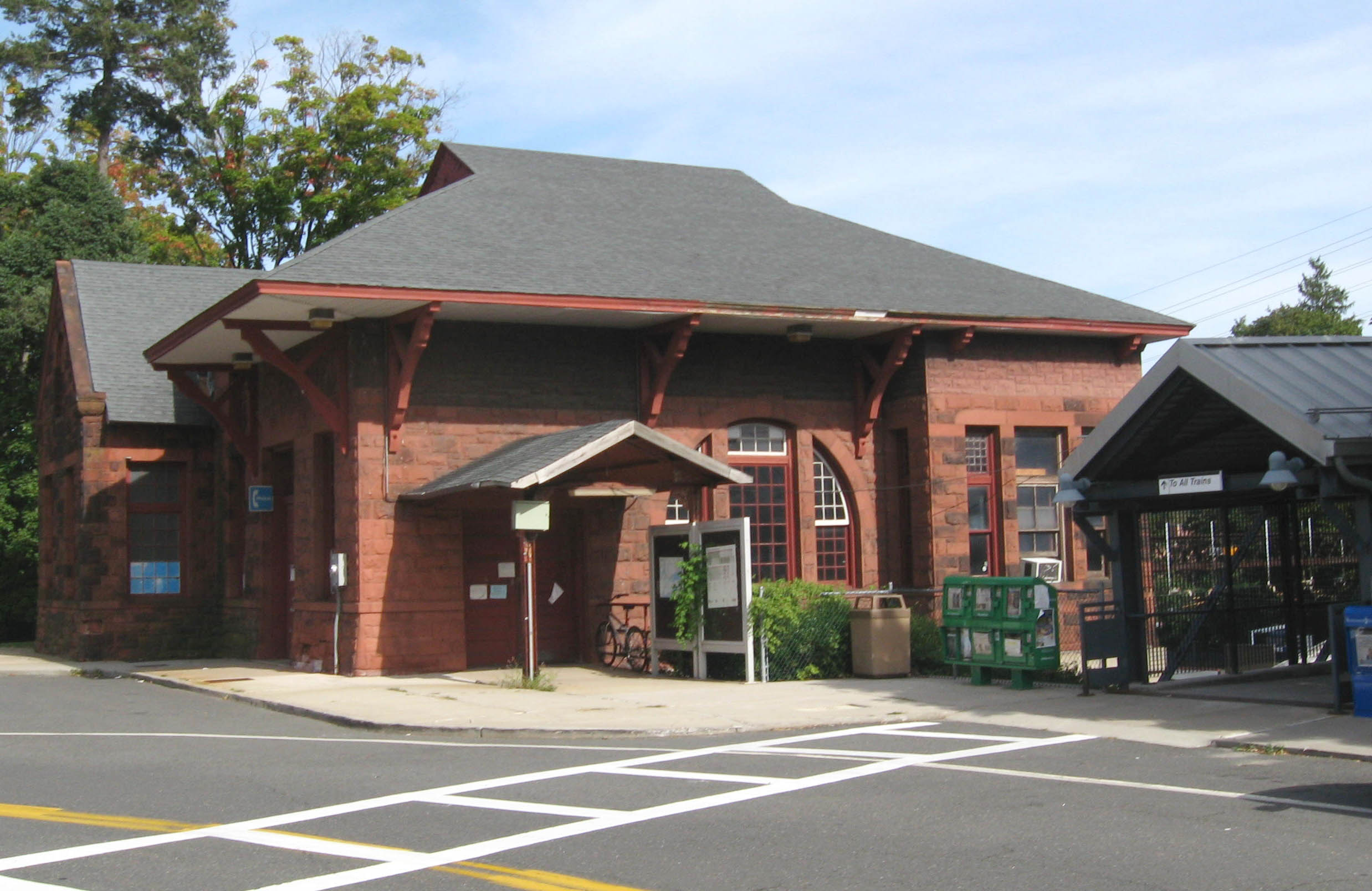
The former station building in 2008

Railroad service through Harrison dates back to the 1840s when the New York and New Haven Railroad laid tracks through the town. It was little more than a flag stop until NY&NE built a station in 1870, before the line was acquired by the New York, New Haven and Hartford Railroad in 1872. Between 1927 and 1937, it also served as a station for the New York, Westchester and Boston Railway (NYW&B), and was one of two stations in Harrison to serve the NYW&B, the other one was at West Street and lasted just as long.

As with all New Haven Line stations in Westchester County, the station became a Penn Central station upon acquisition by the Penn Central Railroad in 1969. The station was updated in 1972 from low-level to high-level platforms. This was done to accommodate the arrival of new rail cars known then as Cosmopolitans, now more commonly known as M2s. The new cars did not include boarding steps, or traps, as their predecessor 4400 Pullman "Washboard" cars did, and could board passengers only at stations with high-level platforms. This reconstruction project was taking place despite Penn Central's continuous financial despair throughout the 1970s, which forced them to turn over their commuter service to the Metropolitan Transportation Authority. MTA transferred the station to Metro-North in 1983.

On September 25, 2013, a main feeder cable that provides electricity to an 8-mile (13 km) long segment of the New Haven Line failed, causing electric train service over the line to halt. Consolidated Edison and Metro-North installed a temporary substation at Harrison on September 28 in an effort to help alleviate the outage for Monday's regular services. The MTA opened a 598 space parking garage at Harrison on August 26, 2021. A mixed-use transit-oriented development building opened adjacent to the station on August 7, 2023.
