= Larchmont station =

Metro-North Railroad station in New York

Larchmont
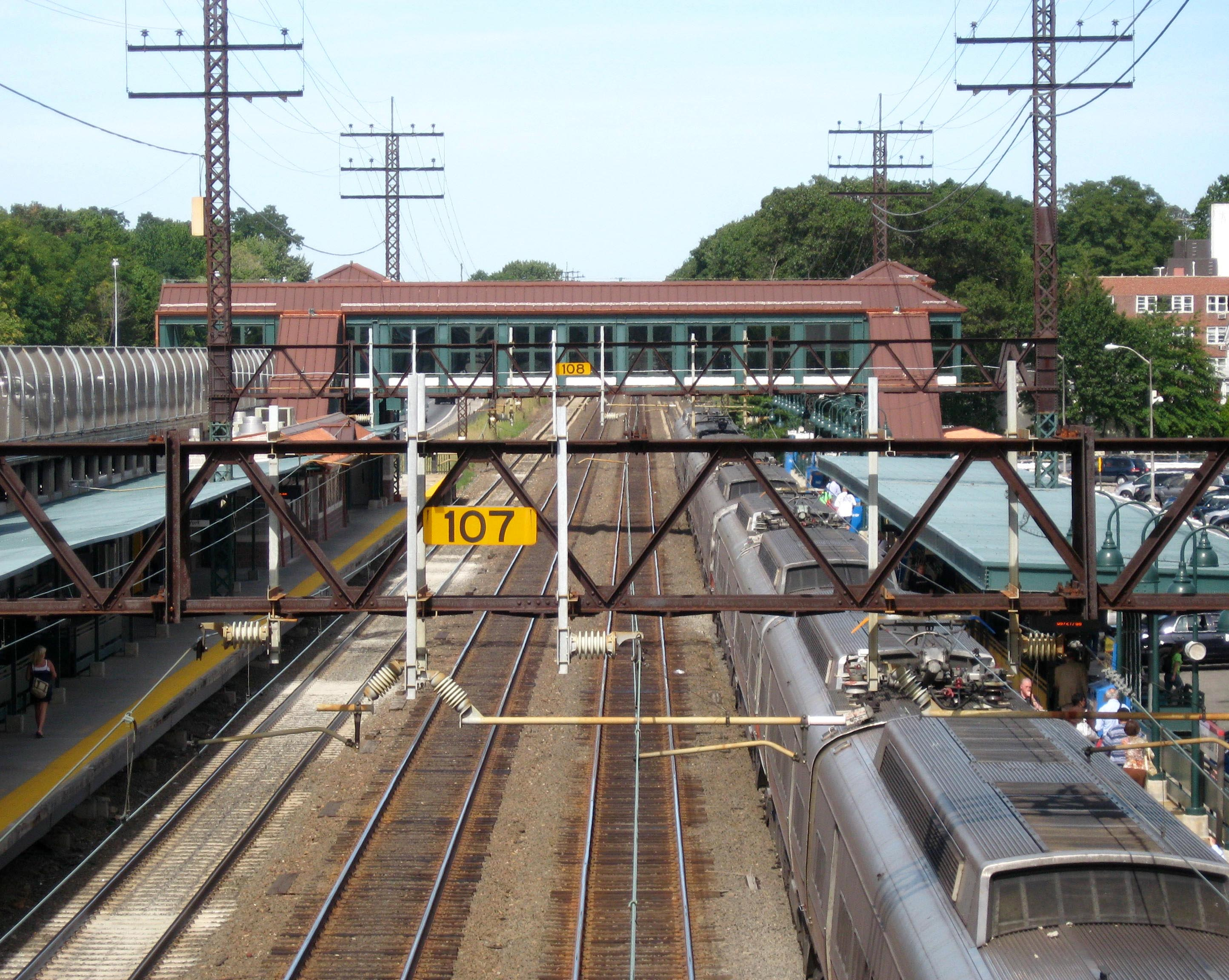
- Larchmont station in 2008

General information
- Location: 1 Railroad Way; Larchmont, New York
- Coordinates: 40.934444°N 73.759782°W
- Owner: Metropolitan Transportation Authority
- Line: MTA New Haven Line (Northeast Corridor)
- Platforms: 2 side platforms
- Tracks: 4
- Connections: Bee-Line Bus System: 60, 61, 66, 70, 71

Construction
- Parking: 1,015 spaces
- Cycle facilities: Yes
- Accessible: Yes

Other information
- Fare zone: 13

History
- Rebuilt: October 1959–June 21, 1960

Passengers
- 2018: 4,104 daily boardings

Services
Preceding station	Metro-North Railroad	Following station
New Rochelle toward Grand Central	New Haven Line	Mamaroneck toward Stamford
Former services
Preceding station	New York, New Haven and Hartford Railroad	Following station
New Rochelle toward New York	Main Line	Mamaroneck toward New Haven
Preceding station	New York, Westchester and Boston Railway	Following station
Pine Brook toward Harlem River via Columbus Avenue	Port Chester Branch	Larchmont Gardens toward Port Chester
Location

Larchmont station is a commuter rail station on the Metro-North Railroad New Haven Line, located in Larchmont, New York. The station has two high-level side platforms, each 10 cars long, serving the outer tracks of the four-track Northeast Corridor.

== History ==
Larchmont station was originally built by the New York and New Haven Railroad. It was rebuilt by the New York, New Haven and Hartford Railroad twice during the 20th century: first in the 1920s in order to facilitate a separate New York, Westchester and Boston Railway station, and again in 1959–1960 for construction of the New England Thruway.

As with all New Haven Line stations in Westchester County, the station became a Penn Central station upon acquisition by Penn Central in 1969, and eventually became part of the MTA's Metro-North Railroad.
