= Quaker Ridge station =

Railway station in New Rochelle, New York

Quaker Ridge
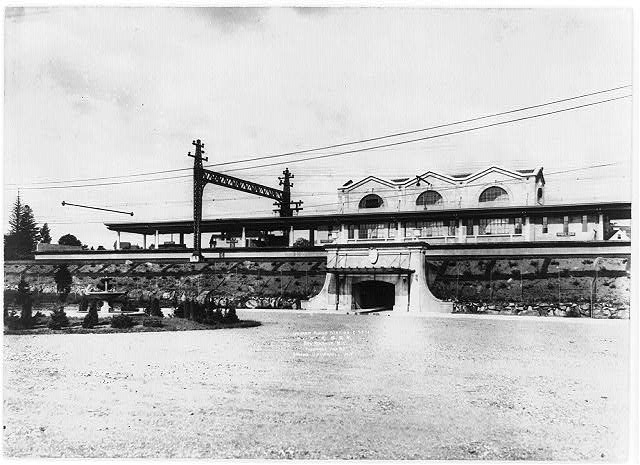

General information
- Location: 556 Stratton Road, New Rochelle, New York
- Coordinates: 40°58′20.55″N 73°46′36.11″W

Construction
- Architect: Stern & Fellheimer

History
- Opened: 1912

Former services
Preceding station	New York, Westchester and Boston Railway	Following station
Wykagyl toward Harlem River via Columbus Avenue	White Plains Branch	Heathcote toward White Plains
Location

Quaker Ridge station is a former railroad station on the White Plains branch of the New York, Westchester and Boston Railway in the city of New Rochelle in Westchester County, New York. The station is named for the Quaker Ridge section of northern New Rochelle along the Scarsdale Town border. It was constructed by the New York, Westchester & Boston commuter railroad which linked Manhattan with the less populous northern Bronx section of New York City and the primarily undeveloped countryside of Westchester County.

The station was State-determined eligible for the National Register of Historic Places but as of March 2015 is not listed there.

== Development ==
The Quaker Ridge property was seen as exceptionally well located for residential purposes. It was high, perfect in drainage, rolling in topography, and afforded magnificent views of Long Island Sound. Initially fifty acres of this property was surveyed and placed on the market. The property fronted on the Quaker Ridge Station, and intersected with wide, newly built drives and boulevards. The Quaker Ridge Improvement Company was later organized for further development of the surrounding area.

== Station ==
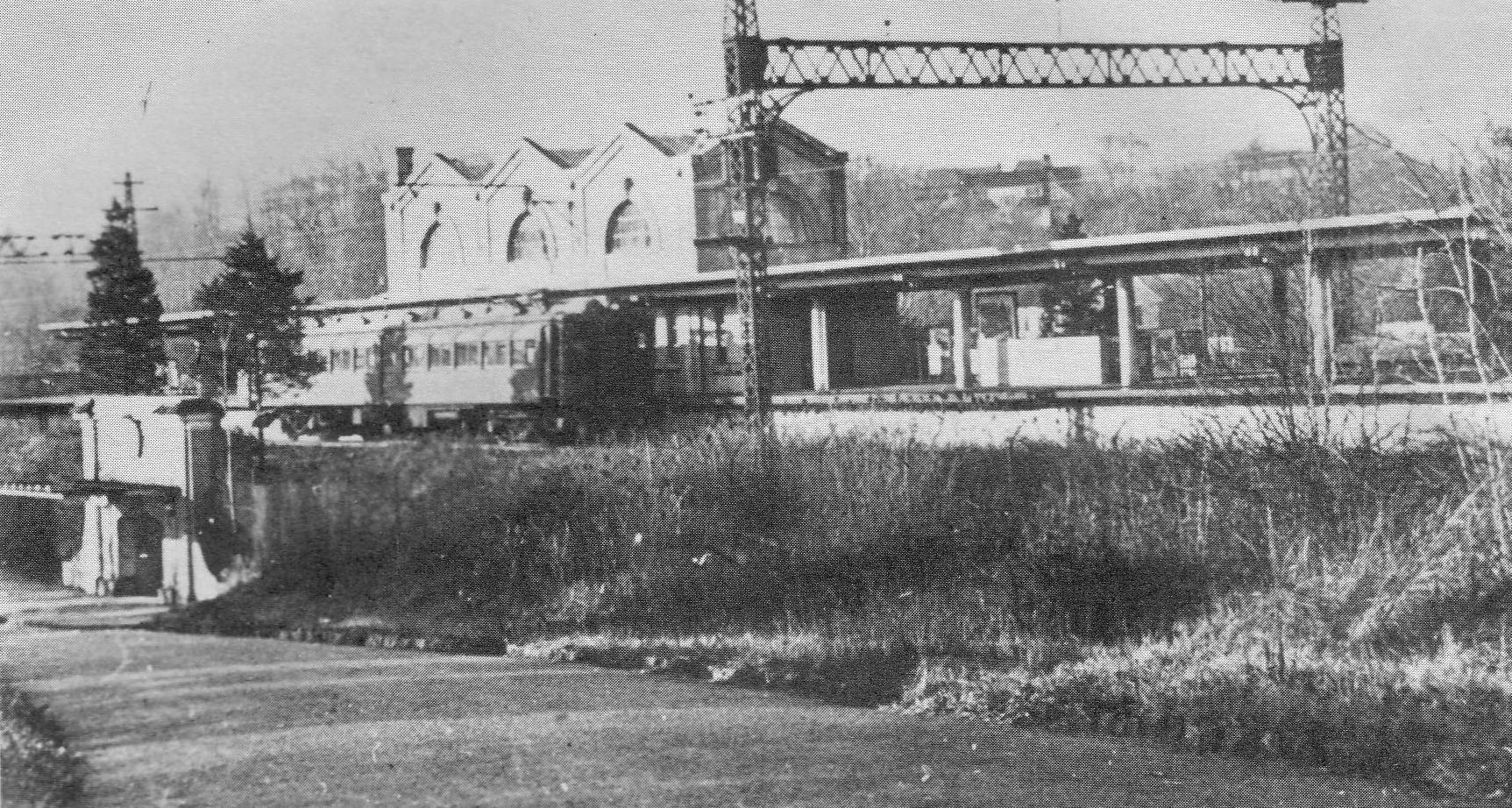
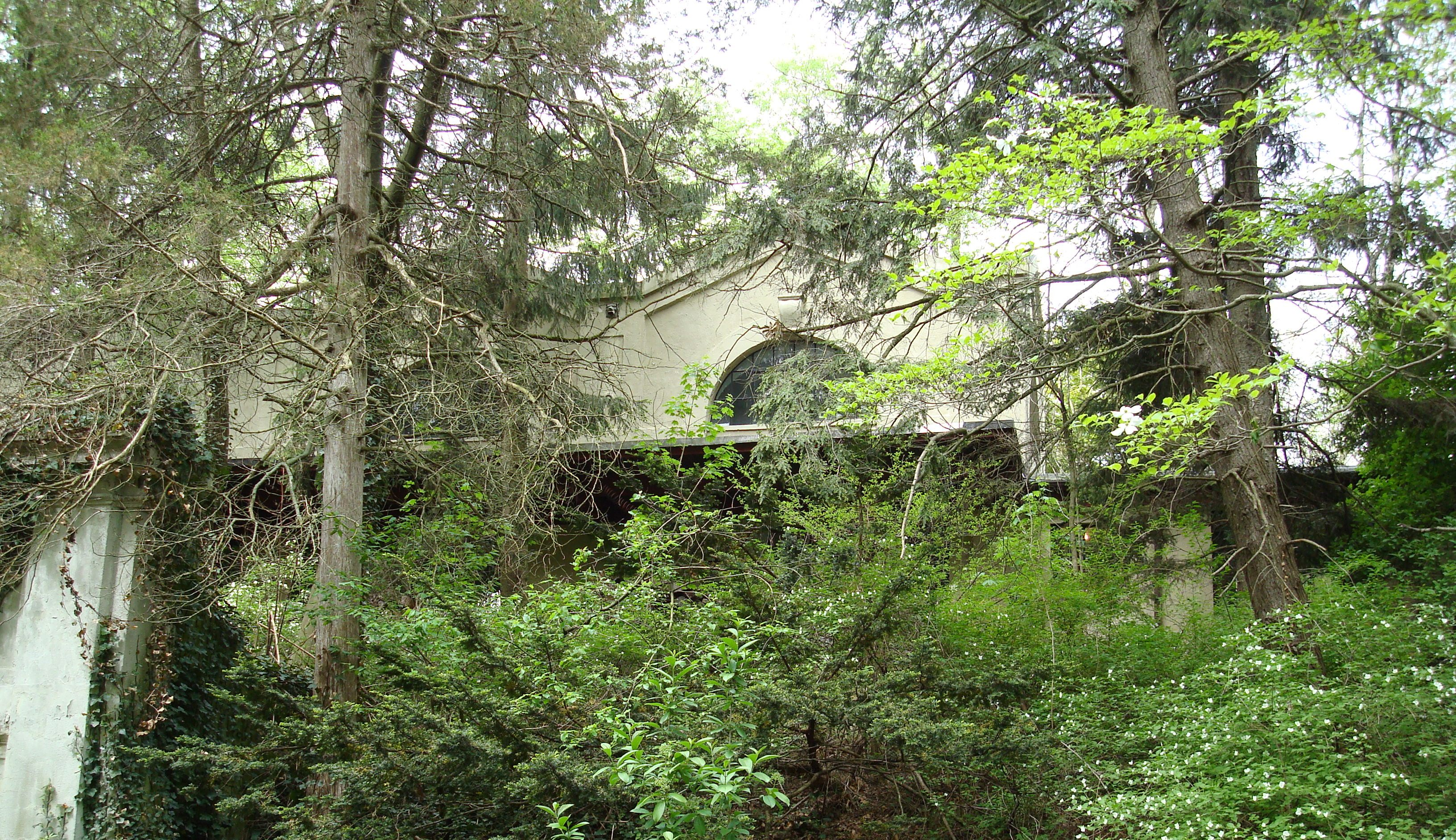
In 1912 (left) and 2007 (right)

Since the NYW&B was constructed all at once, one architectural firm, Fellheimer & Long with Allen H. Stem Associated Architects, designed all the stations, platforms and signals for the line. For reasons of continuity, maintenance and appearance, concrete was used as the material for all stations. Built in Renaissance, mission or classic styles, the NYW&B stations are considered among the most well-designed depots in the country. The design of the Quaker Ridge station’s peaked roof was inspired by Manhattan’s Pennsylvania Station. The main structure and covered platforms are of concrete and steel, with tile covering the roof area. The station proper is 52 feet in length, while the platforms represent a covered area of 340 feet, 170 feet on each side.

From an architectural standpoint, the layout of the station was very well-designed. One unusual feature was the below-grade entrance leading to the station house located on an island platform between the northbound and southbound tracks. Commuters on the line were able to enter and leave the building with no problems and the station house protected them from the elements when necessary. The proximity to New York was a strong point of the station and the area, with commuters able to reach the southernmost point of Manhattan within fifty-three minutes or less.

The station was built in 1912 and remained in operation until 1938 when financial distress caused the New York, Westchester & Boston Railway to shut down. The property lay dormant for many years until it was purchased by a local artist in the mid-1950s for conversion to a private residence. The building still retains most of the original details including the two original passenger platforms. The original driveway and turn around for the station has been converted to a dead-end street.
