= Rye station (Metro-North) =

Metro-North Railroad station in New York

Rye
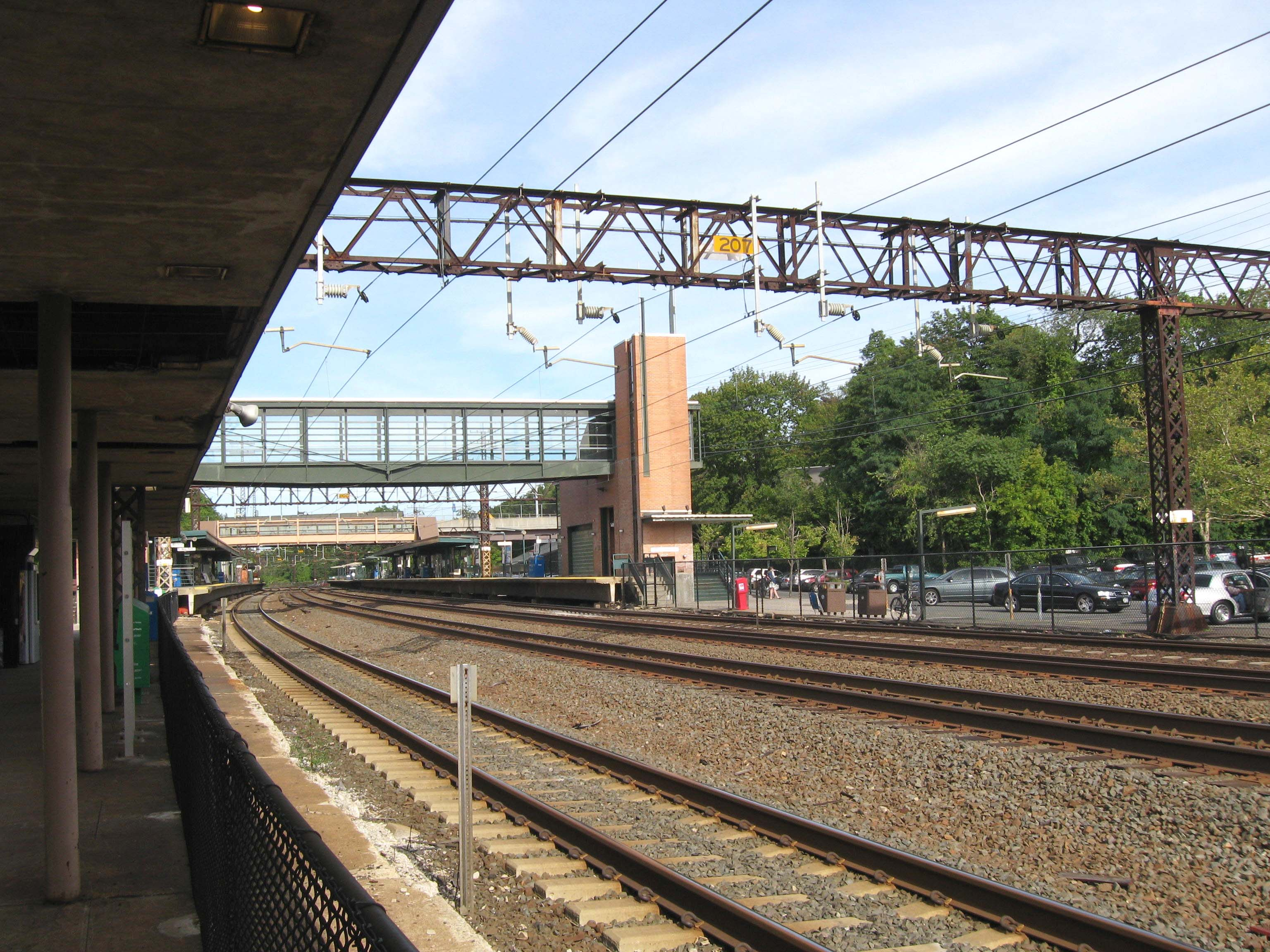
- Rye station from the southbound platform

General information
- Location: 2 Station Plaza; Rye, New York
- Coordinates: 40.987803°N 73.679123°W
- Owner: Metropolitan Transportation Authority
- Line: MTA New Haven Line (Northeast Corridor)
- Platforms: 2 side platforms
- Tracks: 4
- Connections: Bee-Line Bus System: 61, 75

Construction
- Parking: 675 spaces
- Accessible: Yes

Other information
- Fare zone: 14

History
- Opened: December 25, 1848

Passengers
- 2018: 2,443 daily boardings

Services
Preceding station	Metro-North Railroad	Following station
Harrison toward Grand Central	New Haven Line	Port Chester toward Stamford
Former services
Preceding station	Amtrak	Following station
New York toward Washington, D.C.	Montrealer	Stamford toward Montreal
Preceding station	New York, New Haven and Hartford Railroad	Following station
Harrison toward New York	Main Line	Port Chester toward New Haven
Preceding station	New York, Westchester and Boston Railway	Following station
Harrison toward Harlem River via Columbus Avenue	Port Chester Branch	Port Chester Terminus
Location

Rye station is a commuter rail stop on the Metro-North Railroad New Haven Line, located in the city of Rye, New York. The station has two side platforms, each ten cars long, serving the outer tracks of the four-track line.

== History ==
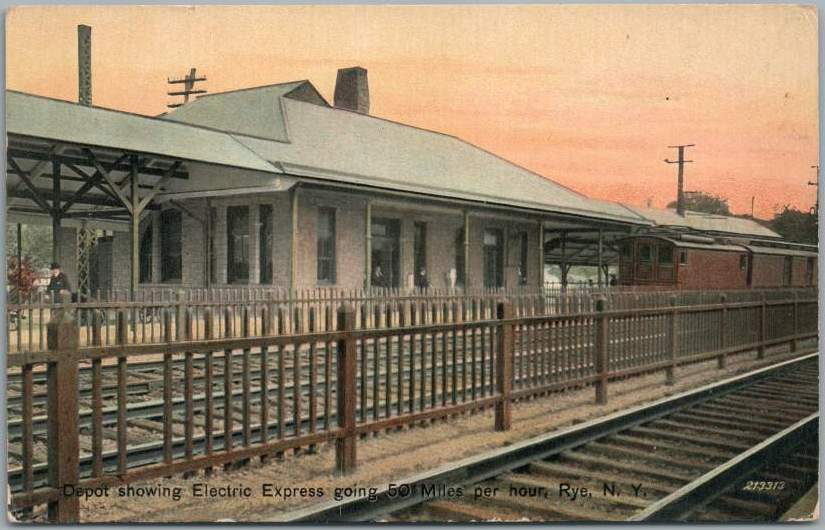
Early 20th century postcard of the station

Railroad service through Rye dates back to the 1840s when the New York and New Haven Railroad laid tracks through the town and the city. The NY&NH was merged into the New York, New Haven and Hartford Railroad in 1872. In 1907 the main line was electrified through a major power plant across the state line in Cos Cob built by Westinghouse. Beginning on July 1, 1928, Rye became the northeastern terminus of the New Haven Railroad's affiliate, the New York, Westchester and Boston Railway, on a separate platform from the rest of the station. By December 7, 1929 the line was extended to Port Chester and Rye served as the penultimate stop on the Port Chester Branch. The NYW&B station closed on October 31, 1937, and the New Haven removed the rails in 1940. The New England Thruway was built on the site of the NYW&B station during the 1950s.

In 1955, architect Marcel Breuer designed new stations at Rye and New London for the New Haven Railroad as part of a design program overseen by Knoll Associates. Neither station was ultimately built.

As with all New Haven Line stations in Westchester County, the station became a Penn Central station upon acquisition by Penn Central Railroad in 1969. The station was updated in 1972 from low-level to high-level platforms. This was done to accommodate the arrival of new rail cars known then as Cosmopolitans, now more commonly known as M2s. The new cars did not include boarding steps, or traps, as their predecessor 4400 Pullman "Washboard" cars did, and could only board passengers at stations with high-level platforms. The update was done in two phases, with the eastern half of the station upgraded first: then the western half.

Due to the railroad's continuous financial despair throughout the 1970s, they were forced to turn over their commuter service to the Metropolitan Transportation Authority. For many years, Rye was the eastern Westchester County station for Amtrak, with trains such as the Connecticut Yankee and Mail Express. MTA transferred the station to Metro-North in 1983, and Amtrak moved to New Rochelle in October 1987.
