= New York, Westchester and Boston Railway =

Former U.S. railway company

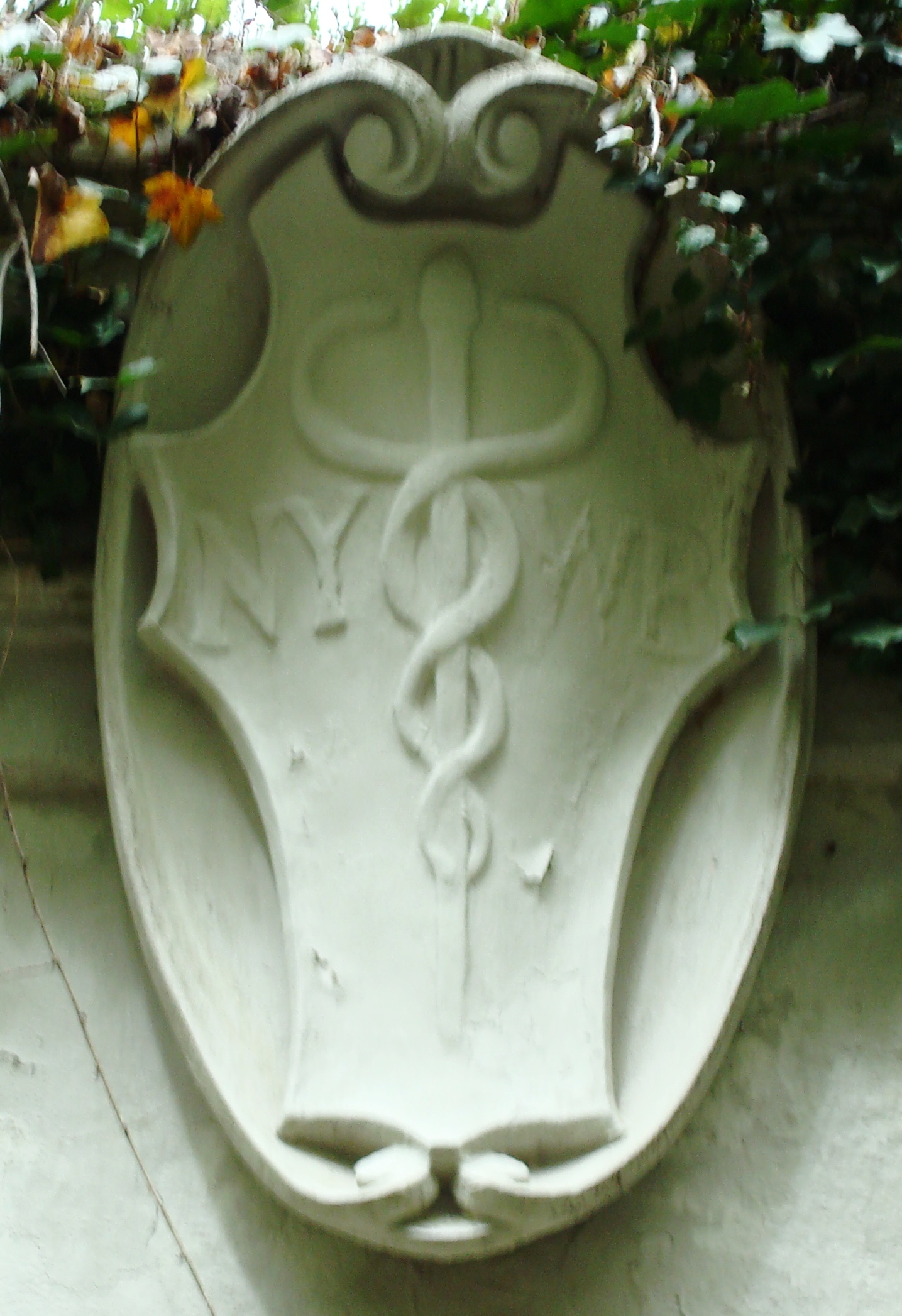

Overview
- Headquarters: Bronx, New York
- Reporting mark: NYWB
- Locale: New York
- Dates of operation: 1912–1937
- Successor: New York City Transit Authority (IRT Dyre Avenue Line)

Technical
- Track gauge: 4 ft 8 1/2 in (1,435 mm) standard gauge

The New York, Westchester and Boston Railway Company (NYW&B, also known to its riders as "the Westchester" and colloquially as the "Boston-Westchester"), was an electric commuter railroad in the Bronx and Westchester County, New York from 1912 to 1937. It ran from the southernmost part of the South Bronx, near the Harlem River, to Mount Vernon with branches north to White Plains and east to Port Chester. From 1906, construction and operation was under the control of the New York, New Haven & Hartford Railroad (NH) until its bankruptcy in 1935.

A 4-mile (6.4 km) section survives as the IRT Dyre Avenue Line (5 train) of the New York City Subway.

== History ==
=== Precursors and origins ===
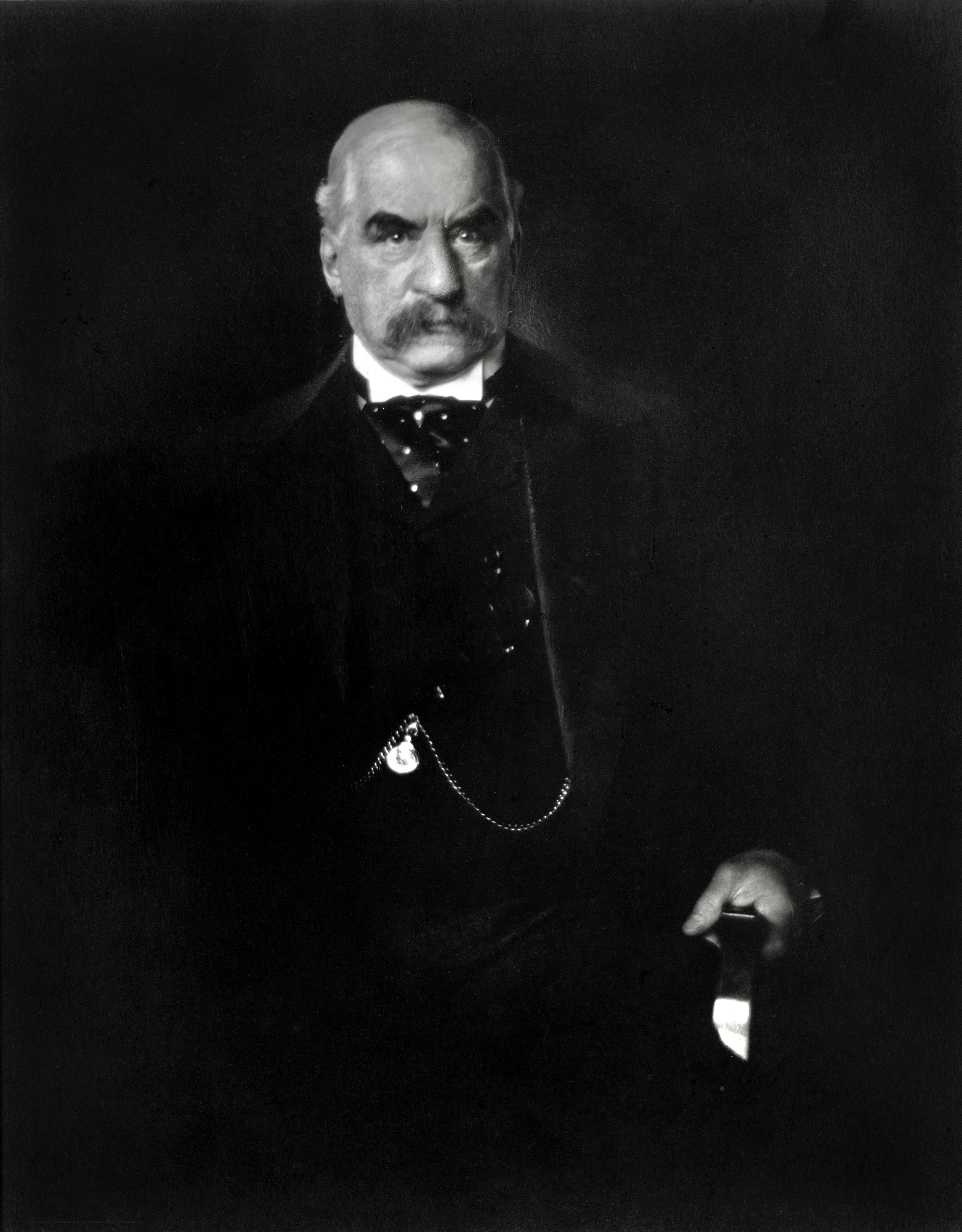
J.P. Morgan

In 1871 the Southern Westchester Railroad was incorporated to run from what was then the southern edge of Westchester County (now the Bronx) at the Harlem River to the Westchester County seat, White Plains, along the same general route as was taken by the NYW&B. By 1875, this enterprise went into foreclosure and was liquidated in 1881. In 1872, the New York, Westchester and Boston Railway Company (NYW&B) was incorporated to serve areas north of New York City, with lines running from the Harlem River to Throgs Neck in the Bronx, and Port Chester and White Plains in Westchester County. The Panic of 1873 denied this venture the financing for construction. It entered receivership on March 20, 1875, not emerging until 1904.

Starting in 1874 portions of Westchester County were made part of New York City, a process that was complete by 1898, with the Bronx in its current configuration. This put much of the NYW&B franchise under the control of the City of New York — meaning the New York Democratic organization, Tammany Hall. In 1901, while the NYW&B still in receivership, the Harlem River & Port Chester Railroad (HR&PC) was incorporated to build a route from the Harlem River to Port Chester, parallel to the NYW&B route and the New York, New Haven & Hartford Railroad (NH) main line. Meanwhile, the NYW&B emerged from receivership on January 14, 1904, and began acquiring additional real estate rights for its route. In 1906 bankers Oakleigh Thorne and Marsden J. Perry bought the stock of the NYW&B on behalf of the Millbrook Company, a holding entity. After the Panic of 1907, the assets of the Millbrook Company were transferred over to the NH for $11 million, becoming a part of that company's emerging consolidated monopoly on rail and water transportation in southern New England. A lawsuit between the Harlem River and Port Chester Railroad (HR&PC) and the NYW&B was settled with the HR&PC franchise being acquired by the NYW&B in early 1909 and the HR&PC being consolidated into the NYW&B the following year. On January 18, 1910, the reorganized entity was consolidated under the control of the NH, but inheriting the business arrangements made while under direct control of financier J.P. Morgan.

=== Construction ===
Construction of the railroad began in 1909. The NYW&B was built to an exceptional standard from 180th Street to White Plains and through Pelham. Construction (excluding the cost of the NYW&B stock) and rolling stock cost more than $1.2 million per mile, an extraordinary amount in 1910. Rails were 90 lb/yd (45 kg/m). Grades were modest, exceeding 1% only to link to the NH line south of 180th Street. Curves were gentle, exceeding 6 degrees for express tracks only at one location in Mount Vernon, which had an 8-degree curve.

The stations, attractive cast concrete with marble interiors, used high platforms for faster passenger loading and unloading. No public roads were crossed at grade, a feat that required the construction of many costly bridges, tunnels, and viaducts. From 180th Street to Columbus Avenue, the line was four tracks, then double track to White Plains and Port Chester. Two stations on the White Plains line had four tracks, although express-train operation using the four-track stations did not prove to be warranted by the traffic volume.

The extension from New Rochelle to Port Chester was built to a much more economical standard, as exemplified by wooden platforms and more modest stations. The line was completed as far as Larchmont in 1921, Mamaroneck in 1926, Harrison in 1927, Rye in 1928, and Port Chester in December 1929. An additional station was constructed in White Plains at Ridgeway in 1929 to serve the growing residential area in that neighborhood. Mimicking the Port Chester station, the wooden construction consisted of two side platforms.

=== Operation ===
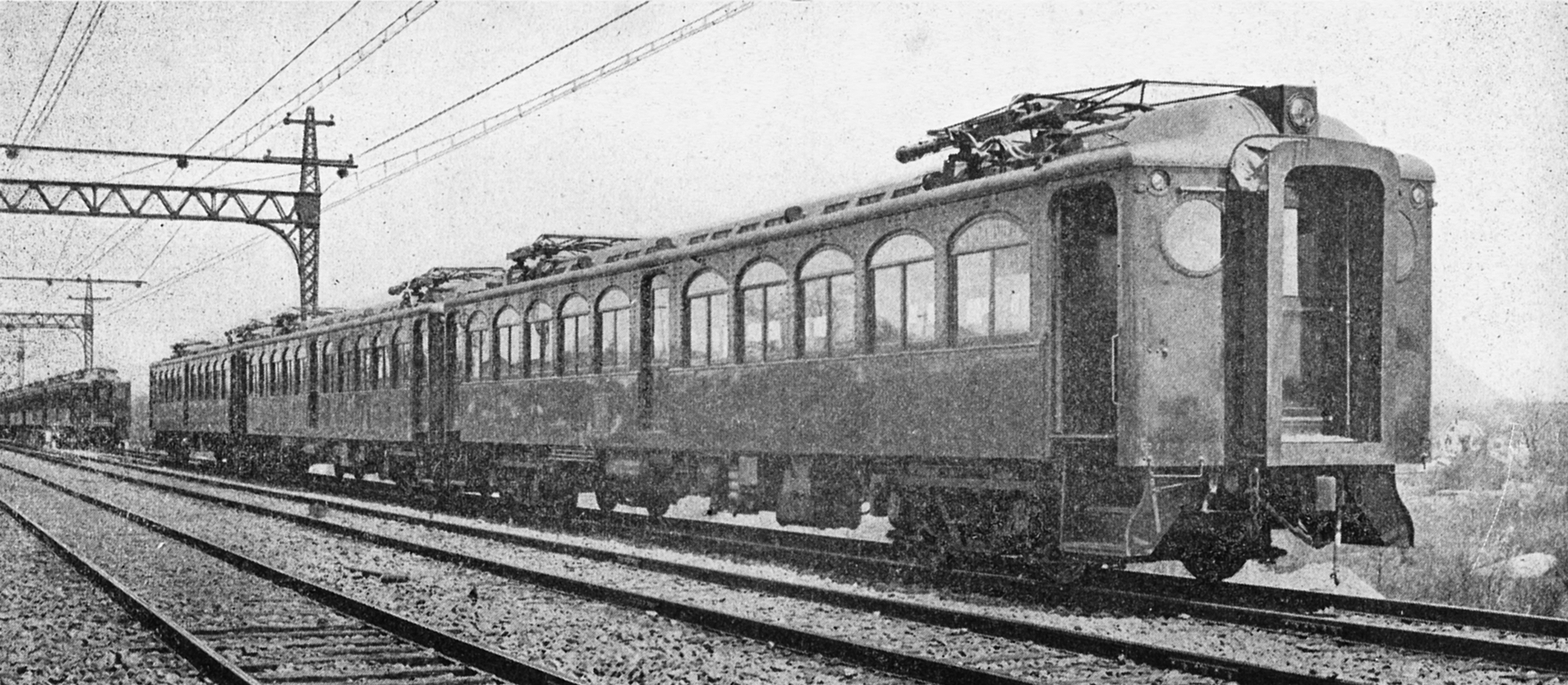
NYWB's rapid transit cars

Passenger service began on May 29, 1912, between Adams Street in the Bronx (the modern East 180th Street station) and North Avenue in New Rochelle. It was thought that commuters would trade a direct ride to Grand Central Terminal for a lower fare but more comfortable ride into the Bronx, where they would pay 5 cents to transfer to the elevated IRT Third Avenue Line into Manhattan. On July 1, 1912, a branch was opened to Westchester Avenue in White Plains, splitting off the main line at Columbus Avenue. On August 3, through service commenced on the New York, New Haven and Hartford Railroad's Harlem River Branch to the Third Avenue Line.

"Given a choice between Grand Central and a higher fare or the Bronx terminal and a lower fare, passengers by the thousands were expected to switch to the Westchester," Stan Fischler wrote in his 1976 book Uptown, Downtown: A Trip Through Time on New York's Subways. However, the NYW&B's all-electric coaches and "carpet-smooth track beds" failed to convince a sufficient number of commuters to ride the NYW&B and then transfer to the Third Avenue El.

Franchises required the NYW&B to operate trains at a minimum frequency of two per hour, and it ran up to three times that frequency during rush hours. Trains were from one to six cars in length. Traffic grew from 2.9 million passengers per year in 1913 to 14.1 million in 1928. The completion of the Port Chester branch in 1929 allowed the New Haven to terminate passenger service on its Harlem River branch in 1930. Freight traffic on the line was very limited. The savings of not paying the high costs of using Grand Central were offset by the lower fares that the NYW&B charged. In no year of its operation was it able to cover the interest on its bonds, which had been guaranteed by the NH.

=== Competition ===
With the death of J. P. Morgan in 1913 competition between the NH and NYC became less restrained. The NYW&B's White Plains line ran about two miles (3 km) east of the Harlem Division of the NYC. The Harlem Division served the settled towns and villages along the Bronx River and its commuter trains enjoyed the advantage of running directly into Manhattan. The Port Chester line was adjacent to NH rails for more than half of its length and was only two miles west of NH's Harlem River Branch for the balance. Although NH's Harlem Branch trains also terminated at the Harlem River terminal, regular NH commuter trains ran into Grand Central. When NH's bankruptcy led to the separation of ownership of the NYW&B from the New Haven, the NH's trustee was able to terminate the NYW&B's lease of its right of way from New Rochelle to Portchester.

The rise of the automobile denied railroads the revenue benefits from the growth of the suburbs to whose growth they had contributed. Even the rapid transit connections available at Harlem River and East 180th Street were inconvenient compared to the direct service offered by the NYC and the NH to Grand Central. The great postwar construction boom and explosion of the suburbs came too late to benefit the NYW&B.

=== Liquidation ===
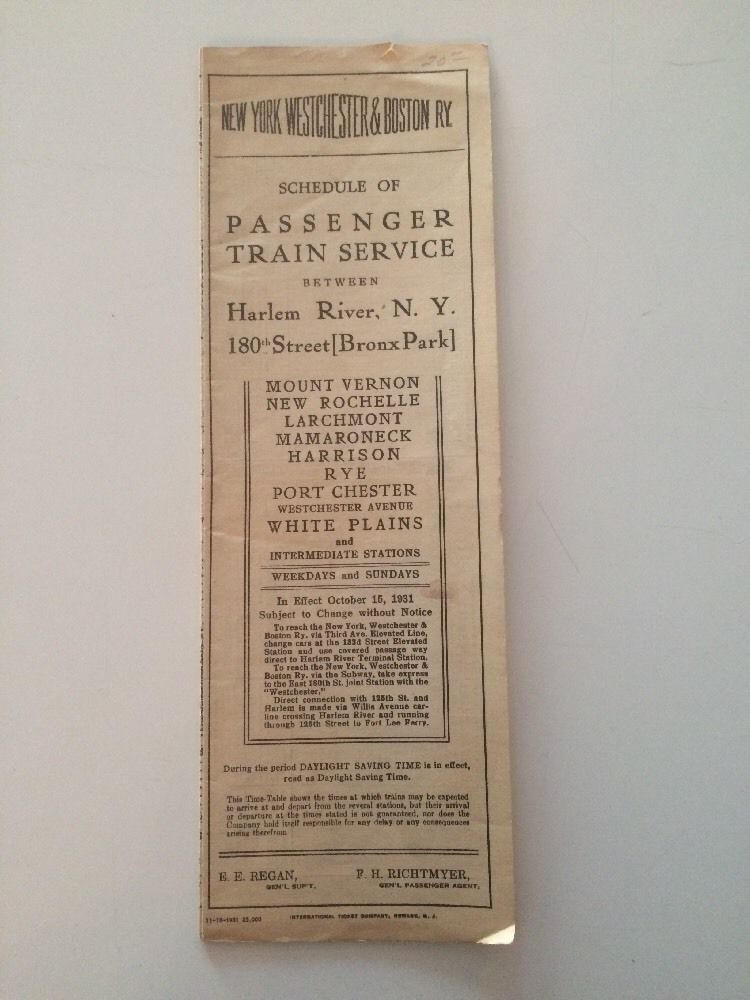
1931 timetable

The NH had been making up any shortfall in the ability of the NYW&B to meet its debt obligations. Thus, when the NH entered bankruptcy in 1935, the NYW&B did as well. Former New Haven General Manager Clinton L. Bardo was appointed as Trustee to try to turn around the fortunes of the ailing Westchester. But the trustees of the NH bankruptcy and the trustees of the NYW&B bankruptcy were responsible to different groups of creditors. The liquidation brought them into conflict. The NYW&B was forced to cease operating on the Port Chester line to enhance the revenues of the NH from its parallel service. The loss of revenue could not be offset by lower costs. If the NYW&B had been left intact, it would have required the New Haven to pay off a bond issue that was due in 1946. Total liquidation was the only answer. Bardo died of a heart attack in August 1937, before the full effect of his policies could be realized. The NYW&B ceased operations on December 31, 1937.

There were legislative and legal efforts to restore service on the route in the ensuing years. A bill to create the new Bronx-Westchester Railroad Authority to purchase and operate the Westchester for public benefit made it all the way to New York State Governor Herbert H. Lehman's office before he was pressured by New York City Mayor Fiorello La Guardia to veto the bill. The only successful effort was the purchase by the City of New York of the track, stations, and right-of-way between 180th Street and Dyre Avenue. After the installation of a third-rail it began operations as a shuttle service. With the construction of connecting trackage at 180th Street, it commenced operations as the current IRT Dyre Avenue Line.

The rails, steel bridges, and electrical distribution system were dismantled to provide steel and copper for the war effort in 1942. The sale of other assets, principally real estate, was complete by 1946, bringing the final end to the corporate entity.

During World War II, the original Stillwell MU cars were acquired for the war effort and shipped to Texas. Their pantographs were removed and the cars were hauled by a steam locomotive to bring workers from the city of Houston to the shipyards in Pasadena to build Liberty ships. The train was locally called the "shuttle train" and operated until the end of the war.

== Equipment and power ==
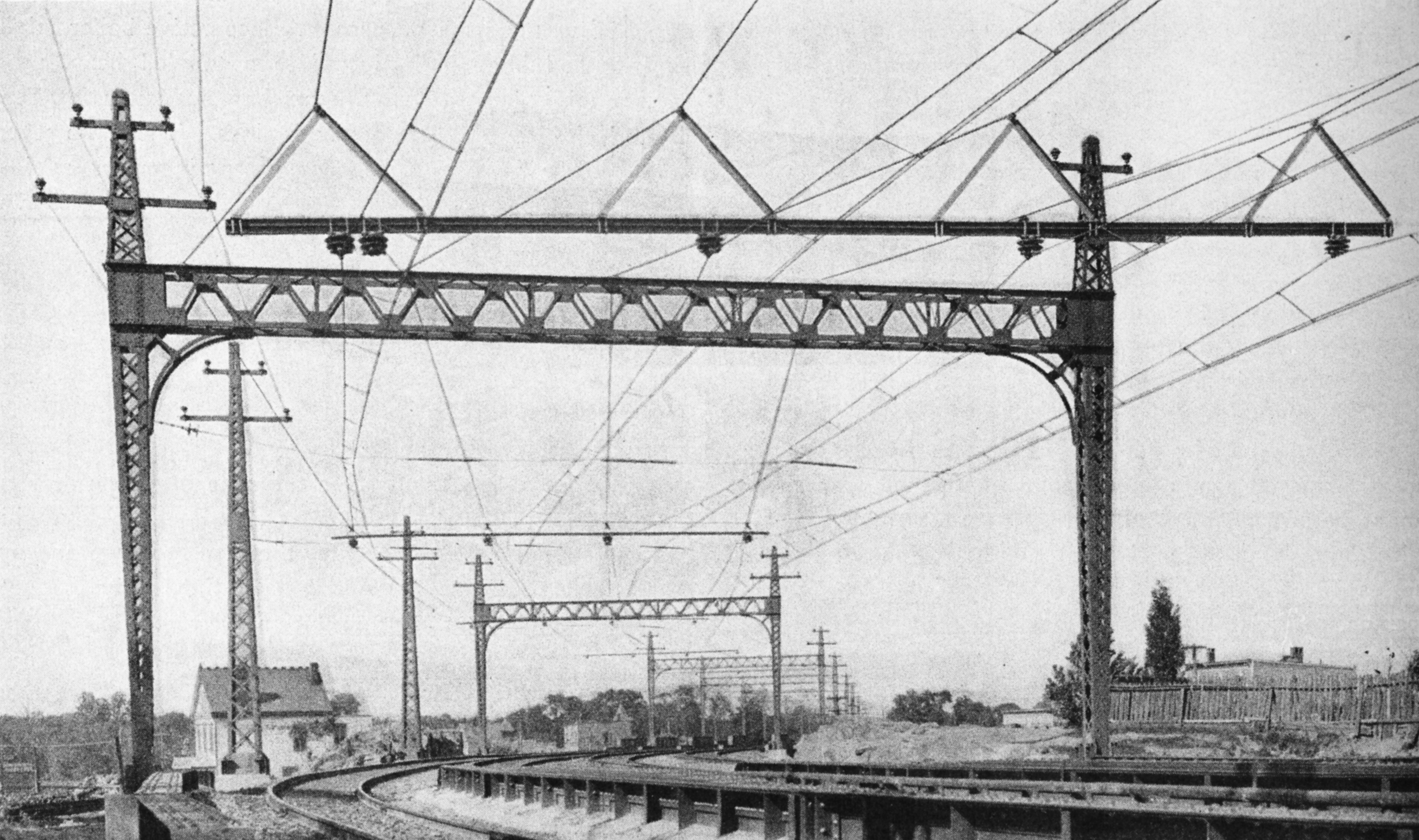
Electric power lines

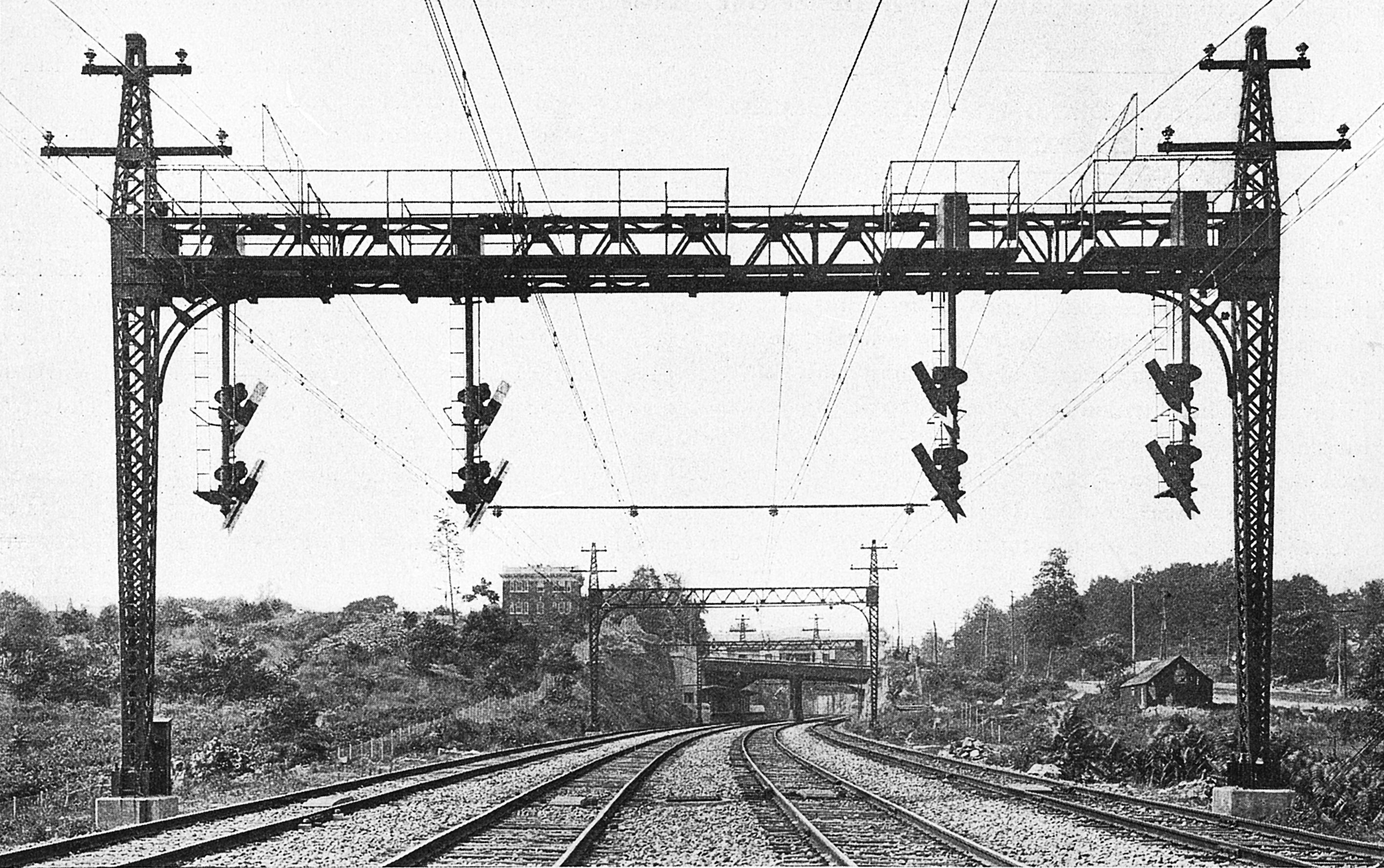
Overhead signal gantry

The NYW&B powered its equipment by overhead lines carrying 11,000 volts alternating current at 25 Hz, the same as the New Haven. The New Haven's Cos Cob plant generated the power, which the NYW&B received at New Rochelle.

The principal rolling stock for the NYW&B was 95 motorized coaches, designed by L. B. Stillwell and built by the Pressed Steel Car Company, with center doors for high-platform use only and end doors that could accommodate low platforms. They were governed to a maximum speed of 57 miles per hour and a maximum acceleration of one mile per hour per second. The 11,000 volt overhead power was stepped down to 250 volts for the operation of the motors. NYW&B had a single 655 hp (488 kW) locomotive for freight and utility use.

== Stations and route ==
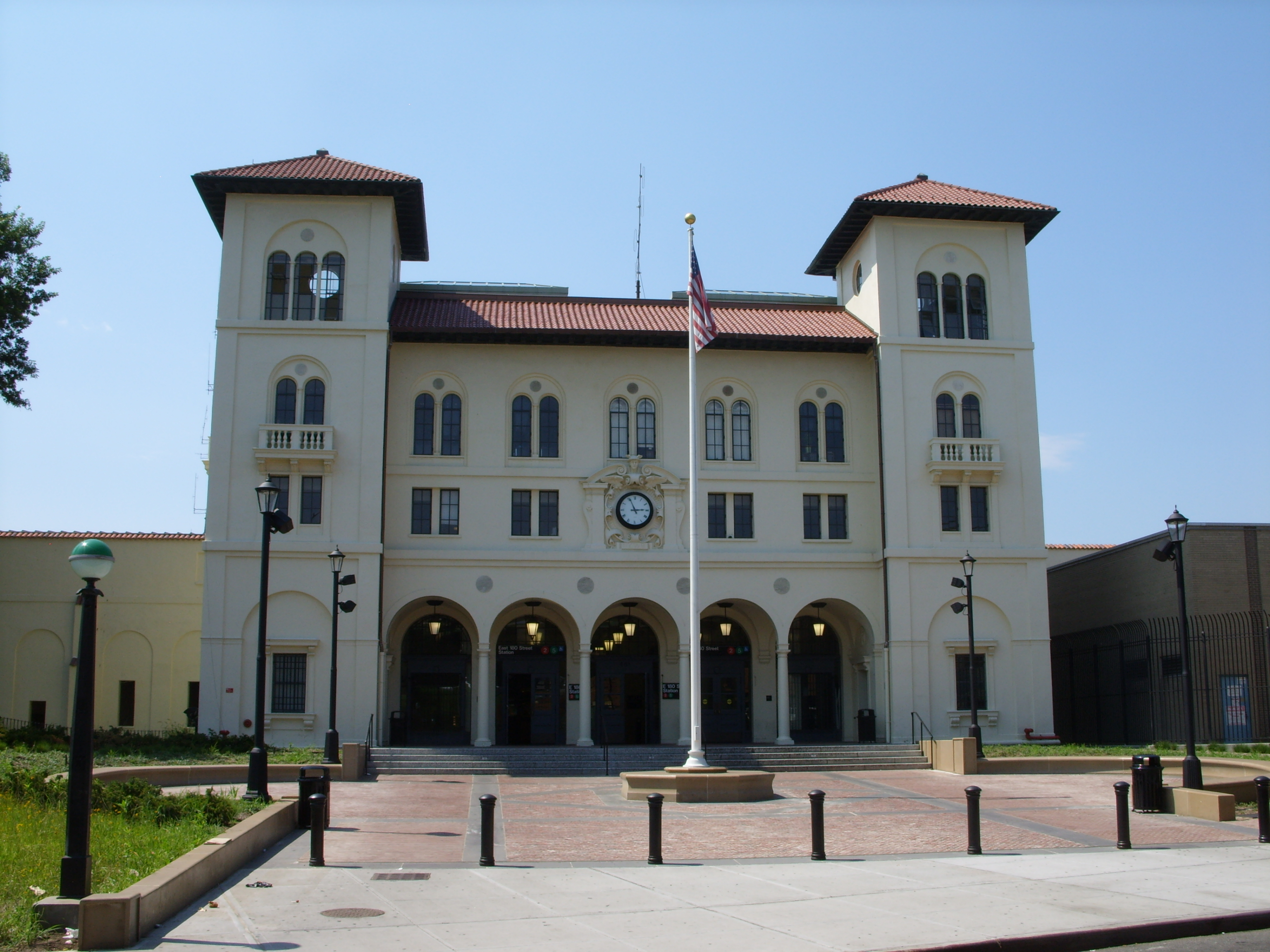
Headquarters and main station, 180th Street

The NYW&B route began at Harlem River station at 132nd Street and Willis Avenue. An elevated shuttle and later a covered walkway linked it to the 129th Street station of the Second and Third Avenue elevated lines (and later to the IRT subway). NYW&B's tracks ran parallel to the NH's tracks, serving four stations also served by New Haven commuter service, to just south of 180th Street, which was the site of the company's headquarters, shops, and yard, and a major transfer point to the New York City Subway. From 180th Street the railroad ran on its own four-track right of way, serving six stations in the Bronx and three in Mount Vernon before its routes divided at Columbus Avenue.

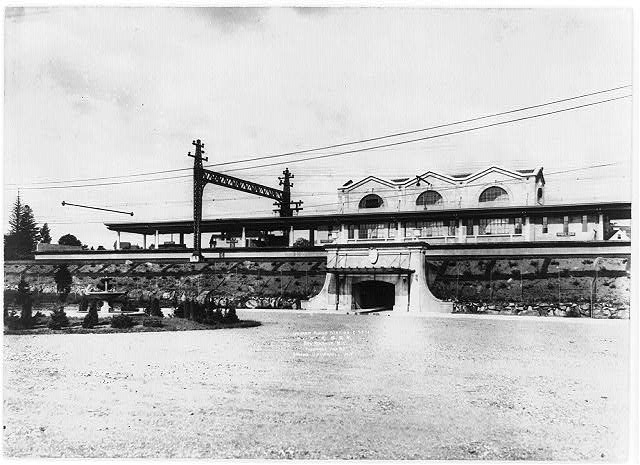
Quaker Ridge Station in New Rochelle

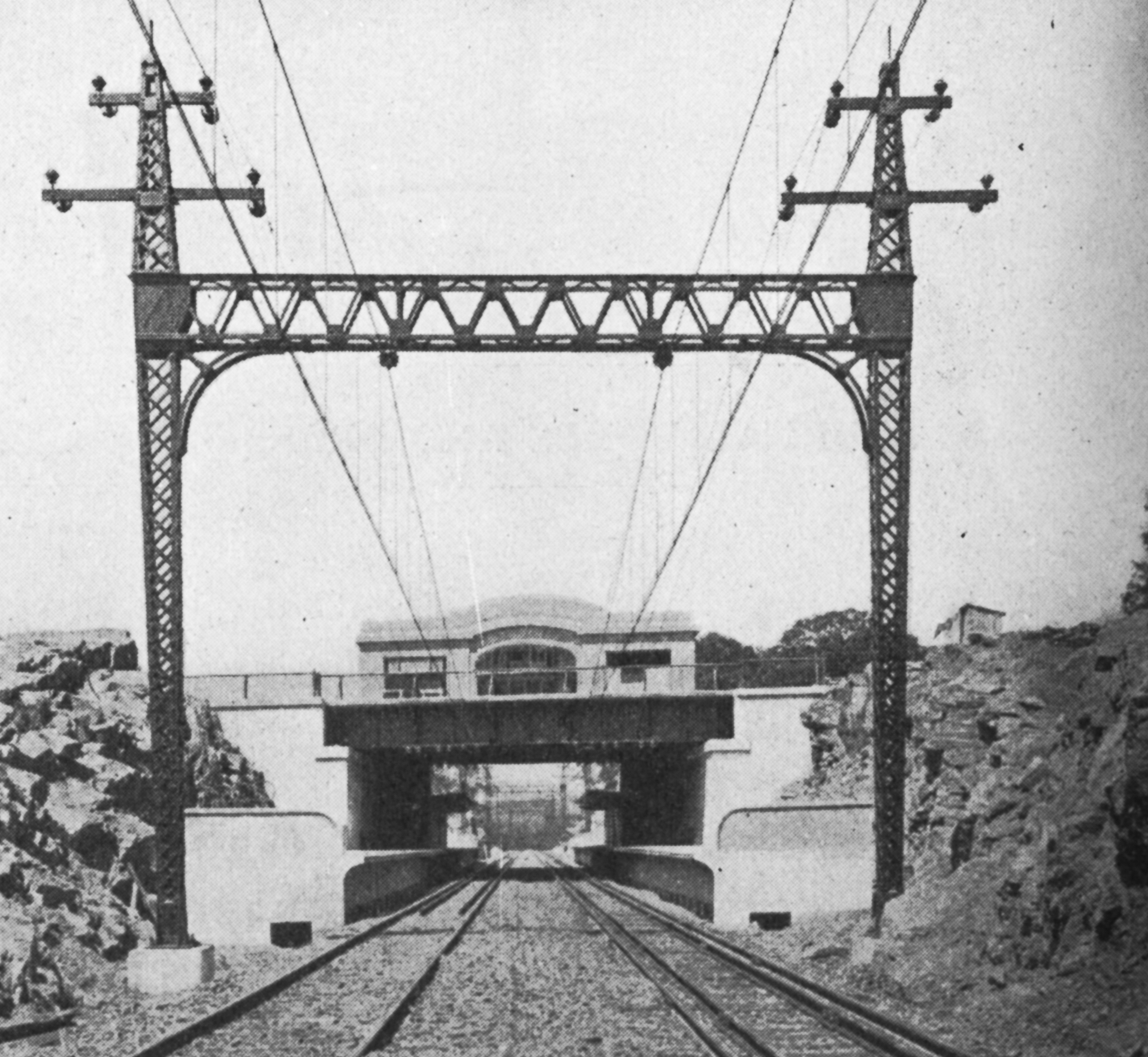
Typical NYWB station in a cut

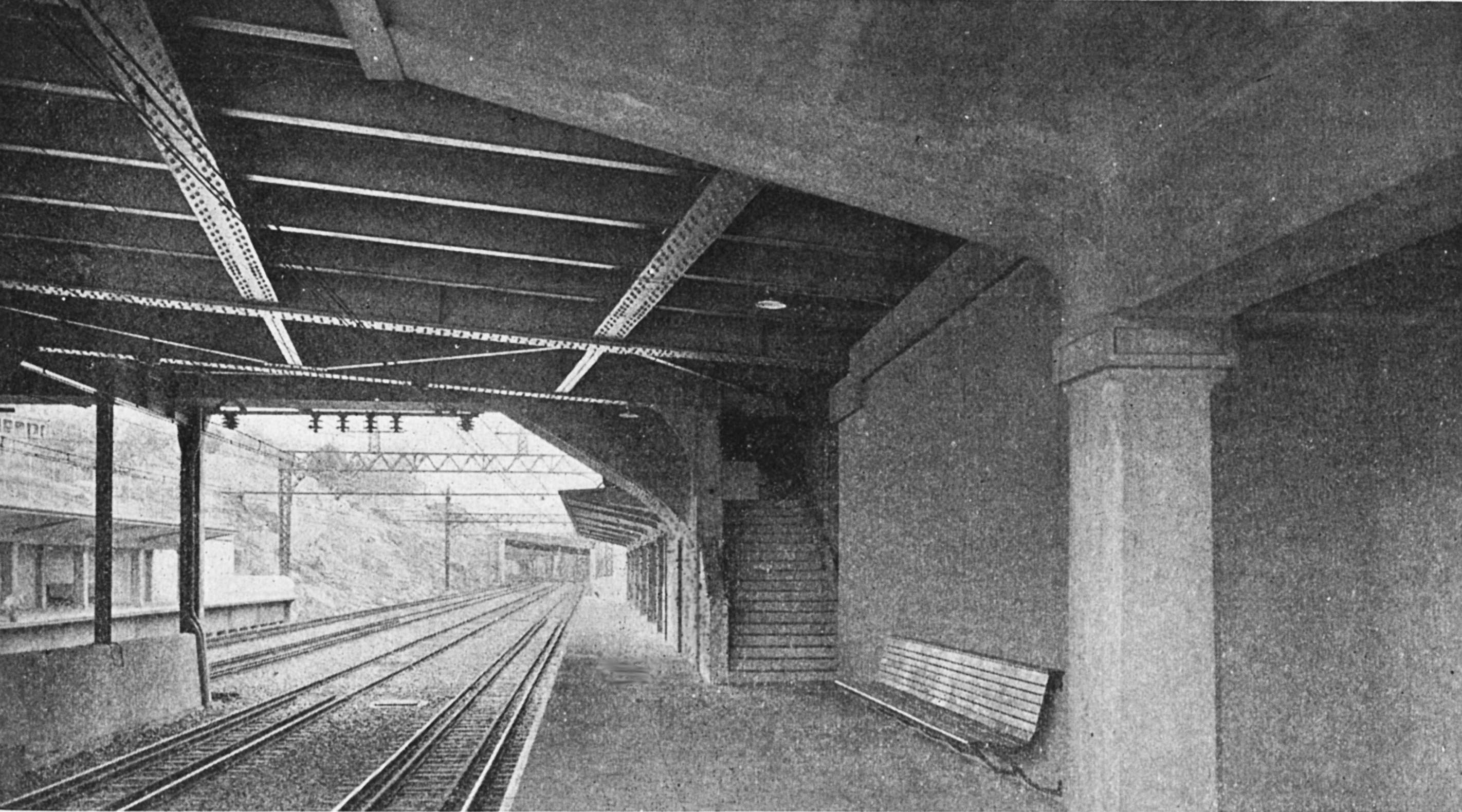
Platforms with local and express tracks at Sixth Street station in Mount Vernon

From there, one line ran north, with one more station in Mount Vernon and stations at Chester Heights in eastern Eastchester, Wykagyl and Quaker Ridge in northern New Rochelle, Heathcote at the border of northern New Rochelle and eastern Scarsdale, Ridgeway, Gedney Way and Mamaroneck Avenue stations in White Plains, and the White Plains terminal on the eastern edge of downtown at Westchester Avenue and Bloomingdale Road.

The other line went east with the Fifth Avenue station in North Pelham, the Pelhamwood station on New Rochelle/ Pelham border, and the Remington, North Avenue and Pine Brook stations in central New Rochelle. The route ran on its own tracks on the NH line from New Rochelle, just east of the NH's New Rochelle station. The line served the same stations as the NH between New Rochelle and Port Chester and the Larchmont Gardens station in Larchmont and the West Street station in Harrison.

=== Station listing ===
Milepost	City	Station	Tracks	Platform	Date opened	Date closed	Connections and notes
0.0	Bronx	Harlem River	5	5 High	August 3, 1912	December 31, 1937	NYNH&H Harlem River Branch (through 1930); New York City IRT Third Avenue elevated
0.91	Bronx	Port Morris	2	2 Low	August 3, 1912	December 31, 1937	NYNH&H Harlem Branch (through 1930)
1.90	Bronx	Casanova	2	2 Low	August 3, 1912	December 31, 1937	NYNH&H Harlem Branch (through 1930)
2.57	Bronx	Hunt's Point	2	2 Low	August 3, 1912	December 31, 1937	NYNH&H Harlem Branch (through 1930)
3.19	Bronx	Westchester Avenue	2	2 Low	August 3, 1912	December 31, 1937	NYNH&H Harlem Branch (through 1930)
4.37	Bronx	East 180th Street	4	4 High	May 29, 1912	December 31, 1937	New York City Subway IRT White Plains Road Line; 40.841001°N 73.874001°W
5.50	Bronx	Morris Park	4	2 High	May 29, 1912	December 31, 1937	40.854429°N 73.860397°W
5.90	Bronx	Pelham Parkway	4	4 High	May 29, 1912	December 31, 1937	40.85813°N 73.856063°W
6.74	Bronx	Gun Hill Road	4	2 High	May 29, 1912	December 31, 1937	40.87017°N 73.845806°W
7.56	Bronx	Baychester Avenue	4	2 High	May 29, 1912	December 31, 1937	40.87864°N 73.838639°W
8.33	Bronx	Dyre Avenue	4	2 High	May 29, 1912	December 31, 1937	40.889055°N 73.830614°W
8.63	Mount Vernon	Kingsbridge Road	4	2 High	May 29, 1912	December 31, 1937	40°53′31″N 73°49′43″W
9.24	Mount Vernon	East Sixth Street	4	2 High	May 29, 1912	December 31, 1937	
9.79	Mount Vernon	East Third Street	4	4 High	May 29, 1912	December 31, 1937	40°54′30″N 73°49′38″W
10.27	Mount Vernon	Columbus Avenue	4	2 High	May 29, 1912	December 31, 1937	NYNH&H at Columbus Avenue; 40°54′44″N 73°49′21″W
Services to Westchester Avenue and Port Chester split
Service to Westchester Avenue
10.66	Mount Vernon	East Lincoln Avenue	2	2 High	July 1, 1912	December 31, 1937	East Lincoln Avenue between Station Place and Hutchison Boulevard
11.63	Eastchester	Chester Heights	2	2 High	July 1, 1912	December 31, 1937	40°55′43.5″N 73°48′30.8″W
13.01	New Rochelle	Wykagyl	4	4 High	July 1, 1912	December 31, 1937	40°56′44.29″N 73°47′43.33″W?
15.09	New Rochelle	Quaker Ridge	2	2 High	July 1, 1912	December 31, 1937	40°58′18″N 73°46′36″W?
15.95	New Rochelle/Scarsdale	Heathcote	4	4 High	July 1, 1912	December 31, 1937	40°59′4.3″N 73°46′31.6″W
17.51	White Plains	Ridgeway	2	2 High	1929	December 31, 1937	41°0′12″N 73°45′31″W
18.26	White Plains	Gedney Way	2	2 High	1913–1914	December 31, 1937	41°0′49″N 73°45′29″W
18.89	White Plains	Mamaroneck Avenue	2	2 High	July 1, 1912	December 31, 1937	41°1′24.1″N 73°45′43″W
19.50	White Plains	Westchester Avenue	4	4 High	July 1, 1912	December 31, 1937	Connecting local trolley service 41°1′51.6″N 73°45′28.8″W
Service to Port Chester
10.95	Pelham	Fifth Avenue	2	2 High	May 29, 1912	December 31, 1937	Fifth Avenue and Third Street
11.27	Pelham / New Rochelle	Pelhamwood	2	2 High	May 29, 1912	December 31, 1937	Was named "Clifford" until 1916
11.67	New Rochelle	Remington Place (Webster Avenue)	2	2 High	May 29, 1912	December 31, 1937	40°54′52.7″N 73°47′40.3″W
12.17	New Rochelle	North Avenue	2	2 High	March 20, 1921	December 31, 1937	?
13.02	New Rochelle	Pine Brook	2	2 High	March 20, 1921	October 31, 1937	?
14.03	Larchmont	Larchmont (Chatsworth Avenue)	2	2 High	March 20, 1921	October 31, 1937	NYNH&H at Larchmont
14.78	Mamaroneck	Larchmont Gardens	2	2 High	1926	October 31, 1937	40°56′32″N 73°44′59″W
15.83	Mamaroneck	Mamaroneck	2	2 High	March 21, 1926	October 31, 1937	NYNH&H at Mamaroneck
16.82	Harrison	West Street	2	2 High	1927	October 31, 1937	40°57′53.99″N 73°43′27.23″W
17.60	Harrison	Harrison	2	2 High	July 3, 1927	October 31, 1937	NYNH&H at Harrison
19.44	Rye	Rye	2	2 High	July 1, 1928	October 31, 1937	NYNH&H at Rye
20.90	Port Chester	Port Chester	2	2 High	December 7, 1929	October 31, 1937	NYNH&H at Port Chester

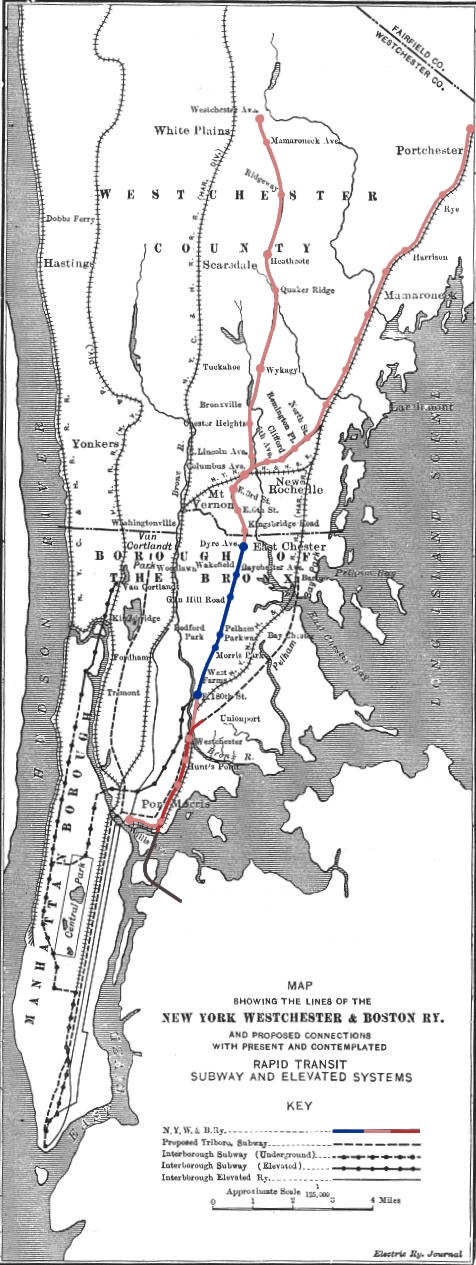
Route map

=== Proposed extensions ===
In the initial 1906 plans for the railroad, a branch to Elmsford was planned, diverging from the White Plains branch near the latter's northern end in the vicinity of Mamaroneck Avenue station, striking out in a northwesterly direction through the city of White Plains, crossing over the Harlem Division of the New York Central (NYC) near the latter's White Plains station, and generally paralleling Tarrytown Road to the Elmsford border. However, after the new village of Elmsford (incorporated in 1910 from the Town of Greenburgh) voted against the NYW&B's presence on esthetic grounds, it was dropped from further consideration.

Another NH interests company, the Westchester Northern Railroad (WN), was chartered in 1910 to build a northward extension of the NYW&B from White Plains to Pound Ridge, with one branch to Danbury, Connecticut and one to Brewster, New York. The NYW&B White Plains terminal was built with this extension in mind. The WN was consolidated with the NYW&B on June 8, 1915. Most activity was limited to acquiring real estate for the right of way, on which no significant construction seems to have taken place. The WN project was officially cancelled by 1925 and the property gradually sold off.

The Harlem Board of Commerce proposed a new connection be built to extend the NYW&B from its Harlem River terminal underground through a new tunnel under the Harlem River and 125th Street, connecting to the Eighth Avenue Line of the Independent Subway System (IND) then under construction. Nothing ever came of this proposal.

The NYW&B crossed the New Haven at a joint station at Columbus Avenue in Mount Vernon. A ramp to the New Haven would have permitted NYW&B trains to run directly to Grand Central: provisions for such a ramp were designed into the overpass, but no track connection was constructed. The NH would have discouraged running trains into Grand Central, since it paid a rental fee to the NYC for each movement into the terminal.

== Remnants ==
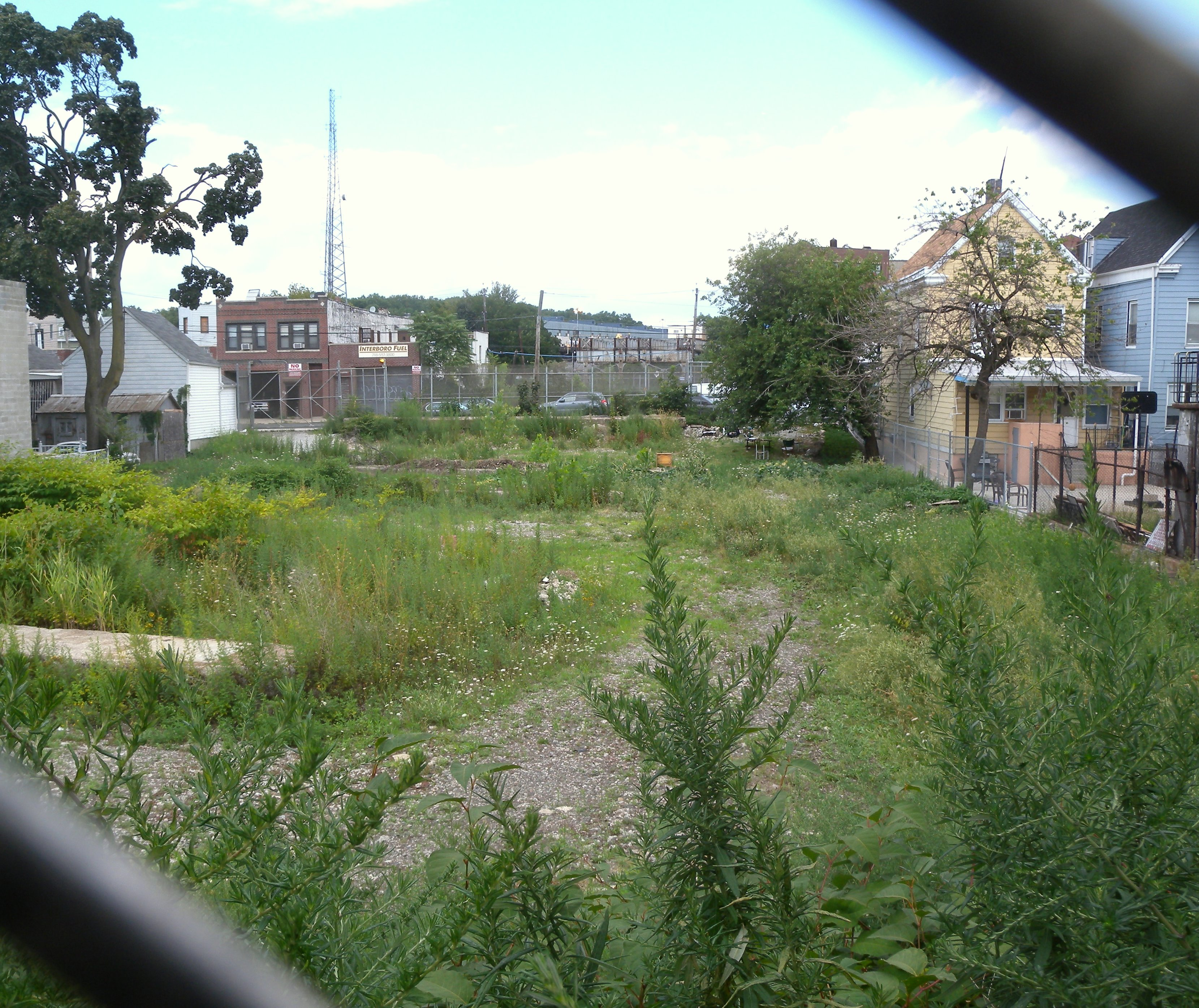
Wyatt Street, Bronx

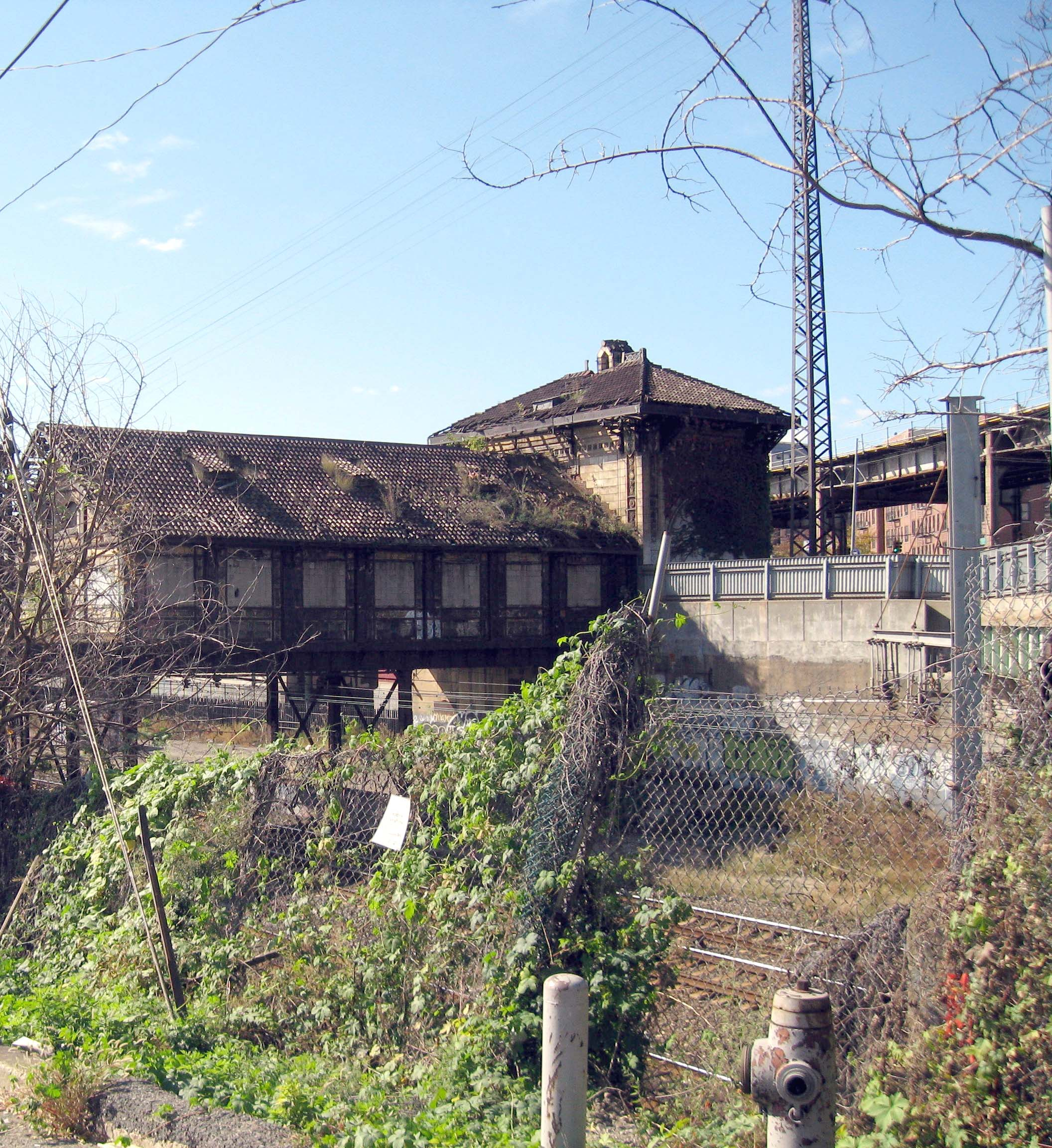
Abandoned Westchester Avenue station

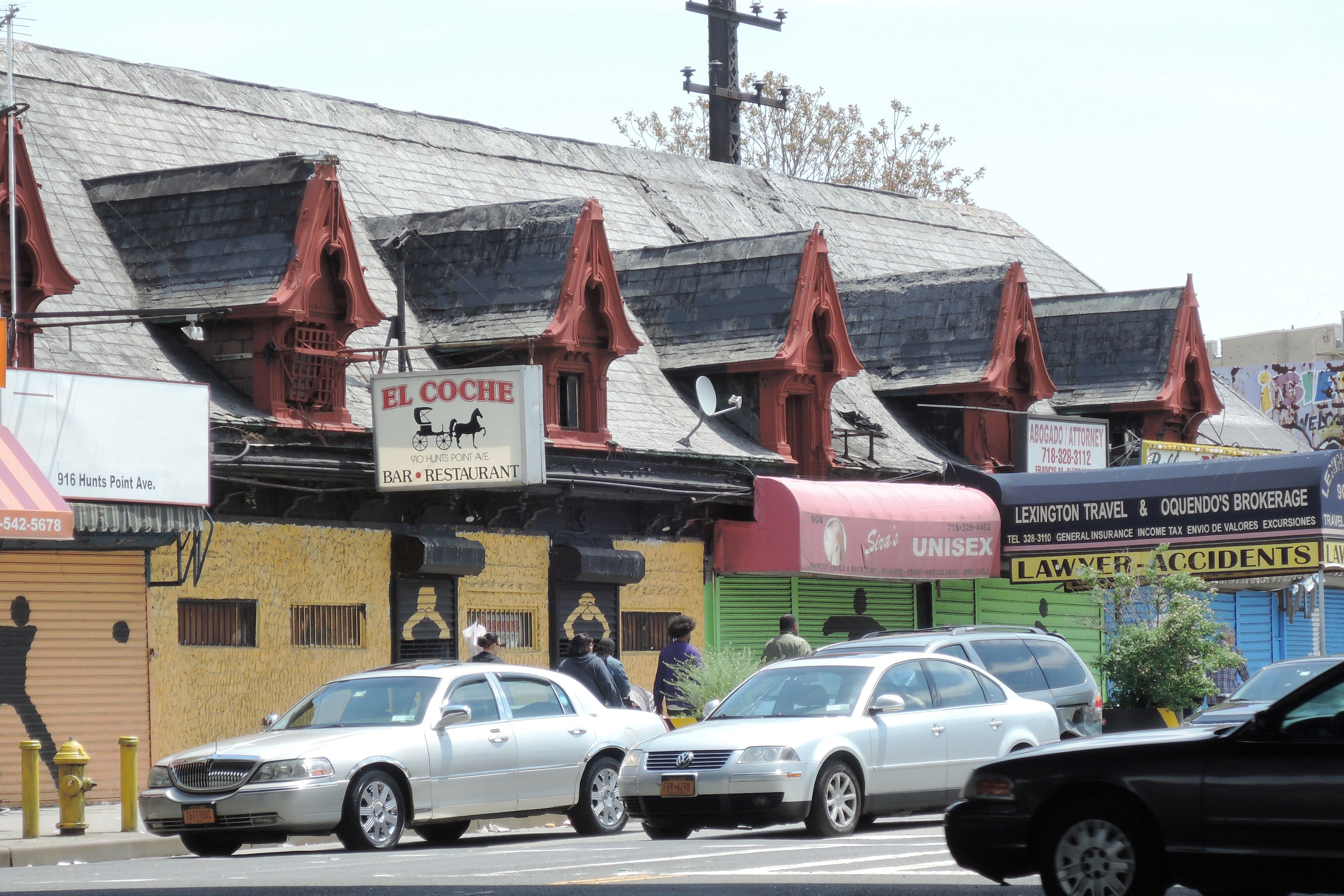
Hunts Point Avenue station, now serving shops

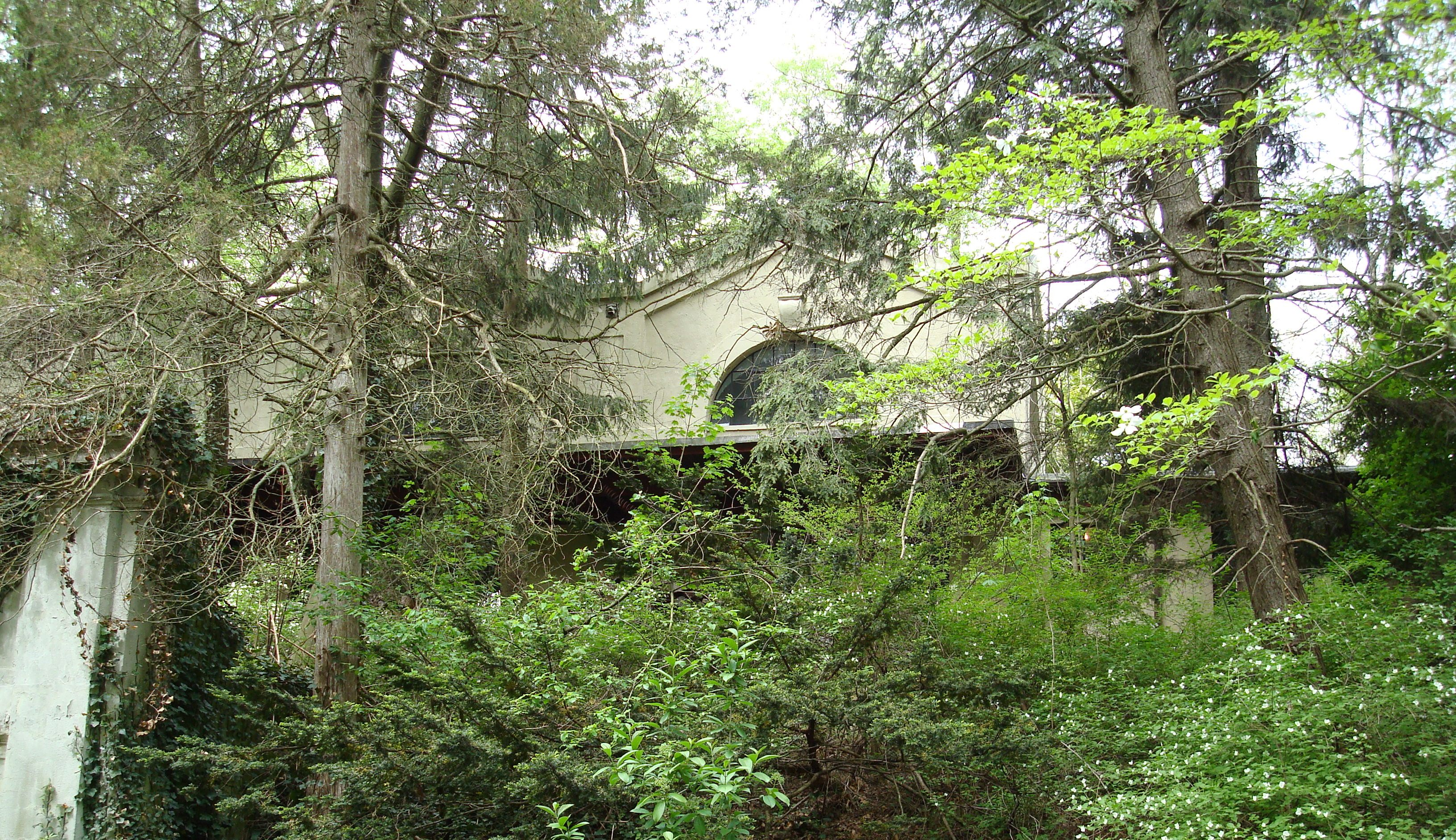
Quaker Ridge station house

=== Bronx ===
The portion of the railway in the Bronx north of the East 180th Street station is now used as the IRT Dyre Avenue Line, carrying 5 trains from East 180th Street to Eastchester-Dyre Avenue.

The former New York, Westchester and Boston Railroad Administration Building at 180th Street and Morris Park Road in the Bronx houses offices of the New York City Transit Authority.

There was an abandoned right-of-way from 180th to 177th Streets. The elevated structure (without tracks) went as far south as Lebanon Street. This connected to the New Haven Railroad main line near 174th Street south of the Cross-Bronx Expressway and remained an interchange between the IRT and New Haven Railroad, the last cars delivered via the 180th Street interchange were the Main Line R36s, with the interchange severed and out of service by 1979. Apartments have been built on the easement.

Between East 141st Street and East 133rd Street, just south of the Bruckner Expressway, in the Port Morris section of the Bronx, the roadbed is well preserved. One track remains, as do the bridges over roadways and the catenary structures for the tracks. South of 133rd Street, a freight stub breaks off from the Northeast Corridor, which is directly above the abandoned roadbed at this point. 40°48′0″N 73°54′47″W

In West Farms, catenary bridge #1, the first northbound catenary bridge after the NYW&B branched off of the NH, remains.

The abandoned head house of the demolished Westchester Avenue station still exists over the Hell Gate Line.

=== Larchmont/Town of Mamaroneck ===
The former Larchmont Gardens station on New Harmon Drive just off Weaver Street now houses a Girl Scouts facility.

=== Village of Mamaroneck ===
Concrete abutments for overpasses can be seen throughout Mamaroneck:

- At Jefferson Street near Station Plaza and Halstead Avenue.
- Over the Mamaroneck River just west of Jefferson St. and east of the station.
- At Mamaroneck Avenue. There is a staircase cut-out in the side of the wall on the east side.
- At Fenimore Road and Hoyt Avenue.

The extended catenary structures used in locations where the NH and NYW&B shared rails still exist in many places, though the catenary tower stub for the outermost track may be missing. The location of the station houses in Mamaroneck and Harrison show space for the NYW&B right of way.

The tunnel leading to the NYW&B platforms from behind the Mamaroneck station is still there. The platforms were located where the current parking lot is.

The Mamaroneck Metro-North station was shared by both the New Haven and NYW&B.

=== Mount Vernon ===
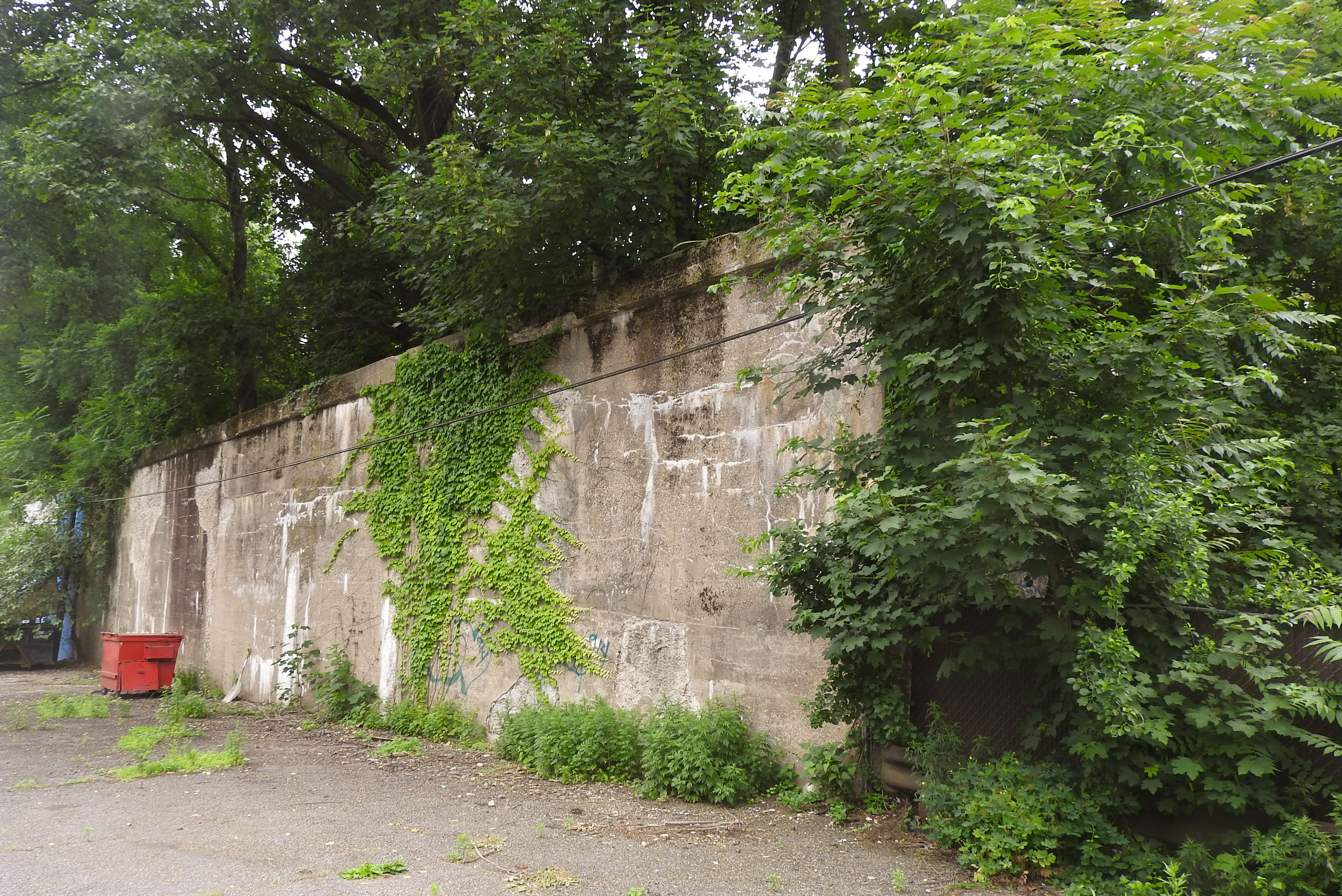
Columbus Avenue

Large concrete bridge abutments remain at Hutchinson Boulevard in northern Willson's Woods Park in Mount Vernon. Lorraine Terrace, a residential street, runs along the former rail line. Remains of the Columbus Avenue station in Mount Vernon, including the abutment on the north side of the NH line, are still in place.

Remains of the Kingsbridge Road station, north of the Bronx/Mount Vernon border, are in place; most of the sealed stationhouse and the elevated line remain intact.

=== New Rochelle ===
The former Quaker Ridge Station, at Stratton and Kewanee Roads, is now a private residence surrounded by woodlands. The station's former driveway and turn-around remain but are now owned by the city for use as a public street. The house retains the two main platforms.

Some traces remain within the northwestern edge of Ward Acres Park, formerly the Ward family estate. The family used the railroad during its ownership, constructing a short rail siding for the loading and unloading of horses and associated equipment. A concrete block outbuilding, commonly referred to as "The Forge", is on the right of way in Ward Acres Park parallel to Broadfield Road. 40°57′27″N 73°47′2″W

There is also a small section of track, still intact, complete with wooden ties north of "The Forge"

A stone bridge in the southeastern woods of Ward Acres runs parallel to Pinebrook Boulevard. The bridge crosses a stream along the right of way between Wykagyl and Quaker Ridge and is in perfect condition.

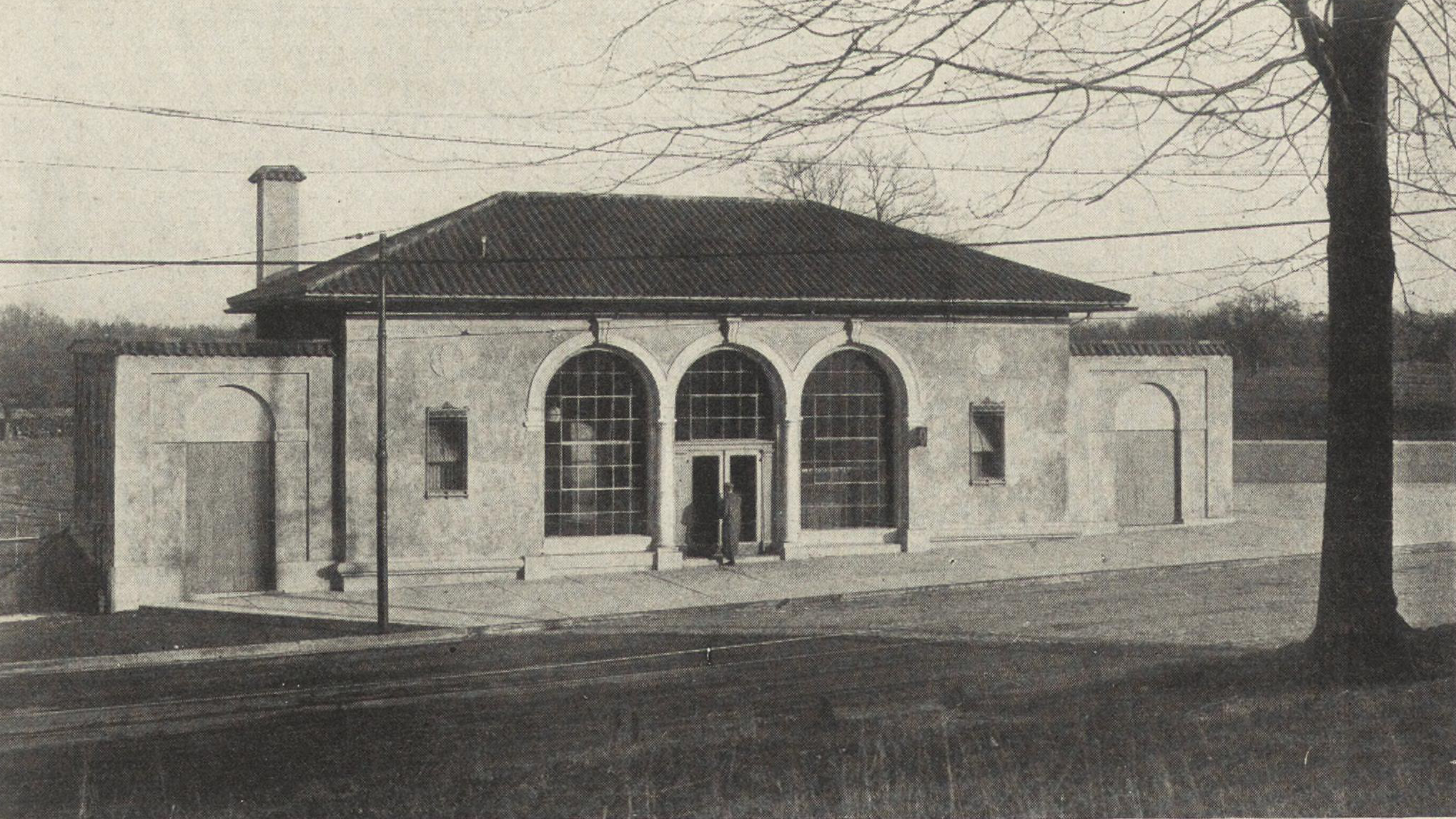
Wykagyl station, 1914

The former Wykagyl station is part of a shopping center on the east side of North Avenue near Quaker Ridge Road. The building suffered extensive damage after a three-alarm fire in April 2012 and now is no longer recognizable as a former station building. Wykagyl's commercial and retail area is entirely on property and track beds along the former NY&WB right of way, running under the Wykagyl Station and continuing eastward along Quaker Ridge Road.

==== White Plains Branch ====
The Heathcote Bypass runs from Weaver Street to Secor Road for 1.13 miles (1.82 km) on the right of way of the NYW&B, bypassing of a major intersection of three roads at the New Rochelle-Scarsdale border locally called The Five Corners.

==== New Rochelle Branch and Port Chester Extension ====
The former Remington Station on Webster Avenue in New Rochelle is used by retail stores.

The right of way west of the Remington Station to the Pelham border remains, paralleled on either side by residential streets (French Ridge and Sickles Avenue). Although obscured by surrounding homes, the large stretch of railroad property can be viewed using satellite mapping sites online (40°54′51″N 73°47′48″W).

The southbound I-95 exit and entrance ramps at Cedar Street in New Rochelle and the adjacent Memorial Highway access roads were built on the trackbed of the NYW&B's North Avenue station. When the New England Thruway [I-95] was first built (1956-1958), the station's concrete foundation on the east side of North Avenue was removed and a long entrance ramp joined North Avenue at a T intersection at grade. In the 1960s, the western foundation which contained the station house was demolished, and the Memorial Highway roadway and North Avenue overpass were completed to a traffic circle just west of the former station. Prior to the highway construction, the fill west of the North avenue station had been removed to provide space for barracks-style housing for returning World War II veterans.

A concrete abutment and retaining wall, the western part of a NYW&B overpass, remains as of December 2012, on Prince Street, approximately midway between Remington Station and North Avenue station.

One side of an overpass which carried a street over both the New Haven and NYW&B still remains behind a Stop & Shop on Palmer Avenue. It is right next to the former Pine Brook Station. It can be seen from I-95 west of the toll plaza, or off the Petersville Rd bridge.

=== Pelham ===
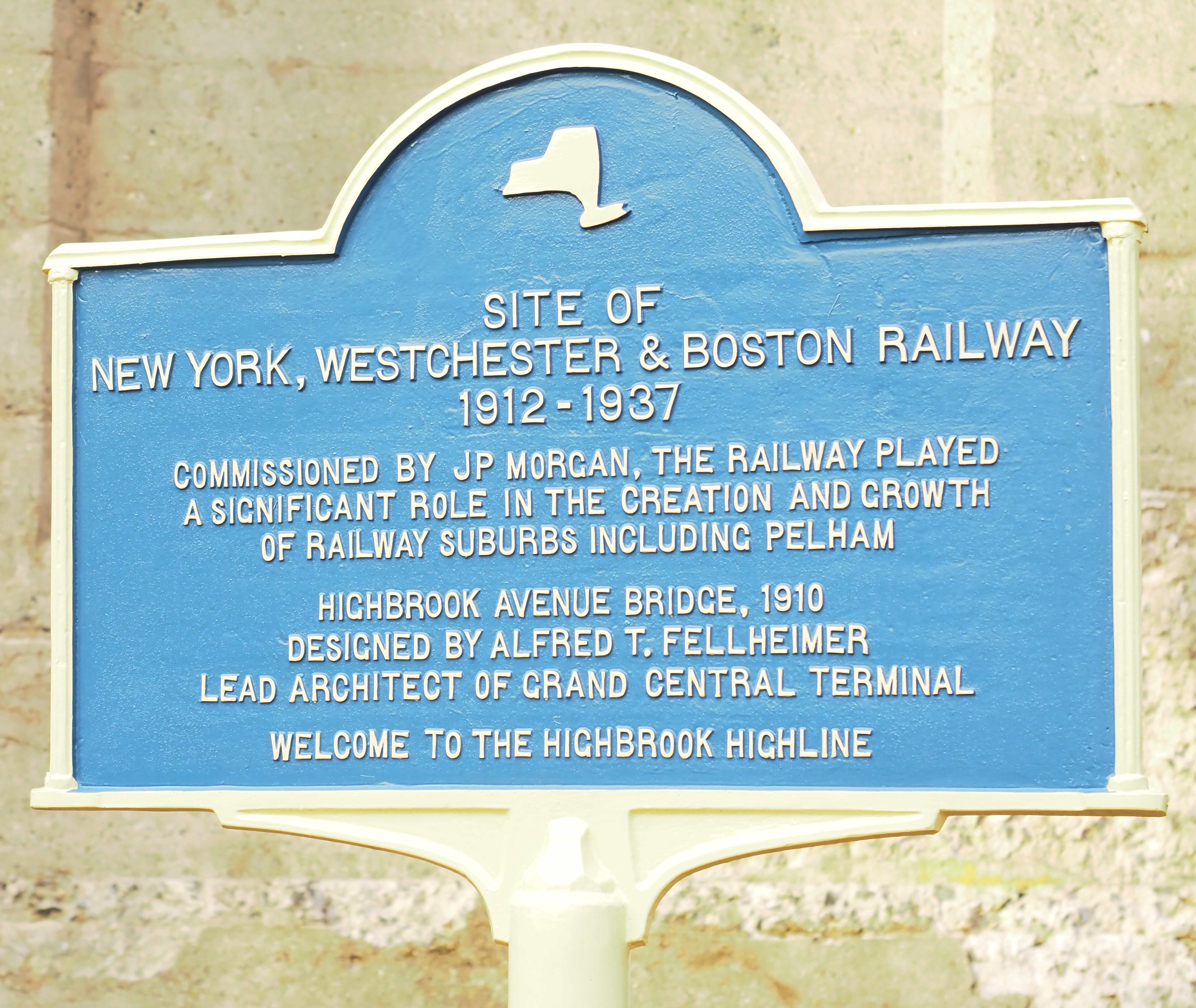
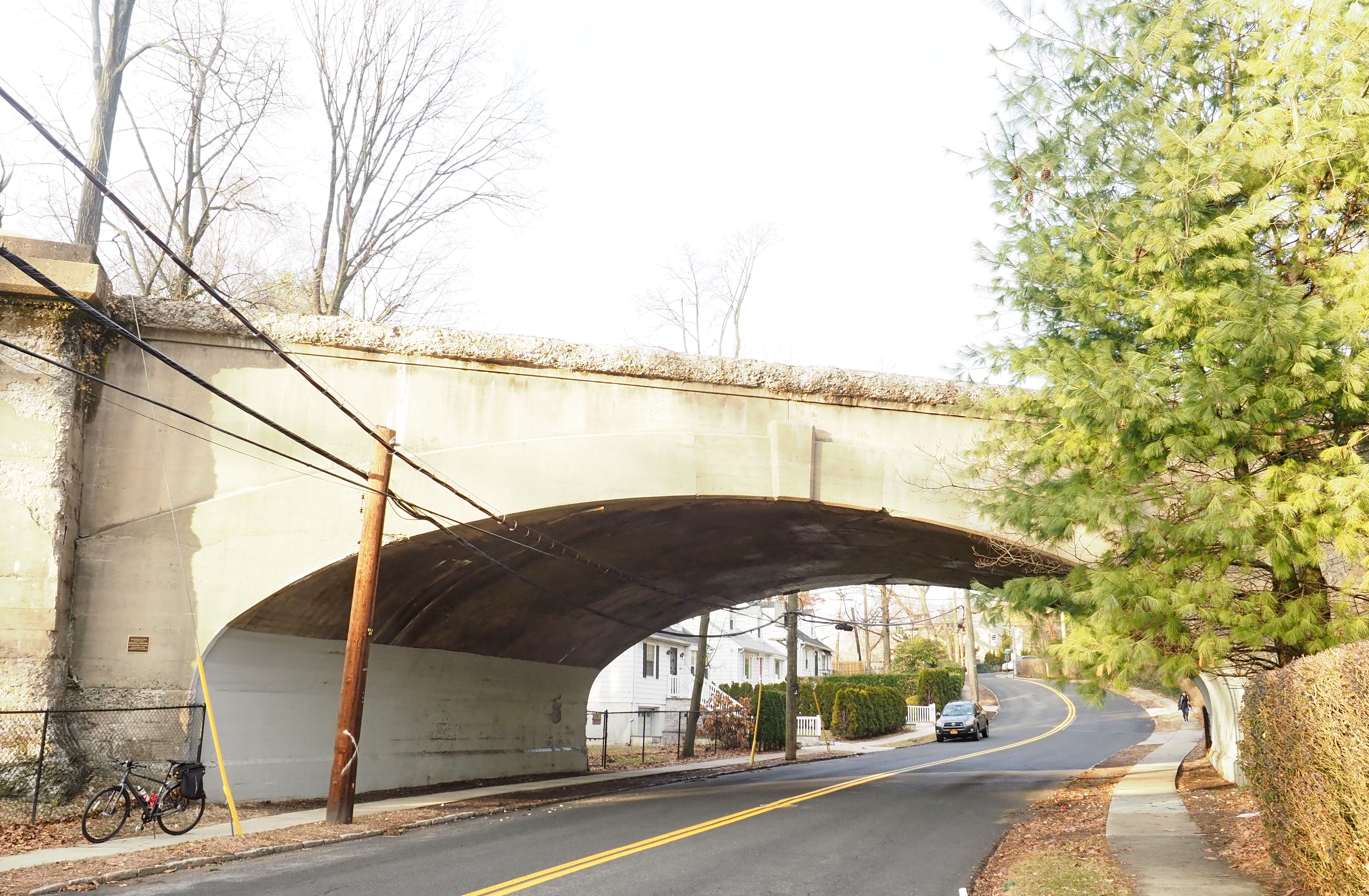
Plaque (left) on Highbrook Avenue bridge (right)

On Highbrook Avenue near the intersection of Harmon is a still extant bridge which carried the NYW&B tracks (40.913613°N 73.804852°W). The bridge is being preserved by a group named "The Highbrook Highline" It is west of the NYW&B's Remington Station.

=== Scarsdale ===
The former Heathcote station, located at a major intersection of three roads at the New Rochelle-Scarsdale border locally called "Five Corners," now houses Real Living Five Corners Real Estate. On May 28, 2012, the Village of Scarsdale issued an official proclamation to recognize the 100th anniversary of the building.

The Heathcote Bypass runs from Weaver Street to Secor Road for 1.13 miles (1.82 km) on the right of way of the NYW&B, bypassing The Five Corners.

=== White Plains ===
Much of the roadbed three blocks east of and roughly parallel to Old Mamaroneck Road in White Plains south of the former Mamaroneck Avenue station to the city border with Scarsdale is the White Plains Greenway, a pedestrian trail.

== See also ==
- Railroad electrification in the United States
- IRT Dyre Avenue Line

== Sources ==
- Arcara, Roger (1985). Westchester's Forgotten Railway, 1912-1937: The story of a short-lived short line which was at once America's finest railway and its poorest: The New York, Westchester & Boston Railway. I & T Pub..
- Arcara, Roger (1964). When the Westchester Was New: A supplement to Westchester's Forgotten Railway Journal and Railway Age Gazette. Consisting of reproductions of seven articles about the New York, Westchester & Boston Railway Company from 1912 issues of Electric Railway. Electric Railroaders' Association.
- Bang, Robert A. (1987). Westchester County's Million-Dollar-a-Mile Railroad. R.A. Bang.
- Bang, Robert A. (2004). The New York, Westchester & Boston Railway, 1906-1946. R.A. Bang.
- Harwood, Herbert H. (2008). J.P. Morgan's Magnificent Mistake:The New York, Westchester & Boston Railway. Herbert H. Harwood. Publisher: Indiana University Press.
