= Willson's Woods Park =

Park in Mount Vernon, New York

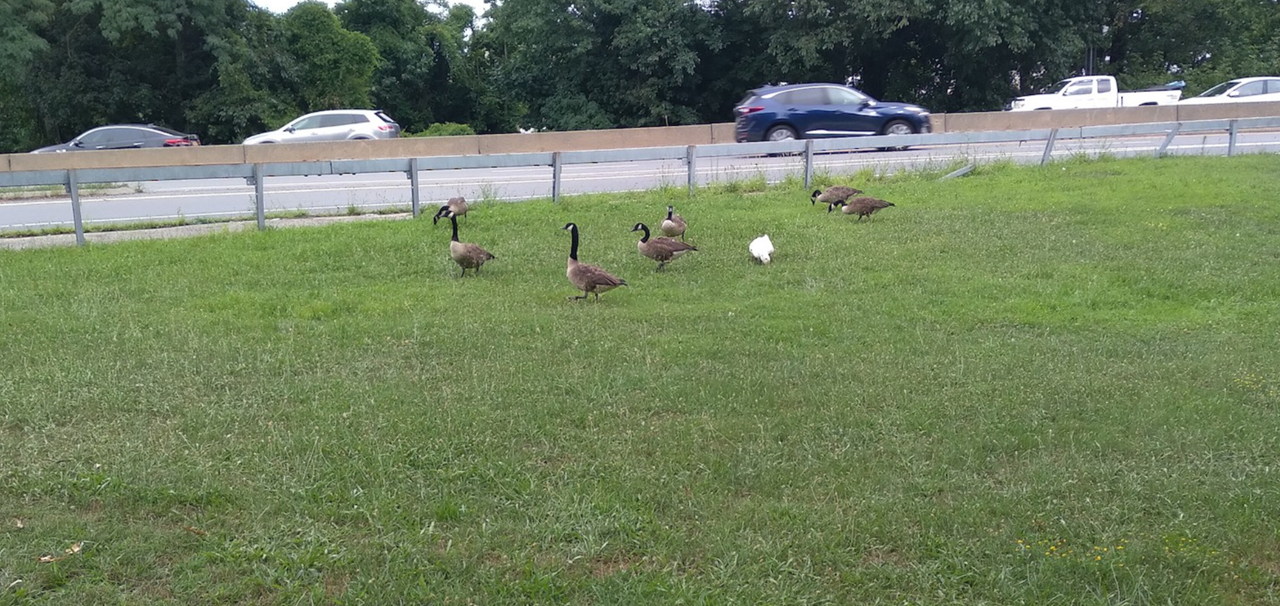
- Canada Geese and a Pekin Domestic Duck feeding by the highway at Willson's Woods Park.
- Interactive map of Willson's Woods Park
- Location: Mount Vernon, New York, United States
- Coordinates: 40°54′48″N 73°49′01″W
- Area: 23 acres (9.3 ha)
- Created: 1924
- Operator: Westchester County Department of Parks, Recreation and Conservation

Willson's Woods Park is a park located in Mount Vernon, New York. The Park is owned by Westchester County and operated by its Department of Parks, Recreation and Conservation. Acquired in 1924, Willson's Woods is one of the oldest parks in the County's parks system. The Park was named for the former owner of the land, Charles Hill Willson of the Willson & Adams Lumber Company. The park is flanked to the east by the Hutchinson River Parkway and by Pelham Lake. It was built with the northern entrance passing under the now defunct New York, Westchester and Boston Railway line, and the southern under the still working New Haven Line.

The park's 23 acres (9.3 ha) contain amenities and facilities for a variety of activities, including birding, fishing, walking, ice skating, picnicking, and swimming. In 2010, Willson's Woods received the highest inspection scores out of all the county's active parks.

Willson's Woods Park contains all of Pelham Lake, the only lake in the city of Mount Vernon.

More than 50 species of birds have been seen at Willson's Woods. The most common as of January 2021 are Mallards. However more Canada Geese have been seen than any other bird in the past. Up to 250 geese have been seen in one flock. A resident Pekin lived at the park from sometime before July 2020 until September 2020.

== Swimming Facility ==
Willson's Woods Park has been home to a swimming facility since 1928.

The construction of a one-million-gallon swimming pool and two-story, Tudor Revival style bathhouse on the Park's property began in 1927. Construction was completed in 1928, and the facility opened on Independence Day of that year under the name Willson's Woods Pool. A swimming competition was held at the Pool on opening day.

Following the summer of 2004, Willson's Woods Pool underwent a major renovation, transforming it into what the Department of Parks, Recreation and Conservation has called an "aquatic playground." Although the bathhouse remained virtually the same, the old pool was replaced with a wave pool, two eighteen-foot water slides, a small pool and play structure for young children (called the Aqua Playground), and a splash pad (called the Sprayground). The new facility opened for the summer of 2005 under the name Willson's Waves. The original plans for the renovation included two additional water slides and had the wave pool being a larger size; however, these aspects of the project had to be abandoned due to monetary reasons.

In most instances, people wishing to enter Willson's Waves must possess an identity card called a Park Pass. Park Passes are available for purchase by residents of Westchester County at the facility during its operating season as well as at various locations throughout the County. People using one of the Park's reserved picnic areas can use their picnic permit in place of a Park Pass for the day of their reservation. Residents of the County who would like to enter Willson's Waves but do not wish to purchase a Park Pass can pay a higher admission rate as along as they present sufficient identification and proof of their residency in the County; however, people who enter in this manner are not allowed to bring other adults or children into the facility with them. Park Pass holders have the option of purchasing a Season Swim Pass for an additional fee; the Season Swim Pass, valid for one summer, allows an individual or a family to pay a single upfront fee instead of paying admission on a daily basis.

There currently are plans to expand Willson's Waves by adding the two water slides that were intended to be part of the 2004 renovation. In addition, replicas of the original bathhouse windows are to be installed, but no further improvements are planned for the bathhouse in order to maintain the building's architectural aesthetic and have it declared a historic site of some kind.

== Picnicking ==
Located in Willson's Woods Park are areas that are available for use for group picnics. Reservations must be made in advance with the Group Permit Office of the Department of Parks, Recreation and Conservation by either a resident of Westchester County or a business that is located in the County. The Park has three picnic areas, each able to accommodate up to seventy-five people, located on its southeastern property. There also is a pavilion, called DeMatteo Terrace (in honor of "valued County employee" Charles "Chuck" J. DeMatteo), located on the second story of Willson's Waves bathhouse that can hold up to one hundred people.
