= Port Chester station =

Metro-North Railroad station in New York

Port Chester
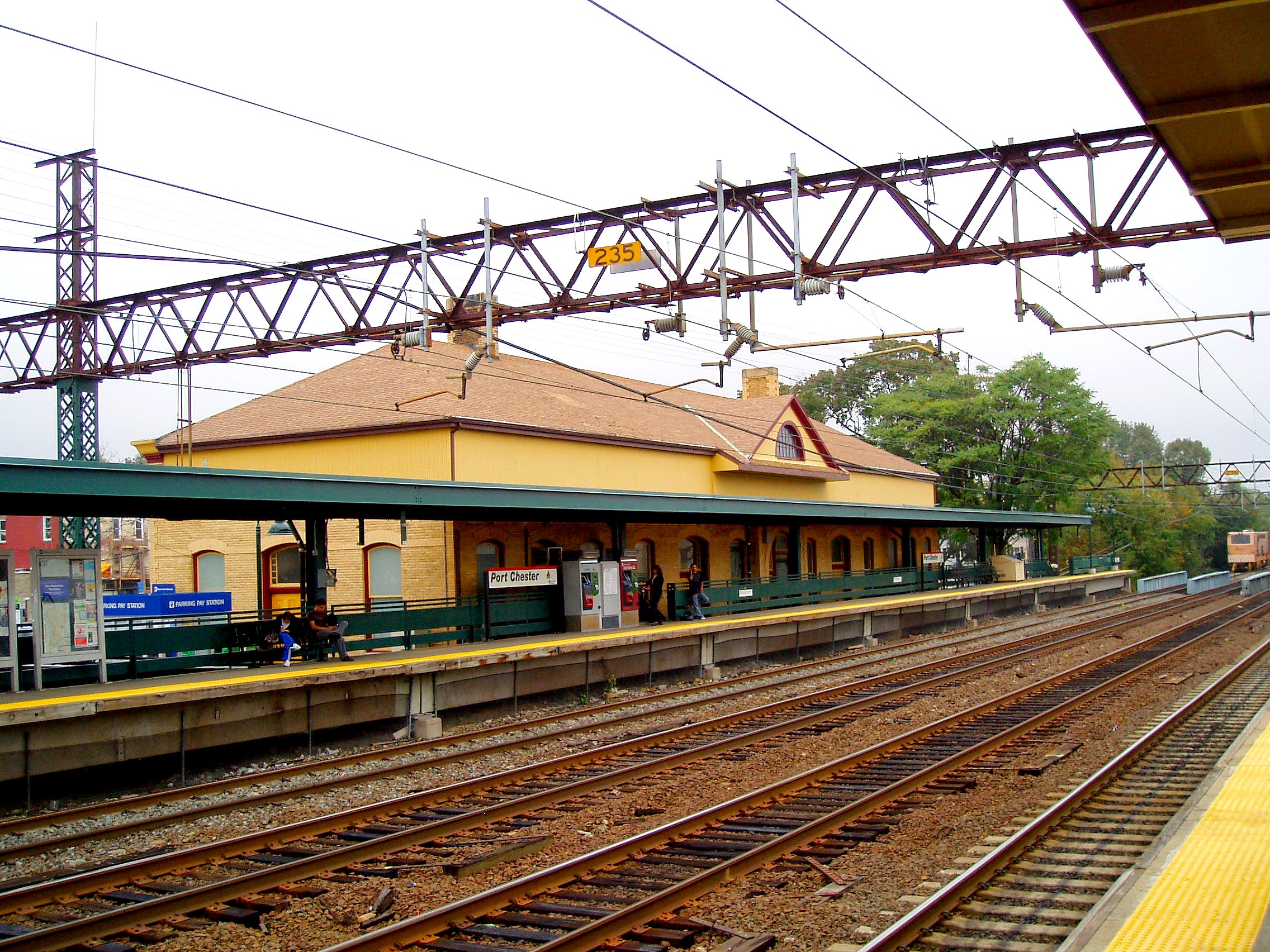
- Port Chester station in October 2011

General information
- Location: 3 Broad Street; Port Chester, New York
- Coordinates: 41.00178°N 73.66470°W
- Owner: Metropolitan Transportation Authority
- Line: MTA New Haven Line (Northeast Corridor)
- Platforms: 2 side platforms
- Tracks: 4
- Connections: Bee-Line Bus System: 13, 61; CT Transit Stamford: 11A, 11B, 311, 311B

Construction
- Parking: 811 spaces
- Accessible: Yes

Other information
- Fare zone: 14

History
- Opened: December 25, 1848
- Rebuilt: 1890

Passengers
- 2018: 3,253 daily boardings

Services
Preceding station	Metro-North Railroad	Following station
Rye toward Grand Central	New Haven Line	Greenwich toward Stamford
Former services
Preceding station	New York, New Haven and Hartford Railroad	Following station
Rye toward New York	Main Line	Greenwich toward New Haven
Preceding station	New York, Westchester and Boston Railway	Following station
Rye toward Harlem River via Columbus Avenue	Port Chester Branch	Terminus
Location

Port Chester station is a commuter rail station on the Metro-North Railroad New Haven Line, located in Port Chester, New York. The station is the northernmost station on the line in New York before crossing into Connecticut. The station has two high-level side platforms, each 10 cars long, serving the outer tracks of the four-track Northeast Corridor.

== History ==
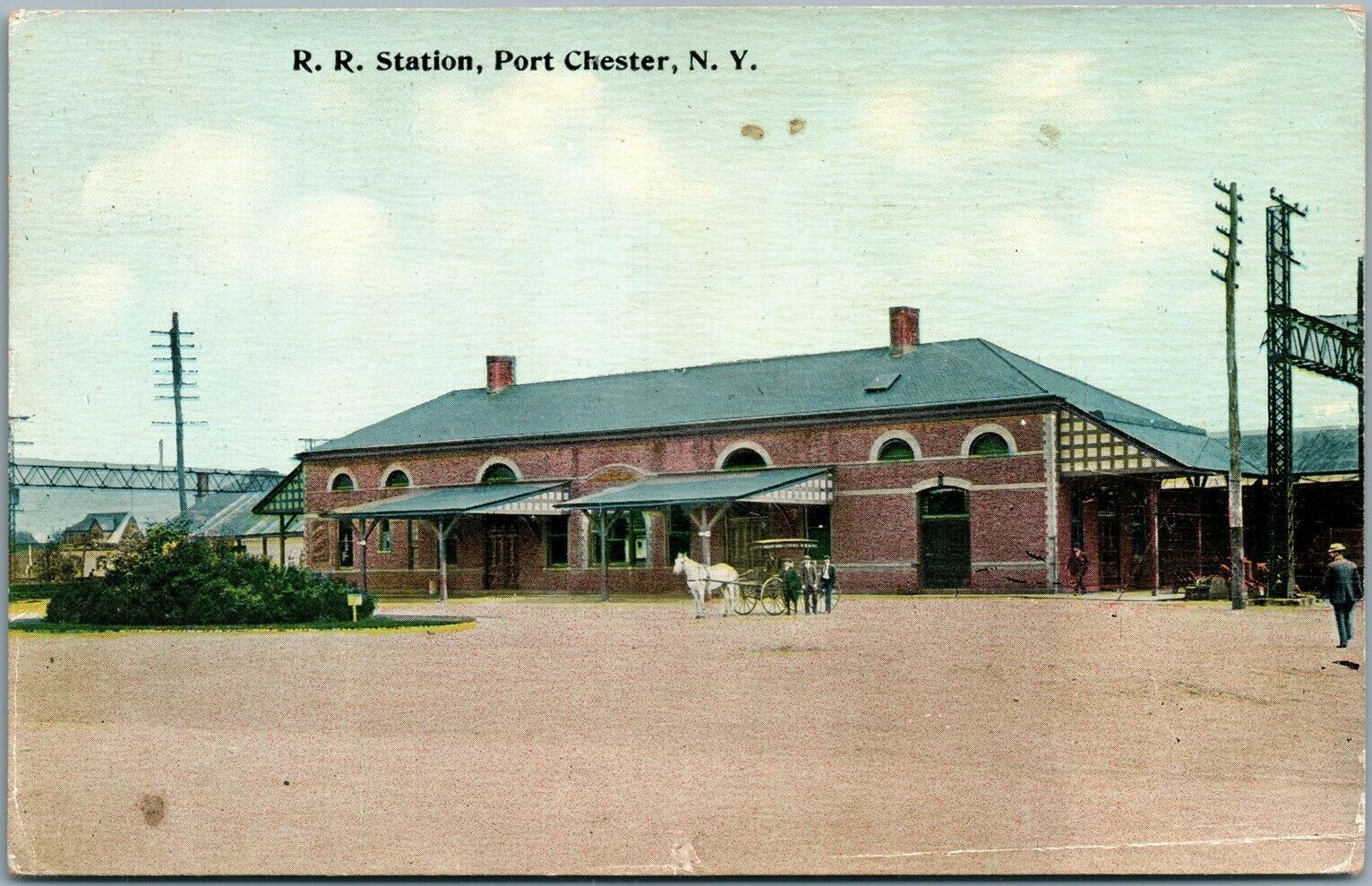
Early 20th century postcard of the station

The New York and New Haven Railroad laid tracks through Port Chester in the late-1840s. The current station building was constructed in 1890 by its successor, the New York, New Haven, and Hartford Railroad. Between 1929 and 1937 it was located across Westchester Avenue from the terminal station of the Port Chester Branch of the New York, Westchester and Boston Railway. Today that former station is the home of the Girtman Memorial Church of the Living God.

As with all New Haven Line stations in Westchester County, the station became a Penn Central station upon acquisition by Penn Central in 1969, and eventually became part of the MTA's Metro-North Railroad in 1983. A restoration project was carried out in 2009. In late 2017 an elevator was opened on the Westchester Avenue side of the station for access to the Northbound platform. The station building hosts a restaurant.

Under the 2015–2019 Metropolitan Transportation Authority Capital Plan, the station, along with four other Metro-North Railroad stations, received a complete overhaul as part of the Enhanced Station Initiative. Updates included cellular service, Wi-Fi, USB charging stations, interactive service advisories, and maps. The renovations at Port Chester station cost $13.2 million and were completed by the end of February 2019.
