= Willis Avenue station =

New York City Subway station in The Bronx (closed 1924)

Willis Ave.

General information
- Location: East 132nd Street and Willis Avenue; Port Morris, The Bronx, New York
- Coordinates: 40°48.32′0″N 73°55.57′0″W
- System: Former Manhattan Railway elevated station
- Operator: Interborough Rapid Transit Company
- Line: Willis Avenue Branch
- Platforms: 2 side platforms, 1 island platform
- Tracks: 4
- Connections: Harlem River (NHRR-NYW&B station)

Construction
- Structure type: Elevated

History
- Opened: November 25, 1886; 139 years ago
- Closed: April 14, 1924; 102 years ago

Former services
Preceding station	Interborough Rapid Transit	Following station
129th Street Terminus	Willis Avenue Shuttle	Terminus
Preceding station	New York, New Haven and Hartford Railroad	Following station
Terminus	Harlem River Branch	Port Morris toward New Rochelle
Preceding station	New York, Westchester and Boston Railway	Following station
Terminus	Main Line	Port Morris toward White Plains or Port Chester via Columbus Avenue
Location

The Willis Avenue station was an elevated rapid transit station of the Willis Avenue Spur that branched off of the IRT Third Avenue Line in the Bronx, New York City, United States. It opened in 1886 and closed in 1924.

== History ==
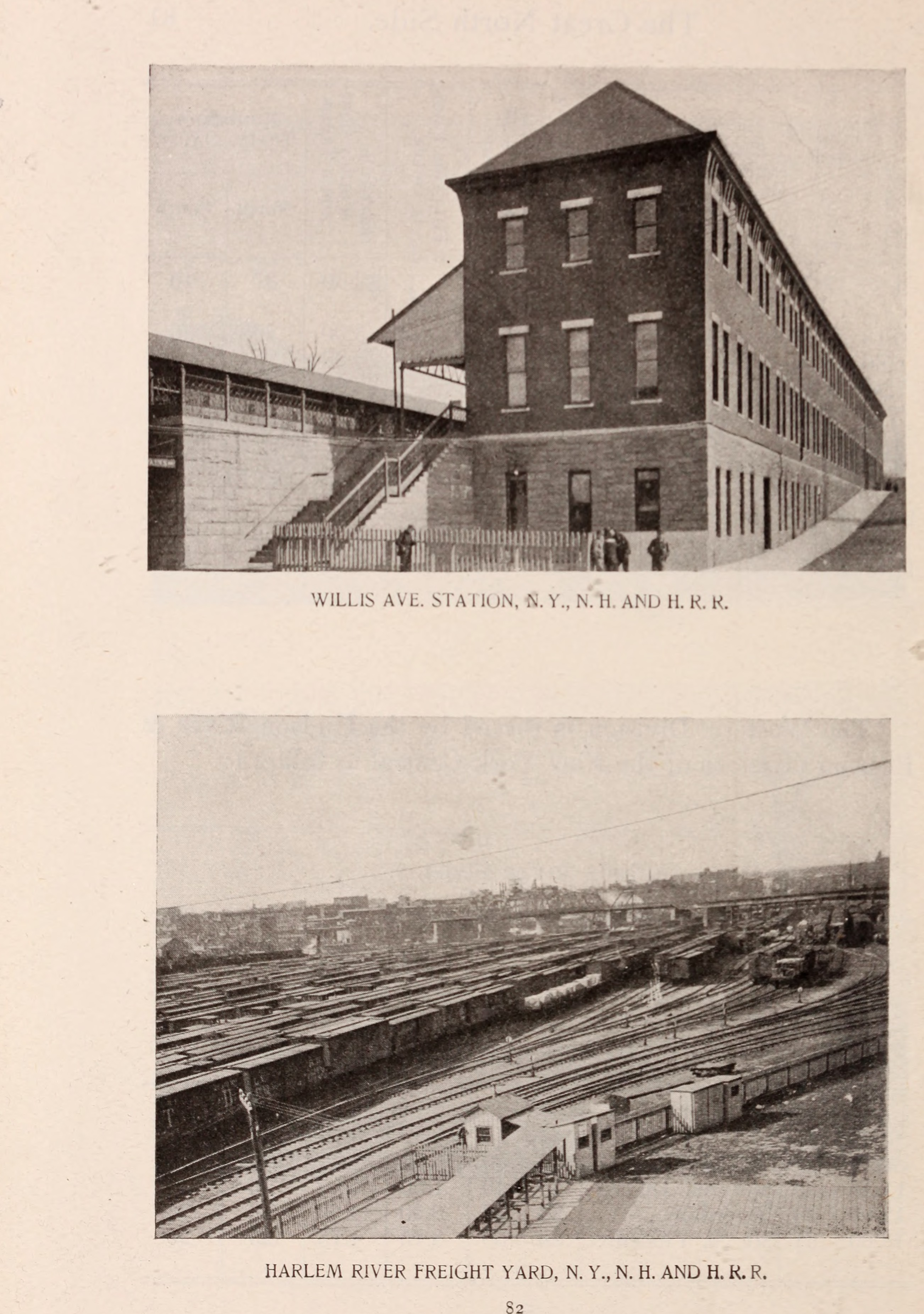
The Willis Avenue station (top).

Willis Avenue station was opened on November 25, 1886, by the Suburban Rapid Transit Company as a connecting spur to the Harlem River and Port Chester Railroad's Harlem River Terminal Station. The HR&PC was chartered 20 years earlier and operated trains owned by the New York, New Haven and Hartford Railroad. The station was located next to the 133rd Street Yard, and served both the Second and Third Avenue line trains. The spur ran from the 129th Street Station in Manhattan across the Harlem River Bridge, thereby creating two separate transportation hubs on both sides of the Harlem River. Suburban Rapid Transit was acquired by the Manhattan Railway Company in 1891, and then by the Interborough Rapid Transit Company in 1902. By 1912, the station would also begin to serve the New York, Westchester and Boston Railway, an electrified commuter line serving the Bronx and southern Westchester County. Despite the name the railroad never actually reached Boston. For the next decade the station became a vital link not only for rapid transit commuters, but interurban, commuter rail, and intercity rail passengers.

The station was closed for IRT service on April 14, 1924, when a connecting pedestrian bridge was opened between the nearby Third Avenue El station at 133rd Street, although the Third Avenue Line continued to cross the Harlem River until 1955. The HR&PC was officially merged with the New Haven Railroad on January 1, 1927. Harlem River Station continued to serve the New Haven Railroad and New York, Westchester and Boston Railway until 1930 when the NYNH&H left, and was closed completely on December 31, 1937, when the NYW&B fell into bankruptcy.

== See also ==
- Harlem River Intermodal Yard
