= Surrounded =

Surrounded may refer to:

== Books ==
- The Surrounded, a 1936 novel by D'Arcy McNickle
- Surrounded, a 1974 novel by Dean Koontz writing as Brian Coffey

== Films ==
- Surrounded (1960 film), a Norwegian film directed by Arne Skouen
- Surrounded (2023 film), an American film directed by Anthony Mandler

== Web Series ==
- Surrounded (web series), an American web series produced by Jubilee Media

== Music ==
- Surrounded (band), an alternative rock/space rock band from Sweden

=== Albums ===
- Surrounded, an album by Checkfield 2003
- Surrounded (Björk album), 2006
- Surrounded, an album by Men of Standard, 2006, or the title song
- Surrounded (Richard Buckner album), 2013, or the title song
- Surrounded (Michael W. Smith album), 2018
- Surrounded, an album by Justin Sullivan (singer of New Model Army), 2021

=== Songs ===
- "Surrounded" (Chantal Kreviazuk song), 1996
- "Surrounded", a song by The Chills, 1996
- "Surrounded", a song by Syl Johnson
- "Surrounded", a song by As I Lay Dying from the 2001 album Beneath the Encasing of Ashes
- "Surrounded", a song by Dream Theater from the 1992 album Images and Words
- "Surrounded", a song by Reks from the 2016 album The Greatest X
- "Surrounded", a song by Wage War from the 2016 album Blueprints (Anniversary Edition bonus track)
