= Zander Moricz =

American social activist

- Born: 2003 (age 22–23)
- Occupation: Social activist
- Known for: Graduation speech, fighting "Don't Say Gay" law
- Website: http://www.seeourpower.org/

Zander Moricz is an American social activist. He gained national attention in 2022 for a graduation speech in which he used his curly hair as a metaphor for his experiences as a gay man, after being instructed not to discuss his sexual orientation.

== Life ==
Moricz was born in Florida. He attended Pine View School, where he became the school's first openly gay class president and held the position for four years. He credited his intention to run for class president in middle school with a conversation with a teacher. He is attending Harvard University and pursuing a degree in Political Science and Government. Moricz is currently taking a gap year to work full-time in politics.

== Graduation ==
Moricz graduated from Pine View School in 2022, where he gave the keynote speech for his class' graduation. In his speech, he detailed his social activism through years of rallying, gaining supporters, and being a plaintiff against the Parental Rights in Education Act, or more commonly known as the "Don't Say Gay" law. He makes an allusion to his curly hair to his orientation as a gay man and his struggle with his orientation of being closeted and homophobia.

After his graduation, Moricz revealed in a X thread that prior to his graduation speech, his principal took him into his office and warned that if he referred to his orientation or his social activism in his speech, the speech would be cut and the graduation event would be cancelled. He described this as 'censorship,' and being 'silenced' for his talking about his orientation.

After discussing his situation, he had gained support online from friends. Former Secretary of Transportation Pete Buttigieg wrote him a personal letter of support.

== Activism ==
In 2019, Moricz founded the Social Equity through Education Alliance, formerly the Social Equity and Education Initiative, a student rights non-profit organization.

In 2022, after the Parental Rights in Education Act passed in the Florida House and Senate, Moricz hosted a walkout and rally against the law. He gained support from Tom Kirdahy from the rally. Moricz later became a plaintiff in a lawsuit seeking to invalidate the law.

In 2023, Moricz called on Sarasota Country School Board Member and Moms for Liberty co-founder Bridget Ziegler to resign due to poor management as a board member. Ziegler received other calls to resign due to a recent sex scandal.

In 2026, Moricz hosted a protest against the Sarasota County School Board due to a proposal from Ziegler to have the district comply with U.S. Immigration and Customs Enforcement.
