= Alex O'Connor =

English podcaster and YouTuber (born 1999)

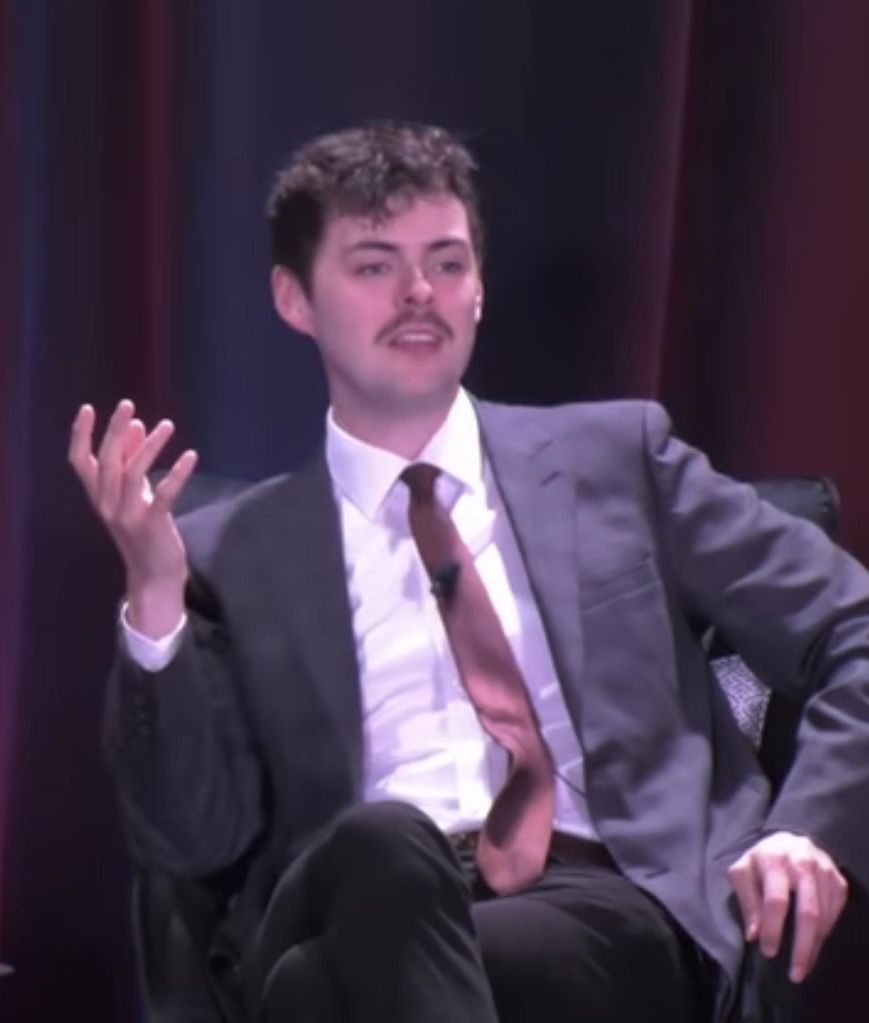
- O'Connor in July 2025
- Born: Alex J. O'Connor; 27 March 1999 (age 27)
- Education: St John's College, Oxford (BA)

YouTube information
- Channel: Alex O'Connor
- Years active: 2013–present
- Genres: Religion, philosophy, podcasting
- Subscribers: 2.02 million
- Views: 424 million
- Alex O'Connor's voice O'Connor debates Cliffe Knechtle on the historicity of Matthew 27:52. Recorded December 2024
- Last updated: 27 August 2026
- Website: alexoconnor.com

Alex J. O'Connor (born 27 March 1999), also known as CosmicSkeptic, is an English podcaster and YouTuber. He is known for his videos on philosophy on YouTube, most notably on the subjects of ethics, religion and atheism.

== Early life and education ==
Alex J. O'Connor was born on 27 March 1999, and is of Irish heritage. He grew up in Blackbird Leys, a civil parish and ward in Oxford, with divorced parents. He attended St John's College at the University of Oxford and graduated with a Bachelor of Arts degree in philosophy and theology in 2021.

== Career ==
O'Connor started his career by uploading videos on skateboarding to YouTube. By age seventeen, he was making videos on his channel CosmicSkeptic commenting on philosophy, religion and political topics like the 2016 United States presidential election. He started the Within Reason podcast (formerly called The Cosmic Skeptic Podcast) in 2019. His guests include Richard Dawkins, David Deutsch, Neil Degrasse Tyson, Sam Harris, Carlo Rovelli and Slavoj Žižek.

In October 2023 he interviewed journalist and commentator Peter Hitchens about drug decriminalisation, secularism and the British monarchy. Hitchens abruptly ended the interview and expressed his "active dislike" of O'Connor before leaving. O'Connor has participated in debates at the Oxford Union. In January 2025 he was featured in an episode of the American political debate series Surrounded by Jubilee Media, where he debated 25 Christians on the existence of God and the resurrection of Jesus.

== Views ==
O'Connor identifies as an agnostic atheist; he is known for his critique of theistic belief systems and for his long-form conversations on the subject. He often describes himself as an emotivist. He is a British republican, a subject he has spoken publicly on, including with Piers Morgan. O'Connor is a former vegan. He identifies as a geocentrist.
