= Straight Arrow (disambiguation) =

Straight Arrow may refer to:

- Straight Arrow, radio drama and comic book series
- Straight Arrow News, news website
- Straight Arrow Press, publishing company
- Straight arrows, nickname of the 42nd Field Artillery Regiment

== See also ==
- Straight as an Arrow, episode of the TV show King of the Hill
