= Dean Withers =

American political commentator (born 2004)

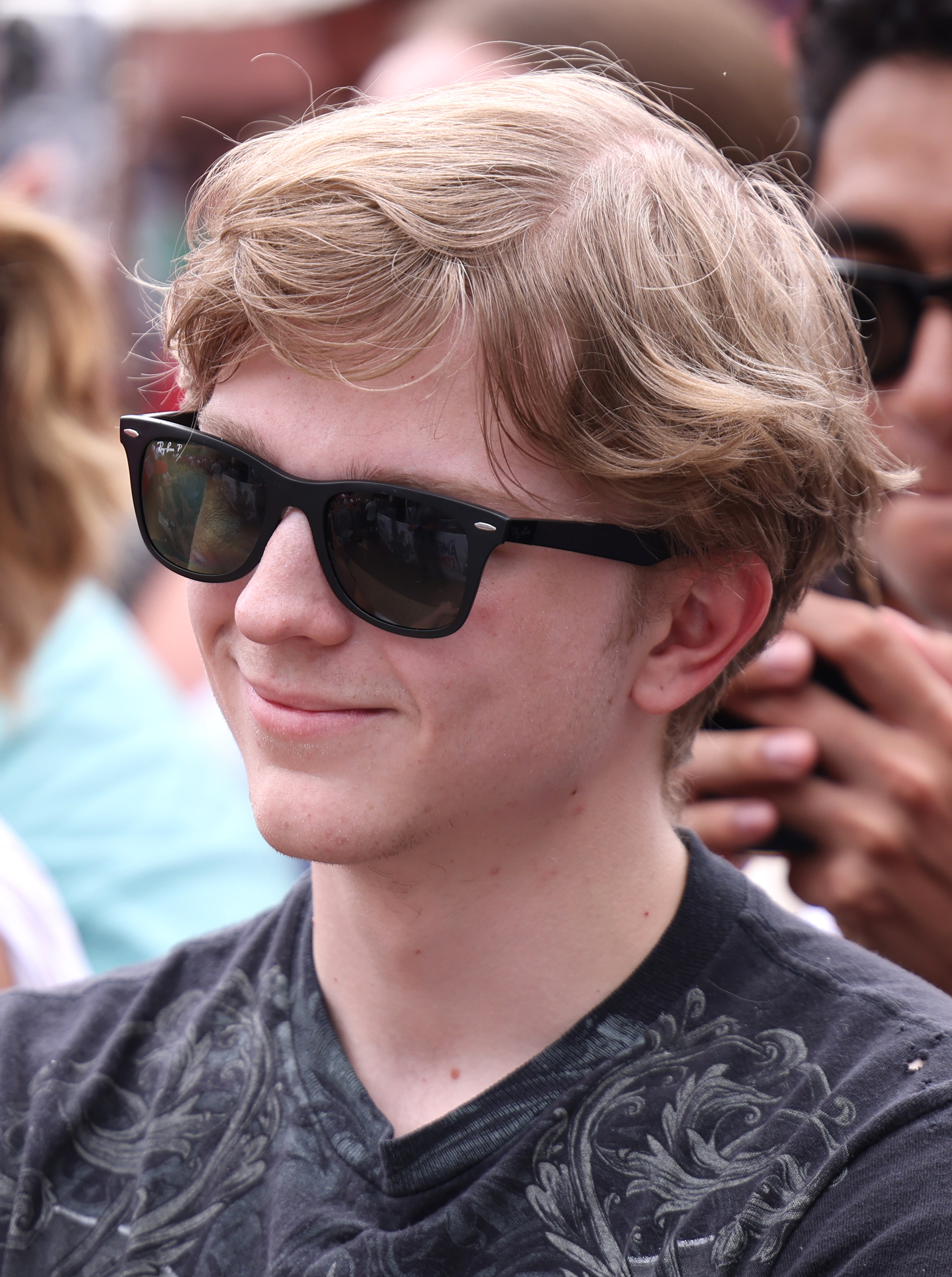
- Withers at Texas A&M University in 2025
- Born: September 1, 2004 (age 22)
- Known for: Online political debates
- Political party: Democratic
- Movement: Liberalism

Instagram information
- Page: deanwithrs
- Genre: Politics
- Followers: 3.7 million

Substack information
- Notes: @deanwithers
- Years active: 2025-present
- Topic: Politics
- Subscribers: 36,000

TikTok information
- Page: itsdeaann
- Years active: 2022–present
- Genre: Politics
- Followers: 8 million

X information
- Handle: @itsdeaann
- Display name: Dean Withers
- Years active: 2024-present
- Followers: 495,000

YouTube information
- Channel: deanwithrs
- Years active: 2023–present
- Genre: Politics
- Subscribers: 1 million
- Views: 128 million
- Last updated: November 4, 2026

Dean Withers (born September 1, 2004) is an American liberal political commentator and live streamer. He gained prominence starting in 2023 for challenging conservative viewpoints on societal issues through debates shared via TikTok and YouTube. Withers has been featured on Jubilee Media's YouTube series Surrounded, where he engages in political debates with conservatives.

== Early life ==
Withers was born on September 1, 2004. He grew up in Grand Junction, Colorado, with conservative family members, leading him to hold conservative views in his early life. Withers has said that his father is an engineer, his mother was often unemployed, and that he has two older siblings. He has also said that his parents divorced during his adolescence and that his family experienced financial difficulties. He attended church three times a week and a private Catholic school from preschool through eighth grade. Although he could not yet vote, he considered himself a supporter of Donald Trump.

Once he began attending a public high school in 2018, Withers' political views began to shift toward liberalism. He developed a friendship with a lesbian couple that conflicted with the anti-LGBTQ propaganda he had learned in Catholic school. Withers described the January 6 United States Capitol attack, which happened during his junior year, as "almost, like, the nail in the coffin." He now describes himself as an agnostic. Withers graduated from high school in 2022 and attended the University of Colorado Boulder, but dropped out after his sophomore year to dedicate more time to streaming prior to the 2024 United States presidential election.

== Career ==
External videos
- "Surrounded" episodes featuring Withers, from Jubilee via YouTube
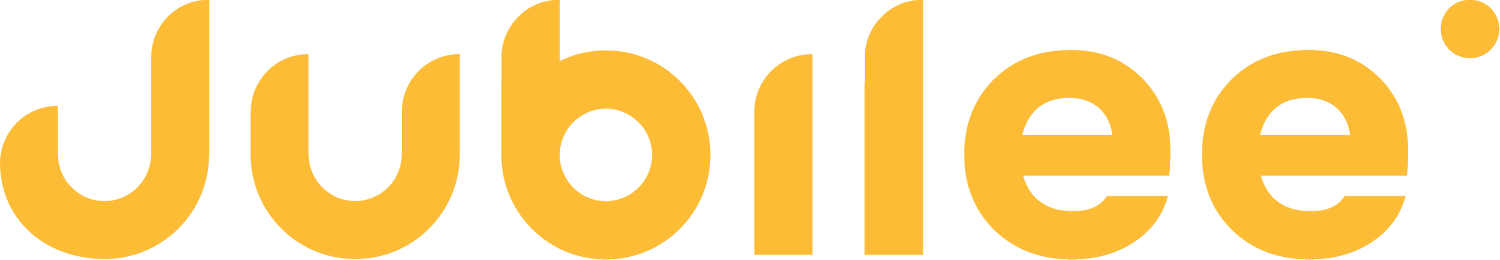
- "1 Conservative vs 25 Liberal College Students (Feat. Charlie Kirk)"
- "1 Liberal Teen vs. 20 Trump Supporters (Feat Dean Withers)"
- "Ben Shapiro vs. 25 Kamala Harris Voters"
- "1 Liberal Man vs 20 MAGA Women (ft. Dean Withers)"

The New York Times considers Withers to be part of an "ecosystem of left-leaning influencers", alongside Hasan Piker, Harry Sisson, and Parker Sedgwick. The latter is a friend of Withers.

After graduating from high school, Withers began posting political content on social media in 2022 on issues such as abortion and LGBTQ rights. Leading up to the 2024 presidential election, Jubilee Media featured Withers in two episodes of their Surrounded series on YouTube. He was one of 25 liberal college students who debated Charlie Kirk in the first episode and later returned to debate 20 Trump supporters in another episode.

In 2024, shortly after one of his appearances in a Jubilee episode where he debated Trump supporters, he was criticized online when racist and homophobic messages from 2019 and 2022 were uncovered. Withers later confirmed the messages were real and issued an apology.

Following an online dispute in July 2025, Withers was accused of doxing another content creator and encouraging viewers to contact Child Protective Services (CPS) on a livestream. He denied doxing the creator, stating he had only shared publicly available information.

Upon learning of the assassination of Charlie Kirk in September 2025, Withers cried during his livestream. His reaction went viral and generated criticism from some of his audience. In response, Withers posted a video explaining, "...I think Charlie Kirk was a bad person...but does that mean I think he deserves to lose his life? No." He said, "I am sad, distraught," and that gun violence "is always disgusting, always vile and always abhorrent".

In April 2026, Withers alleged that CBS News had filmed a debate with him in Washington, D.C. involving a MAGA influencer, but never aired the segment. He claimed Bari Weiss, who took over CBS News in October 2025, had shelved the production. CBS did not publicly respond to his claims.

In August 2026, various unsubstantiated rumors of sexual misconduct by Withers were circulated online, including an allegation that he had sexually assaulted a 13-year-old girl. The allegation included screenshots of supposed direct messages between Withers and the alleged victim which showed signs of possible fabrication. Withers publicly denied the allegation, sharing a video from a young girl with no connection to Withers who claimed that her photos were used by the alleged victim to impersonate her. Withers also stated that he had received death threats and was informed of a bomb threat by his local police department.

== Awards and nominations ==
Year	Award	Category	Result	Ref.
2026	The Streamer Awards	Best Vertical Live Streamer	Won	
