= Rye Neck Union Free School District =

School district in the U.S. state of New York

Location
- 310 Hornidge Road, Mamaroneck (Westchester County) New York 10543 United States
- Coordinates: 40.957596°N 73.715955°W

District information
- Type: Public
- Grades: Kindergarten to 12
- Superintendent: Michael Burke
- Schools: 4
- Budget: $51,127,223 (2024-2025 school year)
- NCES District ID: 3625290

Students and staff
- Students: 1423
- Teachers: 150
- Student–teacher ratio: 9.5

Other information
- Website: www.ryeneck.org

The Rye Neck Union Free School District is the school district created to serve the public education needs of parts of Mamaroneck and Rye, New York, United States. It serves the part of the Village of Mamaroneck that is within the Town of Rye and part of the City of Rye.

Rye Neck's district has four schools located on three different campuses, the middle and high schools being attached.

Rye Neck is known for its up-to-date technology in the classrooms, such as interactive whiteboards in every room, and its fully fiber optic network, provided by Optimum Lightpath, connecting every computer in the four schools. All are Schools of Excellence. The elementary school, F.E. Bellows, which teaches grades three through five, was named a Blue Ribbon School in 2009, one of 314 schools so honored across the country. Rye Neck High School was ranked #97 on Newsweek's 2005 list of the Best High Schools in America. The Rye Neck district was ranked 22nd out of over 8,700 school districts nationally in the Niche 2015 school district rankings. The Rye Neck Theatre Program is known for its award-winning musicals for over 30 years and has won multiple awards and nominations. Rye Neck High School was set to be named a Blue Ribbon School in 2025, however United States Department of Education (USDOE) notified all state education agencies that it had formally discontinued the national Blue Ribbon Schools program in August 2025.

The school district comprises two elementary schools serving grades K-5:

- Daniel Warren Elementary School for grades K to 2
- F. E. Bellows Elementary School for grades 3 to 5

There is one middle school serving grades 6-8:

- Rye Neck Middle School

There is one high school serving grades 9-12:

- Rye Neck High School

== See also ==
- Immediato v. Rye Neck School District
