= Adam Mockler =

American political commentator

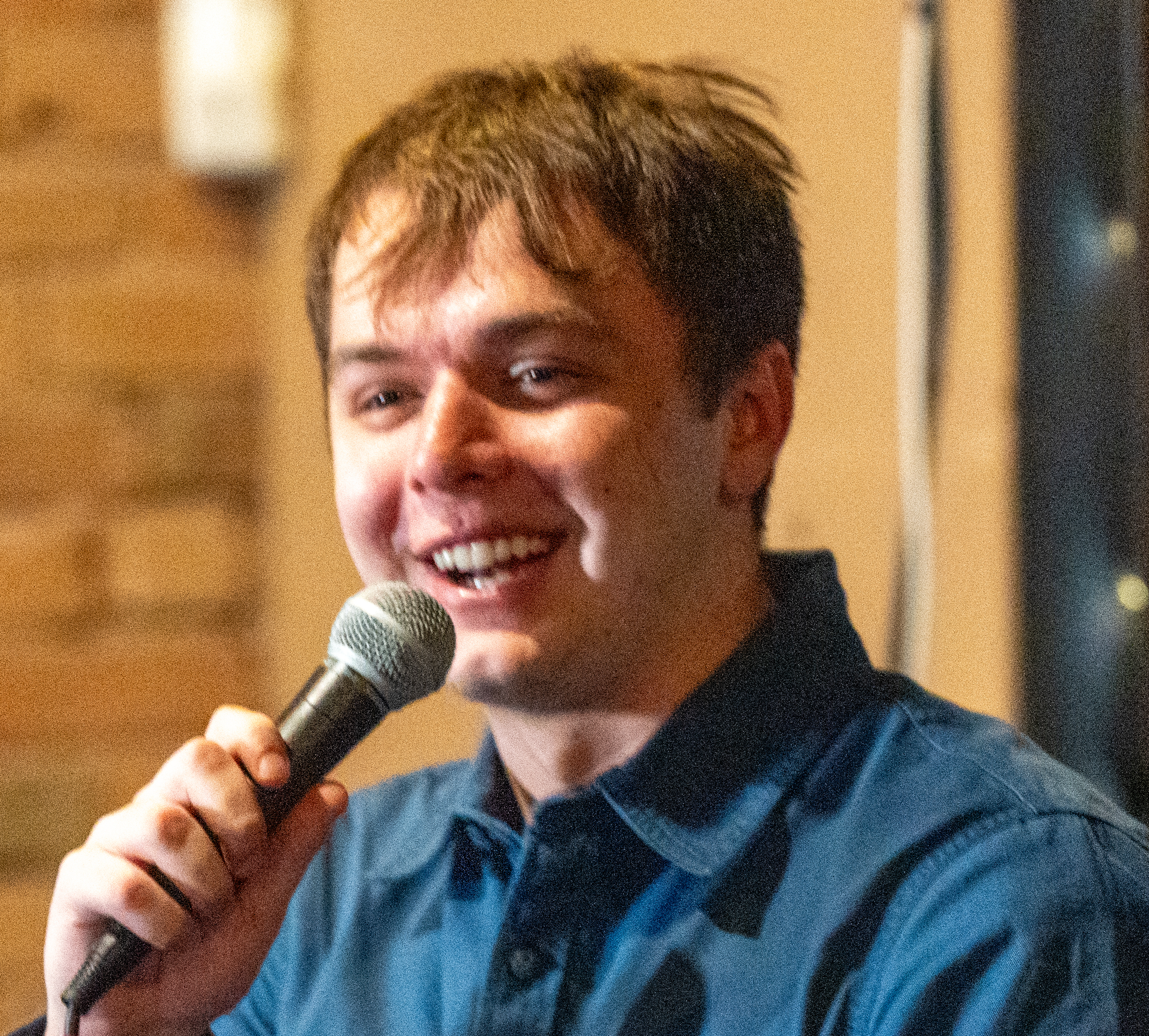
- Mockler in 2025
- Born: October 2, 2002 (age 24); Valparaiso, Indiana, U.S.
- Education: DePaul University (attended); Indiana University Northwest (attended)
- Occupations: Political commentator, YouTube host, digital media creator
- Known for: The Adam Mockler Show
- Political party: Democratic
- Website: www.adammockler.com

Adam Mockler (born October 2, 2002) is an American liberal political commentator, YouTube host, and digital media creator. He hosts The Adam Mockler Show, a YouTube-based political commentary program. His work focuses on United States politics, political media, and commentary on the Democratic Party, the Republican Party, and the movement surrounding Donald Trump.

Mockler has appeared on national programs including CNN's NewsNight with Abby Phillip and PBS's Firing Line with Margaret Hoover. Chicago magazine has noted his appearances on Piers Morgan Uncensored and Jubilee Media's debate series Surrounded.

== Early life ==
Mockler was born on October 2, 2002, in Valparaiso, Indiana. His father, Sam Ulayyet, is a Muslim-American of Syrian descent whose own father immigrated from Syria to the United States, and his mother, Stefanie Mockler, is an organizational psychologist, executive coach, and the founder of The Violet Group. She earned her Ph.D. in Leadership Psychology. She is also a Christian. At the time of his birth, Mockler's mother and father were 15 and 16 years old. His parents later separated and Mockler was raised by his mother. He attended high school in the Chicago area and later studied political science at Indiana University Northwest before transferring to DePaul University in Chicago. He left college after two years to pursue political content creation full-time.

== Career ==
Mockler created his official YouTube channel on April 15, 2013, and posted playing Minecraft and Call of Duty Let's Play videos, as well as videos of his life while attending school. Mockler had initially stopped making videos for several years after being kicked out of homecoming for cursing during a rap song, as he had decided to "get girls and do normal things", but he ultimately returned to videomaking once he started college. He uploaded his first political video to his current YouTube channel on May 16, 2023. To produce his first political videos, while still a college student, he cold-emailed videographers and attended a Donald Trump rally in Iowa.

Mockler developed an audience through his online political commentary and short-form videos. In February 2026, PBS's Firing Line with Margaret Hoover described him as an analyst of American politics as host of The Adam Mockler Show; by that time, his channel had more than 1.8 million subscribers. He was previously part of the MeidasTouch network. By May 2026, his YouTube channel reached approximately 2 million subscribers.

Mockler produces multiple breaking-news reaction videos daily. In June 2026, he launched an independent political debate show. He is also building a production company in Chicago, modeled on Anthony Bourdain and Charlie Kirk, as part of an effort to own his own media infrastructure. He has stated his goal as wanting "to have political and cultural sway by owning my own infrastructure."

== Television and public appearances ==
Mockler has appeared as a panelist on CNN's NewsNight with Abby Phillip. A CNN transcript of the April 30, 2026, episode listed him on a panel with Scott Jennings, Peter Meijer, Kat Abughazaleh, and Geraldo Rivera. During the episode, Mockler discussed U.S. policy toward Iran, the cost of the conflict, and broader political issues involving the Trump administration.

In February 2026, Mockler appeared on PBS's Firing Line with Margaret Hoover for a forum-style discussion about digital media and politics. The episode examined how younger political commentators build trust with audiences at a time of declining confidence in traditional media. He was a guest on Have I Got News For You US in October 2026.

He has also appeared on Kentucky Governor Andy Beshear's podcast and created video content with New York City Mayor Zohran Mamdani.

== Reception and media coverage ==
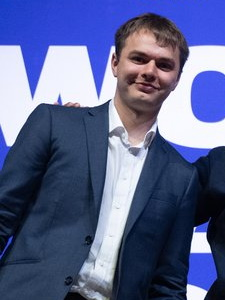
Mockler at the Won't Back Down! tour in Omaha, Nebraska in 2025

In 2026, Chicago magazine ranked Mockler 45th on its list of "The 50 Most Powerful Chicagoans". The magazine wrote that political media was increasingly shaped by YouTubers and podcasters, and stated that Mockler could play a role in shaping perceptions of Democratic presidential hopefuls in the 2028 election cycle.

Mockler's exchanges on CNN have attracted coverage from media and entertainment outlets. In May 2026, Mediaite, The Daily Beast, and TV Insider reported on a heated NewsNight exchange between Mockler and CNN commentator Scott Jennings during a discussion of U.S. policy toward Iran.

== Political views ==
Mockler is among a rising group of younger anti-Trump political commentators who have built large audiences on social media during Donald Trump's second term. He advocates a "muscular liberalism" focused on protecting human dignity and social harmony, aiming to reclaim the term from both right-wing critics and far-left interpretations. He has criticized the Democratic Party as "very risk-averse and very finger-waggy," calling it "rather suffocating" for the past decade. Mockler has attributed part of his appeal to his calm, even-keeled demeanor, stating that he benefits "a lot from being a chill guy" and expressing hope that this tone contributes to a broader shift in Democratic communication.

Looking toward the 2028 presidential election, Mockler has expressed confidence that he will interview many candidates and help shape public opinion on them. He has said, "I am rather confident that I'll be talking to a lot of 2028 presidential candidates and using that to form people's opinions on them. I want to build the show and build my brand to a point where I'm the de facto young guy that these politicians go to." He also aims to build what he has described as the largest political debate show.

== Personal life ==
Mockler identifies as agnostic, having been raised by a Muslim father and Christian mother.

As of 2026, Mockler is dating liberal internet personality and content creator Eumie "Eumieverse" Michelle.

== See also ==
- Online journalism
