= Sarasota Military Academy =

Location
- Sarasota, Florida; United States
- 27.3437°N 82.5388°W

Information
- Type: Charter
- Motto: SMA: More than a school. It's a way of life.
- Established: 2002 (24 years ago)
- School district: Sarasota County Public Schools
- NCES School ID: 120168003933
- Executive Director of Schools: Christina Bowman
- Faculty: 95.00 (on FTE basis)
- Grades: 6–12
- Enrollment: 1,355 (2019–20)
- Student to teacher ratio: 14.26
- Colors: Blue and gold
- Mascot: Eagles
- Nickname: SMA and SMA Prep
- Website: sarasotamilitaryacademy.org

Sarasota Military Academy (SMA) is a military academy charter school founded in 2002 in Sarasota, Florida. The academy consists of a middle school and a high school. The school's athletic teams compete as the Eagles. Other extracurricular activities include JROTC programs and a drum line squad.

== Notable alumni ==
- Mary Tucker, American Olympic sports shooter, world champion in 10 meter air rifle
