= Community service =

Unpaid work to benefit a community

Community service is unpaid work performed by a person or group of people for the benefit and betterment of their community. In many cases, people doing community service are compensated in other ways, such as receiving a free lunch. In many countries, there are programs to encourage people to do community service. In some cases, it is possible to replace a criminal justice sanctions with community service; there may also be school or class requirements. Obtaining certain benefits may be linked to doing some form of community service. For all these reasons, it is distinct from volunteering.

== Background ==
Community service is a non-paying job performed by one person or a group of people for the benefit of their community or its institutions. Community service is distinct from volunteering, since it is not always performed on a voluntary basis and may be performed for a variety of reasons, including:

- Required by a government as a part of citizenship requirements, like the mandatory "Hand and hitch-up services" for some municipalities in Austria and Germany, or generally in lieu of military service (see: Zivildienst and Alternative civilian service) or for civil conscription services.
- Required as a substitution of, or in addition to, other criminal justice sanctions – when performed for this reason it may also be referred to as community payback or compensatory service.
- Mandated by schools to meet the requirements of a class, such as in the case of service-learning or to meet the requirements of graduating as class valedictorian.
- As an workfare obligation, as condition of the receipt of social and financial benefits, see Workfare in the United Kingdom
- In Sweden, it is a suspended sentence called "samhällstjänst" ("society service").

=== Educational community service ===
==== Secondary education ====
Some educational jurisdictions in the United States require students to perform community service hours to graduate from high school. In some high schools in Washington, for example, students must finish 200 hours of community service to get a diploma. Some school districts in Washington, including Seattle Public Schools, differentiate between community service and "service learning", requiring students to demonstrate that their work has contributed to their education. If a student in high school is taking an Advancement Via Individual Determination (AVID) course, community service is often needed. Whether American public schools could require volunteer hours for high school graduation was challenged in Immediato v. Rye Neck School District, but the court found no violation.

Many other high schools do not require community service hours for graduation, but still see an impressive number of students get involved in their communities. For example, in Palo Alto, California, students at Palo Alto High School log about 45,000 hours of community service every year. As a result, the school's College and Career Center awards 250–300 students the President's Volunteer Service Award every year for their hard work.

Starting in 2010, Danish high school students receive a special diploma if they complete at least 20 hours of voluntary work.

The International Baccalaureate program formerly required 50 hours of community service, together with a written reflection on the service performed, to fulfill the requirement of 150 hours of CAS (creativity, action, and service) and receive an IB diploma.

==== Higher education ====
Though not technically considered a requirement, many colleges include community service as an unofficial requirement for acceptance. However, some colleges prefer work experience over community service, and some require that their students also continue community service for some specific number of hours to graduate. Some schools also offer unique "community service" courses, awarding credit to students who complete a certain number of community service hours. Some academic honor societies, along with some fraternities and sororities in North America, require community service to join and others require each member to continue doing community service.

Many student organizations exist for the purpose of community service, the largest of which is Alpha Phi Omega. Community service projects are also done by sororities and fraternities.

Beginning in the 1980s, colleges began using service-learning as a pedagogy. A partnership of college presidents began in 1985 with the initiative of boosting community service in their colleges. This alliance called Campus Compact, led the way for many other schools to adopt service-learning courses and activities.

Service-learning courses vary widely in time span, quality, and in the balance of "service" and "learning" stressed in the course. A typical service-learning course, however, has these factors in common:

- A service component where the student spends time serving in the community meeting actual needs
- A learning component where students seek out or are taught information—often both interpersonal and academic—that they integrate into their service
- A reflection component that ties service and learning together

Reflection is sometimes symbolized by the hyphen in the term "service-learning" to indicate that it has a central role in learning by serving. Reflection is simply a scheduled consideration of one's own experiences and thoughts. This can take many forms, including journals, blogs, and discussions.

Service-learning courses present learning the material in context, meaning that students often learn effectively and tend to apply what was learned. As the book Where's the Learning in Service-Learning? notes, "Students engaged in service-learning are engaged in authentic situations; they get to know real people whose lives are affected by these issues... As a result, they have lots of questions—real questions that they want to have answered." Thus, students become interested and motivated to learn the materials to resolve their questions.

Community service learning strives to connect or re-connect students with serving their community after they finish their course. It creates a bridge for the lack of community service found among college-age people in the United States.

==== Community service-learning ====
The one serving may take something away from the experience and be able to apply newfound knowledge or interpersonal discoveries to future servitude.

Community service-learning is "about leadership development as well as traditional information and skill acquisition". Therefore, the combination of people doing service and learning at the same time teaches them how to be effective and how to be effective regarding what is important to them. It can improve their overall experience and application opportunities they gain from it. By adding service to learning, and balancing the two, community service can become more than just the act of serving. The goal of service-learning is to achieve large change through small actions. By being a classroom, a hands-on learning experience, and an opportunity to change the community, people are able to not only serve, but impact themselves as well.

===== Definition =====
According to Fayetteville State University, "service learning is a process of involving students in community service activities combined with facilitated means for applying the experience to their academic and personal development. It is a form of experiential education aimed at enhancing and enriching student learning in course material. When compared to other forms of experiential learning like internships and cooperative education, it is similar in that it is student-centered, hands-on and directly applicable to the curriculum."

Professor Freddy Cardoza defines community service-learning as "a pedagogy (or a specific teaching-learning approach) that has few lectures, and is a more interactive hands on educational strategy which provides students with instruction while leading them through meaningful community service experiences and engaging them in personal reflection on those experiences in order to build character and to teach problem-solving skills and civic responsibility." Cardoza stressed that it was important for a student take some time and reflect on what they are experiencing, seeing, doing, and what problems they are encountering and how they are going to apply what they have been learning to solve these problems. In other words, service-learning aims to link the personal and interpersonal development with cognitive development, as well as equipping the student with critical knowledge to help them understand the world.

Character.org defines service-learning as "different than community service in several key ways. Service learning includes student leadership, reflective and academic components, and chances for celebration once the service activity has been successfully completed. Students reflect on community needs, ways to help, and once their service has been completed, they can internalise how their efforts have helped, while learning more about academics such as geography, math, or science."

==== Critical service learning ====
For community service to be effective, a different sector of community service learning; critical service, emerged in colleges throughout nations. The emergence of critical service learning in colleges had to do with solving the question of how students can create longstanding, effective change in the services they do for their communities. Critical service learning is centered around teaching and learning methods that focus on the transformation of power and deconstructions of systemic inequalities through community engagement by students. According to Mitchell, there are three different approaches required to achieve a critical learning service status. These are: redistributing power to marginalized groups of people; developing meaningful partnerships with community members/partners and those in the classroom; and, approaching service learning through the lens of making impactful social change. The ultimate goal of this sector is to connect students' services to their learning discourses. Students then ask themselves how their services create political and social change in these communities. Meeting individual needs in relation to poverty is not the main focus for critical service learning. Instead it is to address how students can become agents of social change and dismantle the institutions that allow for inequalities to exist in the communities they serve in the first place.

===== Background of critical service learning =====
Critical service learning emerged through the ideologies of Dewey in 1902. His main goal was reconnecting education and communities. He argued that it was essential that students took their learning discourses and used it to connect to their personal experiences. Doing this would allow for social development and the well-being of communities. Between World War 1 and World War 2 Kilpatrick, a progressive leader, introduced "the project method" to educational practices. He stressed the importance of introducing social reforms that focused on the livelihood of persons outside of the classrooms. Some attempts to create policy for critical service learning started in the 50s and continued through the 60s. In the 50s, The Citizenship Education Project set precedents to understanding the frameworks between learning in the classrooms and action in the communities. This precedent led to many more political reform efforts to incorporate critical service learning into education in the 70s. Many educational institutions introduced political proposals that focused on the integration of learning and civic engagement with communities. Reform documents were not made until the 80s but Reagan and his era had already moved past progressivism and towards neoliberalism. Since reforms in the past 100 years haven't seemed to work, educational leaders and schools have made critical service learning into more grassroots type movements. By not focusing on state reforms, critical service learning has now become a methodology in University programs and other local organizations. Community and Critical service brings an opportunity of change for students and for the communities they serve.

=== Court-ordered service ===
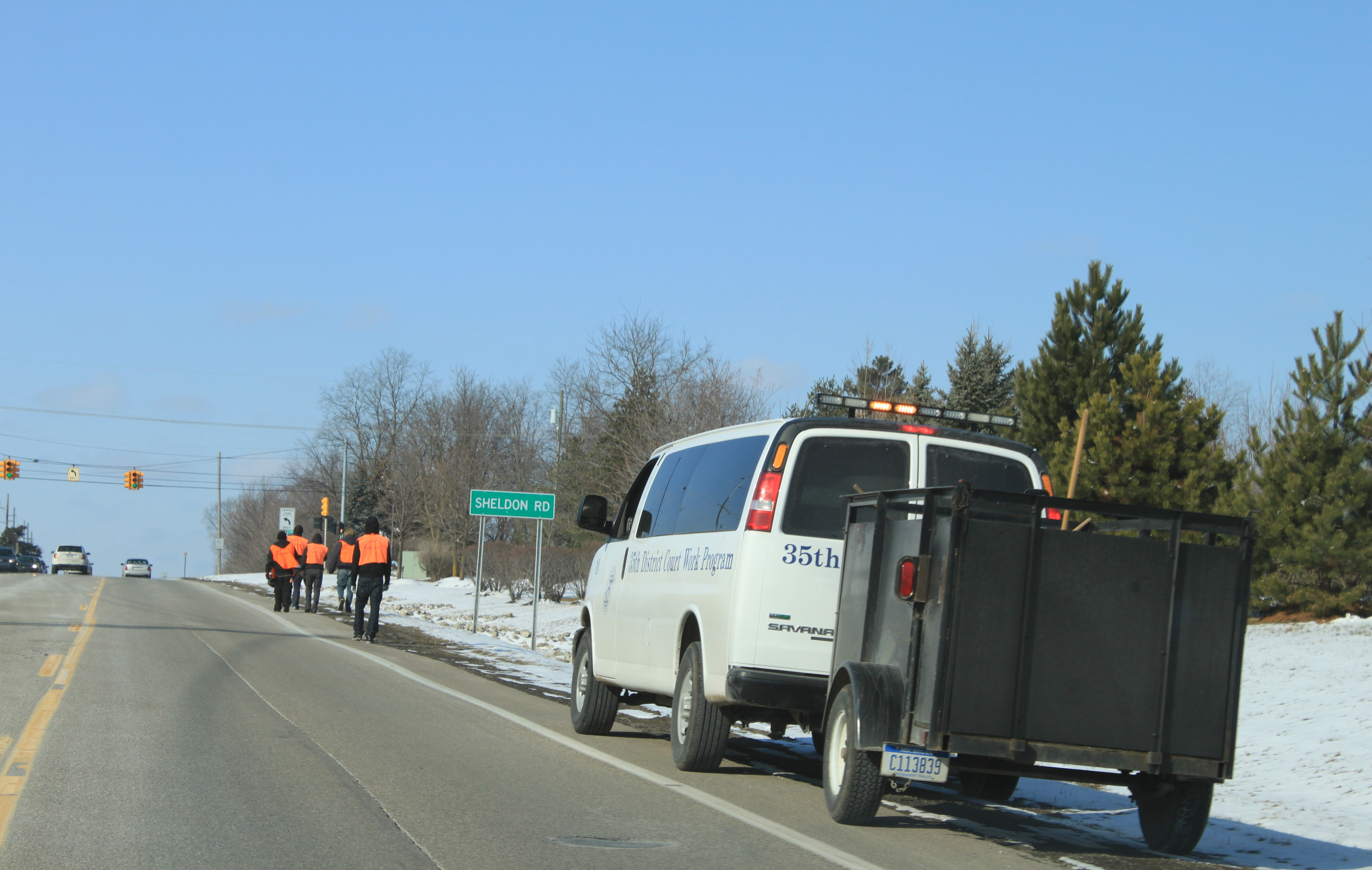
Community service work detail for 35th District Court, Northville, Michigan

People convicted of a crime may be required to perform community service or to work for agencies in the sentencing jurisdiction either entirely or partially as a substitution of other judicial remedies and sanctions, such as incarceration or fines. For instance, a fine may be reduced in exchange for a prescribed number of hours of community service. The court may allow the defendant to choose their community service, which must then be documented by "credible agencies", such as non-profit organizations, or may mandate a specific service.

Sometimes the sentencing is specifically targeted to the defendant's crime, for example, a litterer may have to clean a park or roadside, or a drunk driver might appear before school groups to explain why drunk driving is a crime. Also, a sentence allowing for a broader choice may prohibit certain services that the offender would reasonably be expected to perform anyway.

In the United Kingdom, community service is now officially referred to by the Home Office as more straightforward compulsory unpaid work. Compulsory unpaid work includes up to 300 hours of activities, such as conservation work, cleaning up graffiti, or working with a charity. The Howard League for Penal Reform (the world's oldest prison reform organization) is a prominent advocate for increased community sentencing to reduce prison population and improve rehabilitation.

=== Community service for institutions ===
Many institutions require and/or give incentives to students or employees alike to volunteer their time to community service programs. From volunteering to participating in such charity events like walks or runs, institutes continue the practice or require their employees or students to grow in camaraderie while giving back to various communities. Many institutions also provide opportunities for employees and students to work together, and most student groups participate in their own form of community service. Each is unique in its own right; all are incredibly popular with employees; and in all of these programs, human resources plays an integral role.

One such program, Johns Hopkins University, under the leadership of Johns Hopkins University president Ronald J. Daniels and the chief executive officer of Baltimore City Schools, the university's human resources and community affairs departments worked with the school system to develop the Johns Hopkins Takes Time for Schools program in 2009, launching it on March 3, 2010. The program is a service partnership aimed at providing support and assistance to Baltimore City Schools (BCS) while providing faculty and staff an avenue for community service, offering their talents to the city's youth and improving the administrative and educational capacities of the area's school system.

Some institutes even give their students or employees a guaranteed number of days or weeks of leave for certain acceptable community service programs. One example is East Carolina University, which gives 24 hours of community service leave for full-time employees per year as an incentive and compensation for community service.

In addition, approximately 40% of Fortune 500 companies offer volunteer grant programs where companies provide monetary donations to nonprofit organizations in recognition of their employee's volunteerism (e.g. $500 volunteer grant after 25 hours of community service).

=== Religious reasons for serving ===
Religion is one of the greatest motivating forces behind community service. "Although beneficence and good works are also important secular goals, religion remains one of the major motivating forces behind community service." All the major religious groups emphasize values of charity, compassion, and community.

Beyond required community service, some religious groups emphasize serving one's community. These groups and churches reach out by holding Vacation Bible Schools for children, hosting Red Cross blood drives, having fall carnivals, or offering free meals. Through these services, churches are able to benefit neighborhoods and families. Some churches create non-profit organizations that can help the public. Crisis pregnancy centers are often run by religious groups to promote pro-life values in local families. To meet impoverished people's needs, some churches provide a food pantry or start a homeless shelter. Also, certain churches provide daycare so that busy parents can work.

== Personal benefits of serving ==
Community service also allows those participating to reflect on the difference they are making in society. Some participants of a community service project may find themselves gaining a greater understanding of their roles in the community, as well as the impact of their contributions towards those in need of service. Because community service outlets vary, those who serve are exposed to many different kinds of people, environments, and situations.

A benefit of participating in community service is to gain greater experience and benefits to help individuals gain advantages for their careers. According to "The Give and Take of Volunteering: Motives, Benefits, and Personal Connections among Irish Volunteers", " Career benefits took different forms depending on the person's career stage and on the type of work involved"(McKeena). At the beginning of a profession, volunteering could be beneficial, giving people at a more practical level of hands-on experience in health and social care, while persons at a more advanced level of their careers achieved career-related benefits from high-level relationships for job-related reasons (Mckenna).

With each new community service project, some participants may gain insightful experience in a variety of areas. Participants may also internalize the information that they found personally insightful for future use. While simply performing community service is valuable to the recipients, those serving often find it beneficial to pause and reflect on how they are changing society for the better. Schools often take students on community service projects so they can learn how their individual actions affect the well-being of the public. Participants may find that serving the public fosters a more solidified view of self and purpose.

Those involved in community service learning may also find that after serving the community for an extended period of time, they have an advantage in real-world experience. Eventually, the skills and knowledge obtained while working with the community may be applied in future areas of work. Community service may also increase a participant's social connectivity. Because most community service opportunities allow others to interact and work with other individuals, this service may help volunteers network and connect with others toward a common goal.

Another benefit in participating in community service is a greater understanding and appreciation for diversity. Appreciating other cultures and breaking down stereotypes is important to becoming a responsible citizen and better person. By participating in a community service project where interaction is required, personal relationships can begin to grow. These personal relationships help people have informal and consistent interactions that through time, often break down negative stereotypes.

These relationships can also facilitate more opinions and viewpoints surrounding various topics that help participants to grow in diversity. Stereotypes can be defined as, "believing unfairly that all people or things with a specific characteristic are the same." Stereotypes often reveal themselves in quick judgments based solely off of visible characteristics. These judgments move into a biased opinion when you believe that these judgments are always true. These stereotypes can be harmful to both personal relationships and relationships within the workplace. Community service helps people to realize that everyone does not fall into these preconceived ideas.

Along with breaking down stereotypes, community service work can assist people in realizing that those they are helping and working with are no different from themselves. This realization can lead to empathizing with others. Learning to understand the needs and motivations of others, especially those who live different lives from our own, is an important part of living a productive life. This leads to a view of humanity that can help a person stay free of biased opinions of others and can lead to a more diverse and ultimately more productive and thought-provoking life.

Volunteer work that's relevant to the job position can be added as work experience in resume. According to U.S. News & World Report, volunteer work that is relevant to the job may be listed under the professional or work experience sections of a resume." This depends on working term as a volunteer. If the term were more than 2 years, it's not worthwhile to list community service as work experience.

== Strategies ==
Civilians have a desire and aptitude to organize themselves apart from the government to address the needs in their communities. However, making sure an effort has a positive effect on society requires clear analysis and a strategy. The analysis identifies the root causes of problems that project implementation must address. Individuals, like neighborhoods, enjoy permanent change only if it is an inner one—and the greatest form of community service is encouraging that inner change.

Abraham Kuyper advocated for sphere sovereignty, which honors the independence and autonomy of the "intermediate bodies" in society, such as schools, press, business, and the arts. He championed the right of every community to operate its own organizations and manage its own groups, with the foundational belief that parents know what their child really needs, and that local people are more capable of helping other locals. Those who agree with his views perceive community service as a tool of empowerment that can help people achieve better employment and lifestyle, avoiding what they see as destructive decision-making for mal-established goals by poorly developed community service efforts.

Amy L. Sherman, in her book Restorers of Hope, suggests that community service planning should be made with the valuable opinion of the local residents, since they have firsthand knowledge of the inside realities of their community's current state. Making them a part of the movement, change or project creates in the members of the community a sense of belonging and hope.

A joint study suggests that a more effective approach to community service focuses on increased participation of local people in decision-making and collaborative partnerships. The goal is "a bottom-up approach in which participants become agents of change and decision making." This is accomplished through several principles: inclusion, equal partnership, transparency, sharing power, sharing responsibility, empowerment, and cooperation. Being cognizant of who is given a voice in defining the need for community service, and the ways in which these issues are approached, is one of the first steps in recognizing spaces in which participation can be increased.
