= Surrounded (web series) =

American political debate YouTube series

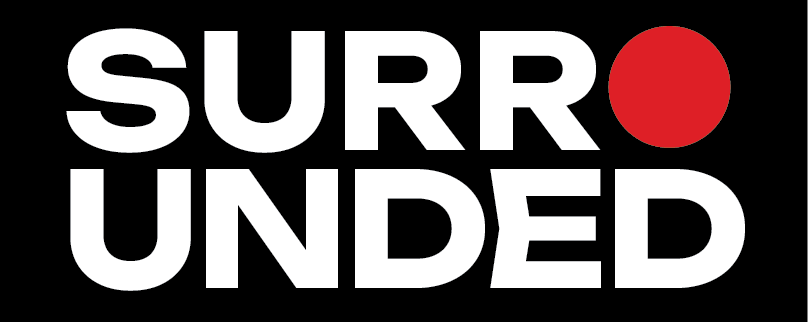
- Wordmark
- Country of origin: United States
- Original language: English
- No. of episodes: 51

Production
- Running time: 20–118 minutes
- Production company: Jubilee Media

Original release
- Network: YouTube
- Release: September 8, 2024 – present

Surrounded is an American web series hosted by political YouTube channel Jubilee, hosted by Jubilee Media. In the series, a prominent figure or individuals of specific beliefs are asked to debate against 20 to 25 opponents (for example, an anti-abortion activist versus abortion rights activists or an LGBT rights activist versus social conservatives).

== Premise ==
The series puts one notable figure against several people who disagree with them about various topics (usually political topics, though there have been episodes that focus on health, religious, or sports topics) and has the others take turns debating the notable figure after they make a claim about a topic. A person can be stopped from debating if a majority who agree with them raise a red flag or if the person's debate for that claim reaches a 20 to 25 minute time limit if the number of red flags needed to end a debate is not reached.

Participants do not know who they are going to debate with before the day of filming, and the featured person is asked to present several topics ahead of time. Moderators are rarely present in these debates, and when they are present, they tend to moderate only lightly.

== History ==
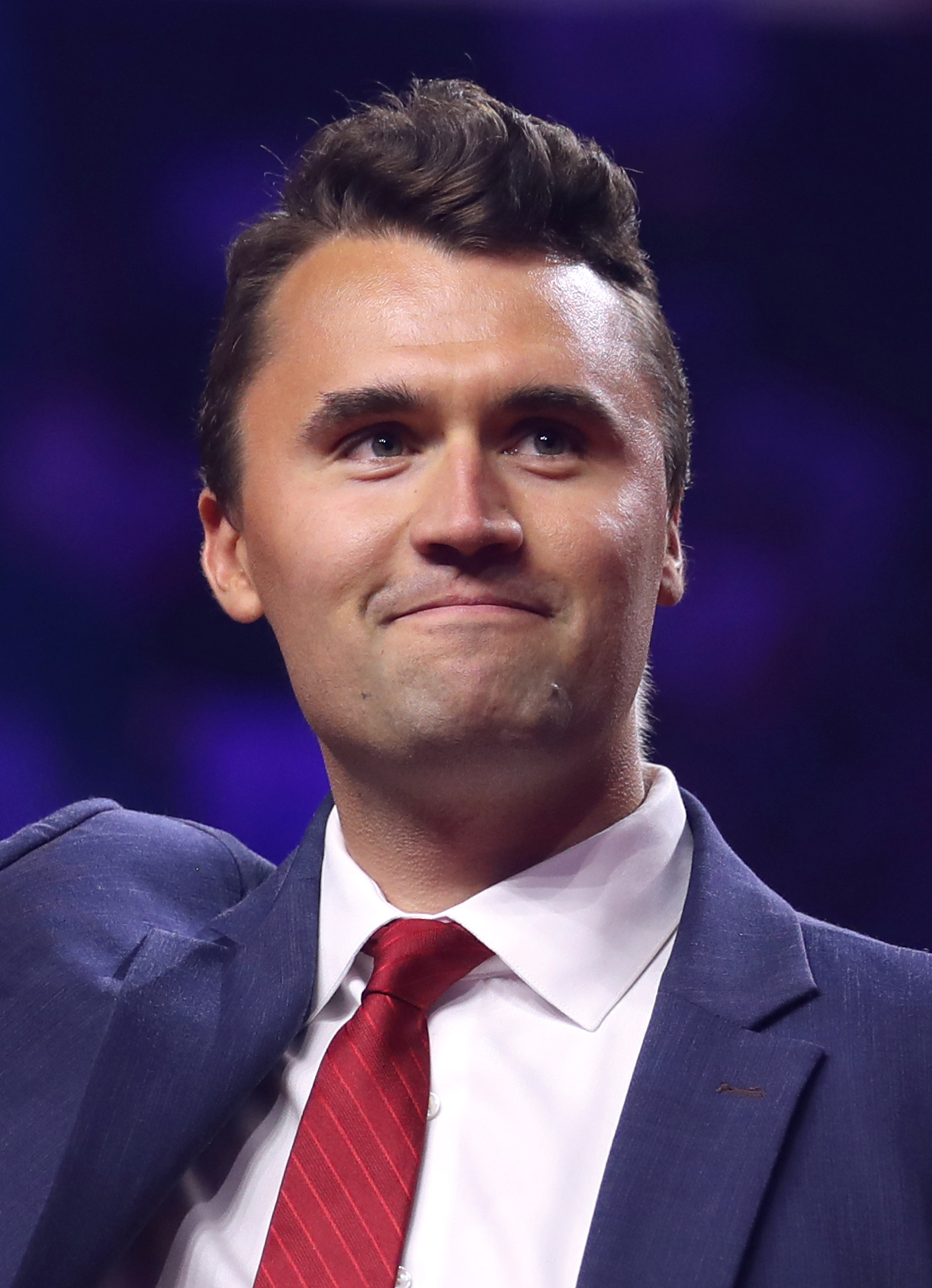
Charlie Kirk

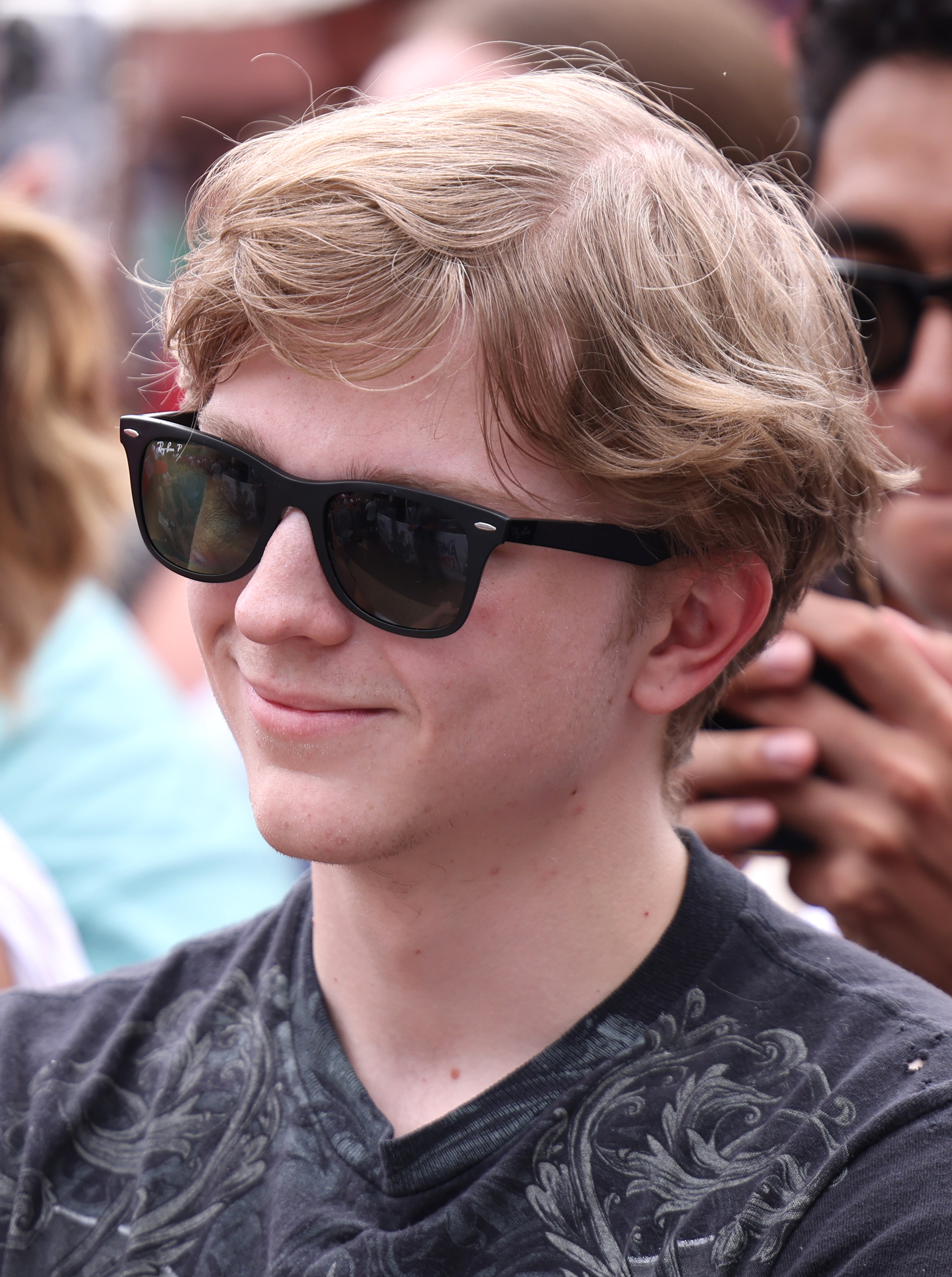
Dean Withers

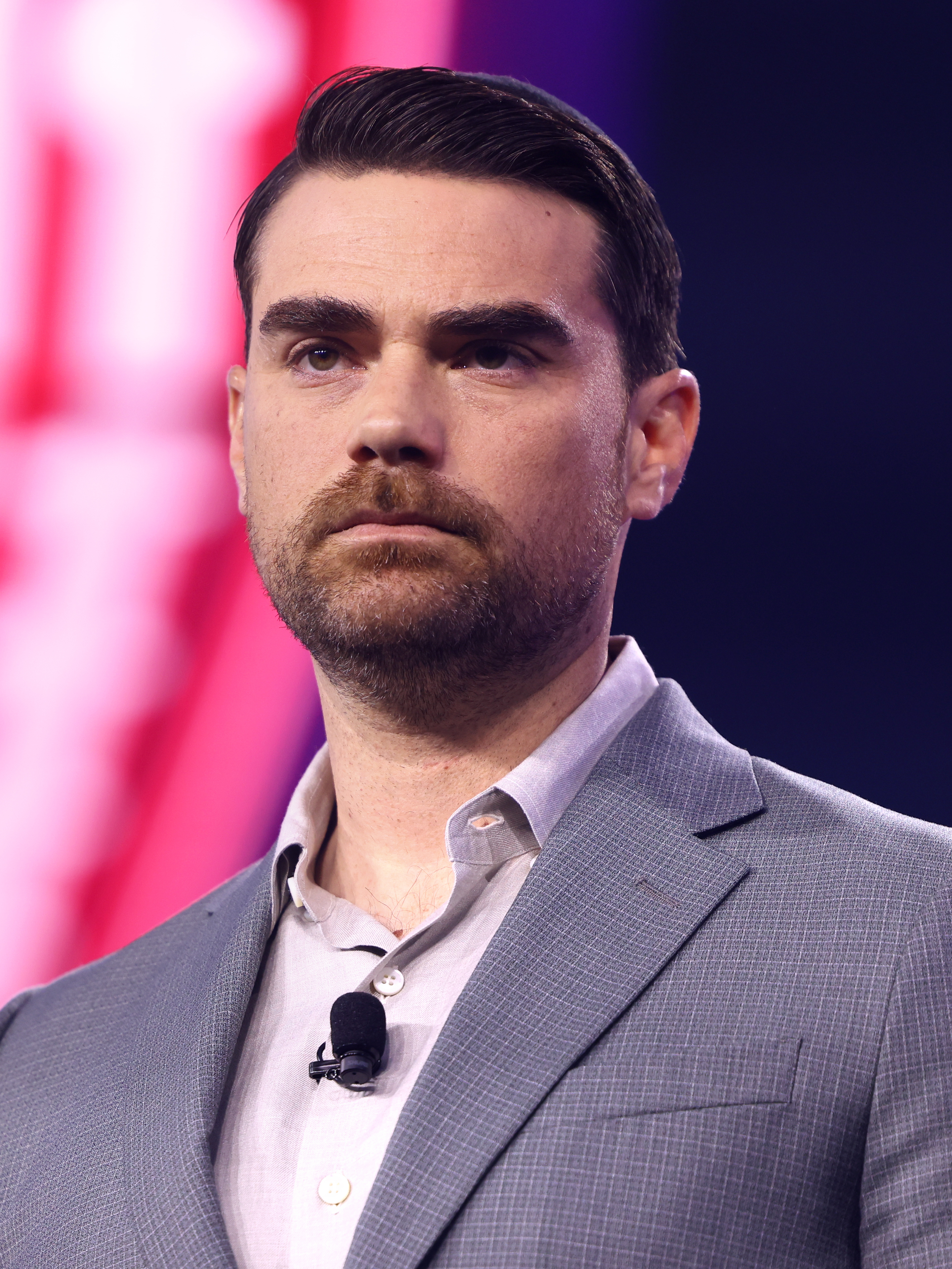
Ben Shapiro

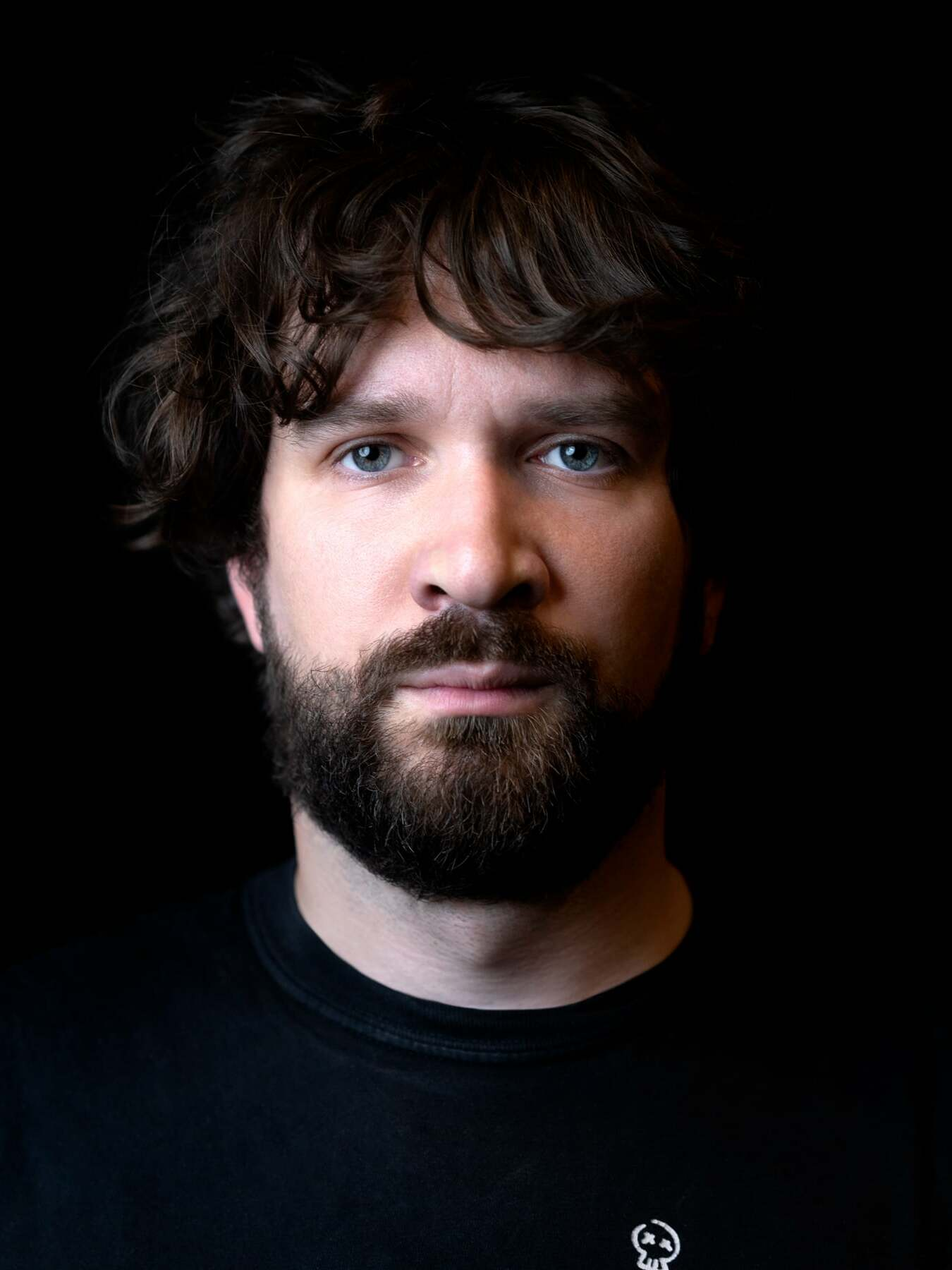
Destiny

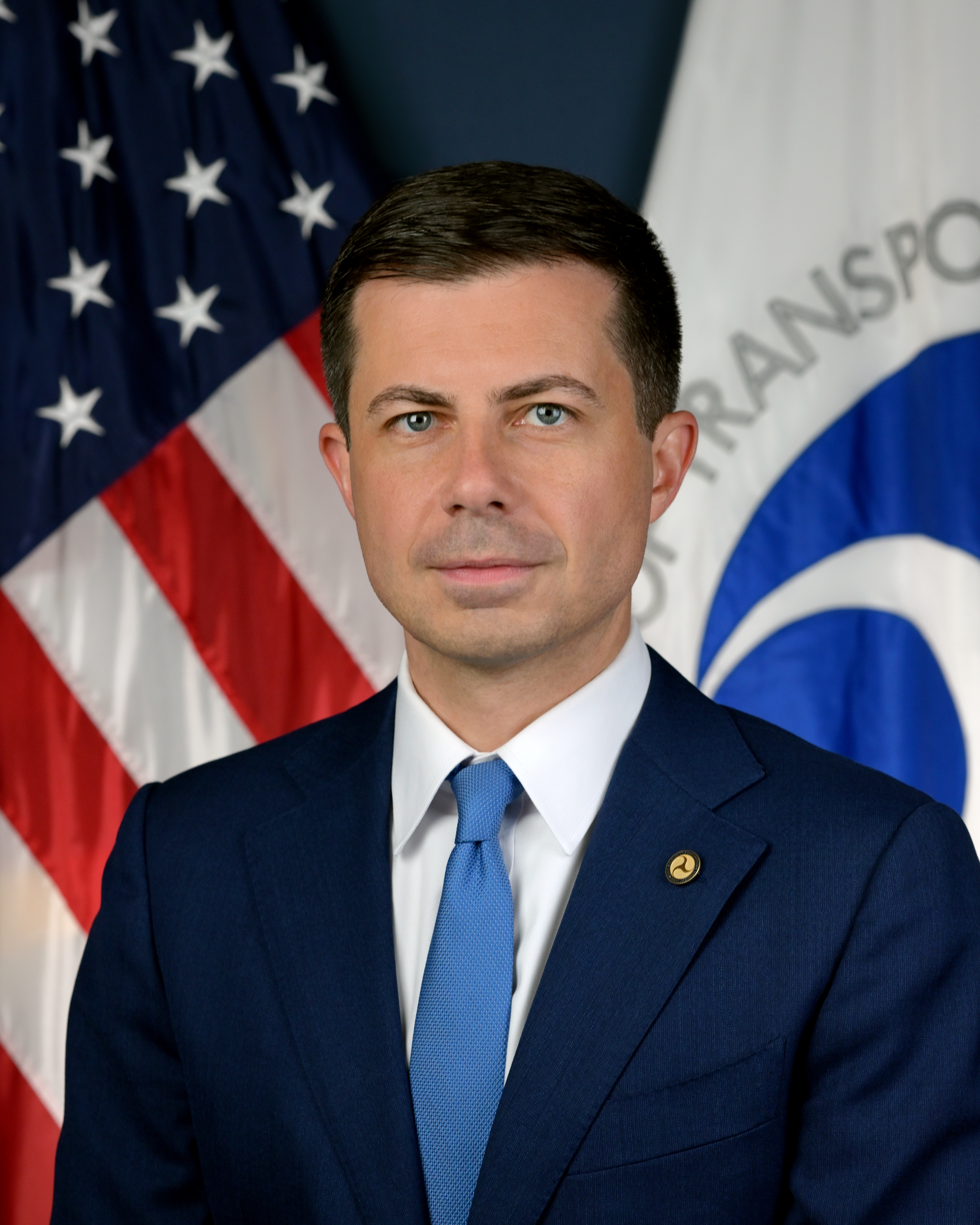
Pete Buttigieg

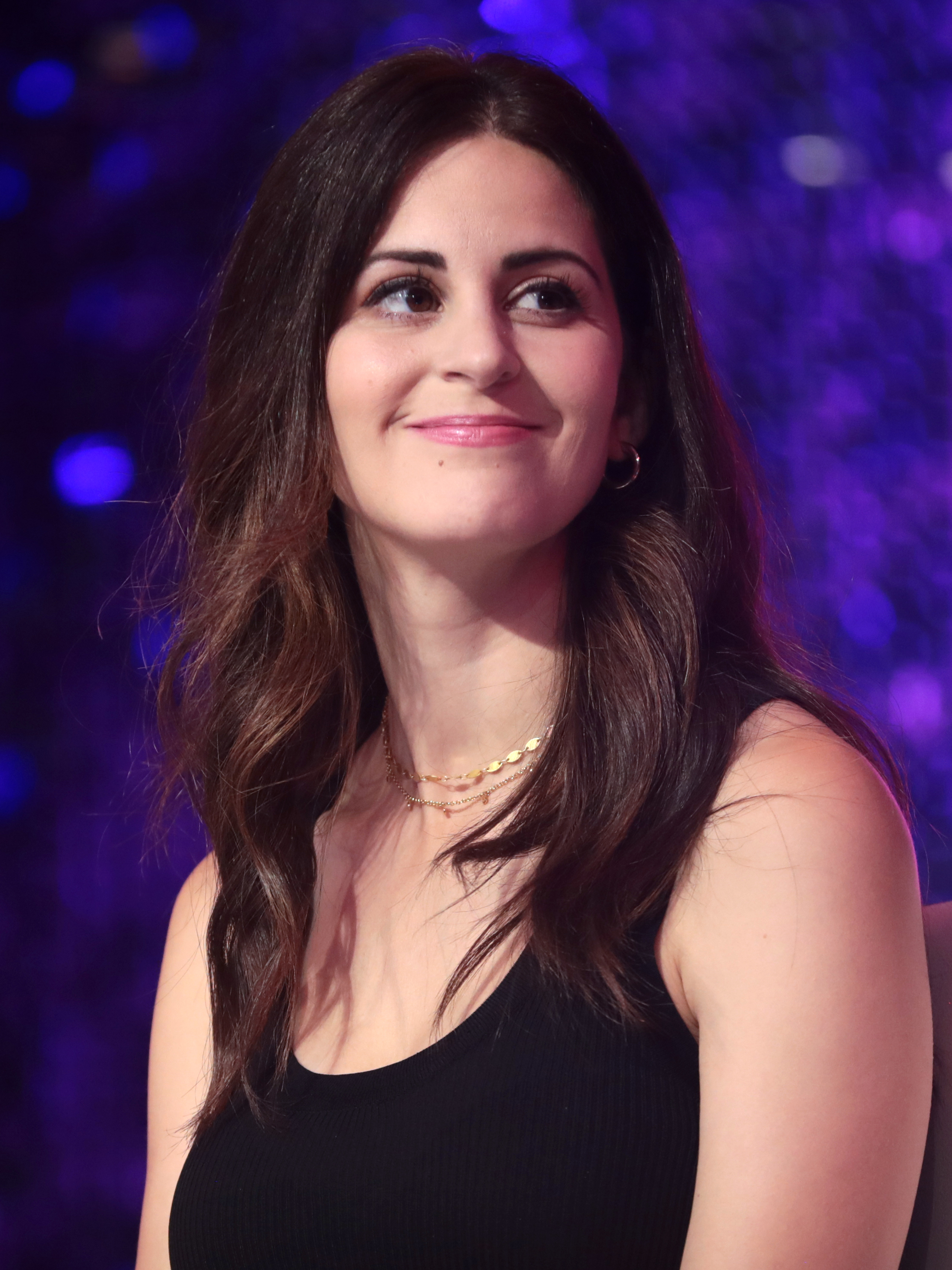
Lila Rose

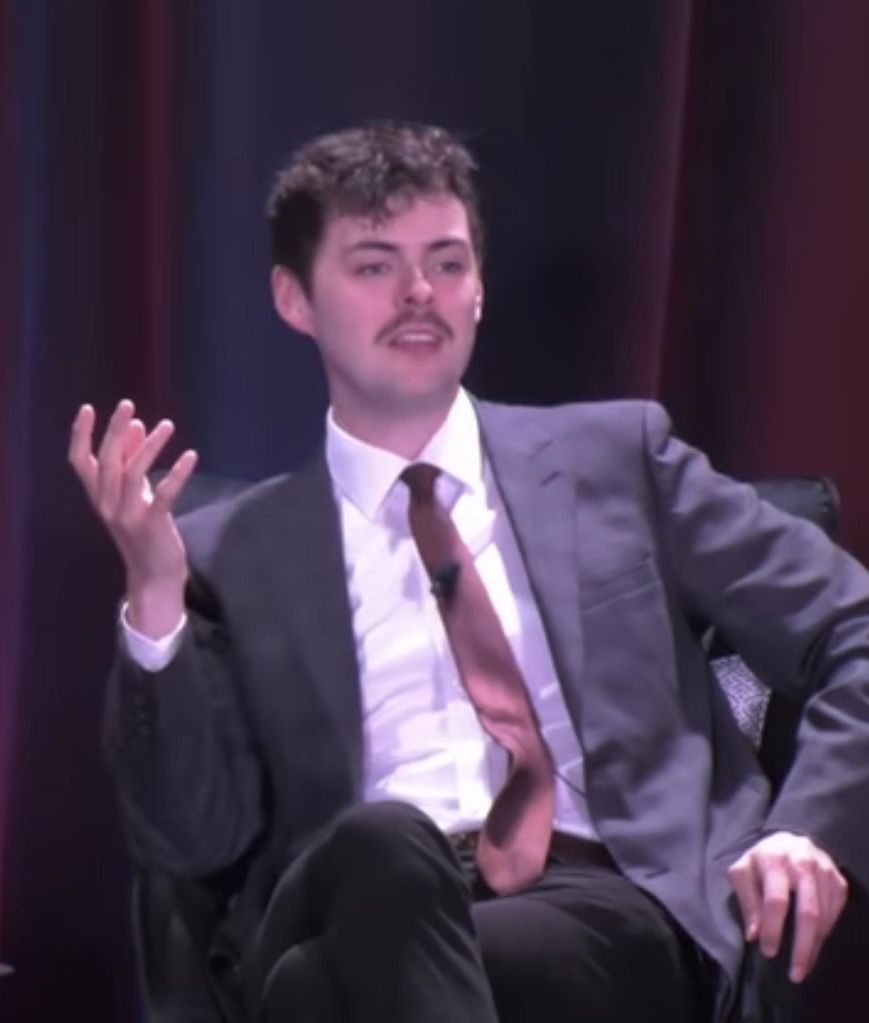
Alex O'Connor

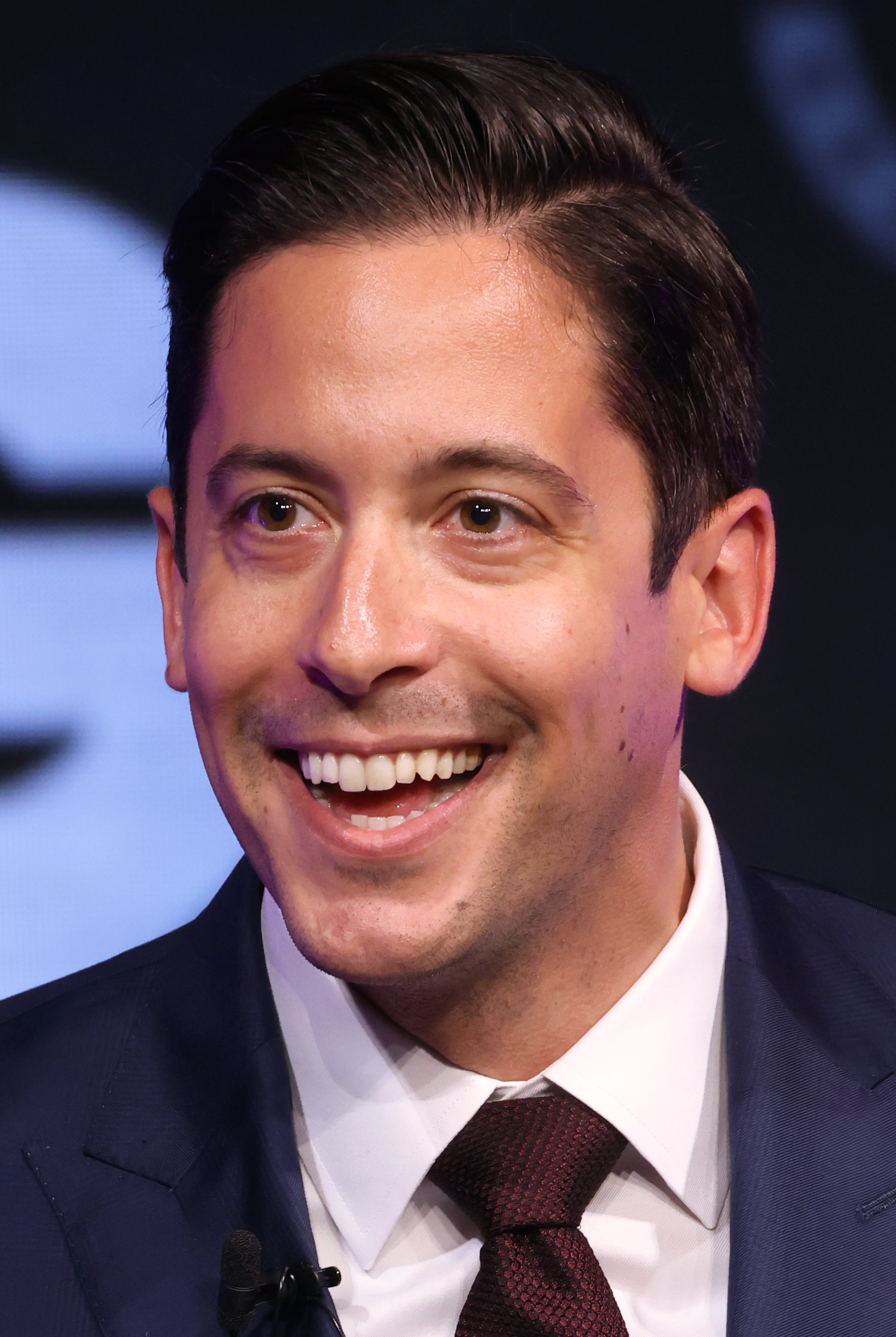
Michael Knowles

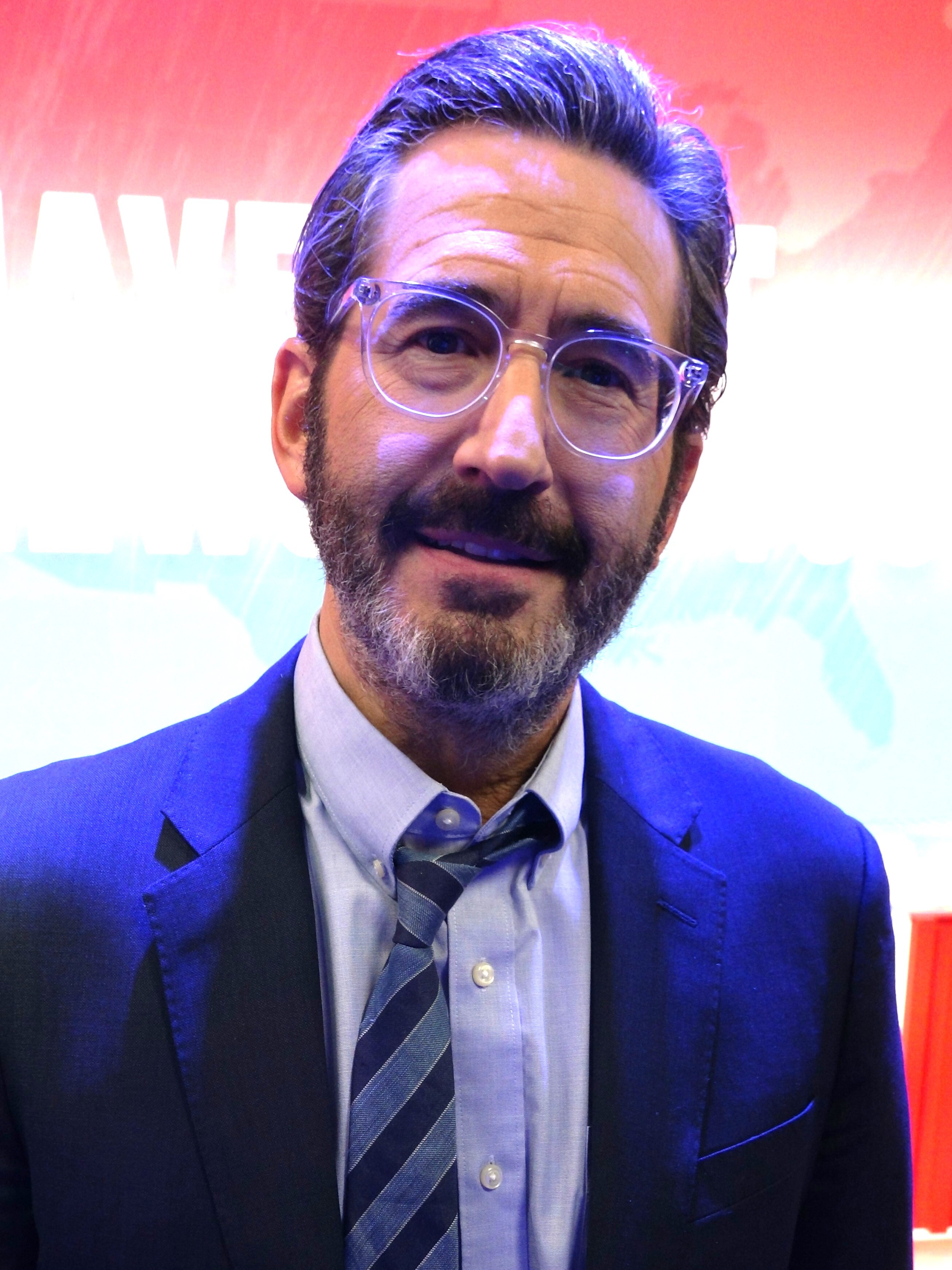
Sam Seder

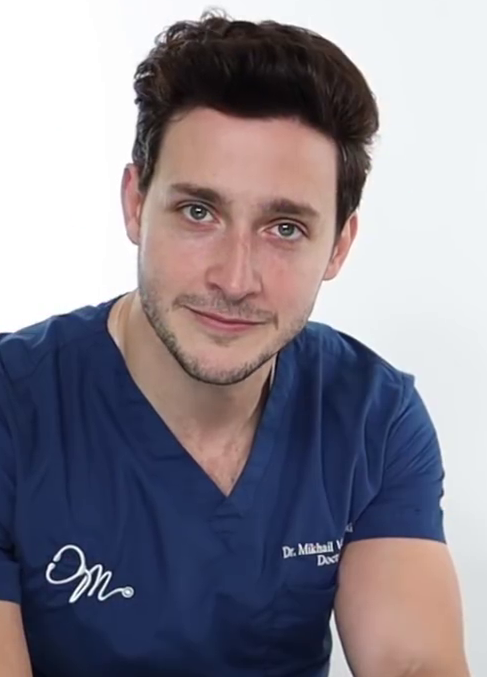
Doctor Mike

The first ten prominent figures or individuals of specific belief on the show

As political tensions increased in the United States, it became a popular practice to hold debates on the Internet, particularly among conservative pundits such as Ben Shapiro, Jordan Peterson, and Charlie Kirk, the latter's debates having been published on YouTube in the past on accounts such as the one run by Turning Point USA. Progressive commentators such as Destiny and Hasan Piker had done this for some time as well. Jubilee Media was founded with the stated intention of finding common ground between debaters, and published various videos in which people were put in situations where they were in the same room with someone they disagreed with, including video in which a scientist debates several flat Earthers, and a vegan debates several meat-eaters, and the Surrounded series. According to founder Jason Y. Lee, Jubilee Media was intended as a media empire teaching people how to connect and disagree. The focus of Surrounded was to center the debate of "the many versus the mighty".

The first video published in the series was one in which Charlie Kirk debated twenty five college students. Later that month, their video, "Can 1 Woke Teen Survive 20 Trump Supporters?" went viral, in which Dean Withers was pit against twenty individuals who supported Trump after having been in Kirk's episode. Withers, who had been in other Jubilee videos prior, argued regarding various political topics such as reproductive rights, including abortion and IUDs, and Kamala Harris' merits as a presidential candidate. Withers was invited to the White House following the release of the episode.

A later episode titled "1 Republican vs. 25 Kamala Harris Voters" featured Ben Shapiro, who debated topics such as DEI initiatives, the Gaza war, benefits for asylum seekers, Trump's apparent non-committal to a peaceful transfer of power, and the January 6 United States Capitol attack. In the episode, Shapiro is confronted by a transgender man named Shane who asks about his views on transgender rights and abortion. Shane explained his history as a transgender man, and Shapiro refused to acknowledge his gender. According to PinkNews, Shapiro became flustered at Shane's question about why he should not live American freedoms as a man, adding that he was using Shapiro's own tactics against him. After four and a half minutes, Shane was voted out of the debate and refused to shake Shapiro's hand. Footage of this portion of the episode gained popularity on TikTok and X, where people voiced agreement with Shane, including civil rights attorney and transgender rights activist Alejandra Caraballo. At the end of filming, Shapiro referred to the process as "fun" and complimented some of the people he debated. This episode was the fifth-most watched YouTube video related to the 2024 United States presidential election, getting 5.1 million views.

Other videos were published featuring similar debates, including one which is a police officer debates several criminals. Vulture described the website as "the studio's most head-turning effort for politically explosive bookings," as they had gotten political commentators such as Shapiro, Michael Knowles, and Lila Rose. At one point, Jubilee Media talked to both Trump's and Harris' presidential campaigns to have them on Surrounded, but neither ended up being on the show.

Former United States Secretary of Transportation Pete Buttigieg was featured in an episode in which he debated undecided voters, urging his debaters to vote for Harris as opposed to Trump. He answered various questions from his debaters in an attempt to demonstrate that Harris was the best option for President of the United States. Buttigieg was able to convince some of his debaters to vote.

One episode featured Alex O'Connor, an atheist, debating twenty-five Christians. The Atlantic described a tense mood at the beginning as the Christians would rush up to debate O'Connor, although debates were largely technical and focused on interpretations of various Bible verses. Episode director Suncè Franičević attempted to create more heated debates by encouraging the participants to share personal stories. After filming, O'Connor and the others went to a pub and had what O'Connor referred to as "a wonderful conversation", which O'Connor suggested was evidence that Surrounded was successfully teaching people to be better thinkers and speakers.

In another episode, "20 Trump Supporters Take on 1 Progressive", Sam Seder debated various conservatives on issues such as social security, gender-affirming care for minors, and the wealth gap. Seder said that his goal was to correct misinformation and have more policy-oriented conversations than he had seen in the past. In the video, Seder debates people who express a lack of belief in science and in a pluralistic society. Throughout the video, claims made were fact checked. One debater stated a belief in an establishment of Christian nationalism as an alternate to the "liberal world order", and another claimed that xenophobic nationalism is better for Americans. Another claimed that government agencies received tax breaks for hiring diverse employees. The video became popular and the subject of many Internet memes. Seder was later interviewed on the experience, where he said that when dealing with people who acknowledged being theocratic and white nationalist, he would simply "let them espouse their agenda and allow the audience to decide if that's the vision of America that they want."

The series has been very popular, earning 50 million views on YouTube by November 2024. A later episode that went viral featured Jordan Peterson debating various atheists. The video was initially called "1 Christian vs 20 atheists" but was renamed to "Jordan Peterson vs 20 atheists" after Peterson did not answer a question about whether or not he was Christian.

The video "1 Progressive vs 20 Far-Right Conservatives (ft. Mehdi Hasan)" went viral and attracted significant controversy after several participants made several inflammatory and extreme statements towards Hasan, such as advocating for the white genocide conspiracy theory. One participant, a man named Connor Estelle, was later fired from his job for statements he made in the video where he proclaimed himself a fascist, voiced opposition to democracy and free speech, downplayed the Holocaust, advocated for a Catholic autocracy similar to Francoist Spain, and stated he did not care about being called a Nazi. The episode attracted backlash and debate over whether Jubilee held responsibility for platforming those with extreme views, and allegations that it was focusing more on creating rage-bait for engagement rather than fostering informed debate. The Guardian reported that one participant, Richard Black, organized two 2017 far-right protests in Berkeley, California.

== Episodes ==
As of November 17, 2026, Surrounded has a total of 50 episodes.

No.	Title	Featured Debater	Original release date
1	"1 Conservative vs 25 Liberal College Students"	Charlie Kirk	September 8, 2024
2	"1 Liberal Teen vs. 20 Trump Supporters"	Dean Withers	September 20, 2024
3	"1 Cop vs 20 Criminals"	Kevin Donaldson	October 6, 2024
4	"1 Republican vs. 25 Kamala Harris Voters"	Ben Shapiro	October 24, 2024
5	"1 Democrat vs 25 Trump Voters"	Destiny	October 31, 2024
6	"1 Politician vs 25 Undecided Voters"	Pete Buttigieg	November 3, 2024
7	"Can 1 Pro-Lifer Survive 25 Pro-Abortion Activists?"	Lila Rose	January 12, 2025
8	"1 Atheist vs 25 Christians"	Alex O'Connor	January 26, 2025
9	"1 Conservative vs 25 LGBTQ+ Activists"	Michael Knowles	February 16, 2025
10	"1 Progressive vs. 20 Trump Supporters"	Sam Seder	March 9, 2025
11	"Doctor Mike vs 20 Anti-Vaxxers"	Doctor Mike	March 30, 2025
12	"1 Sports Analyst vs 25 NBA/NFL Fans"	Skip Bayless	April 13, 2025
13	"1 LGBTQ+ Activist vs 25 Conservatives"	Zander Moricz	May 11, 2025
14	"Jordan Peterson vs 20 Atheists (Note: This episode was originally titled "1 Christian vs 20 atheists".)"	Jordan Peterson	May 25, 2025
15	"Debating Resistance: 20 Protesters vs 1 Palestinian"	Ahmed Fouad Alkhatib	June 8, 2025
16	"1 Conservative vs 20 Feminists"	Candace Owens	June 29, 2025
17	"1 Progressive vs 20 Far-Right Conservatives"	Mehdi Hasan	July 20, 2025
18	"1 Populist vs 20 Democrats & Republicans"	Cenk Uygur	August 3, 2025
19	"1 Black Radical vs 20 Black Conservatives"	Amanda Seales	August 17, 2025
20	"1 Capitalist vs 20 Anti-Capitalists"	Patrick Bet-David	August 31, 2025
21	"1 Journalist vs 20 Conspiracy Theorists"	Andrew Callaghan	September 28, 2025
22	"1 Conservative Christian vs 20 Liberal Christians"	Allie Beth Stuckey	October 12, 2025
23	"20 Boomer Trump Supporters vs 1 GenZ Liberal"	Luke Beasley	October 26, 2025
24	"Bryan Johnson vs 20 Skeptics"	Bryan Johnson	November 16, 2025
25	"Tim Miller vs 20 Gen Z Conservatives"	Tim Miller	November 26, 2025
26	"Piers Morgan vs 20 Woke Liberals"	Piers Morgan	November 30, 2025
27	"1 Doctor vs 20 RFK Jr. Supporters"	Doctor Mike	December 7, 2025
28	"1 Texas Democrat vs 25 Undecided Voters"	James Talarico	December 14, 2025
29	"1 Gen-Z Liberal vs 20 Gen-Z Conservatives"	Adam Mockler	January 4, 2026
30	"1 Ex-Mafia Boss vs 20 Cops"	Michael Franzese	January 18, 2026
31	"1 Democrat vs 20 MAGA Republicans"	Isaiah Martin	February 1, 2026
32	"Jillian Michaels vs The Body Positivity Movement"	Jillian Michaels	March 15, 2026
33	"1 Vegan vs 20 Meat Eaters"	Jack Symes	April 5, 2026
34	"1 Congressman vs 20 Epstein File Critics"	Ro Khanna	April 12, 2026
35	"1 Israeli vs 20 Pro-Palestine Activists"	Rudy Rochman	April 26, 2026
36	"1 Psychiatrist & 20 Depressed People"	Alok Kanojia	May 10, 2026
37	"1 Journalist vs 20 Trump Supporters"	Glenn Greenwald	May 24, 2026
38	"Dave Rubin vs 20 Far-Left Democrats"	Dave Rubin	May 31, 2026
39	"Dean Withers vs 20 MAGA Women"	Dean Withers	June 21, 2026
40	"1 Politician vs 20 Americans Who Don't Vote"	Wes Moore	July 5, 2026
41	"1 Anti-Manosphere vs 20 Manosphere"	Mark Manson	July 19, 2026
42	"1 Black Conservative vs 20 Black Liberals"	Officer Tatum	August 2, 2026
43	"Tim Pool vs 20 Progressives (Note: This episode was originally titled "1 Moderate vs 20 Progressives".)"	Tim Pool	August 16, 2026
44	"1 Gen Z Politician vs 20 Boomers"	Maxwell Frost	August 30, 2026
45	"1 Conservative vs 20 Liberals"	Austin Julio Broughton	September 13, 2026
46	"Andrew Yang vs 20 AI Optimists"	Andrew Yang	September 27, 2026
47	"1 Liberal vs 20 MAGA"	David Mauricio	October 11, 2026
48	"1 OF Model vs 20 Anti-Sex Work Advocates"	Farha Khalidi	October 25, 2026
49	"1 Liberal Man vs 20 MAGA Conservatives"	Harry Sisson	November 1, 2026
50	"1 Millionaire Boss vs 20 Gen-Z Workers"	Kevin O'Leary	November 15, 2026
51	"1 Conservative Trans Woman vs 20 LGBTQ+ Activists"	Blaire White	November 22, 2026

== Reception ==
Vox described the series as a satire of what they believe Donald Trump had turned political discussions into, "extremely competitive, theatrical, and unbalanced." They described the series as a stunt, comparing it to videos by MrBeast. They criticized the series as rage bait and for using what they described as unchallenging prompts such as "trans women are women" and "Kamala Harris is a DEI candidate". However, they noted ingenuity in how it appeals to a wide audience by showcasing varied arguments.

Vulture was skeptical of the casting, particularly in the episode featuring Sam Seder, where they noted that the conservative debaters were all cast as a diverse group who were significantly younger than Seder, suggesting that Jubilee Media were trying to tell a story of youth and diversity within conservative movements.

The Daily Beast writer Michael Ian Black expressed disappointment with the claims made by conservative debaters in Seder's episode, suggesting that it was evidence that people who supported Donald Trump did not have ideologies grounded in reality. However, others viewed it more positively and spread videos online when they believed Ben Shapiro had lost a debate to a transgender man on the show.

In reflecting on his episode, Seder was asked if he believed it was dangerous to allow people who believed in theocracies and white nationalism to share such beliefs on a large platform. Seder simply responded that he did not care if those portions were spread as clips and if he was criticized for not being as rational as his opponents. He noted that his goal was successful based on the comments under Michael Knowles' response video to the episode being critical of Knowles. Despite this, he described the episode as "disturbing". He added in another interview that Surrounded's methods were better than those of Gavin Newsom, who he viewed as purposefully attempting to create division.

Research came to find that setups such as the one in Surrounded could in fact be more harmful than neutral. It said that such a style makes intense political debates appear more common than they are, whereas the average American tended to debate these topics "infrequently". Research showed that when one was asked to defend their political stance, it led to increased feelings of anxiety, which researcher Erica Bailey said was the reason for the popularity of Surrounded, as it allowed people to live vicariously through the debaters.
