= Rye Neck High School =

High school in Mamaroneck, New York

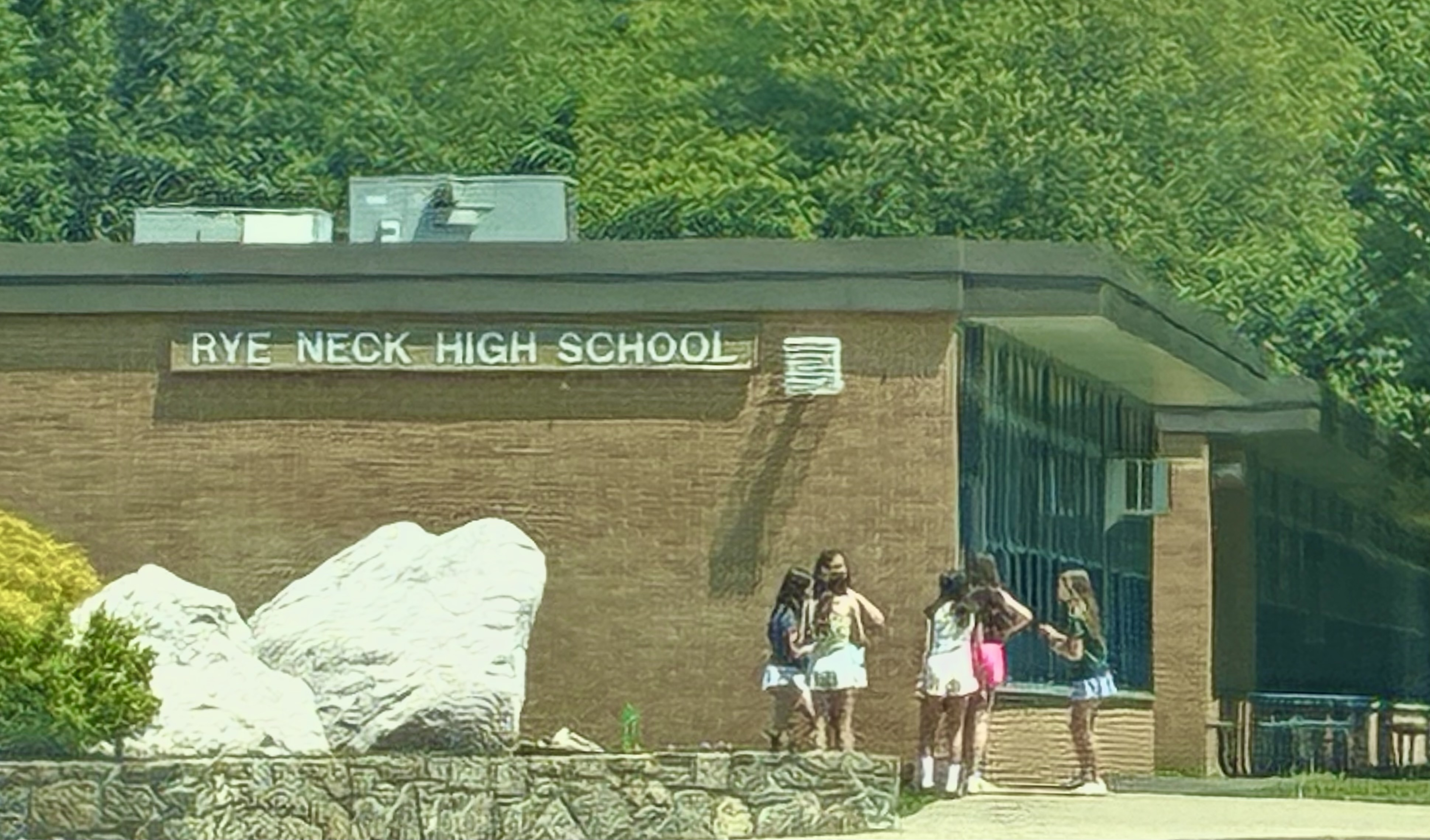

Location
- 300 Hornidge Road; Mamaroneck, (Westchester County), New York 10543; United States
- Coordinates: 40.958179°N 73.715612°W

Information
- School type: Public, high school
- Status: Open
- School district: Rye Neck Union Free School District
- NCES District ID: 3625290
- CEEB code: 333000
- NCES School ID: 362529003496
- Principal: Melinda Folchetti
- Faculty: 24.41 (on an FTE basis)
- Grades: 9 to 12
- Gender: Coeducational
- Enrollment: 506 (2021-22)
- Student to teacher ratio: 18.80
- Schedule: September to June
- Campus type: Suburban
- Colors: Black and Columbia blue
- Athletics conference: Section 1 (NYSPHSAA)
- Mascot: Panther
- Newspaper: Panther's Tale
- Yearbook: Scraps
- Feeder schools: Rye Neck Middle School
- Magnet school: No
- Charter school: No
- Website: rnhs.ryeneck.org

Rye Neck High School is an American public secondary school located in the village of Mamaroneck, New York, and the town of Rye, New York. It is part of the Rye Neck Union Free School District and is connected to Rye Neck Middle School. Rye Neck High School offers 25 Advanced Placement classes as well as many electives such as robotics, journalism, and video production.

It serves the part of the Village of Mamaroneck that is within the Town of Rye and part of the City of Rye.

== Sports ==
- In 2017 the Rye Neck boys' varsity soccer team won the Section 1 Class B championship. The team advanced to the regional final, falling to Center Moriches High School.
- Rye Neck High School was ranked #140 on Newsweek's 2015 list of the Best High Schools in America
- Rye Neck High School was second runner-up for USA Weekend's 2007 "Showstopper Contest" for best high school musical, with their performance of Thoroughly Modern Millie. This beat out over 700 other entries.
- Four students from Rye Neck High School competed on The Challenge on News12 Westchester.
- In 2009–2010, Rye Neck boys' varsity soccer won the Section 1 Class B Championship with a 3-1 victory over Edgemont Junior/Senior High School but fell to 2–1 loss in their Regional Final, which was the farthest they had been in over a decade.
- In 2010–2011, Rye Neck boys' varsity soccer made it to the sectional finals (class B) for the third year in a row.
- Rye Neck's High School mock trial team has won numerous state championships and regional championships.
- In 2020, it was announced that long-time Rye Neck HS varsity softball coach Joan Spedafino had been selected for induction into the New York State High School Softball Hall of Fame, as part of the Induction Class of 2021.
- In 2013, Rye Neck's football team won the League and Section 1 Class C Championship, went on to win the class C regional finals. They played in the Class C State Championship in the Carrier Dome, only to lose 28-27 to New York State perennial power Chenango Forks High School, finishing with a school best 11–1 record.

== Notable alumni ==
- Harry Sisson (2021), influencer
- Patrick Meaney (2003), filmmaker
- Donna Rubin (born 1959), tennis player
- Carly Rose Sonenclar (2017), singer-songwriter and runner-up on The X Factor season 2
- Gary Young (born 1953), drummer for Pavement

== See also ==
- Immediato v. Rye Neck School District
