= Straight Arrow News =

American news website

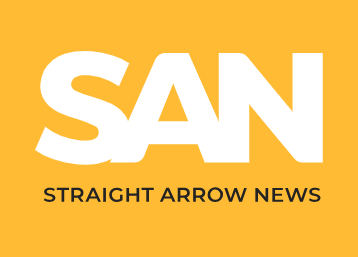

- Home page on September 28, 2025
- Company type: Media company
- Website type: News website
- Founded: 2021
- Dissolved: 2026
- Headquarters: Omaha, United States
- Area served: Worldwide
- Founder: Joe Ricketts
- Key people: Derek Mead
- Revenue: ▲$9.9 million (2025)
- Employees: 71
- Website: san.com
- Users: 1,800,000+
- Current status: Discontinued

Straight Arrow News (also known as Straight Arrow or SAN) was an American media company and news website founded in 2021 by billionaire and businessman John Ricketts. The company was based in Omaha, Nebraska and claimed to produce "unbiased news, without agenda." Ricketts announced the news outlet would cease operations in November 2026.

== History ==
=== Background ===
In January 2021, press secretary of Joe Ricketts, American billionaire and CEO of TD Ameritrade living in Nebraska, announced the upcoming launch of a news outlet that he claimed would aim to report news "without opinion or bias." The first reports of the outlet's launch appeared in the Omaha World Herald. The press secretary later revealed the name of the outlet, "Straight Arrow News", and said its launch was expected before the end of 2021. He said Ricketts chose this name for the outlet to emphasize its reliability that he compared to a "straight arrow that hits the bullseye." Ricketts stated that his family members would not be involved in SAN.

=== Company ===
The official launch of SAN took place in June 2021. SAN started with producing pre-recorded news segments in the studio, with SAN's anchors doing morning news updates. At the end of April 2024, SAN released an updated version of its app for download. In June 2025 the company said the app saw a 1,170% increase in traffic compared to June 2024. In April 2025, SAN chose Derek Mead, former editor of Vice Magazine, for the position of Chief Content Officer.

== Content, website and audience ==
On the website, news articles were divided into multiple sections: the first section presented the content, the second explained the importance of it, the third section summarized the article, and the fourth listed sources used to make the article. The website, along with the app, were relaunched on June 4, 2025. SAN redesigned the website and added new features, including its division of article into sections with summaries. In July 2025, Journalism.co.uk said SAN has 70 employees and utilized programmatic advertising. In 2026 the company added a premium subscription that was advertisment free.

== Activities ==
SAN partnered in 2025 with Jubilee Media to fact-check participants of its controversial "Surrounded" shows. SAN appeared in multiple debate episodes filmed by Jubilee where it was seen giving on-screen fact-checks.

== Closure ==
On November 6, 2026, CEO Joe Ricketts announced that SAN would cease editorial operations after five years in business. He wrote, "Belief in a mission does not by itself make a business sustainable." SAN issued refunds to its subscribers. Employees were notified the same day as the general public of the newsroom's closure.
