= Pineview =

Pineview or Pine View may refer to:

== Places ==
- Pineview, Ottawa or Pine View, a neighbourhood in Ottawa, Ontario, Canada
- Pineview, Western Cape, a suburb of Grabouw, South Africa
- Pineview, Georgia, a town in Wilcox County
- Pineview, North Carolina, an unincorporated community in Barbecue Township, Harnett County
- Pine View, Tennessee, an unincorporated community in Perry County
- Pineview, Texas, an unincorporated community in Wood County

== Schools ==
- Pineview Elementary, Prince George, British Columbia, Canada
- Pine View School, Osprey, Florida
- Pine View Middle School, Pasco County Schools, Florida
- Pine View High School, St. George, Utah
- Pineview Elementary School, Casper, Wyoming

== Other uses ==
- Pineview (microprocessor), a CPU microarchitecture used by Intel Atom processors
- Pine View Farm, a historic home in Hillsdale, New York
- Pineview (Roxobel, North Carolina) or Browne House, an historic plantation house
- Pineview Dam, a dam in Ogden Canyon, Utah
