= Sarasota County Schools =

School district in Florida, U.S.

Sarasota County School District
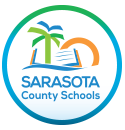

Location
- Sarasota County, Florida West Florida United States

District information
- Type: Public
- Grades: PK-12
- Superintendent: Terry Connor
- School board: 5 members
- Schools: 64
- Budget: $426 million
- NCES District ID: 1201680

Students and staff
- Students: 45,246 (2024–25)
- Teachers: 2,839.90 (on an FTE basis)
- Staff: 3,545.02 (on an FTE basis)
- Student–teacher ratio: 15.93

Other information
- Website: sarasotacountyschools.net

The District School Board of Sarasota, commonly known as Sarasota County Schools, is a public school district serving Sarasota County, Florida. As of 2017, it serves approximately 43,150 students.

The school district's leadership is often known internally and externally by the metonym The Landings, based on the location of its headquarters in The Landings neighborhood in South Sarasota.

== Elementary schools ==
- Alta Vista Elementary School
- Ashton Elementary School
- Atwater Elementary School
- Bay Haven Elementary School
- Brentwood Elementary School
- Cranberry Elementary School
- Emma E. Booker Elementary School
- Englewood Elementary School
- Fruitville Elementary School
- Garden Elementary School
- Glenallen Elementary School
- Gocio Elementary School
- Gulf Gate Elementary School
- Lakeview Elementary School
- Lamarque Elementary School
- Phillippi Shores Elementary School
- Southside Elementary School
- Tatum Ridge Elementary School
- Taylor Ranch Elementary School
- Toledo Blade Elementary School
- Tuttle Elementary School
- Venice Elementary School
- Wilkinson Elementary School

== Middle schools ==
- Booker Middle School
- Sarasota School of Arts and Sciences (Charter School)
- Brookside Middle School
- Heron Creek Middle School
- McIntosh Middle School
- Sarasota Middle School
- Venice Middle School
- Woodland Middle School

== K-8 school ==
- Laurel Nokomis School
- Sky Ranch School
- College preparatory academy at Wellen Park

== High schools ==
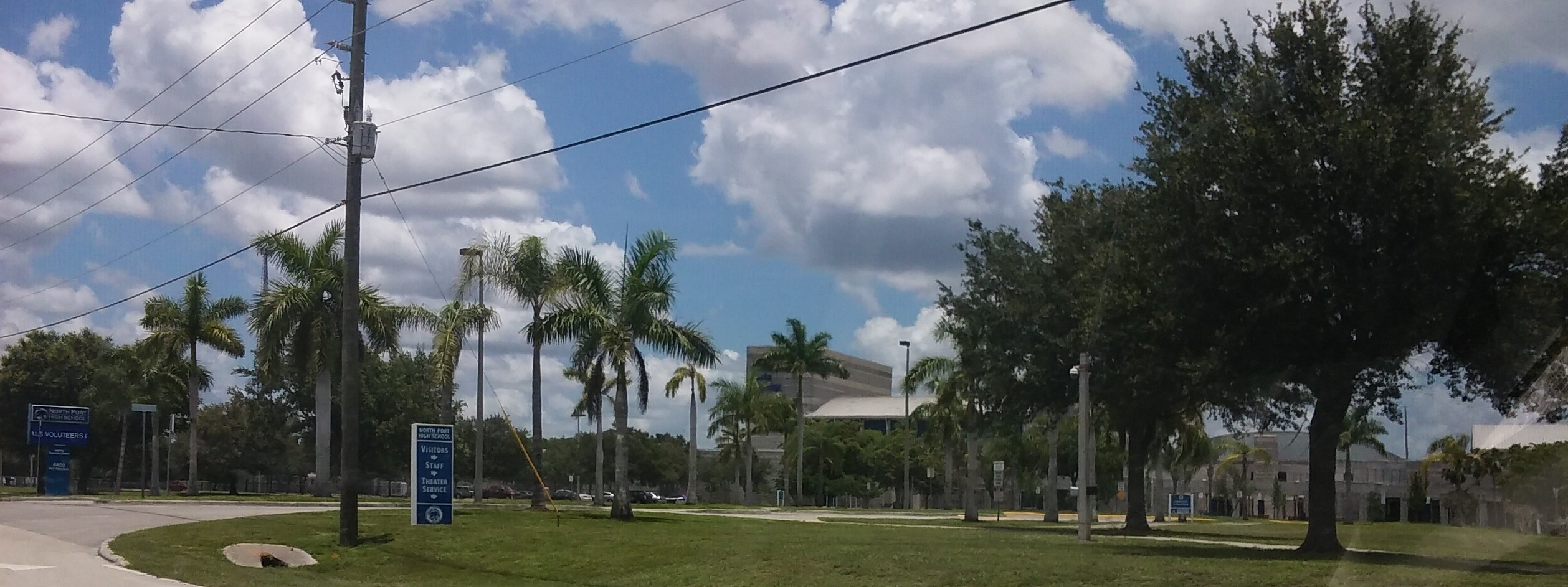
Entrance to North Port High School, home of the Bobcats

- Booker High School
- North Port High School
- Riverview High School
- Sarasota High School
- Venice High School
- Suncoast Polytechnical High School
- Wellen Park High School

== Special schools ==
- Suncoast Technical College
- Pine View School (2-12)
- Oak Park
- Adult and Community Enrichment Center
- North Triad
- South Triad

== Charter schools ==
- Sarasota School of Arts and Sciences
- Sarasota Suncoast Academy
- Suncoast School for Innovative Studies
- Island Village Montessori
- Sarasota Military Academy
- SKY Academy
- Student Leadership Academy
- Goodwill Academy
- Imagine School of North Port
