= Immediato v. Rye Neck School District =

U.S. Second Circuit Court of Appeals case

- Court: United States Court of Appeals for the Second Circuit
- Full case name: Daniel Immediato, et al v. Rye Neck School District, et al
- Argued: October 10, 1995
- Decided: January 2, 1996
- Citations: 73 F.3d 454 (2d. Cir. 1996); 64 USLW 2443; 106 Ed. Law Rep. 85

Case history
- Prior history: 873 F. Supp. 846 (S.D.N.Y. 1995)

Court membership
- Judges sitting: Jon O. Newman, Joseph M. McLaughlin, Pierre N. Leval

Case opinions
- Majority: McLaughlin, joined by Newman, Leval

Laws applied
- First Amendment; Fourteenth Amendment

Immediato v. Rye Neck School District, 73 F.3d 454 (2d. Cir. 1996) was a Second Circuit Court of Appeals case involving the petitioner, a boy named Daniel Immediato and his parents, Eugene and Diane Immediato, against the respondent, Rye Neck School District in the village of Mamaroneck, New York. The court held that the school district did not violate the Immediato's rights by requiring him to perform community service.

== Background ==
Daniel Immediato felt that the school district's policy of establishing mandatory community service was in violation of his 13th and 14th Amendment rights. The school district required that 40 hours of community service be completed to graduate with no exceptions. Regulations on what could be done for community service were fairly relaxed, as all work for non-profit organizations with the exception of religious organizations that did no charitable work was accepted as community service. As part of a mandatory senior-year course, students had to complete a form about what community service they did and how it benefited them, and afterwards discuss it with the class. Certain goals had to be reached by certain periods of the senior year; goals and requirements in which some students of school board members were exempt from having to complete.

== Complaint ==
Immediato brought forth the following charges: "Specifically, they assert that the program: (1) imposes involuntary servitude upon Daniel, in violation of the First Amendment; (2) infringes on Daniel's parents' Fourteenth Amendment right to direct his upbringing and education; (3) infringes on Daniel's personal liberty, in violation of the Fourteenth Amendment; and (4) violates Daniel's right to privacy, in violation of the Fourteenth Amendment."

== Result ==
The school district denied that any violation was made and argued that the court should abstain because of the ruling of Burford v. Sun Oil Co. (that federal court should not hear any case involving complicated state laws that deal with policy issues). The court decided against this Burford abstention but found that none of the charges were true. Immediato proceeded to appeal using the same charges. Immediato's arguments were found to be invalid, and the court stuck with their ruling that the school district did not violate any of Daniel or his parents' Constitutional rights in imposing community service.
