= Harry Sisson (influencer) =

American influencer and political commentator

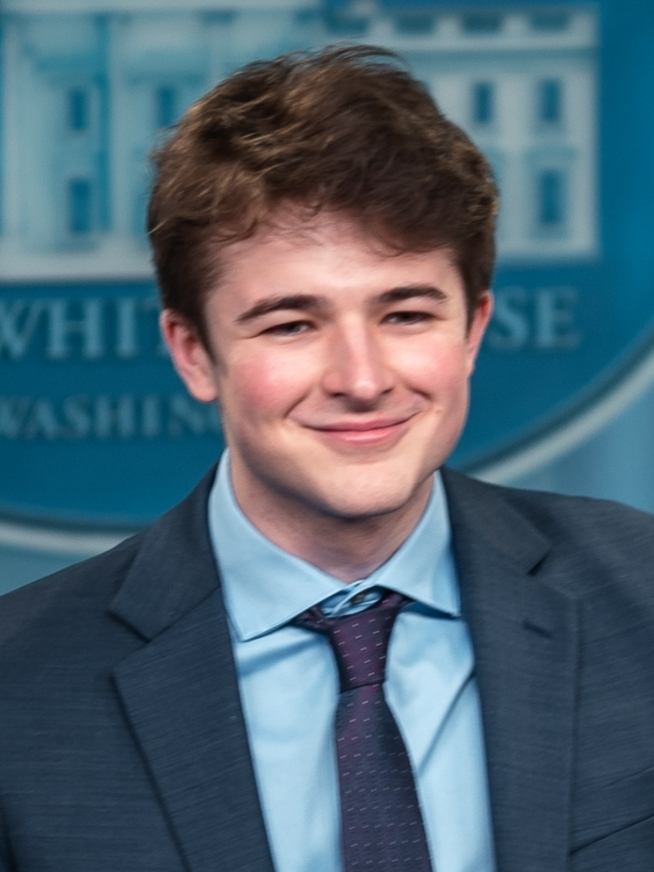
- Sisson in 2024
- Born: Harry Joseph Sisson; 2002 (age 23–24); Singapore
- Citizenship: Ireland; United States
- Education: George Washington University New York University (BA)
- Occupations: Social media influencer; political commentator
- Political party: Democratic

Instagram information
- Page: Harry Sisson
- Years active: 2022-present
- Genre: Politics
- Followers: 1.5 million

Substack information
- Notes: @harryjsisson
- Years active: 2025-present
- Topic: Politics
- Subscribers: 73 thousand

TikTok information
- Page: harryjsisson
- Years active: 2020–present
- Genre: Politics
- Followers: 2.3 million

X information
- Handle: @harryjsisson
- Display name: Harry Sisson
- Years active: 2011–present
- Followers: 399 thousand

YouTube information
- Channel: Harry Sisson
- Years active: 2022–present
- Genre: Politics
- Subscribers: 594 thousand
- Views: 185 million
- Last updated: August 27, 2026

Harry Joseph Sisson is a liberal political commentator and social media influencer based in the United States. He is known for posting political videos on TikTok and other platforms, frequently expressing support for Democratic Party policies and candidates including former President Joe Biden and former Vice President Kamala Harris. His videos are often aimed at engaging young voters and discussing current events from a liberal perspective.

== Early life and education ==
Sisson was born in Singapore to American parents of Irish descent and lived there for around 8 months. He then spent 5 years in Dubai as a child. Sisson then grew up in Dublin, where he attended junior school at St Conleth's College. According to Sisson, living in Europe shaped many of his beliefs. He holds dual citizenship in the United States and Ireland.

Sisson moved to New York at age 14 and attended Rye Neck High School where he would give a TEDx speech on the political aspects of climate change. He graduated high school in 2021, initially attending George Washington University from 2021 to 2022, and transferring to New York University, where he received his bachelor's degree in political science and government in 2025.

== Career ==
Sisson began posting about American politics during the 2020 U.S. presidential election on TikTok under the username @typical_democrat. He gained a following on TikTok in 2020 after posting videos in support of then presidential candidate Joe Biden. His content includes political commentary and reactions to news, often from a Democratic perspective. In the lead-up to the 2024 U.S. presidential election, Sisson's follower count grew, and his content became more widely circulated. Federal Election Commission filings show that liberal PAC Democracy Defense Action (including as its previous incarnation MeidasTouch) had paid Sisson several times for his social media consulting.

=== Political views and comments ===
Sisson has expressed support for Democratic Party policies, including healthcare expansion, climate legislation, gun control, LGBTQ rights, immigration, and student loan forgiveness. He has also voiced opposition to state-level library refusals and endorsed continued U.S. support for Ukraine. He voiced support for Emmanuel Macron in the 2022 French presidential election.

When the U.S. Supreme Court unanimously ruled that states could not disqualify Donald Trump from the 2024 presidential ballot, Sisson singled out Associate Justice Clarence Thomas for attack, calling him an "insurrection sympathizer". He had previously called Thomas "one of the most corrupt pieces of garbage to ever sit on the Supreme Court".

In early 2026, Sisson reiterated his consistent support for European and European Union (EU) sovereignty by denouncing Trump's plans for the United States to acquire Greenland and sided with Denmark and the EU. He shared comments from several European leaders, including Jonas Gahr Støre, Ulf Kristersson, Kristen Michal, Alexander Stubb, Donald Tusk, and Johann Wadephul; on behalf of Americans, he promised his fellow Europeans that he would continue working to get Trump and his friends out of office.

=== Media presence ===
Sisson has been profiled in media outlets such as The New York Times, Vanity Fair, Semafor, The Hollywood Reporter, and PBS NewsHour. In 2023, Sisson visited the White House and met with President Joe Biden and Vice President Kamala Harris as part of a digital creator outreach effort. In October 2025, Sisson appeared in an AI-generated video that Trump posted on his platform Truth Social. The video depicted Trump flying a plane, dumping feces over protesters at the No Kings protests.

== Citizenship status ==
Sisson holds citizenship in Ireland, as well as birthright citizenship in the United States by virtue of being born abroad to U.S. parents. In 2024, The Free Press issued a correction after it reported that Sisson was not a U.S. citizen and ineligible to vote. The publication acknowledged that Sisson is an American citizen who also holds Irish citizenship. On October 16, 2025, "Deport Harry Sisson" trended on social media platform X, sparking debate about Sisson's citizenship status. In an X post and a TikTok post, Sisson confirmed that he holds U.S. citizenship through birth to U.S. parents abroad.
