= Pine View School =

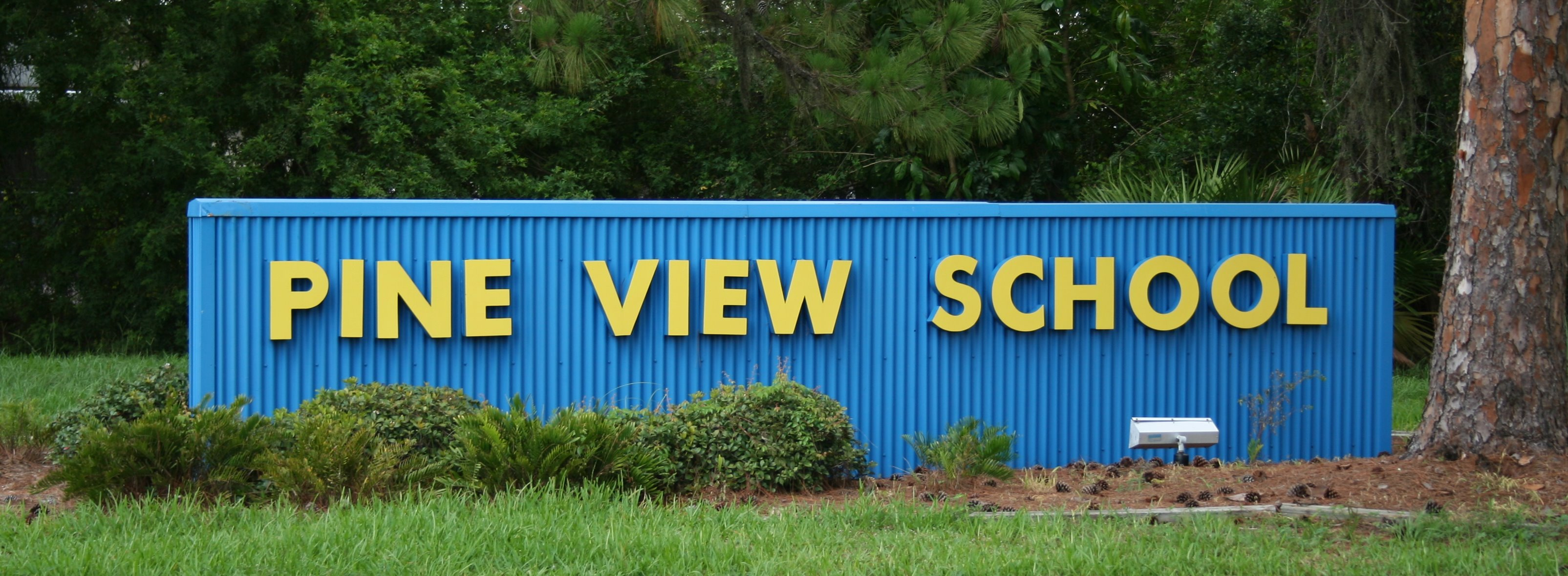
- Pine View's entrance sign

Location
- 1 Python Path; Osprey, Florida, Florida 34229; United States; 27°11′10″N 82°28′48″W

Information
- Other names: Pine View School for the Gifted
- Type: Magnet school
- Opened: 1968; 58 years ago
- School district: Sarasota County Public Schools
- NCES School ID: 120168001836
- Principal: Stephen Covert
- Teaching staff: 105.60 (on an FTE basis)
- Grades: 2–12
- Enrollment: 1,752 (2024-2025)
- Student to teacher ratio: 16.59
- Colors: Blue, yellow
- Mascot: Python
- Website: www.sarasotacountyschools.net/o/pineview

Pine View School for the Gifted, also known as Pine View School, is a public, college-preparatory, coeducational school in Osprey, Florida. Admission to Pine View is selective. It serves students from 2nd through 12th grades.

== History ==
Pine View was founded in 1961 as the state's first school for the intellectually gifted. The first director was John D. Woolever, an educator who had written numerous scholarly articles on education throughout his career. During the school's early history, many feared it would be closed, particularly when the school moved to its current campus, designed by Carl Abbott in 1994.

In 2007-2008, the Florida State Legislature considered abolishing the Exceptional Student Educational (ESE) label "gifted", and Pine View was included in a statewide comprehensive policy assessment completed by the Florida Legislature's Office of Program Policy Analysis & Government Accountability (OPPAGA). It determined that gifted programs were thriving and that the ESE label "gifted" had more advantages than disadvantages.

Steve Largo served as the principal from 1988 to 2013 and led the school to the top of U.S. News and World Reports ranking for the state of Florida on academic achievement year after year. At the end of the 2012–2013 school year, Steve Largo retired and Sarasota County published a decree that February 12 was "Steven Largo Day" in reference to Largo's motivational motto on water boiling point at 212 degree. Dr. Stephen Covert took Largo's place as Pine View principal on July 1, 2013.

In 2022, the class president's graduation speech went viral on social media and received national attention. After being told by the school principal that he could not mention LGBTQ rights in his speech, the class president instead euphemistically referred to his "curly hair" and thanked his classmates for their support.

== Academic recognition ==
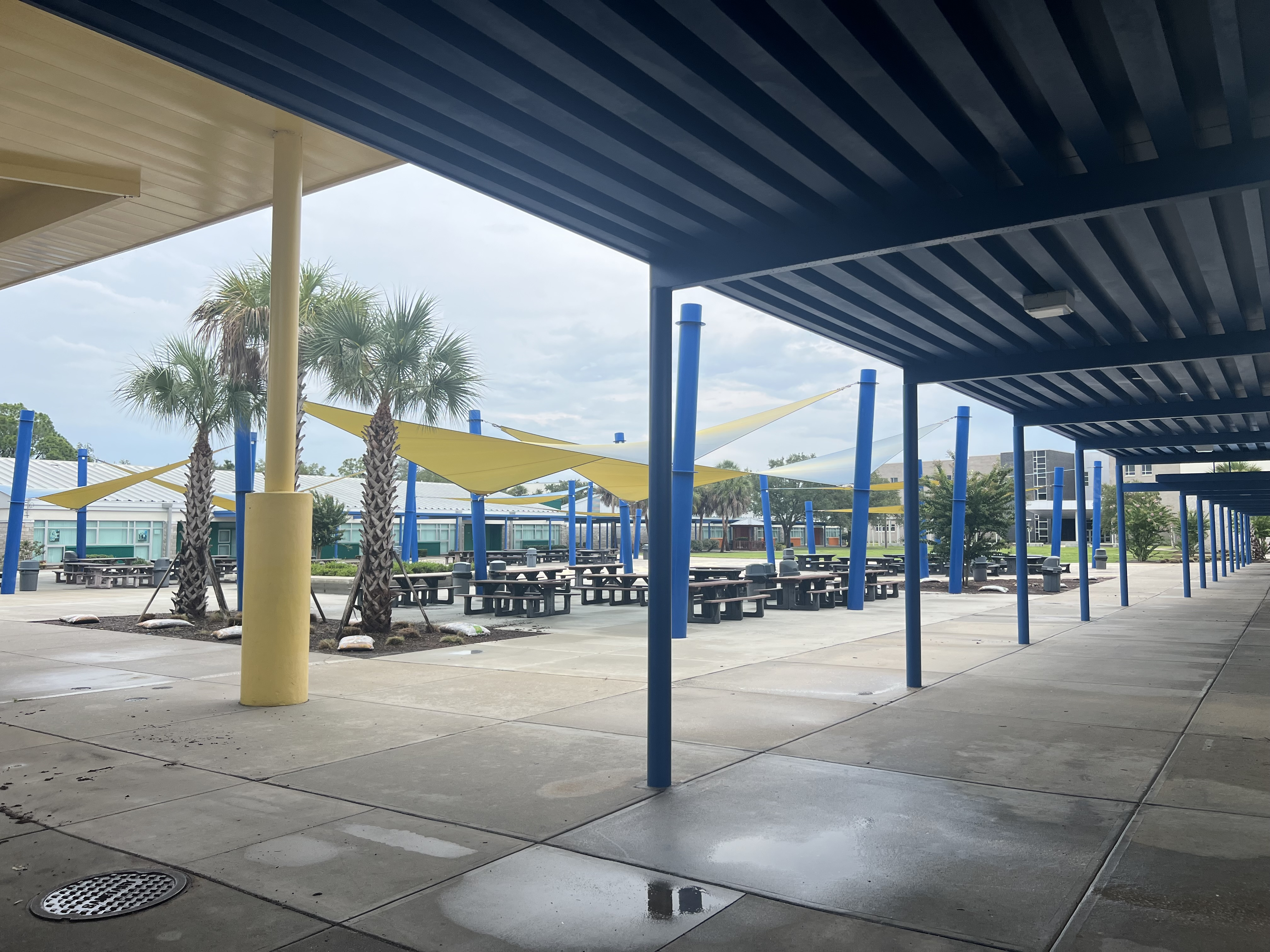
Interior courtyard at Pine View School.

During the 2003–2004 school year, Pine View School was recognized with the Blue Ribbon School Award of Excellence by the United States Department of Education, the highest award an American school can receive. Pine View won this award again in 2023.

In 2014 Pine View was ranked the number one school in Florida and the sixth-best school in the Country. In 2013, Pine View was ranked by U.S. News & World Report as the sixth-best public high school in the nation. The previous year, Newsweek ranked Pine View the 15th best public high school in the nation. Out of public and private schools, Pine View was rated the 6th best high school in the nation in 2007, 11th in 2008, 14th in 2009, 30th in 2012, and 6th in 2013 by U.S. News. Due to its average SAT score of 1335 for 2005, the school was listed among Newsweek magazine's 21 Public Elite American high schools. It was the only Public Elite school in Florida. Pine View's U.S. News & World Report 2012 national ranking was called into question when it seemed the ranking was significantly deflated when U.S. News calculated Pine View's 8th grade students as high school students who did not participate in Advanced Placement courses (a significant factor in its methodology) and incorrectly factored Pine View's AP pass rate.

In 2012, the Florida Department of Education ranked Pine View as the best Florida school that combined high school students with other grade levels. The ranking was produced by crunching state and national test data. In the same year, Pine View was ranked by Newsweek as the 4th best high school in Florida. U.S. News & World Report ranked Pine View the best high school in Florida, based on its 2013 national ranking. In 2009, Pine View was rated America's Best High School for Florida by Bloomberg Businessweek. In 2019 Pine View School was ranked No. 15 in National Rankings, No. 8 in Magnet High Schools and No. 23 in STEM High Schools.

== Admission requirements ==
As a full-time gifted program, Pine View maintains selective entrance requirements. Students may be referred for admission by administrators, teachers, staff members, or parents. Prospective students are admitted based on the gifted identification standards that are required by the Florida Department of Education. Since other Sarasota County district schools house gifted programs, an important part of admission is considering if Pine View's program best meets the student's educational needs. At Pine View, students must enroll at the beginning of each school year. Other district gifted programs enroll students during the school year.

== Curriculum ==
At the beginning of high school, students create four-year academic plans, which they change over time. This differentiated instruction results in a variety of math, English, science, social science, and foreign language levels being offered to students in the same grade.

Most high school courses are offered as honors (except where Florida statute prohibits the designations, such as in foreign language classes) and/or Advanced Placement (AP) courses. Students can start taking AP classes, the centerpiece of the Pine View curriculum, beginning in ninth grade. Dual enrollment (DE) classes, through partnerships with the University of Florida and the University of South Florida, are also offered on campus to high school students.

== Competitive teams ==
- Academic Olympics – Pine View's Academic Olympic Team competes on the county and contributes to the All-County team for the state tournament. The team holds tryouts during the year for prospective members and trains and competes weekly during the season. The team won the county championship every year until 1990. The team won the 2007, 2008, 2010, 2011, 2012, 2013, 2014, 2015, 2016, and 2018 county championships.
- Speech and Debate Team – in the 2011–2012 school year, the team placed in the Top 32 in the world in the International Public Policy Forum World Championship, sponsored by the Bickel and Brewer Law Firm and New York University.
- Model United Nations Team – Pine View's Model United Nations team was ranked in the top 150 programs of its kind within the country in the 2017-18 school year.

== Notable alumni ==
- John Chidsey, businessperson and Subway CEO.
- Ransom Riggs, author known for writing Miss Peregrine's Home for Peculiar Children.
- Nathan J. Robinson, editor-in-chief and cofounder for Current Affairs.
- Noelia Voigt, winner of Miss USA in 2023.
- Clark Dean, Olympic Medalist in rowing in 2024.
- Adele Romanski, film producer of Moonlight.
