= Jubilee Media =

American mass media company

Jubilee, Inc.
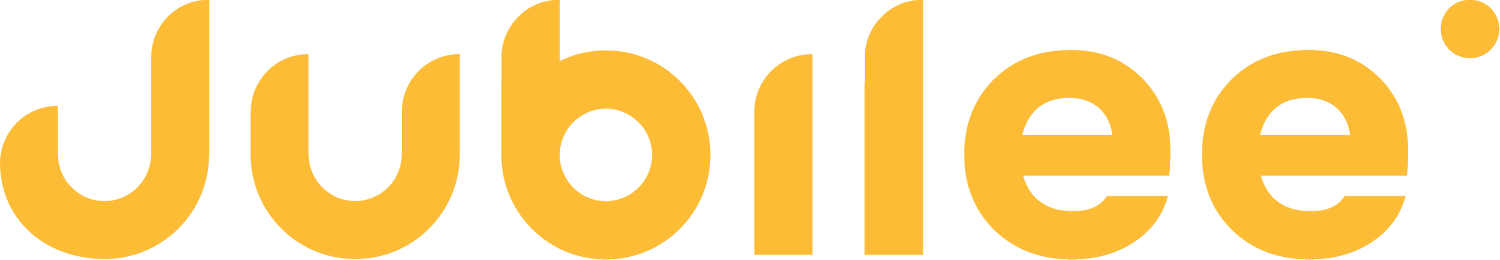
- Trade name: Jubilee Media
- Type: Private
- Industry: Media
- Founded: 2017; 9 years ago
- Founder: Jason Y. Lee
- Headquarters: Los Angeles, California, United States

YouTube information
- Channel: jubilee
- Years active: 2010–present
- Subscribers: 10.6 million
- Views: 3 billion
- Last updated: November 24, 2025
- Website: jubileemedia.com

Jubilee, Inc., trading as Jubilee Media, is an American media company. It runs the Jubilee YouTube channel, which has 10.9 million subscribers as of June 2026, and the Nectar dating app.

== History ==
Jubilee was established by entrepreneur Jason Y. Lee. Lee founded Jubilee as a non-profit company in 2010; it later transitioned into a for-profit company in 2017 after raising over $650,000. In September 2022, Jubilee announced they had raised over $1,000,000, and had launched a new channel called Nectar, centered around romantic relationships.

Lee wanted to create a media company to make content that helps people "see each other as humans." When raising money for Jubilee, he encountered significant resistance from venture capitalists, receiving "83 no's" before securing funding. Despite the rejections, Lee remained confident in his vision, stating: "I was like, 'No this is exactly what this generation wants and needs and also I think it's going to be incredibly profitable. I think it's going to be really lucrative to do this.'"

Jubilee's YouTube content shifted towards politics after the 2016 U.S. presidential election. Lee, "disappointed" by the division in the United States, sought to create content encouraging political discussions across spectrums. According to him, the company is politically neutral and hires producers and editors with a variety of viewpoints. Lee has expressed that his goal for balanced content is achieved when "we get equal amount of cancelling from both sides that would be great because that means that we've done it in a way that doesn't feel biased or skewed one way or another."

Lee has described his vision for Jubilee as creating the "Disney of empathy."

In 2025, Jubilee launched Nectar, a dating app.

== Content ==
According to its founder, the purpose of Jubilee's content is to "provoke understanding and create human connection" across political spectrums. Several prominent figures, including Pete Buttigieg, Ben Shapiro, Steven Kenneth "Destiny" Bonnell II, Charlie Kirk, Jordan Peterson, Sam Seder, Mehdi Hasan and Dean Withers, have appeared in Jubilee's Surrounded series. Statements made in the series are fact-checked by Straight Arrow News.

When questioned about the value of finding middle ground between extreme viewpoints, such as flat-earthers, Lee has stated that the company evaluates whether they are "doing more good than harm" and seeks to find empathy even in conversations with people holding scientifically disputed beliefs. Regarding concerns about platforming individuals with controversial views, Lee has acknowledged the difficulty of determining "where the line is" between legitimate discourse and hate speech, noting that the company receives criticism from both sides of the political spectrum for featuring opposing viewpoints.

Jubilee has several series, including:

- Ask Me Anything, where people ask a person relevant to a certain societal topic questions.
- Eating With the Enemy, where two people from opposing backgrounds dine together while discussing political issues.
- Middle Ground, where two opposing sides have a debate and attempt to find common ground.
- Odd One Out, where a secret mole (or sometimes two) is in a group, and has to be spotted by others through questions.
- Seeking Secrets, where people read strangers secrets on a certain topic.
- Spectrum, where people belonging to an identity measure their beliefs by moving to the left or right.
- Ranking, where people rank each other on a certain societal topic.
- Versus 1, where someone speed dates many people in hopes of finding a match.
- Tea for Two, where people see if they can fall in love with someone after a certain number of questions.
- The Verdict, where people get a past criminal case and have to agree on a criminal sentence before they get revealed what the criminal actually got sentenced.
- Circle of Secrets, where a group of people with similarities can open up.
- The Dilemma, where people have to make a life changing decision for a person in a tough situation.
- Surrounded, where a prominent figure is surrounded by and debates several opponents.

Jubilee also has several series that have been discontinued, including:

- Mask Off, where a group of people can share their opinions on a topic anonymously.
- The One, where a group of 100 people must find out who most exemplifies a specified characteristic (e.g. best looking body, highest IQ).

In 2024, the most popular video on the channel was titled "30 vs 1: Dating App in Real Life", where a man swipes left and right on possible dates in a way similar to that of the app Tinder.

The company has also produced controversial content, including a Middle Ground episode featuring people with anorexia and obesity discussing eating disorders and body image issues.

Jubilee Media has been featured in many reaction videos on YouTube, including those of PewDiePie. Several of their debate videos had garnered publicity during the 2024 U.S. presidential election cycle, including a video where conservative pundit Ben Shapiro debates a transgender man.

Wajahat Ali, a New York Times Contributing Op-Ed writer, said Jubilee is "like Squid Game plus 'gotcha' plus viral moments."

== Criticism ==
=== Effect on political discourse ===
Disability rights activist Imani Barbarin, who rejected an invitation to participate in a video, said the company's content is "what the memeification of politics looks like in practice."

Kyndall Cunningham of Vox described the Surrounded series as a "satire of what debate has become in the age of Donald Trump: extremely competitive, theatrical, and unbalanced (literally and emotionally) to boot." Comparing the series to a "MrBeast-inspired game show," she noted that online political debate content such as this has increased in popularity in the Trump era.

=== Legitimizing extremist views for traffic ===
The Michigan Daily criticized Jubilee for platforming right-wing activists, including Ben Shapiro and Charlie Kirk.

Following his appearance on the show, Mehdi Hasan detailed several concerns about the company's practices in an interview with The Bulwark. He criticized their vetting process after discovering that one participant was "a well-known anti-Semite and associate of Nick Fuentes who uses a pseudonym online," questioning how the individual "got past the quote unquote vetting." Hasan argued that the show misrepresented its participants, noting that while it was pitched as "one progressive vs 20 far-right conservatives," many participants were "explicitly fascist, white nationalist, or fascist-adjacent rather than typical Trump supporters." When later accused on X of agreeing to debate Nazis, he responded: "that's not how the debate was sold to me. You can see my shock when they start expressing their views openly." Hasan acknowledged the criticism he received from the left for participating, noting the "very strong no platforming of fascist principle" and expressing concern that extremist participants were "loving this moment" online and claiming victory within their echo chambers.

Wajahat Ali, a New York Times Contributing Op-Ed writer, said, "Jubilee knew what it was doing. ... If one or two Nazis slip, it happens. That wasn't just one or two fascists or Nazis, Mehdi. ... I believe they were very deliberate in inviting these right-wingers to provoke this type of sentiment because they knew it would go viral."

Emma Vigeland of The Majority Report with Sam Seder criticized the company's approach, stating: "I do think Jubilee is doing something that is essentially laundering more and more far-right kind of people into what is considered a political debate and discourse space because it's more inflammatory the more fascistic you get. ... The more inflammatory the statement is, the more that the algorithms circulate it. So they know this, and that's why they're continuing to book people who are further and further right."

Media critic Taylor Lorenz also highlighted the platform's exploitation of algorithmic systems, noting that "the more inflammatory the statement is, the more that the algorithms circulate" and that the company knowingly capitalizes on this by booking people "further and further right."

When asked about content standards, Lee described the company's "harm clause," explaining: "Maybe the best metaphor is we've got a table that's set for everyone. Everyone has a seat at the table. But if you're going to be at the table and you start to throw forks at other individuals or you're going to flip over the table, then you're no longer welcome. So by harm clause, I mean if you're advocating for deliberate harm towards other individuals or there's risk of actual physical harm in person, that's something that we won't entertain or even discuss." However, this policy has been questioned in light of participants featured on the show. Connor Estelle, who appeared in the Hasan "Surrounded" episode, stated to his opponent: "I frankly don't care being called the Nazi. ... Well, they persecuted the church a little bit. I'm not a fan of that. .. I think you can say I'm a fascist. ... I'm not ashamed of that whatsoever." Estelle also said he supported an autocratic ruler for the United States, and when asked what he would do if the autocrat "kills you and your family," he said, "Well, I'm not going to be a part of the group that he kills."

=== Selective editing ===
Hasan indicated that racist content was edited out of the final broadcast, stating "there was racist [expletive] that didn't make the cut."

The company has also faced scrutiny over editorial practices. In an interview with Semafor, Lee acknowledged that they gave Pete Buttigieg's team editorial input over his "Surrounded" episode, stating: "We gave some input, yeah." He admitted this was not standard practice for all guests and indicated the company would not repeat this arrangement in the future, explaining that the decision was made for "legal reasons" due to Buttigieg's role in the administration at the time.

=== False equivalency disguised as neutrality ===
Lorenz has raised concerns about the company's approach to creating "middle ground" content, arguing that the concept of finding neutral middle ground between "hyper progressivism and fascism" is problematic. She criticized what she termed "performative middle ground theater," where discussions focus on having "everyone compromise to agree on some sort of theoretical middle ground" rather than substantively addressing issues.

The asymmetry in platform treatment was highlighted when Hasan told Ali, "Jordan Peterson (a conservative commentator) goes on and debates 20 atheists and there are a bunch of liberal smart college kids who address him in good faith. I go on and I get a bunch of Nazis."
