= Harrison, New York =

Harrison
- Coterminous town/village
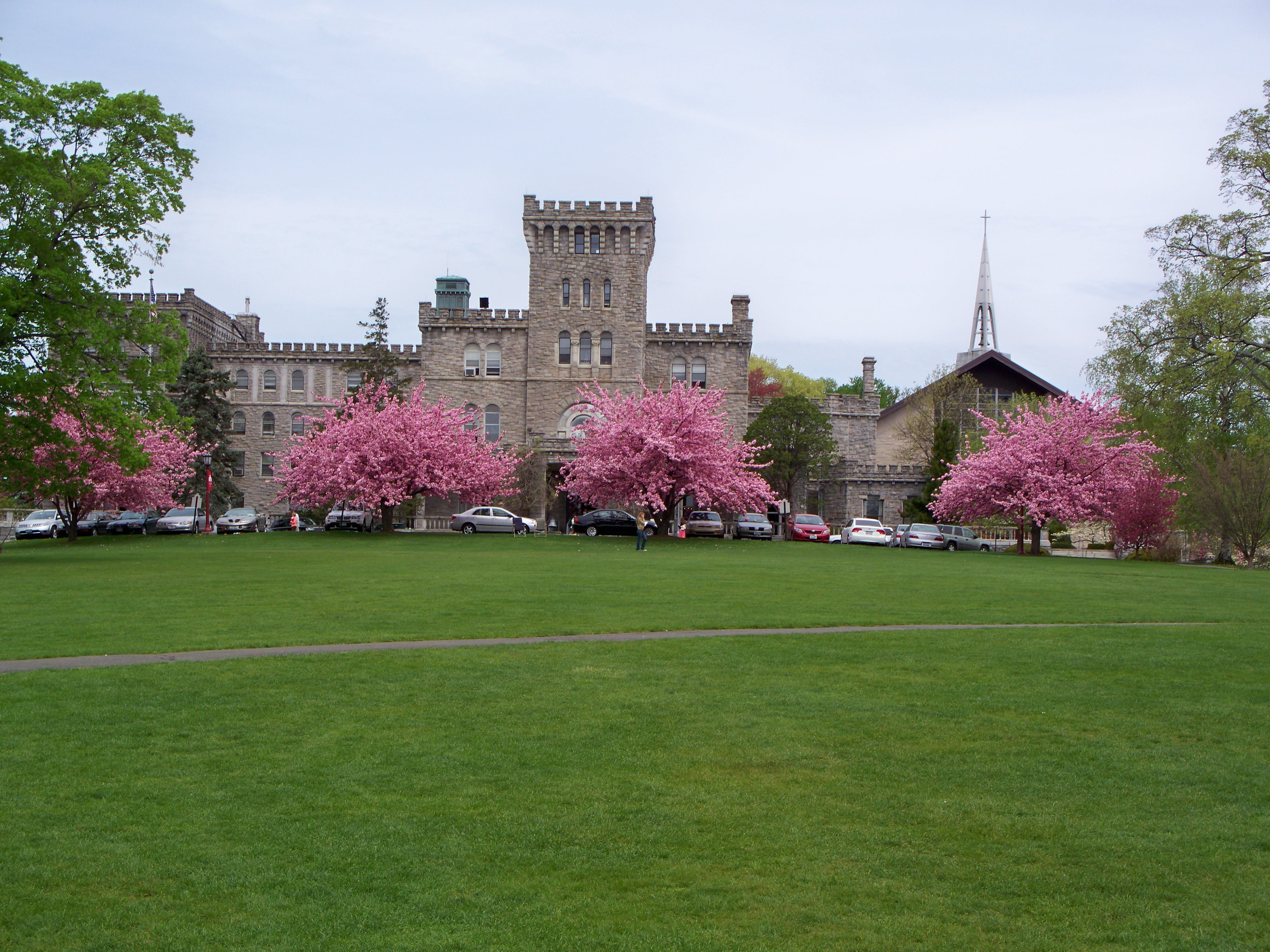
- Manhattanville University in Purchase, a hamlet of Harrison

- Flag Seal

- Location of Harrison, New York
- Coordinates: 41°0′25″N 73°43′5″W
- Country: United States
- State: New York
- County: Westchester
- Founded: 1696
- Town: March 7, 1788
- Town/village: 1975
- Named for: John Harrison

Government
  - Type: Mayor–council government
  - Supervisor/Mayor: Tom Scappaticci (R)

Area
  - Total: 17.44 sq mi (45.17 km^{2})
  - Land: 16.76 sq mi (43.42 km^{2})
  - Water: 0.68 sq mi (1.75 km^{2})
- Elevation: 69 ft (21 m)

Population (2020)
  - Total: 28,218
  - Density: 1,683.1/sq mi (649.84/km^{2})
- Demonym: Harrisonite
- Time zone: UTC−5 (Eastern (EST))
  - Summer (DST): UTC−4 (Eastern (EDT))
- ZIP Code: 10528, 10604
- Area code: 914
- FIPS code: 36-32402
- GNIS feature ID: 0977345
- Website: www.harrison-ny.gov

Harrison is a town and village in Westchester County, New York, United States. It is a suburb of New York City, located approximately 11 miles (18 km) northeast of Manhattan. The population was 28,218 at the 2020 census.

== History ==
=== 17th century ===
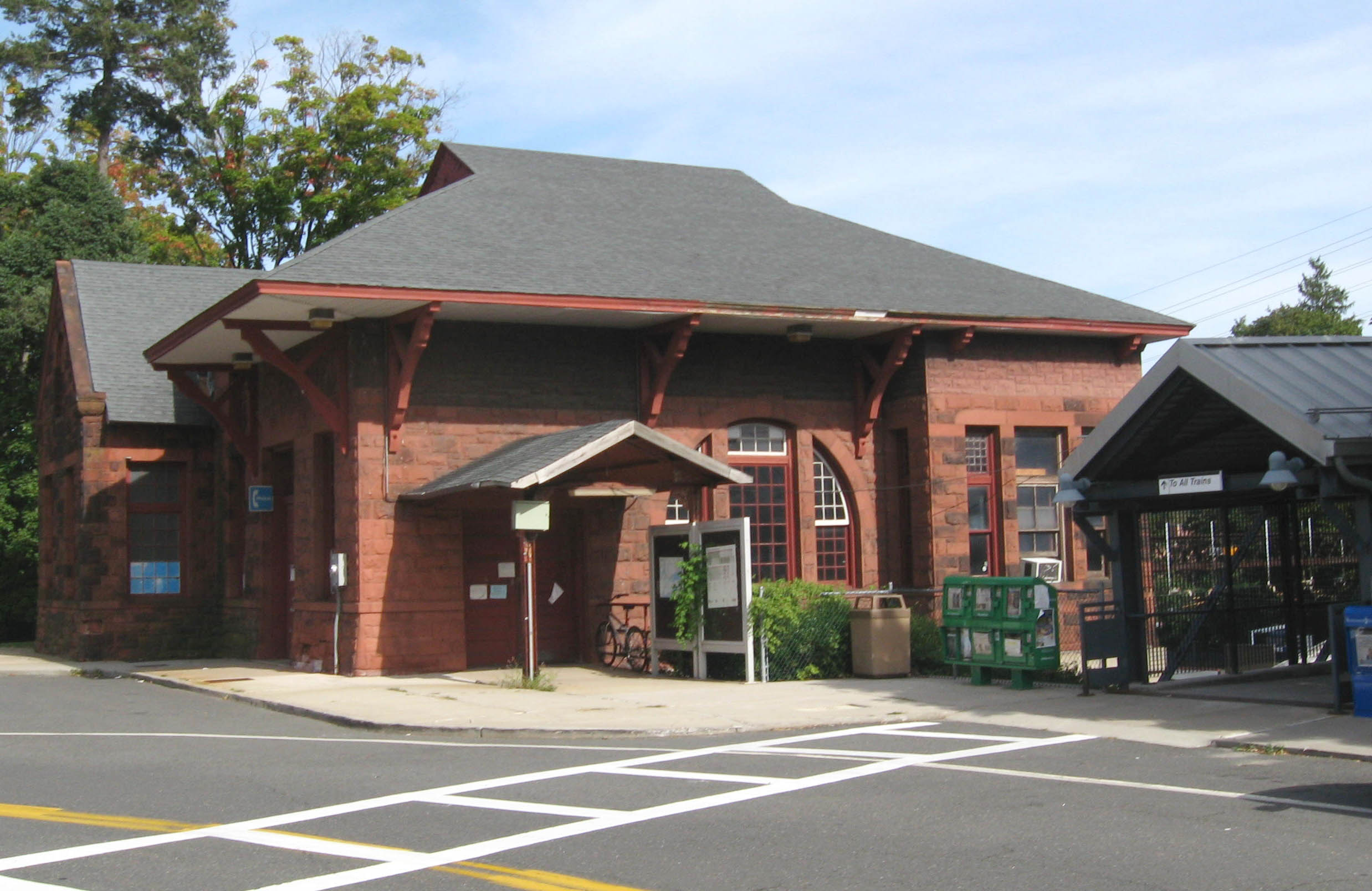
Harrison Metro-North Railroad station house

Harrison was established in 1696 by a patent granted by the British government to John Harrison and three others, who had a year earlier bargained with local Native Americans to purchase an area of land above Westchester Path, an old trail that led from Manhattan to Port Chester and below Rye Lake. Local custom holds that Harrison was given 24 hours to ride his horse around the area he could claim, and the horse could not swim or did not want to get its feet wet, but this is folklore. In fact, the land below Westchester Path and along Long Island Sound had already been purchased and partly developed by the settlers of Rye, New York.

The area that became Harrison had also been sold in 1661 or 1662, and again in 1666, to Peter Disbrow, John Budd, and other investors or early residents of Rye. Disbrow and Budd evidently lost their paperwork and the land was ultimately granted to Harrison and his co-investors in 1696. So upset were the people of Rye that they seceded to the Colony of Connecticut until 1700, when the King of England ordered Rye to rejoin the Colony of New York.

=== 18th century ===
The first permanent residents of Harrison's Purchase, as it was called, arrived in about 1725, and many early settlers were Quakers, who set up a Friend's Meeting House at a settlement located in the part of Harrison now called Purchase. Harrison's Purchase was administered jointly by the settlers of Rye until it was incorporated as a town on March 7, 1788, by an act of the New York State legislature.

Merritt's Hill in West Harrison was part of the site of the Battle of White Plains during the Revolutionary War. One company of the New York Militia that fought in the battle was composed solely of people from Harrison.

=== 19th century ===
During the 1830s, David Haviland settled in Harrison where he produced Haviland China which he sold in his store in New York City before returning to his native France. Today there exists a Haviland Street in the downtown business district, as well as a Haviland Road in the Sterling Ridge neighborhood of Harrison, whose only street sign is of a historic wrought iron design in scrolled shapes, quite older than many others throughout the town.

In 1867, Benjamin Holladay purchased a tract of land, which is now the campus of Manhattanville College. He constructed an elaborate granite mansion, now known as the college's Reid Castle, and an elaborate Norman-style Roman Catholic chapel for his wife. The castle hosted the King and Queen of Siam in the early 1930s. The castle was at one time known as Ophir House, in reference to different owners.

In 1875, Sunny Ridge farm mansion was renovated to include a 14th-century woodcut from Europe, installed into the wall over the living room fireplace, among several other ancient relics, built into the home. The home was sold for the first time since the 1920s renovation in the summer of 2017, and was demolished to make way for two new homes. It was not protected by any state or local historic preservation acts.

What is the present-day Metro-North Railroad's New Haven Line, running from Manhattan in New York City, to Greenwich, Connecticut, first came through Harrison in 1848, though the first station was not built until 1870. Before that time, Harrisonites had to flag down the train to get a ride. Harrison remained generally free of factories through the Industrial Revolution, while large factory districts grew in the neighboring towns of White Plains, Port Chester and Mamaroneck.

=== 20th century ===
In 1929, the Hutchinson River Parkway was extended to Harrison. The same year, Harrison's former Sunnyridge Farm, located less than a half mile from the train station, was purchased by real estate developer Sidney H. Sonn, of H. & S. Sonn Co., based in New York City, and subdivided into lots for a real estate development.

H. & S. Sonn laid out new streets throughout, preserving the farm's private access road to the farm residence as today's Sunny Ridge Road. According to a 1928 article in The New York Times, "[H. & S. Sonn] virtually transformed their part of the old farm into a park, installed winding tree-lined motorways and water, gas, sewers, and electricity, and landscaped the entire 165 acres, then they erected ten English-type houses which were designed by Julius Gregory, one of them being completely furnished by Charles of London." H. & S. Sonn contracted Julius Gregory to develop house plans for single family houses in their new Sunny Ridge development, as it was termed. A new model was developed to construct homes that were of durable materials, to be resistant to exterior maintenance, using only brick, stone, and old-growth oak timber as exterior materials. The fashionable new neighborhood attracted the attention of New York banking, business, and entertainment elites, attracting Wall Street financier William Harty, then owner of Condé Nast, Joseph J. Lane; musical star Louise Groody; and Fitzhugh Green, of Putnam's Publishing House, among the first residents of the new neighborhood.

Sidney Sonn renovated the farm's original house, an immense, elaborate, 20-room, 1875 Victorian mansion, into an English Tudor, designed by renowned architect Julius Gregory, father of the American Tudor-Revival style and movement of the 1920s, as a residence for himself.

Only a small handful of homes were sold and constructed before the economic downturn of the Great Depression. The remaining vast majority of homes were constructed beginning in the middle-1940s, with the last plots filled during the 1950s. The styles of the newer, 1940s-era homes was primarily of colonial revival style, with the newest ranging into Mid-century-Modern. The older, Tudor homes as a result remain quite notable.

In 1967, 200 residents stated support for a plan to incorporate Purchase, a community in Harrison, so that corporations could not build in the community. In response, officials from the Town of Harrison put forward plans to try to become a city to try to stop Purchase from seceding from Harrison. The resolution was for the Town became a hybrid "Town / Village", which it remains today.

John A. Passidomo (1921–2005) was first elected mayor in 1965 by only 67 votes. Re-elected eight times, he served until 1983 when he resigned to become Commissioner of the New York State Department of Motor Vehicles. In his two and a half years at that job, he helped pass one of the nation's first seat-belt laws despite the law's unpopularity.

Harrison's "Platinum Mile", a string of corporate office parks along I-287 in the Purchase section of Harrison, developed under Passidomo. The mayor played an instrumental role in attracting large corporations such as PepsiCo, MasterCard and Texaco.

In the early 1970s, under Passidomo's supervision, a group in the Purchase section of town, concerned about the town's overdevelopment, attempted to incorporate as a village and thereby separate from the town of Harrison. Creatively, to avoid being served papers that would have begun the legal proceedings for Purchase to incorporate as a village, Passidomo entered his office through the fire escape. He then immediately made sure that the town Harrison became a village but remained as a town to end to the possibility of Purchase's secession, since a village cannot legally be formed in another village.

The documented list of supervisors and mayors begins in 1946; though there were mayors before that. The documented list includes:

- Alfred F. Sulla Jr. 1946–1955
- James M. Landis 1955-1958
- Alfred F. Sulla Jr. 1958–1965
- John Passidomo 1965–1983
- Pat V. Angarano 1983–1990
- Charles Balancia 1990–1994
- Philip A. Marraccini (R) 1994–1998
- Ronald Bianchi (D) 1998–2002
- Stephen Malfitano (R) 2002–2008
- Joan Walsh (D) 2008–2012
- Ronald Belmont (R) 2012–2022
- Richard Dionisio (R) 2022–2025
- Tom Scappaticci (R) 2026-present

== Geography ==
Harrison is a town and village in Westchester County, New York, approximately 22 miles (35 km) northeast of Manhattan, New York City. According to the U.S. Census Bureau, the town (and coterminous village) has a total area of 17.4 square miles (45 km^{2}), of which 16.8 square miles (44 km^{2}) is land and 0.6 square miles (1.6 km^{2}), or 3.22%, is water. The population was 27,472 at the 2010 census.

The distance from Harrison Station to Grand Central Terminal in Midtown Manhattan is about 27 miles (43 km).

Harrison is bordered by North Castle, White Plains, Rye town, Rye city, Mamaroneck, and Scarsdale. The New England Thruway (I-95) runs through the town (without any interchanges), as well as the Cross Westchester Expressway and the Hutchinson River Parkway. I-684 passes through Harrison and ends at the Cross Westchester Expressway and the Hutchinson Parkway.

=== Climate ===
Climate data for Harrison, New York
Month	Jan	Feb	Mar	Apr	May	Jun	Jul	Aug	Sep	Oct	Nov	Dec	Year
Mean daily maximum °F (°C)	35 (2)	39 (4)	47 (8)	58 (14)	68 (20)	77 (25)	82 (28)	80 (27)	73 (23)	62 (17)	51 (11)	40 (4)	59 (15)
Mean daily minimum °F (°C)	21 (−6)	23 (−5)	29 (−2)	39 (4)	49 (9)	59 (15)	64 (18)	63 (17)	55 (13)	44 (7)	36 (2)	27 (−3)	42 (6)
Average precipitation inches (mm)	3.78 (96)	3.10 (79)	4.52 (115)	4.40 (112)	4.12 (105)	4.25 (108)	3.71 (94)	4.16 (106)	4.72 (120)	4.41 (112)	3.97 (101)	4.32 (110)	49.46 (1,258)
Source: The Weather Channel

=== Areas and neighborhoods ===
The boundaries of the town of Harrison are the approximate shape of a figure-eight. The southern half is known as simply Harrison, or downtown, while the hamlets of Purchase and West Harrison are located in the northern portion of the town. The "downtown" southern half of Harrison is divided into four general areas: Brentwood Plaza, Sunny Ridge, Sterling Ridge/The Trails, and the Village part of Harrison.

West Harrison is an isolated community, lodged between a tall hill bordered by a lake, Interstate 287, a tall relatively steep hill, and a cliff at the northern edge. Because of this, there is a general lack of street entrances. There is really only one road into it, although there are a few other "back" ways into it. The road is called Lake Street, flanked on one side by Silver Lake Park, bordering the lake, and by a small business district on the other side of the street. West Harrison contains the Passidomo Veterans Memorial Park and Pool and the Leo Mintzer Center. West Harrison also contains the site of the Battle of White Plains from the Revolutionary War. West Harrison is also the home of Buckout Road, which was said to have been a home of witches, albinos, and slaughters.

Downtown is split into the four sections mentioned above, and is flanked by Interstate 95, the Hutchinson River Parkway, and the Metro-North Railroad. The man-made lines create isolation to areas, with few areas to cross each. Harrison's only middle school, Louis M. Klein Middle School, and only High School, Harrison High School, are located in the "downtown" area. The four areas of downtown, as separated by the boundaries of Interstate 95 and the railroad tracks as well as separated by wealth gaps, are very diverse. The "Downtown" with Halstead Ave as the main thoroughfare, starting on the City of Rye border, is parallel to the Metro North railroad, delivers traffic into the Village of Mamaroneck. This area consists of mixed use century old buildings with new luxury rentals taking over the area. Flanking Halstead Ave are streets consisting of older two- family homes with new duplexes gentrifying the community. The housing stock consists of every wealth level.

== Demographics ==
Historical population
Census	Pop.	Note	%±
1980	23,046		—
1990	23,308		1.1%
2000	24,154		3.6%
2010	27,472		13.7%
2020	28,218		2.7%
U.S. Decennial Census

As of 2026, Harrison is home to a notable Japanese community.

=== 2020 census ===
Harrison village, New York – Racial and ethnic composition Note: the US Census treats Hispanic/Latino as an ethnic category. This table excludes Latinos from the racial categories and assigns them to a separate category. Hispanics/Latinos may be of any race.
Race / Ethnicity (NH = Non-Hispanic)	Pop 2010	Pop 2020	% 2010	% 2020
White alone (NH)	21,133	18,780	76.93%	66.55%
Black or African American alone (NH)	563	745	2.05%	2.64%
Native American or Alaska Native alone (NH)	15	10	0.05%	0.04%
Asian alone (NH)	2,062	3,231	7.51%	11.45%
Native Hawaiian or Pacific Islander alone (NH)	8	4	0.03%	0.01%
Other race alone (NH)	69	182	0.25%	0.64%
Mixed race or Multiracial (NH)	420	864	1.53%	3.06%
Hispanic or Latino (any race)	3,202	4,402	11.66%	15.60%
Total	27,472	28,218	100.00%	100.00%

=== 2010 census ===
In the 2010 census the population was 76.9 percent non-Hispanic white, 2.4 percent African American, 7.5 percent Asian, and 11.7% Hispanic or Latino of any descent.

=== 2000 census ===
At the 2000 census, there were 24,154 people, 8,394 households and 6,186 families residing in the village. The population density was 1,435.2 inhabitants per square mile (554.1/km^{2}). There were 8,680 housing units at an average density of 515.8 units per square mile (199.2 units/km^{2}). The racial makeup of the village was 89.78% White, 1.43% Black or African American, 0.09% Native American, 5.44% Asian, 0.01% Pacific Islander, 1.59% from other races, and 1.67% from two or more races. Hispanic or Latino of any race were 6.70% of the population.

There were 8,394 households, of which 35.3% had children under the age of 18 living with them, 62.4% were married couples living together, 8.7% had a female householder with no husband present, and 26.3% were non-families. 22.1% of all households were made up of individuals, and 8.7% had someone living alone who was 65 years of age or older. The average household size was 2.72 and the average family size was 3.20.

24.5% of residents were under the age of 18, 9.6% from 18 to 24, 29.4% from 25 to 44, 21.9% from 45 to 64, and 14.6% who were 65 years of age or older. The median age was 37 years. For every 100 females, there were 89.2 males. For every 100 females age 18 and over, there were 85.2 males.

According to a 2009 estimate, the median household income was $104,640, and the median family income was $130,224. The per capita income for the village was $63,742. About 4.2% of families and 5.6% of the population were below the poverty line, including 5.3% of those under age 18 and 7.8% of those age 65 or over.

== Economy ==
Harrison is and has been home to the corporate headquarters of several well-known companies, including the MasterCard headquarters, MasterCard International Global Headquarters, PepsiCo, and Central National-Gottesman. Atlas Air and subsidiary Polar Air Cargo have their headquarters in Purchase. Texaco's headquarters, a 750,000-square-foot (70,000 m^{2}) building, was in Harrison. In 2002, after Chevron and Texaco merged, Chevron sold the former Texaco Headquarters to Morgan Stanley. Morgan Stanley bought the building and the surrounding 107 acres (0.43 km^{2}) for $42 million. Previously, Lenovo had its U.S. headquarters in Purchase. In 2006, the company announced it was moving to Morrisville, North Carolina.

== Arts and culture ==
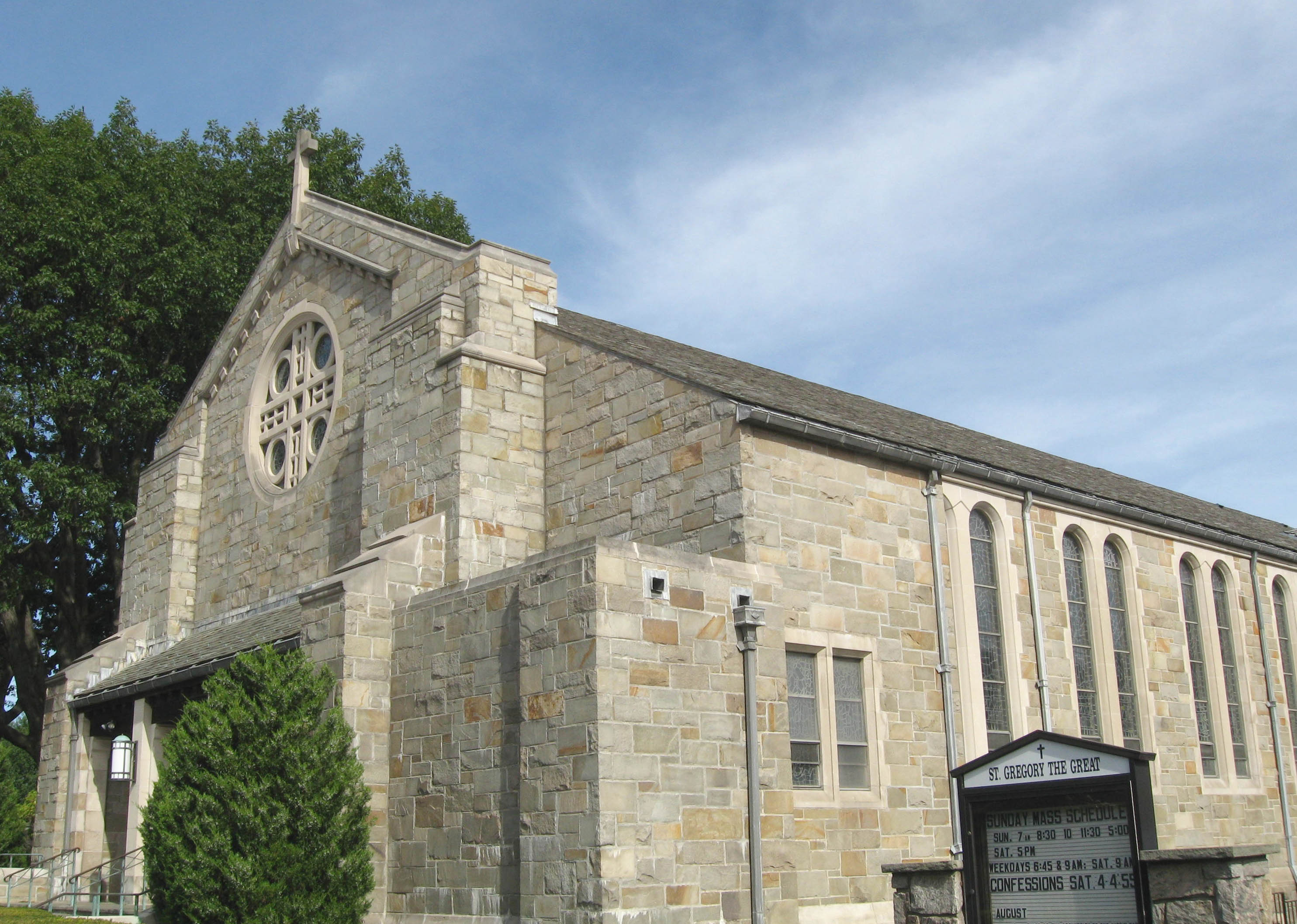
St. Gregory the Great Church

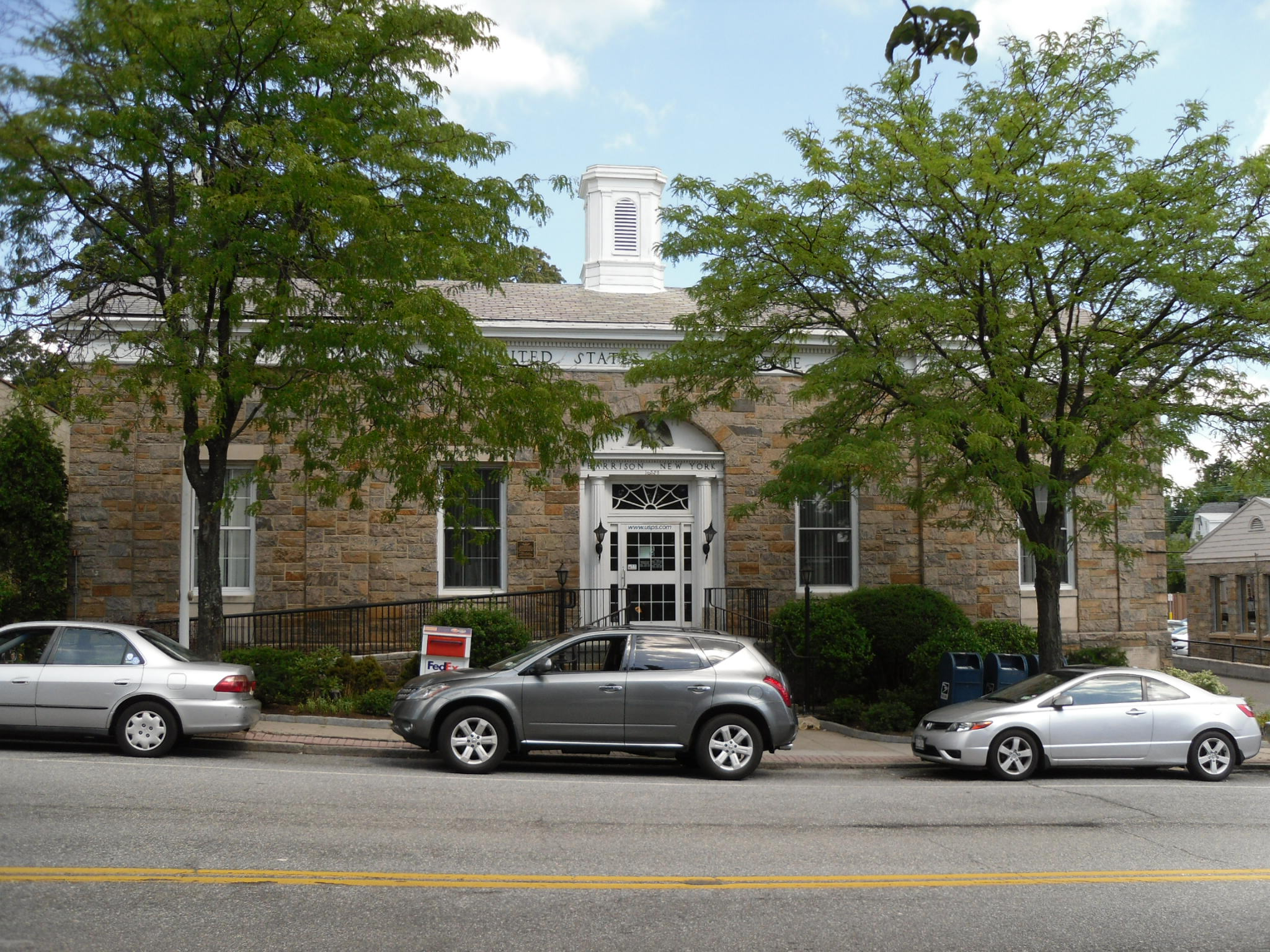
Post Office

Sites listed on the National Register of Historic Places include:

- The Hadden-Margolis House, a pre-revolutionary home originally constructed around 1750.
- Stony Hill Cemetery, an African-American burial ground used during the 19th century.
- The Post Office, a stone, Greek-revival building, featuring the Doric Order, built in 1938, and featuring a Works Progress Administration mural.

== Parks and recreation ==
- Westchester Country Club, a private golf club.

== Education ==
=== Public ===
Harrison Central School District operates Harrison High School, and Louis M. Klein Middle School, both located in the Downtown area. Additionally, the district also operates four public elementary schools. Purchase School serves Purchase and the northern section of West Harrison, Preston School serves the Silver Lake area of West Harrison, and Parsons School serves South Downtown. The fourth school, Harrison Avenue School, serves the remaining area of "Downtown", Sunnyridge, Sterling Ridge/The Trails, and The Brentwood.

=== Private ===
The Keio Academy of New York is a private high school located in Purchase.

=== Colleges and universities ===
Institutions of higher learning in Harrison include Manhattanville University, a private liberal arts university, and The State University of New York(SUNY) Purchase College, SUNY's college focusing in the fine and performing arts.

In 2008, Fordham University opened its Westchester campus in West Harrison.

Purchase College is named for the area of Harrison within which it is located, Purchase, New York, a Hamlet. Hamlets in New York State law are areas known by a traditional name, but which are not extant as any municipal government. Manhattanville University is named for its former location in Manhattanville, in New York City borough of Manhattan, where it was located at the time of its founding.

Manhattanville University is home to Reid Castle, a Gilded Age granite mansion, which, along with its grounds was donated to form the university campus. The historic mansion now serves as administrative offices and banqueting space.

== Infrastructure ==
=== Transportation ===
==== Roads and highways ====
- I-287 (Cross-Westchester Expressway)
- I-95 (New England Thruway)
- I-684
- Hutchinson River Parkway
- NY 120
- NY 120A
- NY 127

==== Bus ====
Harrison is served by Bee-Line Bus System.

==== Rail ====
Harrison is served by the New Haven Line of the Metro-North Railroad at the Harrison station.

==== Airport ====
Harrison is served by Westchester County Airport, which is located almost entirely in Purchase.

=== Fire department ===
Harrison is protected by one combination and two all-volunteer fire districts. The Harrison Fire Department being the combination department, the West Harrison Fire Department, and the Purchase Fire Department being all volunteer. The total fire apparatus amount in the town/village are three trucks, nine engines, two rescues, and many other special units. Altogether, there are four fire departments that protect Harrison.

On June 22, 2023, Harrison agreed to settle an employment discrimination lawsuit brought by the Justice Department. The $450,000 settlement is one of the largest payments by a municipality in an employment discrimination case brought by the United States on behalf of a single individual. The municipality and fire department also agreed to federal monitoring as part of the settlement for two years.

== Notable people ==
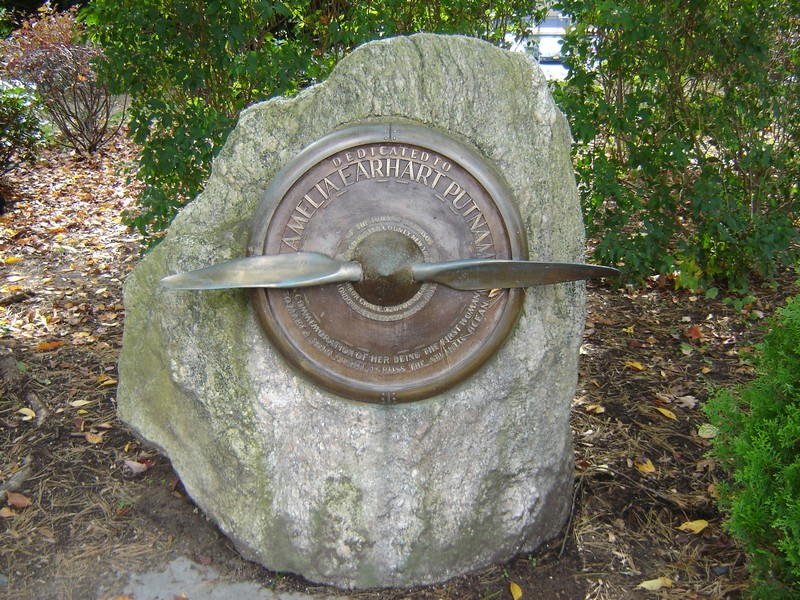
1932 memorial to Amelia Earhart, located in Harrison. (Note: "The memorial commemorated Earhart's record of being the first woman to fly solo across the Atlantic. (George Palmer Putnam at far right).")

- Drew Barrymore, American actress, producer, talk show host, and businesswoman, has owned a home in Harrison since 2024.
- Lou Bender (1910–2009), pioneer player with the Columbia Lions and in early pro basketball, who was later a successful trial attorney.
- Kenneth Cole (born 1954), fashion designer and entrepreneur
- Amelia Earhart (1897–1937), the aviator lived in Harrison in a home on what is now Amelia Earhart Lane off Locust Avenue while she was married to publisher George Putnam. A monument consisting of a bronze plaque with a propeller attached to a stone, was laid in a small park in Harrison after she became the first woman to fly solo across the Atlantic. (Note: "The Putnam home is in Harrison, but the garden juts across the line to Rye.")
- Tex Fletcher (1909–1987), a singing cowboy with credits as a recording artist, Broadway and movie actor, night club performer, and radio and television personality. (Note: "It turns out that Ol' Tex was born in Harrison, New York, and was christened Geremino Bisceglia by his Italian-immigrant parents.")
- Ralph Friedgen (born 1947), former head football coach at the University of Maryland from 2001 to 2010. (Note: "Born in Harrison, N.Y. His father, 'Big Ralph' Friedgen, had played football with Vince Lombardi at Fordham and was a high school coach.")
- Bobby Gonzalez, former men's basketball coach for the Seton Hall Pirates. (Note: "Former Seton Hall basketball coach Bobby Gonzalez pleaded not guilty yesterday to shoplifting a satchel at a shopping mall last month in New Jersey. Gonzalez spoke during his five-minute arraignment in Newark only to verify his address in Harrison, Westchester County.)"
- Fitzhugh Green, of Putnam's Publishing House.
- Louise Groody, musical star and actress, resided in Harrison beginning in 1928.
- Josh Hart, a basketball player for the New York Knicks, has lived in Harrison since 2024.
- Bobby Jordan (1923–1965), one of the Dead End Kids.
- Rick Marotta, drummer and composer of the theme song for Everybody Loves Raymond. (Note: "But perhaps the most important cue that Marotta took from his brother was when he followed those larger footsteps up to the attic of the family's house in Harrison.")
- John Mara, president, CEO, and the owner of the New York Giants, resides in Harrison.
- John McGillicuddy (1930–2009), CEO of Manufacturer's Hanover Trust and then, after its merger with Chemical Bank, its CEO in the 1990s. (Note: "John F. McGillicuddy, who assembled one of first big bank mergers in the wave of consolidation that emerged from the economic slump of the early 1990s, the one between Manufacturers Hanover and Chemical Bank, died on Sunday at his home in Harrison, N.Y.")
- George P. Putnam (1887–1950), publisher and husband of Amelia Earhart.
- Mariano Rivera (born 1969), pitcher with the New York Yankees. (Note: "Rivera lived in New Rochelle from 1996 to 1999 and now lives in Harrison.")
- Scott Rogowsky, host of HQ Trivia. (Note: "I was born in Mt. Sinai Hospital in Manhattan, raised in Harrison, New York, about 25 miles north in Westchester County", Rogowsky told HuffPost.)
- Alan Rosen (born 1969), restaurant and bakery owner, and author
- Brothers Eric and Jeff Rosenthal, the hip-hop sketch comedians collectively known as ItsTheReal.
- Gene Sarazen (1902–1999, born Eugenio Saraceni) American golfer. (Note: "He was born Eugenio Saraceni, the son of an Italian carpenter from Rome, Feb. 27, 1902, in Harrison, N.Y.")

== See also ==
- Greenwood Union Cemetery, Rye, New York
