= Damage waiver =

Optional damage insurance coverage

Damage waiver (DW) or, as it is often referred to, collision damage waiver (CDW) or loss damage waiver (LDW) is a term that can be included or purchased as an option in a car rental agreement, by which the rental company waives the right to pursue compensation from the renter if the vehicle is damaged or stolen. Although it involves a transfer of risk, a damage waiver option is not insurance but instead a modification to the basic rental contract.

In many countries, it is a legal requirement to have a damage waiver included in the basic car rental rate. Some rental companies also offer liability insurance and coverage of towing charges. Terms and prices vary. Alternatives to the CDW include other car insurance policies, some coverage from credit card issuers (Visa, MasterCard, American Express etc.) and some travel insurance.

== Risks addressed ==
=== Liability ===
If the car damages property or injures someone, the customer or other insurance must pay for the damages (i.e., is "held liable"). US car rental companies sometimes include minimum liability insurance required by law in the basic rental charge. Hertz includes it in all states except California, but will subrogate any damages against the driver (meaning the car is insured to the state minimum but the driver will pay for all damages paid by Hertz). Avis includes it in all states except California and Texas, at least for renters who lack their own coverage. Other companies do not publicize where they include liability insurance in the basic rental charge. Some car rental companies offer more liability insurance for a fee.

Within Canada, all auto rentals are required by law to include a minimum of $200,000 in third-party liability insurance, regardless of whether the renter has their own auto insurance or not. Most rental agencies thus do not provide a third-party liability insurance option, and simply factor in the premium as part of fixed cost of rental.

=== Collision, theft, other damage ===
When a customer does not pay the car rental company to waive damage, and a rented car is stolen, or damaged by accident, vandalism, weather (hail), etc., the customer or other insurance must pay to the rental company the full cost of repair, plus administrative charges and, in some states, loss of use. From some companies, in some states and countries, there are charges for towing, storage, impound, administrative fees and diminution of value of the car (Avis, Budget, National, Thrifty). Some companies even say they alone will decide the diminution (Dollar, Hertz").

The rental company's damage waiver normally covers accidental damage and towing a damaged vehicle, as long as the renter complies with the rental contract (such as authorized drivers, locations, no racing) and with the damage waiver (such as police report). Waivers may also cover theft, vandalism, loss of use, and liability. The renter often has a choice among different coverages for different fees.

Damage waivers are not necessarily complete. They may have deductibles (also called excess) and limits on the amount covered. Liability coverage always has limits.

The descriptions above come from rental company websites, under headings like Policies, FAQ, Coverage, or More.

Damage Waivers can be bought from the car rental company in most countries, or through a car hire excess insurer in the UK, or through travel insurers. Coverage from the car rental company may be required if the renter lacks proof of coverage elsewhere.

== Credit card coverage of damage waiver ==
=== Cards issued in the US ===
Some credit card issuers (Visa, MasterCard, etc.,) offer insurance for theft or damage to rented cars. A few of the cards (noted in the table below) offer "primary" insurance, so the driver does not need to file a claim with his or her personal insurance. More cards offer "secondary insurance." This means that if the renter has personal or business vehicle insurance with appropriate coverage, then that insurance will pay first. Then the credit card issuer will pay the primary insurance's deductible and will address any large claims above the primary insurance limit.

If the renter has no other vehicle insurance for the specific claim (no insurance at all, or not in the relevant country, or no collision insurance, etc.), the credit card company (if it offers coverage) will pay the whole amount, up to its limits.

All four credit card companies listed below cover collision damage with some of their cards. Visa and some MasterCards and American Express cards also cover theft, while other MasterCards and American Express cards include theft, vandalism, hitting a deer or chipping a window (sources at bottom of table).

Other issues important to some renters are that Visa and MasterCard only cover rental contracts of 15 days or less (not even the first 15 days of longer rentals). Some American Express and MasterCards are not useful on dirt or gravel roads, since they exclude "damage sustained on any surface, other than a bound surface such as concrete or tarmac".

MasterCard and Visa in the United States say they cover "Physical damage and/or theft", but an introductory paragraph for some MasterCards and all Visa cards limits this to "collision or theft," so vandalism and hail are excluded. It may be ambiguous whether deer impacts and glass chips are covered as "collisions." MasterCards from Bank of America and MBNA generally have a simpler opening paragraph, which leaves coverage in place for any physical damage.

Even among these brands, some cards lack coverage entirely, especially debit cards and cards with low credit limits. The AmEx Platinum Cash Rebate card, for example, has no coverage. Some MasterCard "Standard" cards lack coverage, while "Premier", "Gold" and "Platinum" cards vary in their coverage. Citi AAdvantage, Citi ThankYou, Citi Dividend or Citi CashReturns MasterCard-branded cards are notable for providing coverage worldwide without geographic exclusions, while most other MasterCard, Visa and American Express cards exclude coverage in Ireland, Israel, and Jamaica.

These schemes apply to cards issued in the US, Trinidad and Tobago, and apparently nowhere else. In addition, no credit card will cover a rental that is being billed to a third party, such as in the event that an insurance company is being directly billed for the rental.

The following table is an effort at a summary, though not guaranteed. Coverage is complex and changes periodically. Telephone staff do not know the changes. Formal insurance policies govern and are not easily available to cardholders, who are only given summaries, like the links below.

"Loss of use" and administration fees are often advertised as covered by credit cards. However, credit card companies pay these items only if the rental car company provides proof. If rental car company does not provide proof, there seems little reason for the renter to pay either.

== See also ==
- Vehicle insurance
