= IHQ =

IHQ may refer to:

- International Headquarters (disambiguation)
- iHQ (company)
