= The Purchase Independent =

Student newspaper from SUNY Purchase

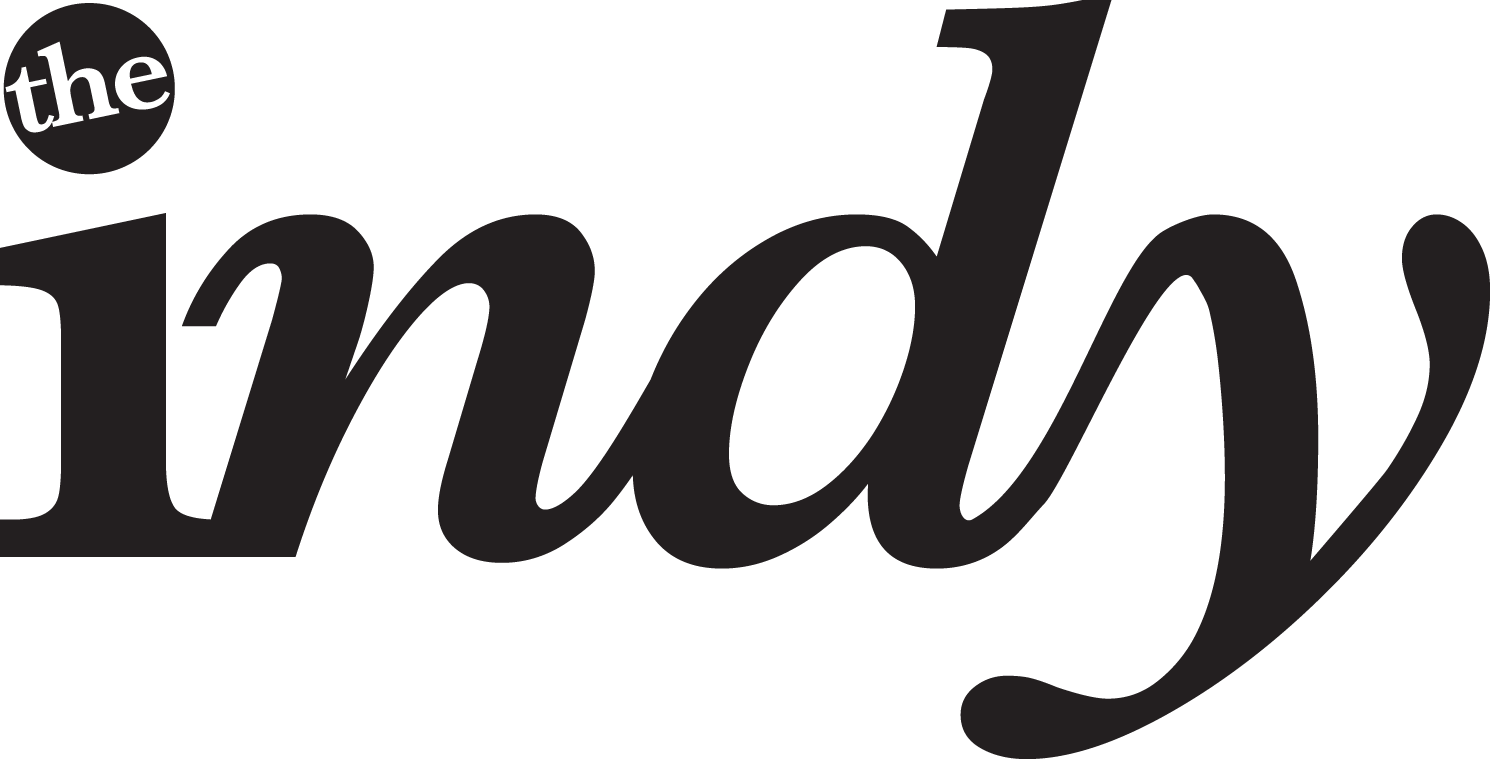
- Type: Weekly newspaper
- Format: Magazine
- Owner(s): Purchase Student Government Association
- Founded: 2001
- Headquarters: Purchase, New York, U.S.
- Circulation: 1,000
- Website: Purchase Indy

The Purchase Independent was established in 2001. Commonly referred to as "The Indy," it is a student newspaper at SUNY Purchase (The State University of New York at Purchase College), United States. It was funded by the Purchase Student Government Association through mandatory student activity fees. The paper was published weekly during the academic year and was distributed on Thursdays.

The paper is no longer published. The last issue was published on April 19, 2013 and is available on the paper's website. The paper's Facebook and Twitter accounts are not longer accessible.

== History ==
The Indy was founded in 2001 by Purchase student Glen Parker. Parker wanted to open an on-campus thrift store, but could not fund it through the Purchase Student Government Association (PSGA) due to rules about operating a business within the business of the PSGA. He could, however, use the profits from the thrift store to fund a student-run publication. At the time, The Purchase College Dispatch, operated by the Journalism department and open only to Journalism majors, was the only news source on campus.

Parker's joint venture combined the thrift store, The Independent Purchase, with the new newspaper, The Purchase Independent, forming I.P.P.I. In 2003-2004 the thrift store folded and the newspaper became separate, funded by the PSGA.

The 2012-2013 Executives were:

- Editor-in-chief: Róisín McCarty
- Layout editor: Melissa Foster
- Print/Web Manager: Hannah McCarty (formerly Thomas Roach)
