= Hadden-Margolis House =

Historic house in New York, United States

- U.S. National Register of Historic Places
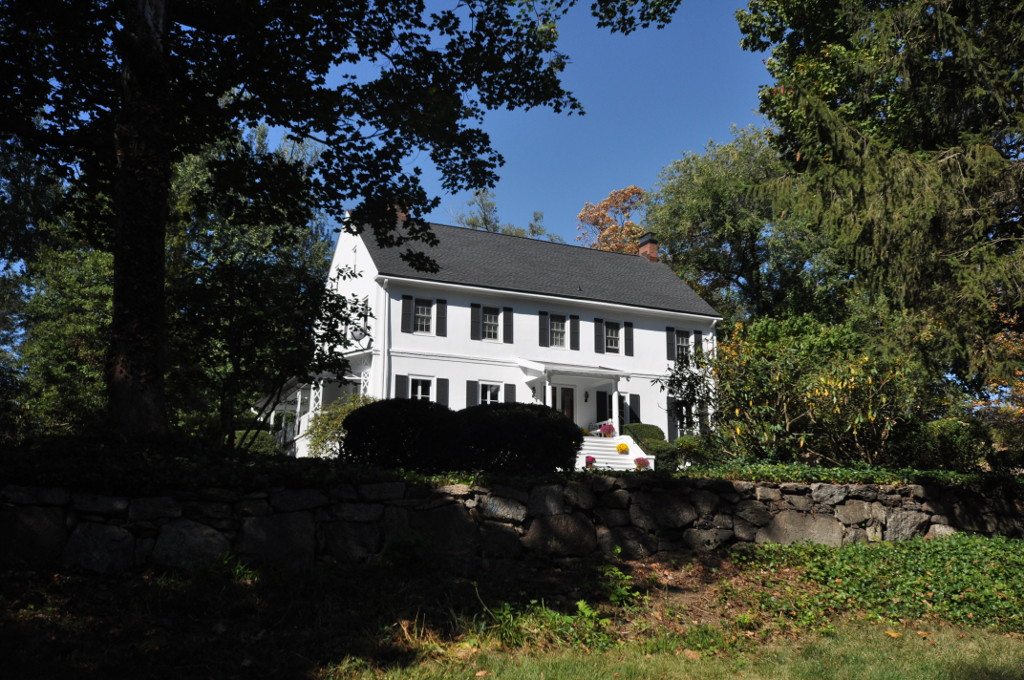

- Location within New York Location within the United States
- Location: 61 Winfield Ln., Harrison, New York
- Coordinates: 40°58′18.76″N 73°44′15.62″W
- Area: 1.2 acres (0.49 ha)
- Built: ca. 1750
- Architectural style: Colonial, Colonial Revival
- NRHP reference No.: 08000146
- Added to NRHP: March 7, 2008

Hadden-Margolis House is a historic home located at Harrison, Westchester County, New York. It was originally built about 1750 with later modifications in the 19th century in the Italianate style and early 20th century Colonial Revival style. It is a 2 1/2-story, center hall type dwelling covered in stucco over a heavy wood-frame structure. It has a stone foundation and straight pitched gable roof.

It was added to the National Register of Historic Places in 2008.

== See also ==
- National Register of Historic Places listings in southern Westchester County, New York
