= Harrison Central School District =

School district in the U.S. state of New York

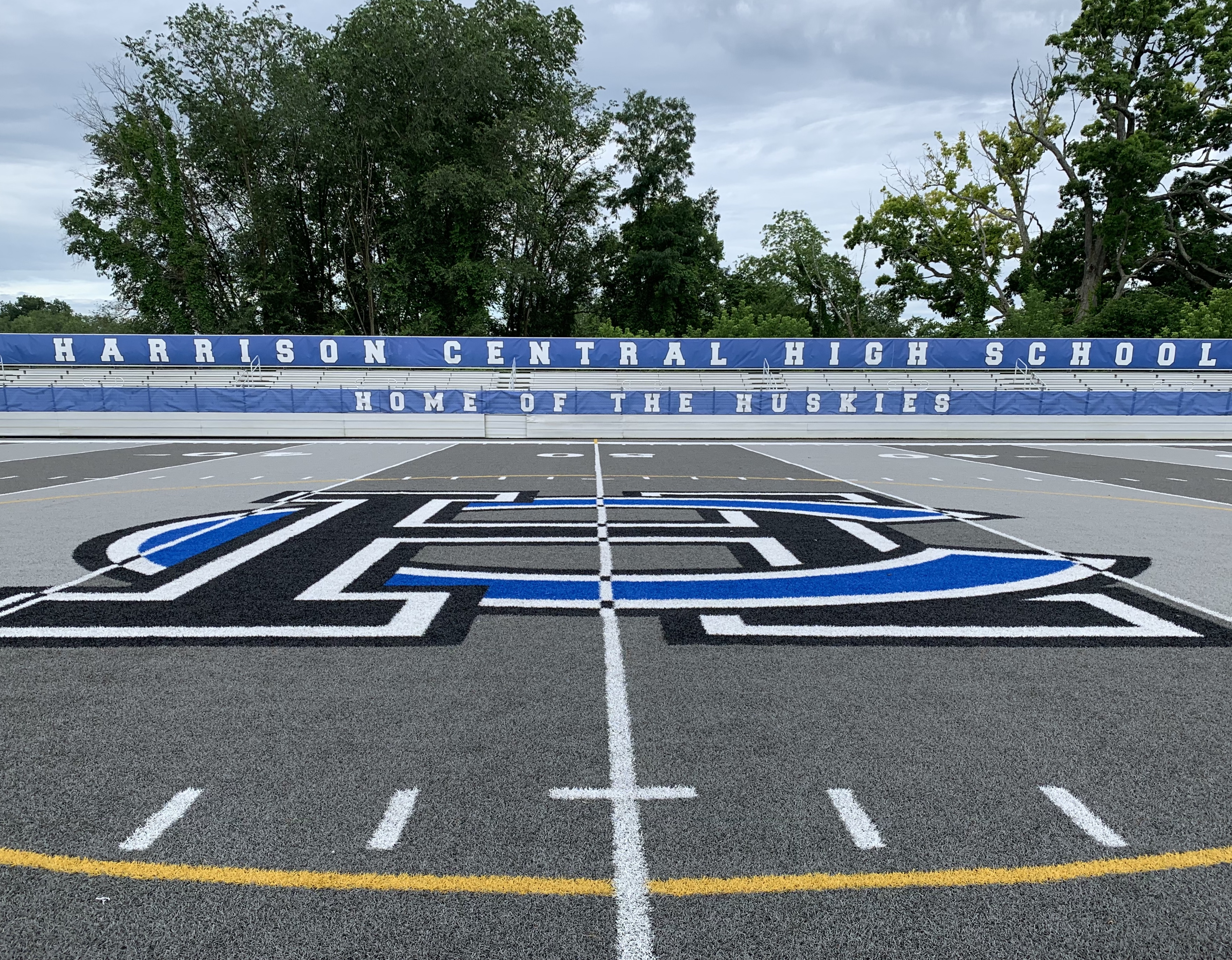
- Harrison Central High School athletic field

Location
- Harrison, NY, United States

District information
- Grades: K-12
- Established: 1854
- President: Kelly Kodak
- Vice-president: Kelly Mulvoy Mangan
- Superintendent: Louis N. Wool, Ed.D.

Students and staff
- Students: about 3760
- Student–teacher ratio: 10:1

Other information
- Website: www.harrisoncsd.org

Harrison Central School District is a public school district serving the town and village of Harrison, New York in Westchester County, New York. It operates one high school, Harrison High School, one middle school, Louis M. Klein Middle School and four elementary schools, Purchase, Parsons, Harrison Avenue School (HAS), and Prestons.

== Mission ==
“The Harrison Central School District embraces the core values of equity, access, rigor, and adaptability. The District engages students to think critically, resolve problems ethically, develop an understanding of the interconnected global society, and positively impact the world. Partnership among parents, community members, and educators is integral to the District’s commitment to enriching and empowering all children who learn in our schools.”

== History ==
The school district was established in the late nineteenth century as Union free School District No. 6, in conjunction with the neighboring town of Rye, New York. It has since severed ties with Rye, and now serves only residents of the town of Harrison, including the village of Harrison and Purchase, New York.

== Spirit ==
The mascot for teams of all sports and all ages is the Husky. The colors are maroon and white.

== Key personnel ==
- Superintendent: Dr.Louis N. Wool, Ed.D.
- President: Kelly Kodak
- Vice President: Kelly Mulvoy Mangan
- Trustees:
- Benjamin Blaustein
- Gabrielle Elfand
- Samantha Giberga
- Robert C. Sullivan, Jr.
- Jerome Valentin
