= Merit Janow =

American academic (born 1958)

Dean of School of International and Public Affairs, Columbia University
- In office July 1, 2013 – December 31, 2021
- Preceded by: Robert C. Lieberman
- Succeeded by: Thomas J. Christensen

Personal details
- Born: May 13, 1958 (age 68)
- Education: University of Michigan (BA); Columbia University (JD)
- Occupation: Scholar; administrator
- Website: Merit Janow

Merit E. Janow (born May 13, 1958) is an American lawyer who is a professor in the practice of international trade at Columbia University's School of International and Public Affairs, where she was dean from 2013 to 2021.

== Biography ==
Janow teaches graduate courses in international economic and trade policy at SIPA and international trade law and international antitrust at Columbia University Law School. Janow has also served on the WTO Appellate Body since November 2003. Since 1997 she has also been an executive director of a new international competition policy advisory committee to the attorney general and assistant attorney general for antitrust at the Department of Justice, Washington, D.C. From February 1990 through July 1993, she was deputy assistant U.S. trade representative for Japan and China at the Office of the U.S. Trade Representative. Her responsibilities within USTR included the development, coordination, and implementation of U.S. trade policy and negotiating strategy toward Japan and the People's Republic of China. Before joining USTR, Janow was an associate with the law firm of Skadden, Arps, Slate, Meagher and Flom, specializing in mergers and acquisitions and international corporate transactions. From 1980 to 1985, Janow was on the staff of the Hudson Institute, based initially in Tokyo and then in New York.

Janow received a BA from the University of Michigan and a JD from Columbia University Law School. She is a member of the Council on Foreign Relations, the National Committee on United States–China Relations, Asia Society, and the Japan Society, among others.

In 2009, she became a member of the International Advisory Council of the Chinese sovereign wealth fund China Investment Corporation. She is also an affiliated faculty member of the Weatherhead East Asian Institute.

From 2013 to 2021, she served as dean of Columbia University's School of International and Public Affairs.

In 2022, she was named Board Chair of the Japan Society. She is also Independent Chair of Mastercard.

== Selected publications ==
- "The Future of Competition Policy in the WTO" (Kluwer Law International 2003)
- Unilateral and Bilateral International Approaches to Competition Policy: Drawing on the Trade Experience (Brookings Trade Forum 1998)
- "Competition Policy and the WTO" in The Uruguay Round and Beyond, edited by Jagdish Bhagwati and Matthias Hirsch (University of Michigan Press 1999)
- "U.S. Trade Policy Towards Japan and China" in Trade Policies for a New Era (Council on Foreign Relations Press 1998)

== See also ==
- WTO
