= Purchase, New York =

Hamlet in Harrison, New York, United States

Purchase
- Hamlet
- Location of Purchase in New York state
- Coordinates: 41°2′26″N 73°42′52″W
- Country: United States
- State: New York
- County: Westchester
- Town: Harrison
- Named for: John Harrison's purchase

Area
  - Total: 6.6 sq mi (17 km^{2})

Population (2014)
  - Total: 5,391
  - Density: 820/sq mi (320/km^{2})
- Time zone: UTC−5 (Eastern (EST))
  - Summer (DST): UTC−4 (EDT)
- ZIP Codes: 10577

Purchase is a hamlet in the town of Harrison in Westchester County, New York, United States. One myth explains that its name is derived from Harrison's purchase, where John Harrison was to be granted as much land as he could ride in one day. Purchase is home to State University of New York at Purchase and Manhattanville College and is one of the richest communities on the east coast.

== History ==
In 1695, John Harrison, a Quaker from Flushing, Queens, "purchased of the Indians a tract of land about nine miles in length and nearly three in width..." The Indians reserved "such whitewood trees as shall be found suitable to make canoes of." Large numbers of Friends came to settle there. They called it "Harrison's Purchase", or simply "The Purchase", and it is still known today as Purchase, NY. A Quaker meeting house was erected there in 1727.

In 1967, 200 residents stated support for a plan to incorporate Purchase, so corporations could not build in the community. In response, officials from the Town of Harrison put forward plans to try to become a city in an attempt to stop Purchase from seceding from the Town of Harrison.

There are many historic sites located in Purchase. The grounds that SUNY Purchase now occupies was once Strathglass Farms, a dairy farm. The Quaker Friends Meeting house was founded in the 18th century. The original building fell victim to fire years ago, and the present one is an accurate reconstruction. Before the headquarters of Pepsi was built, the Blind Brook Polo Club was located on that site. Amelia Earhart flew her plane from the polo grounds. Many colonial-era homes and unspoiled natural woodlands have decreased in the last 30 years due to residential development.

The Old Oaks Country Club, originally named "Hill Crest", is a splendid mansion house built in the late 1880s by millionaire Trenor Luther Park and his wife Julia Catlin Park. Trenor Luther was a Harvard Graduate, who studied law, and a silk merchant. His father, Trenor William Park, funded the Panama Railway, ran for Vice President of the United States in 1864 and was involved with the California Gold Mines. Purchase is also known for being one of the richest areas in the country.

The Reid Hall, Manhattanville College was added to the National Register of Historic Places in 1974.

== Economy and business ==
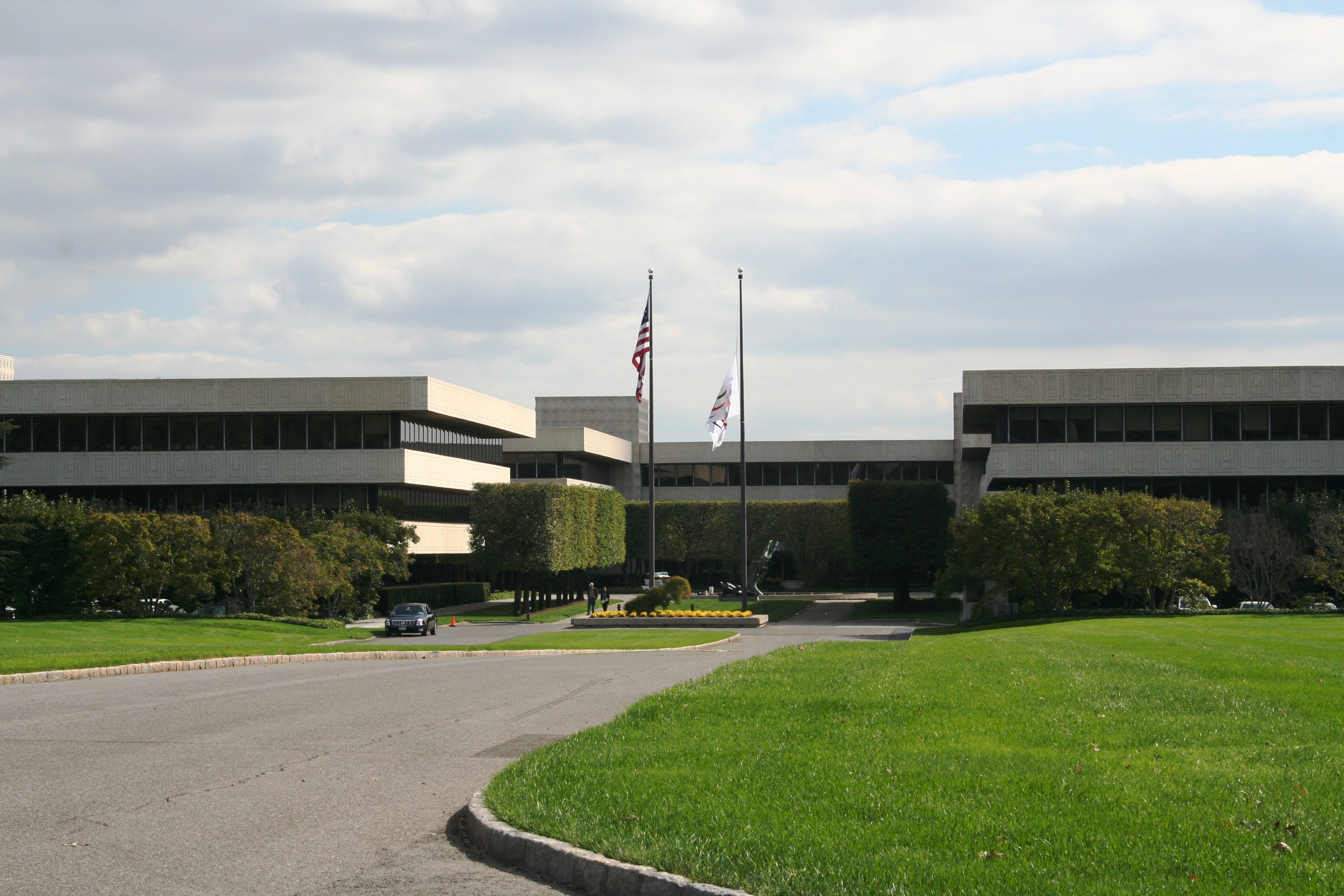
PepsiCo headquarters

Mastercard's headquarters, Mastercard International Global Headquarters; PepsiCo; and Central National-Gottesman are headquartered in Purchase. Pernod Ricard has offices in Purchase.

Lenovo maintained its U.S. headquarters in Purchase until 2006, when it announced its relocation to Morrisville, North Carolina.

The average household income in Purchase was estimated to be approximately $352,000 in 2010.

In 2018, Bloomberg ranked 10577 the fifth wealthiest ZIP Code in the United States.

The hamlet "was used to film a sizeable chunk of the second season" of The Sinner in summer 2018; one featured location is the Cobble Stone Restaurant.

In 2025, the median household income was reported as $976,200, and the average home price as over $1.5 million.

== Education ==
=== Public schools ===
Purchase School is the local K–5 elementary school, which is part of the Harrison Central School District. Harrison High School is the local high school, which offers the IB Diploma Programme, and which is the only high school operated by the Harrison Central School District. Harrison High School also serves the entire area of the Town of Harrison, including the Village of Harrison, which is economically diverse. In 2010, Superintendent of the Harrison Central School District, Louis N. Wool was named Superintendent of the Year in New York State.

=== Private schools ===
Keio Academy of New York, a Japanese international boarding school, is in Purchase.

=== Colleges and universities ===
Purchase is home to the State University of New York at Purchase and Manhattanville University, as well as the Westchester Campus of Fordham University, a private Jesuit research university. Keio University also operates a high school named Keio Academy of New York.

== Media and culture ==
Purchase is known for the Purchase Community House (PCH), home of the Purchase Day Camp (PDC). It also runs after-school activities during the rest of the year. On the PCH property, there are four pools and numerous playing fields. The Purchase Free Library is also located on the PCH property.

The Donald M. Kendall Sculpture Gardens at the PepsiCo headquarters and the Neuberger Museum of Art at Purchase College are two significant art collections found in the community.

During the 1980s, the city hosted the festival Pepsico Summerfare, known for their opera productions which included Benjamin Britten's Noye's Fludde (1981–84), David Eaton's The Cry of Clytaemnestra (1982), and Peter Sellars's Little Mahagonny/Cantata 60: Conversations with Fear and Hope After Death (1985), Peter Sellars's productions of Mozart's Così fan tutte (1986), Don Giovanni (1987) and Le nozze di Figaro (1988). Now, SUNY produces two operas each year.

The first annual meeting of the North American Vexillological Association was hosted in Purchase.

== Notable people ==
- Hassan Abbas, scholar and academic
- Skylar Brandt, ballet dancer
- Kenneth Cole, designer
- Eddy Curry, former NBA player
- James Badge Dale, actor
- Joe Girardi, former MLB player and manager
- Sunny Hostin, lawyer and TV host
- Alfred A. Knopf Sr., book publisher
- Mitski, musician who graduated from Purchase College (class of 2013)
- Indra Nooyi, business executive
- Alan Rosen (born 1969), restaurant and bakery owner, and author
- Scott Shannon, radio disc jockey
- Regina Spektor, who graduated from Purchase College (class of 2001)
- Sy Sternberg, business executive
- Herman Tarnower, cardiologist, author, and murder victim
- Tom Llamas, NBC news anchor
