= Mastercard =

American multinational financial services corporation

Mastercard Inc.
- Logo used since 2019 (Note: Symbol used since 2016)
- Type: Public
- Traded as: NYSE: MA (Class A); S&P 100 component; S&P 500 component
- ISIN: US57636Q1040
- Industry: Financial services
- Founded: 1966; 60 years ago
- Headquarters: 2000 Purchase Street, Purchase, New York, U.S.
- Area served: Worldwide
- Key people: Merit Janow (chair); Michael Miebach (CEO)
- Brands: Cirrus; Maestro; Mondex; Masterpass
- Services: Credit cards; Debit cards; Mobile payments; Payment systems
- Revenue: ▲US$32.8 billion (2025)
- Operating income: ▲US$18.9 billion (2025)
- Net income: ▲US$15 billion (2025)
- Total assets: ▲US$54.1 billion (2025)
- Total equity: ▲US$7.7 billion (2025)
- Number of employees: 39,800 (2025)
- Website: mastercard.com

Mastercard Inc. (stylized as MasterCard from 1979 to 2016 and as mastercard since 2016) is an American multinational payment card services corporation headquartered in Purchase, New York. It provides payment transaction processing and other related-payment services, including travel-related payments and bookings. Its principal business globally is to process payments between the banks of merchants and the card-issuing banks or credit unions of purchasers who use its branded debit, credit and prepaid cards to make purchases. Mastercard has been publicly traded since 2006.

Mastercard (originally Interbank, then Master Charge) was created by an alliance of several banks and regional bankcard associations in response to the BankAmericard issued by Bank of America, which later became Visa and remains its biggest competitor. Both companies have faced numerous antitrust lawsuits. Prior to its initial public offering, Mastercard Worldwide was a cooperative owned by the more than 25,000 financial institutions that issue its branded cards.

== History ==
=== 1958–1968: Founding ===
Although BankAmericard's debut in September 1958 was a failure, it began to turn a profit by May 1961. Bank of America kept this information secret and allowed widespread negative impressions to linger in order to ward off competition. This strategy was successful until 1966, when BankAmericard's profitability had become too big to hide. From 1960 to 1966, there were 10 new credit cards introduced in the United States, but from 1966 to 1968, approximately 440 credit cards were introduced by banks large and small throughout the country. These newcomers promptly banded together into regional bankcard associations.

At the time, sixteen states limited the ability of banks to operate through branch locations, and another fifteen states entirely prohibited branch banking and required unit banking. A unit bank can legally operate only at a single site, forcing it to remain very small. By joining a regional bankcard association, a unit bank could add a credit card to its financial products, and achieve economies of scale by outsourcing tedious back office tasks like card servicing to the association. Such associations also enabled unit banks to aggregate their customer bases and merchant networks in order to make a credit card useful for both customers and merchants; early credit cards had failed because they could only be used within a small radius around their respective issuing banks.

In 1966, Karl H. Hinke, an executive vice president at Marine Midland Bank, asked representatives of several other banks to meet him in Buffalo, New York. Marine Midland had just launched its own regional bankcard in the Upstate New York market after Bank of America declined its request for a BankAmericard regional license because Marine Midland was too big. The result of the Buffalo meeting was that several banks and regional bankcard associations agreed to join forces as Interbankard, Inc., which then became the Interbank Card Association (ICA). By the end of 1967, ICA had 150 members and Hinke became ICA's chairman. Bank of America eventually joined Mastercard as well.

The Interbank branding in 1966 consisted of a small unobtrusive lowercase 'i' inside a circle in the lower right-hand corner of the front of each Interbank card; the rest of the card design was the prerogative of each issuing bank. This tiny logo was unsatisfactory for creating nationwide brand awareness in order to compete against the established leader, BankAmericard. In 1969, Interbank developed a new brand, "Master Charge: The Interbank Card" by combining the two overlapping yellow and orange circles of the Western States Bankcard Association with the "Master Charge" name coined by the First National Bank of Louisville, Kentucky.

=== 1969–2005: International expansion ===
Also in 1969, First National City Bank joined Interbank and merged its proprietary Everything Card program with Master Charge.

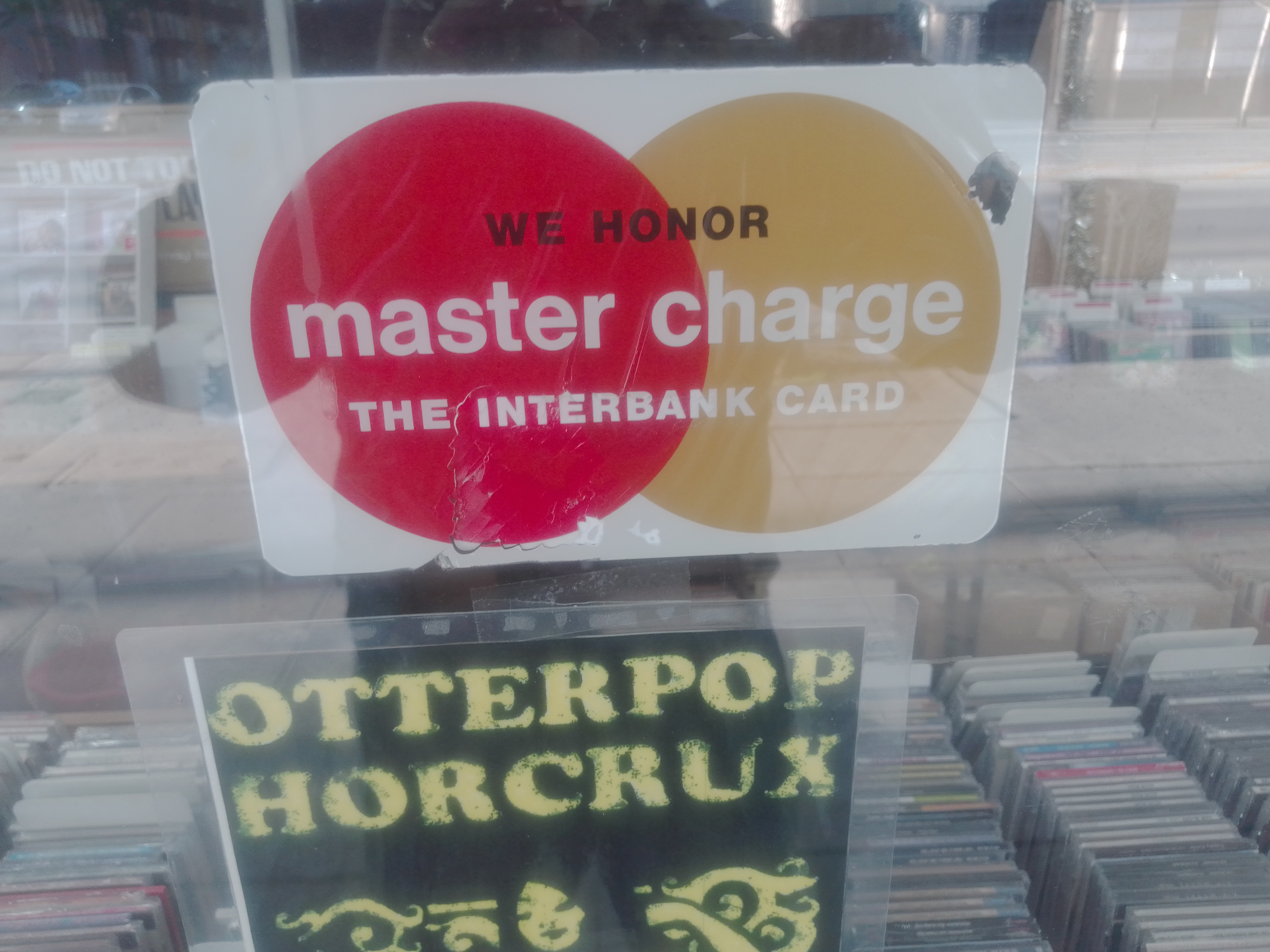
Master Charge decal in a store window in 2024 in Pasadena, California, United States

In 1979, Master Charge: The Interbank Card was renamed MasterCard. Beginning in 1980, the company rolled out new cards with a refreshed logo. Cards retained the overlapping red and yellow circles first adopted in 1969; subsequent card designs have continued to use this motif. In July 1983 the company became the first card-issuer to use holograms as part of its credit card security, with Visa following along 6 months later. Mastercard acquired the Cirrus network of automated tellers in 1985.

In 2002, MasterCard International merged with Europay International, another large credit-card issuer association, of which Eurocard had become a part in 1992. Mastercard became a Delaware corporation in connection with the merger, as well as in anticipation of an IPO.

=== 2006–2026: IPO, acquisitions, and further expansion ===
The company, which had been organized as a cooperative of banks, had an initial public offering on May 25, 2006, selling 61 million shares at $39 each. The stock is traded on the NYSE under the symbol MA, with a market capitalization of $434 billion as of April 2024. The deal was designed to maintain the value of the brand and minimise regulatory costs. In August 2010, Mastercard Worldwide, as it had been rebranded, expanded its e-commerce offering with the acquisition of DataCash, a UK-based payment processing and fraud/risk management provider. In March 2012, Mastercard announced the expansion of its mobile contactless payments program, including markets across the Middle East.

In 2014, Mastercard acquired Australian rewards program manager company Pinpoint for an undisclosed amount. In July 2016, Mastercard acquired 92.4% of VocaLink, a British company, for $920 million. In August 2017, Mastercard acquired Brighterion, a company with intellectual property in the areas of artificial intelligence and machine learning. Brighterion holds several patents. In 2017, Mastercard introduced a program using biometric cards where a fingerprint sensor is embedded with the payment card's secure chip, enabling cardholder authentication directly on the card. By 2025, Mastercard had extended its program to cards used by Eastern Bank in Bangladesh and Jordan Kuwait Bank in the Middle East.

In August 2019, Mastercard launched an offer to acquire part of the operations of Nets, a Scandinavian company, for €2.85 billion. In April 2021, Mastercard created a calculator that gathers information and measures the carbon footprints of customers to aid awareness of carbon emissions and global warming. The same month, Mastercard announced the acquisition of Ekata, a company specializing in identity verification, for $850 million. In March 2022, following the Russian invasion of Ukraine, Mastercard announced that it would suspend all business operations in Russia.

On November 17, 2023, the Chinese government approved the local bank card clearing license for a joint venture established by Mastercard in China. As of May 9, 2024, the joint venture can issue Mastercard bank cards that use the Chinese yuan for payment. In September 2024, Mastercard acquired cybersecurity company Recorded Future for $2.65 billion. In January 2026, Mastercard launched an Agentic AI suite called the Mastercard Agent Suite to help banks, retailers and other enterprises build, test, and deploy autonomous AI-driven workflows and agents. It is expected to be available in the second quarter of 2026. In March 2026, Mastercard announced its biggest digital currencies deal through the $1.8 billion acquisition of stablecoin infrastructure startup BVNK. BVNK was founded in 2021 and operates across 130 countries on all major blockchain networks.

=== Finances ===
As of 2026, Mastercard ranked 141 on the Fortune 500 list of the largest United States corporations by revenue.

Sales by region (2025)
Region	Sales in billion $	share
Asia Pacific, Europe, the Middle East and Africa	18.75	57%
Americas	14.04	43%

Development since 2005
Year	Revenue (US$ M)	Operating income (US$ M)	Share price (US$)	Employees
2005	2,938	393		4,300
2006	3,326	229	6.20	4,600
2007	4,068	1,108	13.65	5,000
2008	4,992	−534	20.33	5,500
2009	5,099	2,260	17.99	5,100
2010	5,539	2,752	22.01	5,600
2011	6,714	2,713	28.73	6,700
2012	7,391	3,937	41.58	7,500
2013	8,312	4,503	59.34	8,200
2014	9,441	5,106	75.33	10,300
2015	9,667	5,078	90.62	11,300
2016	10,776	5,761	94.50	11,900
2017	12,497	6,622	126.54	13,400
2018	14,950	7,282	186.16	14,800
2019	16,883	9,664	300.74	18,600
2020	15,301	8,081	370.00	21,000
2021	18,884	10,082	354.83	24,000
2022	22,237	12,264	347.73	29,900
2023	25,098	14,008	422.17	33,400
2024	28,167	15,582	524.23	35,300
2025	32,800	18,900	—	39,800

== Market power ==
Operating a payment processing network entails risk of engaging in anticompetitive practices due to the many parties involved (that is, the customer and their bank and the merchant and their bank). Few companies have faced more antitrust lawsuits both in the US and abroad.

=== United States ===
Mastercard, along with Visa, engaged in systematic parallel exclusion against American Express during the 1980s and 1990s. Mastercard used exclusivity clauses in its contracts and blacklists to prevent banks from doing business with American Express. Such exclusionary clauses and other written evidence were used by the United States Department of Justice in regulatory actions against Mastercard and Visa. Discover has sued Mastercard for similar issues. Both Mastercard and Visa have paid approximately $3 billion in damages resulting from a class-action lawsuit filed in January 1996 for debit card swipe fee price fixing. The litigation cites several retail giants as plaintiffs, including Wal-Mart, Sears, Roebuck & Co., and Safeway.

In 1996, four million merchants sued Mastercard in federal court for making them accept debit cards if they wanted to accept credit cards and dramatically increasing credit card swipe fees. This case was settled with a multibillion-dollar payment in 2003. This was the largest antitrust award in history. In 1998, the Department of Justice sued Mastercard over rules prohibiting their issuing banks from doing business with American Express or Discover. The Department of Justice won in 2001 and the verdict withstood appeal. American Express also filed suit. On August 23, 2001, Mastercard International Inc. was sued for violating the Florida Deceptive and Unfair Trade Practices Act. On November 15, 2004, Mastercard Inc. paid damages to American Express, due to anticompetitive practices that prevented American Express from issuing cards through U.S. banks, and paid $1.8 billion for settlement.

==== Swipe fee fixing and merchant discount bans ====
On November 27, 2012, a federal judge entered an order granting preliminary approval to a proposed settlement to a class-action lawsuit filed in 2005 by merchants and trade associations against Mastercard and Visa. The suit was filed due to alleged price-fixing practices employed by Mastercard and Visa. About one-fourth of the named class plaintiffs have decided to opt-out of the settlement. Opponents object to provisions that would bar future lawsuits and prevent merchants from opting out of significant portions of the proposed settlement.

Plaintiffs allege that Visa Inc. and Mastercard fixed interchange fees, also known as swipe fees, that are charged to merchants for the privilege of accepting payment cards. In their complaint, the plaintiffs also alleged that the defendants unfairly interfere with merchants from encouraging customers to use less expensive forms of payment such as lower-cost cards, cash, and checks. A settlement of $6.24 billion got preliminary approval in November 2019. A settlement of $5.54B was approved in 2019. Certain merchants appealed the settlement and were heard. The case is ongoing as of October 2022.

==== Antitrust settlement with U.S. Justice Department ====
In October 2010, Mastercard and Visa reached a settlement with the U.S. Justice Department in another antitrust case. The companies agreed to allow merchants displaying their logos to decline certain types of cards (because interchange fees differ), or to offer consumers discounts for using cheaper cards.

==== ATM operators ====
Mastercard, along with Visa, has been sued in a class action by ATM operators that claim the credit card networks' rules effectively fix ATM access fees. The suit claims that this is a restraint of trade in violation of federal law. The lawsuit was filed by the National ATM Council and independent operators of automated teller machines. More specifically, it is alleged that Mastercard's and Visa's network rules prohibit ATM operators from offering lower prices for transactions over PIN-debit networks that are not affiliated with Visa or Mastercard. The suit says that this price-fixing artificially raises the price that consumers pay using ATMs, limits the revenue that ATM operators earn, and violates the Sherman Act's prohibition against unreasonable restraints of trade. Johnathan Rubin, an attorney for the plaintiffs said, "Visa and Mastercard are the ringleaders, organizers, and enforcers of a conspiracy among U.S. banks to fix the price of ATM access fees in order to keep the competition at bay."

==== Merchant costs related to fraudulent card uses ====
In October 2025, merchants agreed to a $231.7 million settlement before a U.S. District Judge, as B & R Supermarket, Inc., et al v. Visa, Inc. et al, for costs imposed in frauds related to counterfeit, lost, or stolen cards, with Mastercard paying $79.8 million of the settlement.

=== Oceania ===
In 2003, the Reserve Bank of Australia required that interchange fees be dramatically reduced, from about 0.95% of the transaction to approximately 0.5%. One notable result has been the reduced use of reward cards and increased use of debit cards. Australia also prohibited the no surcharge rule, a policy established by credit card networks like Visa and Mastercard to prevent merchants from charging a credit card usage fee to the cardholder. A surcharge would mitigate or even exceed the merchant discount paid by a merchant, but would also make the cardholder more reluctant to use the card as the method of payment. Australia has also made changes to the interchange rates on debit cards and has considered abolishing interchange fees altogether. As of November 2006, New Zealand was considering similar actions, following a Commerce Commission lawsuit alleging price-fixing by Visa and Mastercard. In New Zealand, merchants pay a 1.8% fee on every credit card transaction.

=== Europe ===
The European Union has repeatedly criticized Mastercard for monopolistic trade practices. In April 2009, Mastercard reached a settlement with the European Union in an antitrust case, promising to reduce debit card swipe fees to 0.2 percent of purchases. In December 2010, a senior official from the European Central Bank called for a break-up of the Visa/Mastercard duopoly by the creation of a new European debit card for use in the Single Euro Payments Area (SEPA).

WikiLeaks published documents showing that American authorities lobbied Russia to defend the interests of Visa and Mastercard. In response, Mastercard blocked payments to WikiLeaks. Members of the European Parliament expressed concern that payments from European citizens to a European corporation could apparently be blocked by the United States and called for a further reduction in the dominance of Visa and Mastercard in the European payment system.

In 2013, Mastercard was under investigation by the European Union for the high fees it charged merchants to accept cards issued outside the EU, compared to cards issued in the EU, as well as other anti-competitive practices that could hinder electronic commerce and international trade, and high fees associated with premium credit cards. The EU's competition regulator said that these fees were of special concern because of the growing role of non-cash payments. Mastercard was banned from charging fees on cross-border transactions conducted wholly within the EU via a ruling by the European Commission in 2007. The European Commission said that its investigation also included large differences in fees across national borders. For instance, a €50 payment might cost €0.10 in the Netherlands but eight times that amount in Poland. The Commission argues that Mastercard rules that prohibit merchants from enjoying better terms offered in other EU countries may be against antitrust law. The European Consumer Organisation (BEUC) praised the action against Mastercard. In April 2013, BEUC said interbank fees push up prices and hurt consumers. BEUC Director General Monique Goyens said, "So in the end, all consumers are hit by a scheme which ultimately rewards the card company and issuing bank."

In January 2019, the European Commission imposed an antitrust fine of €570,566,000 on Mastercard for "obstructing merchants' access to cross-border card payment services", due to Mastercard's rules obliging acquiring banks to apply the interchange fees of the country where a retailer was located. The Commission concluded that Mastercard's rules prevented retailers from benefitting from lower fees and restricted competition between banks cross border, in breach of EU antitrust rules. The infringement of antitrust rules ended when Mastercard amended its rules due to the entering into force of the Interchange Fee Regulation in 2015, which introduced caps on interchange fees. The Commission did grant Mastercard a 10% reduction of the fine however, in return for Mastercard acknowledging the facts and cooperating with the antitrust investigation.

In February 2021, following an investigation by the British Payment Systems Regulator, Mastercard admitted liability for breaching competition rules in relation to pre-paid cards. In November 2024, the European Commission launched a further investigation into whether the scheme fees imposed by Visa and Mastercard impact negatively on retailers. Some retailers had in recent years complained about the fees, citing a lack of transparency. The Commission took its investigation further in June 2025, asking for a retailer view and for comments from the card operators about whether "a standardized summary of fees" would help to promote transparency. In November 2025, Mastercard announced its expansion in Europe with the creation of new hubs in Warsaw and Gdańsk, Poland.

== Other issues ==
=== United States internet gambling transactions ===
Mastercard, Visa, and other credit cards have been used to fund accounts since online gambling began in the mid-1990s. On March 20, 2000, the United States District Court for the Eastern District of Louisiana, reviewed motions in Re: MasterCard International Inc. regarding multi-district litigation alleging Mastercard illegally interacted with a number of internet casinos. The plaintiffs alleged, among other claims, that Mastercard had violated the Federal Wire Act. They sought financial relief for losses suffered at online gambling sites outside the United States.

The District Court's ruling on February 23, 2001, later upheld by the United States Court of Appeals for the Fifth Circuit, sided with Mastercard. The Fifth Circuit also clarified the application of the Wire Act to illegal online gambling. The Court determined that the wire act only applied to gambling activities related to a "sporting event or contest". Therefore, the court could not conclude that Mastercard had violated the Wire Act.

When PASPA was overturned May 14, 2018, Mastercard had to provide new guidance to its member banks. It clarified that state location restrictions apply to the individual placing the wager, not the member bank processing the transaction. According to various state gaming laws, sports betting providers must use Internet geolocation to determine a customer's physical location prior to accepting a wager. The Independent Community Bankers of America specifically requested information about a new online gambling merchant category code. Mastercard has dedicated MCC 7801 to online gambling. This code is distinct from 7800 for government owned lotteries and 7802 for government licensed horse and dog tracks.

=== Blocking payments to WikiLeaks ===
In December 2010, Mastercard blocked all payments to whistleblowing platform WikiLeaks due to claims that it engages in illegal activity. In response, a group of online activists Anonymous organized a denial-of-service attack; as a result, the Mastercard website experienced downtime on December 8–9, 2010. On December 9, 2010, the servers of Mastercard underwent a massive attack as part of an Operation Avenge Assange for closing down payments to WikiLeaks. The security of thousands of credit cards was compromised during that attack due to a phishing-site set up by the attackers. However, Mastercard denied this, stating that account data had "not been placed at risk". WikiLeaks' spokesman said, "We neither condemn nor applaud these attacks." U.N. High Commissioner for Human Rights Navi Pillay said that closing down credit lines for donations to WikiLeaks "could be interpreted as an attempt to censor the publication of information, thus potentially violating WikiLeaks' right to freedom of expression".

In July 2011, Iceland-based IT firm DataCell, the company that enabled WikiLeaks to accept credit and debit card donations, said it would take legal action against Visa Europe and Mastercard, and that it would move immediately to try to force the two companies to resume allowing payments to the website. Earlier on December 8, 2010, DataCell's CEO Andreas Fink had stated that "suspension of payments towards WikiLeaks is a violation of the agreements with their customers." On July 14, 2011, DataCell announced it had filed a complaint with the European Commission claiming the closure by Visa and Mastercard of Datacell's access to the payment card networks violated the competition rules of the European Community.

On July 12, 2012, a Reykjavík court ruled that Valitor, Visa and Mastercard's partner in Iceland, had to start processing donations within fourteen days or pay daily fines to the amount of ISK 800,000 (some $6000) for each day after that time, to open the payment gateway. Valitor also had to pay DataCell's litigation costs of ISK 1,500,000.

=== Corporate branding of all Nigerian identity cards ===
In 2014, pursuant to an agreement between Mastercard and the Nigerian Government, acting through the National Identity Management Commission, the new Nigerian ID cards bear the Mastercard logo, contain personal database data and double as payment cards, irrevocably linking such payments to the individuals, sparking criticism by the Civil Rights Congress alleging that it "represents a stamped ownership of a Nigerian by an American company ... reminiscent of the logo pasted on the bodies of African slaves transported across the Atlantic".

=== Selling of credit card data ===
In 2018, Bloomberg News reported that Google had paid millions of dollars to Mastercard for its users' credit card data for advertising purposes. The deal had not been publicly announced.

=== Regulatory ban in India ===
On July 14, 2021, the Reserve Bank of India (RBI) indefinitely barred Mastercard from issuing new debit or credit cards to domestic Indian customers starting July 22, 2021, for violating data localization and storage rules as set by RBI on April 6, 2018, under Payment and Settlement Systems Act, 2007 (PSS Act). This ban does not affect cards already issued and working in India. Mastercard is the third major payment systems provider to be restricted in India after American Express and Diners Club International. On June 16, 2022, the business restrictions imposed were lifted by RBI with immediate effect.

=== Regulatory ban in Vietnam ===
In 2018, the State Bank of Vietnam (SBV) requested that banks temporarily halt the issuance of new Mastercard cards due to violations of international payment regulations. Specifically, Mastercard did not comply with the regulation of conducting payments through the National Payment Corporation of Vietnam (NAPAS). In 2020, the ban was lifted after Mastercard committed to complying with Vietnamese regulations. Despite its widespread acceptance, using Mastercard in Vietnam still comes with certain limitations: Some Vietnamese websites and applications do not accept Mastercard as a payment method. Not all ATMs in Vietnam allow cash withdrawals using Mastercard. Some Mastercard users in Vietnam have reported experiencing inadequate customer service.

=== Adult content restrictions ===
In December 2020, Mastercard barred the use of its credit cards on Pornhub, an online pornography site. In April 2023, The Hill reported on an update to Mastercard's policy for adult content that would require sellers to have age and identity verifications and content review prior to posting in place. The new policies took effect in October 2021. On August 30, 2023, the American Civil Liberties Union, in combination with a coalition of other organizations, filed a complaint with the Federal Trade Commission requesting an investigation into the policy as an unfair business practice under Section 5 of the FTC Act. Mastercard faced further backlash in 2025 for pressuring video game digital distribution sites such as Steam and Itch.io into cracking down on adult content following pressure from activist group Collective Shout. Mastercard initially denied that it was doing so, but Valve, the developer of Steam, said that the company "specifically cited" Mastercard rule 5.12.7, which prohibits "any Transaction that is illegal, or in the sole discretion of the Corporation, may damage the goodwill of the Corporation or reflect negatively on the Marks", including that which is "patently offensive and lacks serious artistic value... or any other material that the Corporation deems unacceptable to sell in connection with a Mark".

== Products ==
Depending on the geographical location, Mastercard issuers can issue cards in tiers, from the lowest to the highest:

Credit cards:

- Traditional/Classic/Standard
- Gold/Titanium
- Diamond
- Platinum
- World
- World Rewards
- World Black Edition
- Black
- World Elite
- World Legend

Debit cards:

- Traditional/Classic/Standard
- Gold/Titanium
- Diamond
- Platinum
- World
- World Black Edition
- Black
- World Elite

Through a partnership with an Internet company that specializes in personalized shopping, Mastercard introduced a Web shopping mall on April 16, 2010, that it said can pinpoint with considerable accuracy what its cardholders are likely to purchase. In September 2014, Mastercard worked with Apple to incorporate a new mobile wallet feature into Apple's new iPhone and Apple Watch models known as Apple Pay, enabling users to more readily use their Mastercard, and other credit cards.

In May 2020, Mastercard announced the Mastercard Track Business Payment Service. The service will provide business-to-business payments between buyers and suppliers. According to the head of global commercial products, it "creates a directory of suppliers, enabling suppliers to publish their payment rules so they can better control how they receive payments while making it easier for buyers to find suppliers and understand their requirements". On February 10, 2021, Mastercard announced its support of cryptocurrencies saying that later in 2021, Mastercard will start supporting select cryptocurrencies directly on its network. One of the main focus areas that Mastercard wants to support is using digital assets for payments, and that crypto assets will need to offer the stability people need in a vehicle for spending, not investment. In October 2021, Mastercard announced that through its partnership with Bakkt, any bank or merchant on its network would soon be able to offer crypto services. In June 2022, Mastercard announced that it would now be allowing cardholders to purchase NFTs via various NFT scaling platforms.

=== Prepaid debit cards ===
Mastercard, Comerica Bank, and the U.S. Treasury Department teamed up in 2008 to create the Direct Express Debit Mastercard. The federal government uses the Express Debit product to issue electronic payments to people who do not have bank accounts. Comerica Bank is the issuing bank for the debit card. The Direct Express cards give recipients a number of consumer protections. In June 2013, Mastercard announced a partnership with British Airways to offer members the Executive Club Multi-currency Cash Passport, which will allow members to earn extra points and make multi-currency payments. The Passport card allows users to load up to ten currencies (euro, pound, U.S. dollar, Turkish lira, Swiss franc, Australian dollar, Canadian dollar, New Zealand dollar, U.A.E. dirham, and South African rand) at a locked-in rate. When used, the card selects the local currency to ensure the best exchange rate, and if the local currency is not already loaded onto the card, funds are used from other currencies.

=== QkR ===
QkR is a mobile payment app developed by Mastercard operating in the US and Australia for the purpose of ordering products and services through a smartphone with payments charged to the associated credit card. It is being deployed for use in large-scale events, such as sport events, concerts, movie theaters or schools. Unlike other Mastercard mobile payment apps such as Pay Pass, QkR does not use NFC from the phone, but rather an Internet connection. Users can open the app, scan a QR code located on the back of the seat in front of them, and place orders for refreshments of their choice. The order is dispatched to a nearby concession stand. QkR is being marketed to vendors as a replacement for other mobile payment apps and a mobile ordering app, either distributed by the vendor (such as Starbucks's app, McDonald's' app, or Chipotle's mobile ordering app) or by a third party, such as Square, headed by Twitter cofounder Jack Dorsey.

=== Mastercard Contactless ===

Mastercard Contactless (formerly PayPass) is an EMV-compatible, contactless payment feature similar to American Express' ExpressPay, and Visa payWave. All three use the same symbol as shown on the right. It is based on the ISO/IEC 14443 standard that provides cardholders with a simpler way to pay by tapping a payment card or other payment device, such as a phone or key fob, on a point-of-sale terminal reader rather than swiping or inserting a card. Contactless can currently be used on transactions up to and including 100 GBP, 50 EUR, 60 BAM, 80 CHF, 50 USD, 100 CAD, 200 SEK, 500 NOK, 100 PLN, 350 DKK, 80 NZD, 100 AUD, 1000 RUB, 500 UAH, 500 TRY depending on the card's currency rather than the transaction currency or 5000 INR.

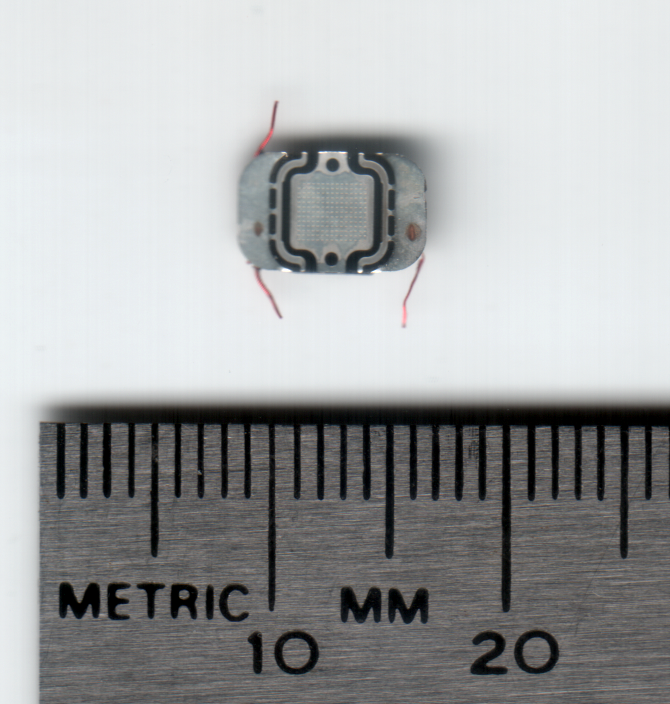
PayPass RFID chip

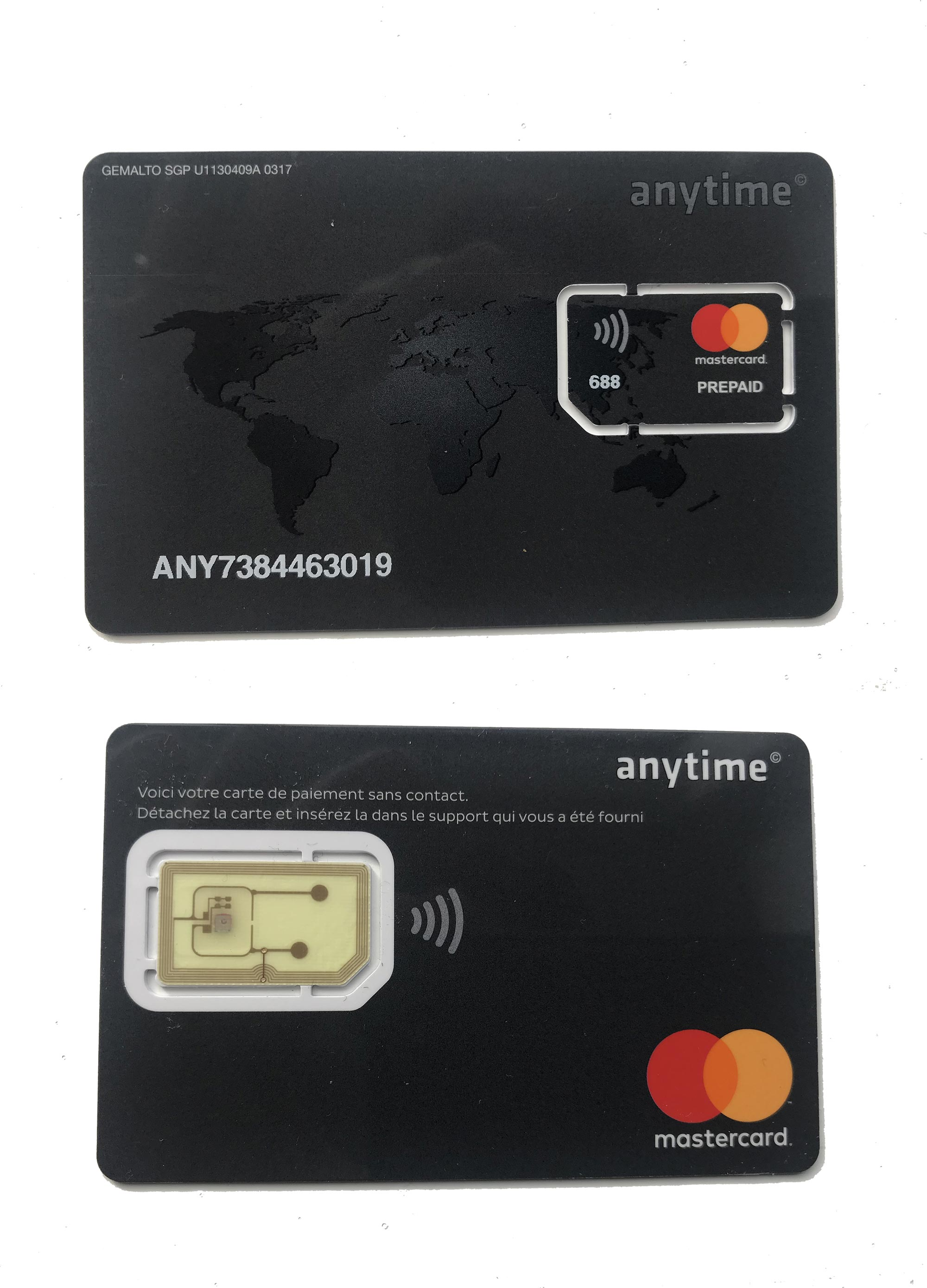
Holder with a miniature prepaid contactless payment card of the French neobank anytime

In 2003, Mastercard concluded a nine-month PayPass market trial in Orlando, Florida, with JPMorgan Chase, Citibank, and MBNA. More than 16,000 cardholders and more than 60 retailer locations participated in the market trial. In addition, Mastercard worked with Nokia and the Nokia 6131, AT&T Wireless, and JPMorgan Chase to incorporate Mastercard PayPass into mobile phones using near-field communication technology, in Dallas, Texas. In 2011, Google and Mastercard launched Google Wallet, an Android application which allows a mobile device to send credit/debit card information directly to a PayPass-enabled payment terminal, bypassing the need for a physical card, up until the creation of Google Pay. In 2014, the Apple released Apple Pay for iOS devices.

During late 2015, Citicards in the US stopped issuing PayPass-enabled plastic, but the keyfob was still available upon request. Effective July 16, 2016, Citicards stopped supporting PayPass completely. While existing plastic and keyfobs continued to work until their expiration date, no new PayPass-enabled hardware was issued to US customers after that date.

=== Crypto ===
In April 2023, Mastercard announced its intention to expand its partnerships with cryptocurrency firms. At the time of the announcement, the firm had already partnered with other financial companies to offer cards linked to crypto in some nations. This was despite an increasingly intense regulatory environment, and it followed rival company Visa stopping its agreement with FTX in November 2022. The company said its Mastercard Crypto Credential service would allow for transactions between countries that met requirements like so-called "travel rule" by the Financial Action Task Force (FATF), using technology from CipherTrace. It also worked with wallet providers Bit2Me, Lirium, Mercado Bitcoin, and Uphold. Its head of crypto and blockchain, Raj Dhamodharan, said uses for NFT transactions would come later on.

== Branding ==
1969–1979, featuring the original Interbank logo of 1966

1979–1990

1990–1996

1996–2016

2016–2019

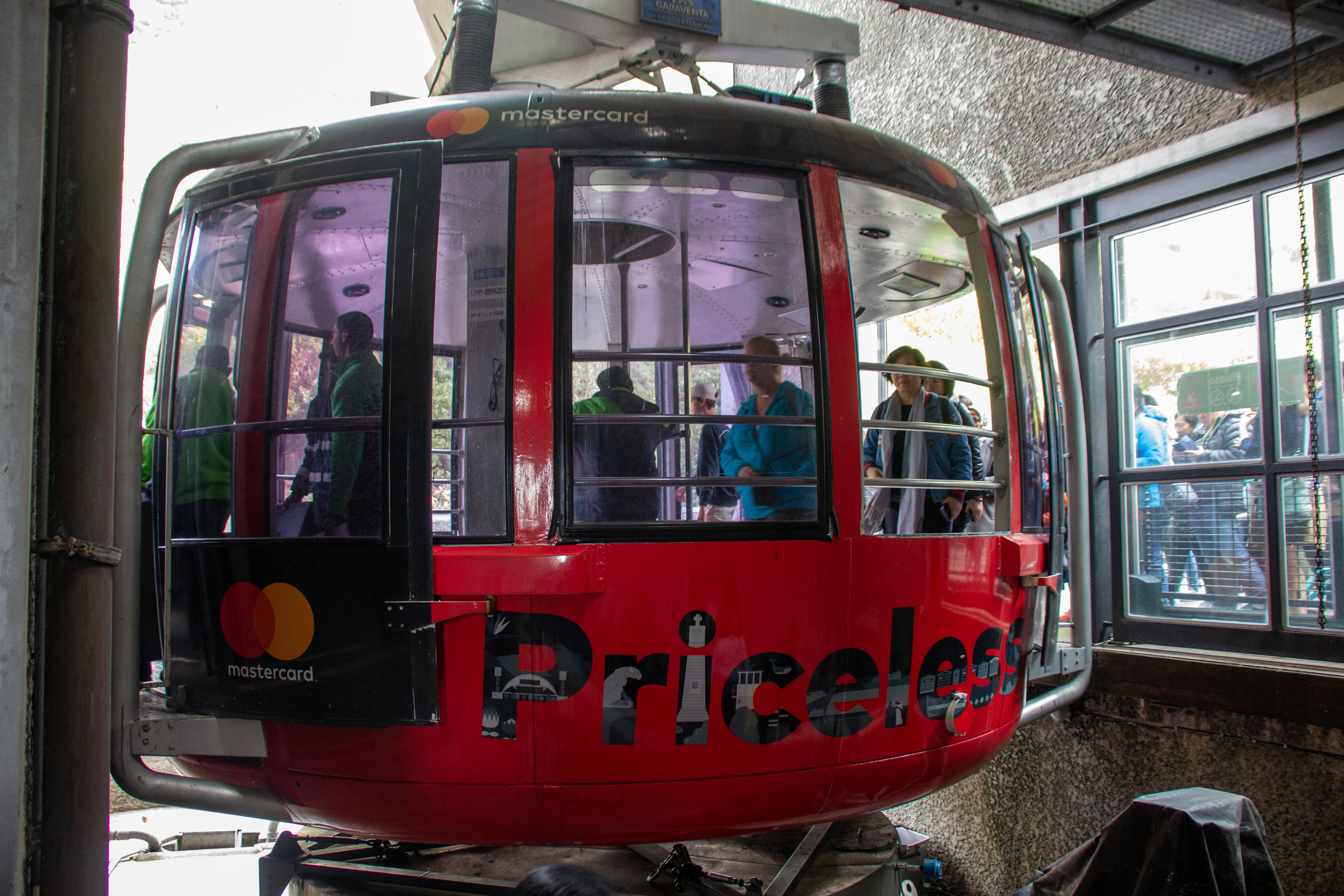
Table Mountain cablecar, 2018

Antitrust litigation over the years has damaged the brand. Mastercard's current advertising campaign tagline is Priceless. It started in 1997. The slogan associated with the campaign is There are some things money can't buy. For everything else, there's Mastercard. The Priceless campaign in more recent iterations has been applicable to both Mastercard's credit card and debit card products. They also use the Priceless description to promote products such as their priceless travel site, which features deals and offers for Mastercard holders, and priceless cities, offers for people in specified locations.

In mid-2006, MasterCard International changed its name to MasterCard Worldwide. This was to suggest a more global scale. In addition, the company introduced a new corporate logo adding a third circle to the two that had been used in the past (the familiar card logo, resembling a Venn diagram, remained unchanged). A new corporate tagline was introduced at the same time—The Heart of Commerce.

In July 2016, Mastercard introduced its new rebranding, along with a new corporate logo. In addition, it changed its service name from "MasterCard" to "mastercard". In January 2019, Mastercard removed its name from its logo, leaving just the overlapping discs. In 2021, Mastercard was ranked number 13 on Morning Consult's list of most trusted brands.

=== Sports sponsorships ===
Mastercard sponsors major sporting events and teams throughout the world. These include rugby's New Zealand, the MLB, the UEFA Champions League and the PGA Tour's Arnold Palmer Invitational. Previously, it also sponsored the FIFA World Cup but withdrew its contract after a court settlement and its rival, Visa, took up the contract in 2007. It also partners the Brazil national football team and the Copa Libertadores.

In 1997, Mastercard was the title sponsor of the Mastercard Lola Formula One team, which withdrew from the 1997 season due to financial problems having failed to qualify its first race. The team also sponsored Jordan Grand Prix from the 1998 season through to end of the 2001 season. In July 2024, Mastercard returned to Formula One after signing a multi-year sponsorship deal with McLaren. In August 2025, McLaren announced Mastercard as the team's official naming partner and entered the 2026 season onwards as McLaren Mastercard Formula 1 Team.

Mastercard was the title sponsor for the Alamo Bowl game from 2002 until 2005. In late 2018, Mastercard became the first major sponsor for League of Legends esports. The company sponsors the League of Legends World Championship, Mid-Season Invitational, and the All-stars event for League of Legends. Until 2018, Mastercard was the sponsor of the Memorial Cup, the CHL's annual championship between its three leagues. In September 2022, Mastercard acquired the title sponsorship rights for all international and domestic home matches organized by the Board of Cricket Control in India.

== Corporate affairs ==
Mastercard is a public company traded on the New York Stock Exchange under the ticker symbol MA. The company is headquartered at the Mastercard International Global Headquarters in Purchase, New York. It is a component of the S&P 500 and S&P 100. The company is governed by a board of directors, chaired by Merit Janow. Michael Miebach is chief executive officer.

== Banknet ==
Mastercard operates Banknet, a global telecommunications network linking all Mastercard card issuers, acquirers, and data processing centers into a single financial network. The operations hub is located in St. Louis, Missouri. Banknet uses the ISO 8583 protocol. Mastercard's network differs significantly from Visa's. Visa's is a star-based system where all endpoints terminate at one of several main data centers, where all transactions are processed centrally. Mastercard's network is an edge-based, peer-to-peer network where transactions travel a meshed network directly to other endpoints, without the need to travel to a single point. This allows Mastercard's network to be much more resilient, in that a single failure cannot isolate a large number of endpoints.

== See also ==
- Access
- Cirrus
- Damage waiver
- Entrust Bankcard
- Maestro
- 3-D Secure
- Mondex
- Octopus card
- Payoneer
- Redecard
