= Tex Fletcher =

American singer-songwriter

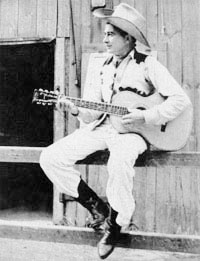
Tex Fletcher and his guitar in 1936

Geremino Bisceglia (January 17, 1910 in Harrison, New York – March 14, 1987 in Newburgh, New York), better known as Tex Fletcher, was an American singing cowboy with credits as a recording artist, Broadway and movie actor, night club performer, and radio and television personality.

== Early life ==
Born in Harrison, New York, Fletcher was the fifth of eight children born to Italian immigrants Michael (a stonemason) and Josephine Bisceglia. Tex left home in 1924 at age 15, and joined the Sells Floto Circus which traveled across the US and Canada.

He settled in South Dakota where he learned to handle horse and cattle while soaking up cowboy lore and campfire songs, in effect becoming a "real" cowboy. He returned to New York in the early 1930s and took a radio job as a singing cowboy on WFAS in White Plains, New York.

== 1930s ==
The 1930s proved a busy and productive time for Fletcher, as he appeared on radio, starred on Broadway, starred in two movies, toured the country as a soloist and with a group, played Madison Square Garden, landed a record deal with Decca (that lasted well into the 1950s) and performed for the president of the United States.

By 1932, Tex was singing cowboy songs over WFAS in White Plains, New York. In 1934, he landed the role of cowboy answer man on WOR, New Jersey, at the height of the singing cowboy craze, replacing close friend and cowboy star, Tex Ritter (he remained with WOR for more than 20 years, going off the air in 1957). After a run on Broadway in the production of Howdy Stranger in 1937, Tex became a member of popular radio hillbilly group, “Tom Emerson’s Mountaineers,” then broadcasting nationwide over WMCA and affiliates, touring the country and with whom he appeared in the Hollywood musical production of “Down on The Barn” in 1938. This initial movie appearance brought the handsome singer to the attention of Hollywood talent scouts looking for a fresh face to star in a new series of sagebrush musicals planned by Acadia Productions to be made by Grand National Pictures, again taking the place of Tex Ritter who had moved on to another studio.

Upon release of the series' first film Six-Gun Rhythm, Grand National went belly-up, leaving the oater in limited distribution and its newest star in the lurch. Tex literally "took the bull by the horns" and set out on a one-man promotional tour for the film of the Northeast US and Canada, the center of his popularity. He was occasionally accompanied by his friend and mentor, Tex Ritter. He drove from town to town with his own 16mm print of "Six-Gun Rhythm," custom made Martin D-42 guitar and his cowboy outfits in the back seat. He would perform a few songs, show the picture, sign autographs and then move on to the next town. This action is what many believe to be the reason the b-western has enjoyed such a long shelf life and has been held in such high esteem among collectors, as it would have otherwise been virtually unknown.

== Post-war career ==
After several years of this promotional effort, Fletcher entered the United States Army during World War II, reaching the rank of Sergeant. Upon his return, he devoted his efforts to being a full-time musician, working in nightclubs, on WOR radio (coast to coast via the Mutual Network) and television (WJZ-TV, WNBT, WOR-TV). He was featured in Ripley's Believe It or Not! as having the ability to recall from memory more than 4,000 songs. He recorded for numerous labels including ARC, Decca, Vocalion, Majestic, Montgomery Ward, Flint, SESAC, Waldorf Music, Grand Award and his own Dakota label.

In the early 1950s, Fletcher was a member of the cast of Bobby Benson and the B-Bar-B Riders, a Western on the Mutual Broadcasting System.

In 1960, Tex opened a bar and restaurant in Rockerville, South Dakota, where he hired bartender and future United States Senator James Abourezk

Afterward, Tex had no desire to return to Hollywood and turned down all subsequent offers to continue the series from other movie production companies, and other offers to return to Hollywood - some of which continued into the 1980s - opting instead to focus on radio and live performances.

Fletcher was a prolific songwriter, having penned the cowboy classics, "The Lord is In The Saddle Tonight," "Tiperary (The Great Outlaw Horse)", "My Harding County Home," the closing theme to CBS television's The Adventures of Wild Bill Hickok, and others. His songs were covered by Gene Autry, Ernest Tubb, Lawrence Welk, bluesman Magic Slim, blues duo Pistol Pete and Ron Hytower, and modern day cowboy–folklorist Glenn Ohrlin.

== Personal life ==
At the end of the war, he married Ada Mae Henkel September 27, 1924 – September 9, 2003) of Yonkers, New York, and started a family with five children: Robert (1947–1999), Jayne (1951–2021), Kathy, George, and Michael (1961-2025). Returned to radio, nightclubs (emcee and entertainer at the Village Barn, Manhattan) and television (ABC, NBC, WOR). Last album, Holiday Hootenanny released 1964 on his own Dakota imprint.

He died in on March 14th 1987 in Newburgh, New York.

== Sources ==
- Allmovie by Hans J. Wollstein, quoted at the NY Times
- www.texfletcher.com
- Tex Fletcher at IMDb
