= Reid Hall, Manhattanville College =

United States historic place in New York

- Reid Hall, Manhattanville University
- U.S. National Register of Historic Places
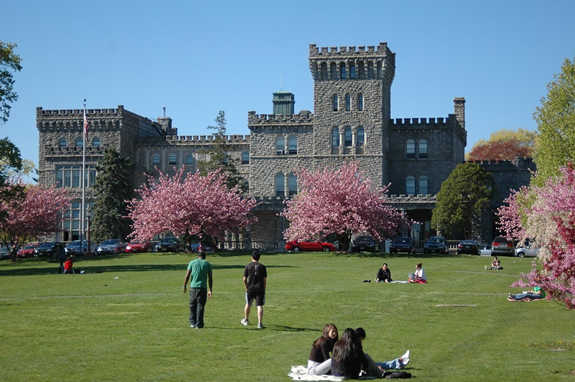

- Location within New York Location within the United States
- Location: Manhattanville University, Purchase St., Purchase, New York
- Coordinates: 41°01′56″N 73°42′57″W
- Area: Structure 50,000 square feet (4,600 m^{2}); Grounds 1.5 acres (0.61 ha)
- Built: 1892
- Architect: Stanford White; Frederick Law Olmsted
- Architectural style: Renaissance
- NRHP reference No.: 74001321
- Added to NRHP: March 22, 1974

Reid Hall, also known as "The Castle", is a historic academic building located on the campus of Manhattanville University at Purchase, Westchester County, New York, United States. The Renaissance Revival structure was built in 1892 as a 50,000 sq ft (4,600 m^{2}) private home for publisher and diplomat Whitelaw Reid, with estate landscaping by Frederick Law Olmsted.

== History ==
The Castle was designed by Stanford White and built in 1892 as a dwelling for Whitelaw Reid after he returned from Paris after serving as the 28th United States Minister to France. Frederick Law Olmsted was hired to landscape his estate. Reid Hall occupies the footprint of the previous property owner Ben Holladay's Ophir Hall, which burned down and was rebuilt by Reid with the massive granite crenellated mansion. The building was expanded in 1912 by McKim, Mead & White with a large library wing and guest cottage.

Reid Hall was at one time a potential site for the United Nations. The property was purchased by Manhattanville College in 1951.

It was added to the National Register of Historic Places in 1974.

=== Features ===
It is a four-story, L-shaped building built of granite blocks in the Renaissance Revival style. It features a five-story tower and a corbelled battlement parapet that conceals a flat roof.

== See also ==
- National Register of Historic Places listings in southern Westchester County, New York
