= United States Post Office (Harrison, New York) =

- US Post Office–Harrison
- U.S. National Register of Historic Places
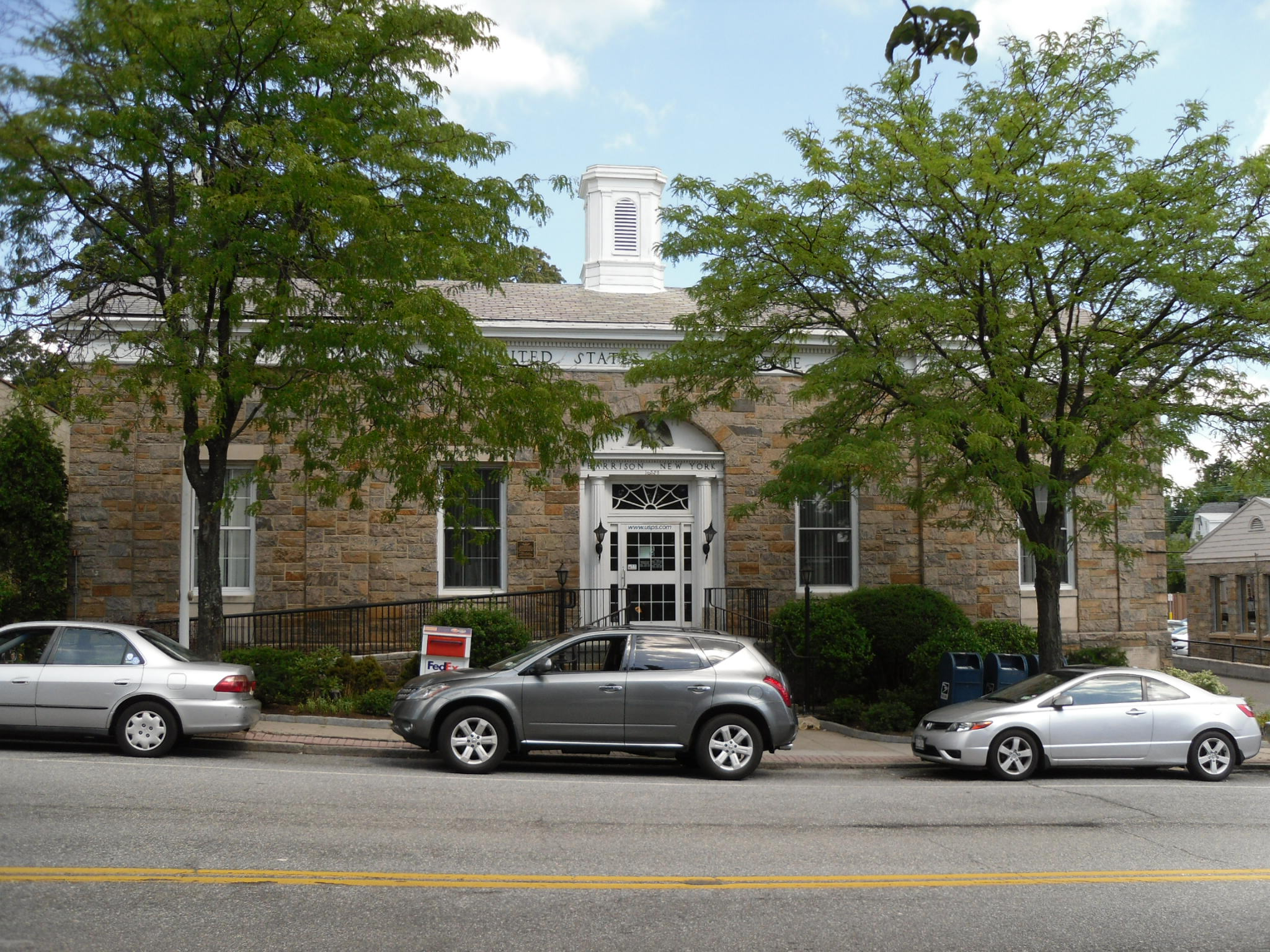
- U.S. Post Office, Harrison, New York, July 2010

- Location within New York Location within the United States
- Interactive map showing the location for U.S. Post Office-Harrison
- Location: 258 Halstead Ave., Harrison, New York, 10528
- Coordinates: 40°58′7″N 73°42′51″W
- Area: less than one acre
- Built: 1938
- Architect: Simon, Louis A.; Goodwin, Harold
- Architectural style: Colonial Revival
- MPS: US Post Offices in New York State, 1858-1943, TR
- NRHP reference No.: 88002524
- Added to NRHP: May 11, 1989

The Harrison Post Office is a historic post office building located at Harrison in Westchester County, New York, United States. It was built in 1938 by the Office of the Supervising Architect under the direction of Louis A. Simon. It is a one-story, symmetrically massed building clad with random stone ashlar in the Colonial Revival style. The entrance is flanked by fluted, engaged Doric order columns and pilasters which support a simple entablature. The slate roof is topped by a square, flat topped cupola. The lobby features a 1941 mural by Harold Goodwin titled Early Days of the Automobile.

It was listed on the National Register of Historic Places as US Post Office–Harrison in 1989.

== See also ==
- National Register of Historic Places listings in southern Westchester County, New York
