= International Headquarters =

International Headquarters may refer to:

- Boeing International Headquarters in Chicago
- International Headquarters of The Salvation Army in London
- Gold Base, headquarters of the Church of Scientology in Riverside County, California
- MasterCard International Global Headquarters in Harrison, New York
- Reynolds Metals Company International Headquarters in Richmond, Virginia
