= Rebate card =

Loyalty debit card

A rebate card is a debit card that provides funds promised by a business as a rebate. They are often offered to those who make a specific purchase, or for loyalty to a company by accumulating a certain amount of money or number of points worth of purchases from a particular company.

While some rebate cards are valid anywhere where a major credit card is accepted, others can be used at a more limited number of locations, such as certain companies, business types, or localities, or at participating retailers.

== Criticism of rebate cards ==
Rebate cards have been criticized for not offering consumers the full amount of their value. With many of them, it is impossible to know exactly how much is remaining on the card at the point of sale. A purchase for less than the amount remaining can be made with the card, but a purchase for even one penny above this amount will be declined. Very few stores will allow split-tender transactions (transactions in which the rebate card is used for part of the purchase, and some other form of payment for the remainder. Due to the likelihood of a purchase being equal to the remaining amount being so low, most consumers do not get every penny that can be found on a rebate card, and the companies offering them pocket the remainder.

Rebate cards often have expiration dates, allowing very little time for consumers to use them. Some deduct a certain amount from the card as time passes during their life.

To combat these problems, critics recommend consumers exchange their rebate cards on websites like eBay, or Craigslist, where consumers can receive cash or cash equivalents for their rebate cards.

== Laws regarding rebate cards ==
Use of the term "rebate card" has been outlawed in Canada.

== See also ==
- Bait and switch
- Entrust Bankcard
- Frequent-flyer program
- Gift card
- Loyalty program
