= Diminution in value =

Diminution in value is a legal term of art used when calculating damages in a legal dispute, and describes a measure of value lost due to a circumstance or set of circumstances that caused the loss. Specifically, it measures the value of something before and after the causative act or omission creating the lost value in order to calculate compensatory damages.

In legal damages theories, diminution in value is often calculated for compensatory special damages when a loss is monetarily quantifiable, and for restitution or disgorgement damages when the loss has unfairly enriched a wrongdoer.

== Examples ==
=== Compensatory damages ===
==== Tort example ====
Person P has an apple cart which wrongdoer W runs over with a car. P depends upon the cart for selling apples as their sole source of income. P is able to salvage some of the parts from the damaged cart and gets the cart fixed using the salvaged parts. P goes back to selling apples the next week, but finds her customers have started to go elsewhere for their apples since she was not available for the week her cart was being repaired. In order to win back her customers P advertises her return and also sells her apples for a discount for a week.

P wants to recover the diminution in value of their business from W. In order to do this P must determine the cost of the repairs and damaged apples, their lost opportunity cost or profit loss (how much profit they would have made during the week they were unable to sell apples), the advertising costs, and the lost profit from having to sell at a discount for a week.

To determine the diminution in value of her business, P calculates:

the cost to repair the damaged cart,
less the cost of salvageable parts,
plus the cost of the apples lost,
plus the lost profits for the week it takes to repair the cart,
plus the advertising costs,
plus the profit loss of discounted apples sold for one week.

==== Car accidents ====
After car accidents, the right to claim diminution in value depends on the country or state and who is at fault.

Major car rental companies do charge their renters for diminished value after accidents, unless the renter pays for a Damage waiver (Avis, Budget, National, Thrifty). Some companies even say they alone will decide the diminution (Dollar, Hertz"). Charging for diminution in value may not be allowed in California, Indiana, Nevada, New York, Wisconsin, Australia or New Zealand, since Hertz does not charge it in those locations. Hertz does charge in Europe, the Middle East and Africa: "loss in value of the Car".

==== Mixed contract and tort example ====
- Person P buys a dividend-bearing and interest-bearing contract from insurer B.
- P dies some years later, but B does not inform P's heirs of the contract's existence. At P's death there is 1 million dollars in the contract fund, and the contract is still active but not yet mature.
- A short time after P's death, B wrongfully stops paying interest on the contract, and while dividends continue to accrue on the amount then in the contract fund, B wrongfully does not roll such dividends back into the contract fund. Instead, B places the dividends into a separate account.
- Some years later P's heirs discover the contract and eventually recover the dividends B paid into the separate account, but not the interest lost on the contract fund after B removed the dividends, and not the greater amount of dividends that would have been paid but for B's removal of dividends in the first place.
- P's heirs sue B to recover their losses as damages.
- To calculate their loss, P's heirs

- begin with the value of the contract fund at P's death: $1 million
- then calculate the dividend amounts and interest that B should have paid had B continued to roll dividends back into the fund.

- To do this P's heirs must first calculate the amount in dividends that should have been paid into the fund at each regular dividend interval, then calculate how much interest should have been paid for each of those intervals, e.g.:

Year 1: $1,000,000 in fund + $10,000 dividends + $80,800 interest = $1,090,800
Year 2: $1,090,800 in fund + $12,000 dividends + $66,168 interest = $1,168,968
etc., until all payment periods are accounted for.

When P's heirs have added up what they lost they'll have discovered the difference between what they would have had B not acted wrongfully, and what they ended up with: the diminution in value of the contract fund.

=== Restitution or Disgorgement ===
Adding to the example above, B kept both P's interest and dividends for its own use for a period of years and used these monies to invest in ventures which in turn earned profit and further interest for B. Thus B's misappropriation of P's funds not only deprived P and P's heirs of P's property, but further enriched B because B made a profit from its wrongful use and earned interest on that profit.

In this example, calculating the diminution in value of the contract fund that occurred by B's wrongdoing is helpful to a legal tribunal or settlement negotiation in discovering not only the value of property lost, but the initial enrichment value to B. It may not be possible to account for B's total enrichment in the fullness of time with a high degree of accuracy, but if B's profits made using P's money are calculable, the measure of B's profit disgorgement may accurately reflect a fair restitution for P when added to damages from the diminution of the contract fund.

Therefore, calculating the diminution in value of P's property is a primary factor in calculating either restitution or disgorgement damages, or both, in a case such as in this example.

== See also ==
- Legal remedy
- Damages
