= Keio Academy of New York =

- 慶應義塾ニューヨーク学院

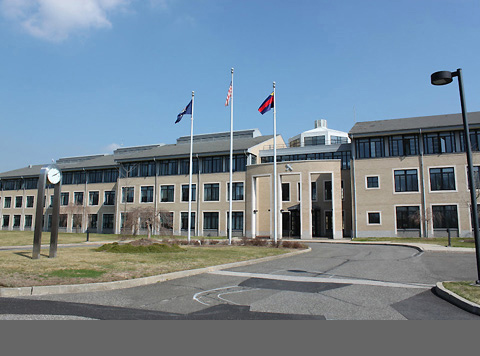

Location
- 3 College Road; Purchase, New York 10577; United States; 41°1′52.1″N 73°43′8.5″W

Information
- School type: Private high school
- Grades: 9-12
- Gender: Coed
- Campus type: Suburban
- Website: www.keio.edu

Keio Academy of New York (慶應義塾ニューヨーク学院, Keiō Gijuku Nyūyōku Gakuin; Keio NY) is a private high school in Purchase, Harrison, New York, in the New York City metropolitan area. It is sponsored by Keio University, making it an overseas branch of a Japanese private school, or a Shiritsu zaigai kyōiku shisetsu (私立在外教育施設).

After the retirement of the Head of School, Ralph Townsend who served from August 2019, the executive director, Motohiro Tsuchiya (vice-president of Keio University) concurrently served. Later, Takayuki Tatsumi, Professor Emeritus of Keio University, was appointed as the Headmaster in January 2022.

== History ==
The school was founded in 1990. Before Keio Academy opened, many children of Japanese nationals on work assignments in the United States returned to Japan to get a high school education. Keio Academy opened so they could get a Japanese education in the United States. By 1988 the Japanese government decided not to fund the school. When Keio Academy opened in 1990, the university fully funded the school.

In 1994 the school serves grades 9–12. It had 420 students that year, making it one of the largest Japanese curriculum schools located in the United States. In 1994 Yasumitsui Nihei, the principal, stated that of the 115 recent graduates, many began attending Keio University while only four went to American colleges.

In 2005, the enrollment was 330, with 21 students being day students and the remainder staying on campus.

== Academics ==
In 1994 the school was accredited by the Ministry of Education of Japan and by the State of New York. That year, Nihei stated that the curriculum at the school would prepare a student for attending an American university.

== Campus ==
The school is located about 30 miles (48 km) north of Manhattan. The school has a 27-acre (11 ha) campus. The main school building, called the "Classroom Building," houses classrooms, administrative offices, the counseling room, the Japanese culture room, and the library. The culture room, where traditional Japanese activities are held, is on the first floor, and the library is located on the third floor. Matsushita Hall serves as the cafeteria. The school also has two dormitory facilities. The South Dorm houses the training room, the school's athletic center. The school also has the Health Center, which serves as a clinic.

As of 1994, 60-70% of Keio students board and live in dormitories.

== Admissions and tuition ==
In 1994 the school did not admit children resident in Japan. That year Nihei stated that children resident in Japan may attend Japanese school campuses affiliated with Keio University. By 2019 the school began admitting Japan-resident pupils.

In 1994 there was a registration fee of $2,500 ($5430.51 with inflation) and a yearly tuition of $13,260 ($28803.44 with inflation).

== Notable alumni ==
- Keiji Ozaki, taekwondo practitioner
- Jewels, former member of Heartsdales
- Yuki Furukawa, actor and supermodel
- YU, vocalist of I Don't Like Mondays.

== See also ==
- Keio University
- Japanese in New York City
- American School in Japan, American international school in Tokyo
- Japanese language education in the United States
