= Harrison High School (New York) =

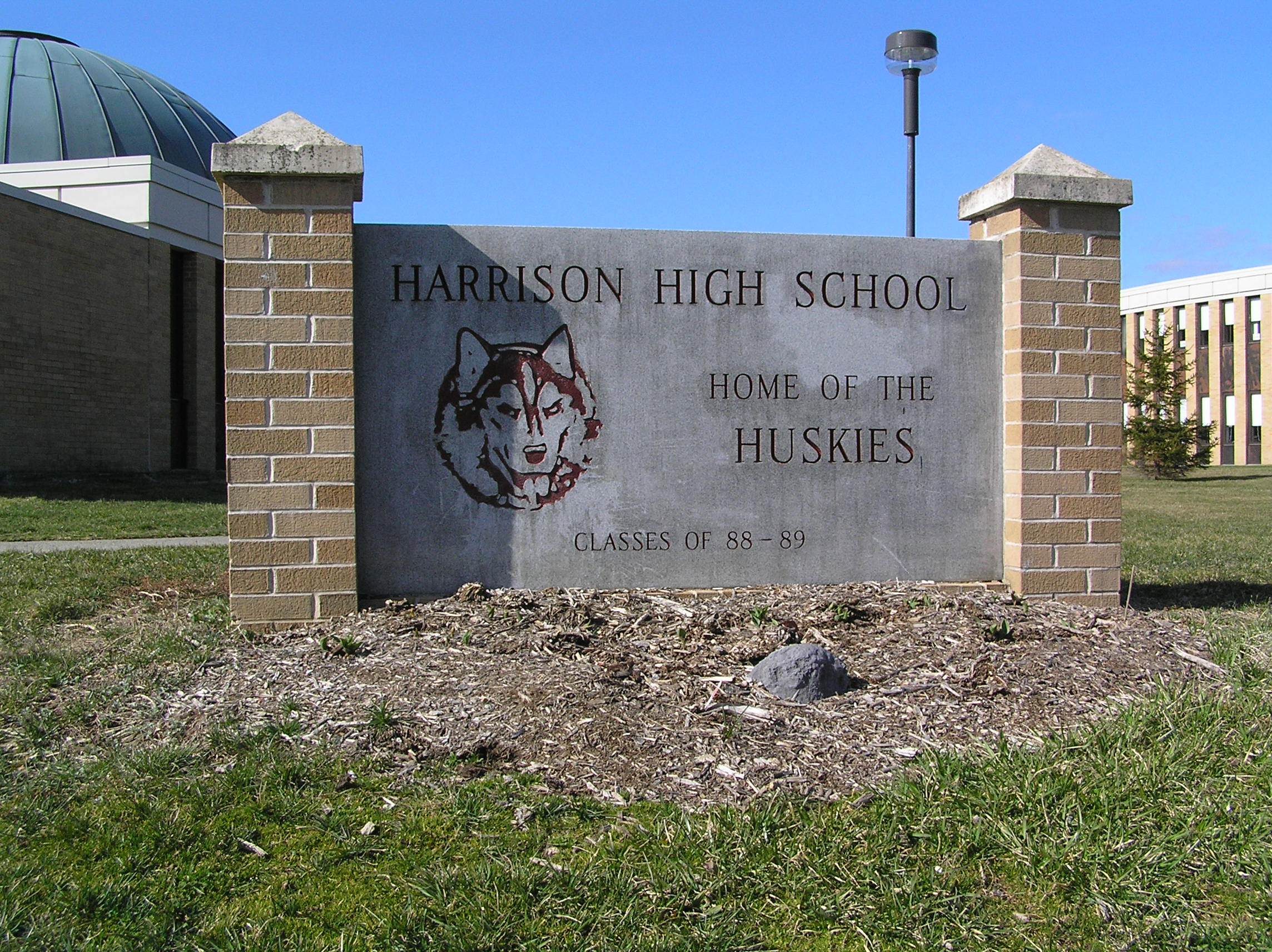

Location
- 255 Union Avenue; Harrison, New York 10528; United States; 40°58′52″N 73°44′13″W

Information
- School type: Public, high school
- School district: Harrison Central School District
- Principal: Kimberly Beukema
- Teaching staff: 105.94 (on an FTE basis) (2022–2023)
- Grades: 9–12
- Gender: Co-ed
- Enrollment: 1,064 (2022–2023)
- Student to teacher ratio: 10.04 (2022–2023)
- Campus: Suburban
- Colors: Maroon; White
- Sports: Section 1 (NYSPHSAA)
- Mascot: Husky
- Nickname: Huskies
- Rival: Rye, NY
- Newspaper: Husky Herald
- Yearbook: Reminiscence
- Website: hhs.harrisoncsd.org

Harrison High School (HHS) is a public high school located in Harrison, Westchester County, New York, United States. The school is 22 miles (35 km) northeast of New York City. It is the only high school operated by the Harrison Central School District.

== Academics ==
In 2016, Harrison ranked 211th in the nation and 13th in the state in rigor according to The Washington Post "America's Most Challenging High Schools" index.

In 2019, Harrison ranked 328th nationally in the U.S. News & World Report "Best High Schools Rankings."

In 2026, Harrison ranked 4th best public high school in New York and 211th nationally in the U.S. News & World Report “Best High Schools Rankings.”

== Demographics ==
The demographic breakdown of the 1,073 students enrolled in 2021–22 was:

- Male – 46.5%
- Female – 53.5%
- Native American/Alaskan – 0.1%
- Asian – 7.7%
- Black – 2.6%
- Hispanic – 22.5%
- White – 64.9%
- Multiracial – 2.2%

21.2% of the students were eligible for free or reduced lunch.

== Athletics ==
Harrison High teams are named "Huskies." Their colors are maroon and white. One of the oldest traditions is the Harrison-Rye game, a football game between the Harrison Huskies and the Garnets, the football team from Rye High School in the neighboring town of Rye, New York.

== Building ==
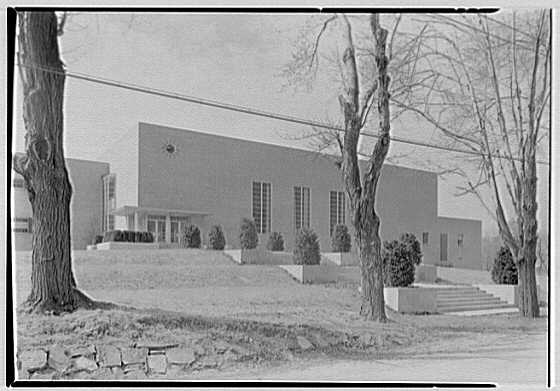
The previous Harrison High School in 1941

The current building of the Harrison High School was built in 1973 and 1974, and opened for September 1974. It was built as a solution to overcrowding at Harrison Junior/Senior High School, which served grades 6 to 12. Harrison JSHS was established in 1957 in the building built for Harrison High School in 1939. The building is now used as the middle school. Harrison High School demonstrates a circular design, like a rotunda, with a hallway spanning one quarter of a circle, and a hallway that is a full circle radially centered inside the primary hallway, connected by two other hallways, the Main Hallway, and the Senior Hallway. The building is two stories tall and has two gyms, a cafeteria, a theater, and 213 classrooms.

The building is home to the Harrison Performing Arts Center (HPAC), renovated in 2007 by a $1,250,000 grant received from the New York State Education Department in collaboration with the Harrison Educational Foundation (HEF). The Harrison Performing Arts Center (HPAC) features 825 seats, two balconies, a separate light booth, and an extra high stage bow, as well as state-of-the-art lighting systems by Electronic Theatre Controls and audio systems by Allen and Heath. The HPAC is entirely managed by students. The Harrison Technical Crew has been recognized by the Helen Hayes Youth Theatre Foundation for Outstanding Achievement in Musicals and Drama. The HPAC and Sirius Black Box Theatre are under the supervision of the Director of Fine and Performing Arts, Mr. Matthew Royal.

The building was originally home to a then-state-of-the-art planetarium complete with a 25-foot diameter dome and a projector that could recede into a tunnel when not used, as well as built-in, theater-style seating and offset lighting. Unfortunately, due to lack of space, when a dance studio was needed for the school to be able to apply for the International Baccalaureate (IB) program, it was determined that the planetarium should be renovated. It is now a dance studio/planetarium/black box theater called the Sirius Black Box Theater, with a movable star projector, mirrors mounted on the walls, a wooden floor, and folding seating. The name Sirius refers to the star of the same name.
