= Loss of use =

Legal term

Loss of use is the inability, due to a tort or other injury to use a body part, animal, equipment, premises, or other property. Law.com defines it as "the inability to use an automobile, premises or some equipment due to damage to the vehicle, premises or articles caused by the negligence or other wrongdoing of another."

== Schedule loss of use of a member (Workers' Compensation law) ==
Under workers' compensation law, a schedule loss of use is the set amount of compensation an employee may receive for the inability to use a particular body member, such as an arm, hand, finger, leg, foot, or toe. An injured employee will receive monetary benefits for the loss of use of such a body member during periods of temporary disability associated therewith, and/or at the time a judicial finding is made of permanent impairment. These monetary benefits are in addition to other benefits for compensation such as medical benefits. An essential basis for calculating a Schedule Loss of Use ("SLU") is often a multiple of the injured employee's pre-injury average weekly wage, or some percentage thereof, as determined by a state's Workers' Compensation Law. This wage information is utilized in conjunction with a medical assessment by an evaluating physician, together with a schedule which standardizes the value of particular injuries. This standardization is necessary to ensure Equal Protection while applying a Workers' Compensation scheme. The physician's loss assessment is converted to a period of weeks, utilizing the schedule published in law, and then this number of weeks is multiplied by the wage basis to determine the total value of the SLU. Due to the complexity of the calculations involved in determining an SLU, it may be useful to utilize an SLU calculator, such as may be provided on legal, public service, academic, or informational websites. The etymology of tort is from the French word for twisted—as in wrongful, trespassing, sick, perverted, or disturbed. Unlike in other aspects of tort law, rather than being figurative, the meaning is sometimes literal, whereby a worker's arm has been twisted by machinery, and is rendered useless for work.

== Loss of use (property) ==
Under property law, almost any possible property can be the subject of loss of use. This might include equipment, goods, inventory, a residence, a farm, a motor vehicle, office building, or commercial property. For example, the real property can not be used due to a chemical spill, or the car can not be driven because it was damaged in a motor vehicle accident.

When business equipment is damaged the injured business is entitled to a loss of use claim for the damaged property. In the trucking industry this is often referred to as downtime. Downtime claims indemnify for loss of earnings resulting from inability to operate because of damage to a tractor or trailer from an insured peril such as a collision or a fire. These claims can be made against the adverse party’s insurance policy. The loss must be established by presenting the previous income for the damaged equipment.

Insurance companies may use various formulas to calculate downtime losses. A common method is to determine gross income for 90 days before the accident, then subtract all variable expenses such as fuel, tolls, oil, etc. to figure a net income amount. Next, divide net income by the days actually driven during the 90 days before the truck was disabled in order to get a daily net loss figure. Finally, multiply the daily income times the number of days the truck is in the repair shop to arrive at your lost income amount.

Car rental companies charge renters for loss of use in case of accidents, though the charges have been controversial. Insurers want to see the rental company's fleet utilization logs. If the rental company had other unused similar cars at the time, insurers argue the rental company suffered no loss from the unavailability of the damaged car. The Florida Supreme Court supported that interpretation in 2008. The Colorado Supreme Court disagreed, saying a car rental company (originally National) was "entitled to recover loss of use damages irrespective of its actual lost profits" in 2012. California, New York, and some other states restrict loss of use charges

Some rental company terms say they will "charge for loss of use, regardless of fleet utilization" (Alamo, Avis, Hertz—adding the words in October 2016, National).

- Alamo and Enterprise charge for loss of use at the same daily rate the renter was paying, for twice as many days as the repair needs, since they charge a day for each four hours of repair work.
- National also charges a day for each 4 hours of repair, plus 40% to cover weekends, plus 3 administrative days, so a 26-hour job is charged as 11.5 days.
- Enterprise CarShare (hourly rentals) charges four days for each hour of repair time.
- In 2008 Hertz loss of use was "calculated by dividing daily rental rate by percent of fleet utilization" ("dividing" may be a misprint for "multiplying").

== Loss of use insurance ==
A property owner may purchase insurance to indemnify against the loss of use of property, especially real property, such as a home, office, or business premises.

== See also ==
- Insurance law
