= Mastercard International Global Headquarters =

Office building

Coordinates: 41.020800°N 73.709661°W

The Mastercard International Global Headquarters is an office building located at 2000 Purchase Street in the hamlet of Purchase, New York. It was constructed in the early 1980s as part of a movement of large corporations onto suburban estate settings, and has been called the "architectural jewel of Westchester". The building is part of the Purchase Centre complex and originally was constructed by the Nestlé company and occupied by IBM for several years. It was designed by I. M. Pei of Pei Cobb Freed & Partners and has won awards over the years for its architectural style.

== History ==
In 1977, the United States-based component of Nestlé announced its intention to move from its headquarters in White Plains, New York, to a new site in Purchase, New York. Nestlé had been one of the first companies to move to a suburban environment 25 years earlier and was part of a general relocation movement at the time of companies' headquarters to "estate settings". Nestlé stated that if the town did not grant a zoning amendment for the parcel it had selected, it would move the headquarters out of the state. However, the town of Harrison objected to the construction on the grounds that the new building would interfere with the town's zoning plan that had been adopted five years earlier and would cause traffic flow problems in the area. Then-governor of New York Hugh Carey intervened on behalf of Nestlé, but in June 1977 the town board rejected the request for the zoning amendment. Nestlé then approached Manhattanville College, which had recently announced plans to sell 135 acres (0.55 km^{2}) of surplus land from its 250-acre (1.0 km^{2}) campus. With subsequent state modifications to the I-684 highway to the site, it became possible for the construction of the headquarters.

By 1980, Nestlé had commissioned renowned architect I. M. Pei to design the building, which would be composed of a central saw-toothed parallelogram and two quarter-circle wings. Then in 1982, Nestlé announced that it had sold the half-completed building to IBM as a result of changing financial projections and that it would remain in its White Plains location. Later in 1986 Nestlé constructed a new building across the road from the 2000 Purchase Street facility that would serve as its headquarters until it moved again to Glendale, California in 1992.

IBM would use the facility to centralize activities in the Westchester area from 1985 to 1992 when it began moving employees to other facilities as part of cost containment efforts. By 1994 the facility was purchased by MasterCard to serve as its global headquarters. MasterCard moved into 2000 Purchase Street in October 1995 and in December 2001 acquired the 100 Manhattanville Road facility to serve as its North American Region headquarters.

== Structure ==
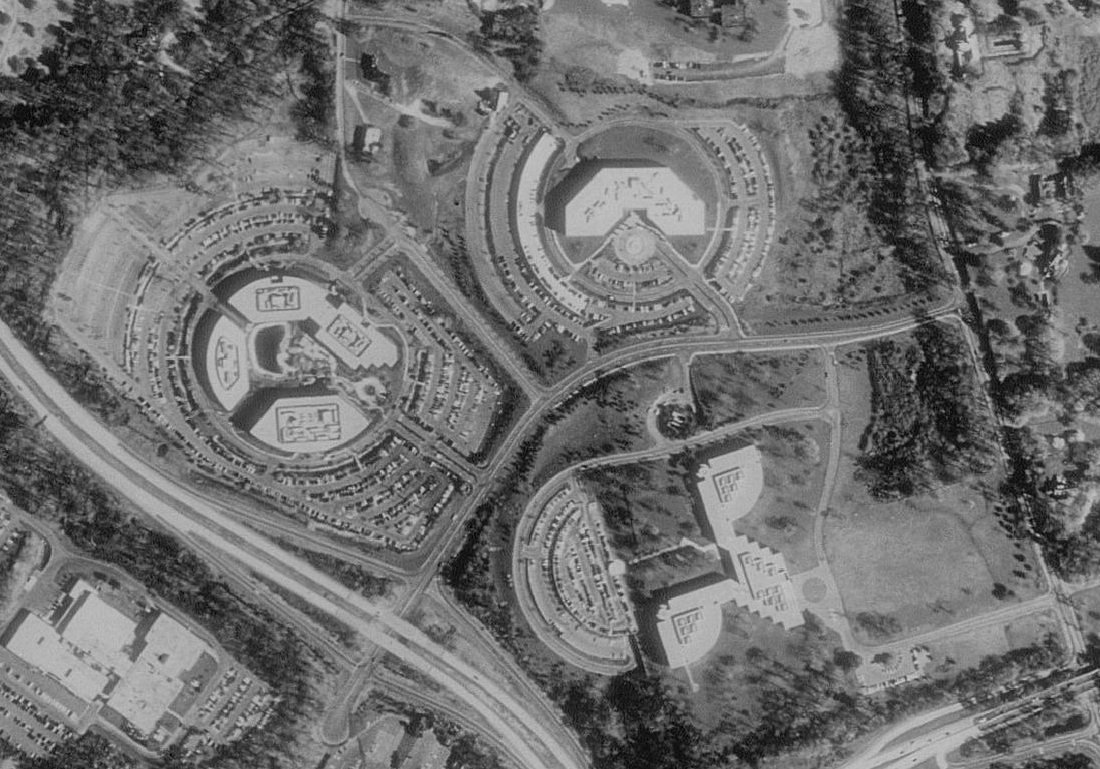
The Purchase Centre complex

The facility is a three-story building that incorporates travertine stone and architectural concrete to maximize the effectiveness of natural resources. The facility is composed of a central lobby with a full-height atrium and two quarter-circle wings to the north and west with smaller atria, all incorporating natural features such as ficus trees and an indoor stream. Also on-site is a cafeteria, a company store, and other employee amenities. A 1,100 car parking facility is built into a hillside on the site.

=== Awards ===
- 1988 Building Stone Institute: Annual Tucker Award
- 1986 American Institute of Architects: National Honor Award
- 1986 Concrete Industry Board: Annual Award
