= Entrust Bankcard Company =

Payment processing company based in Phoenix, Arizona

- Company type: Private
- Industry: Merchant Services, Financial services
- Founded: Mesa, Arizona, U.S. 2006
- Area served: Worldwide
- Key people: Nathan J. Reis (CEO)
- Products: Point of sale, online gateway, wireless payment services, and gift card/loyalty programs
- Services: Finance
- Number of employees: 158 (2010)
- Website: www.entrustbankcard.com

Entrust Bankcard is a payment processing company based in Phoenix, Arizona in the United States. Founded in 2006, Entrust Bankcard was listed at #18 on Inc.'s 2011 "Inc. 500" of the 500 fastest growing companies in America.

2010 revenue for Entrust Bankcard was $9.4 million, an increase of 8,417% over 2007's $110 thousand. Entrust grew from 6 employees to 158 employees during that time. Since 2008, Entrust Bankcard has gone from serving 800 customers to almost 4,000 by November 2010.

Entrust Bankcard claims to donate 10% of its profits toward Engage Foundation but never followed through. The Engage Foundation is a charity owned by Nathan J. Reis, the Entrust Bankcard CEO. The Engage Foundation is directed towards single mothers and young children as Reis was raised by a single mother in Wisconsin.

On May 20, 2011, the Better Business Bureau revoked the accreditation of Entrust Bankcard, leaving it with a rating of "F".
