= National Register of Historic Places listings in southern Westchester County, New York =

Location of Westchester County in New York

This is a list of the National Register of Historic Places listings in southern Westchester County, New York, excluding the cities of New Rochelle and Yonkers, which have separate lists of their own.

This is intended to be a complete list of the properties and districts on the National Register of Historic Places in the southern half of Westchester County, New York, United States. The following communities comprise this region:

- Town of Eastchester, including the villages of Bronxville and Tuckahoe, and the hamlet of Crestwood
- Town of Greenburgh, excluding Tarrytown but including the villages of Ardsley, Dobbs Ferry, Elmsford, Hastings-on-Hudson, and Irvington, and the hamlets of Edgemont and Hartsdale
- Village and town of Harrison
- Town of Mamaroneck, including the villages of Larchmont and Mamaroneck
- City of Mount Vernon
- Town of Pelham, which is the villages of Pelham and Pelham Manor
- City of Rye
- Town of Rye, including the villages of Port Chester and Rye Brook
- Village and town of Scarsdale
- City of White Plains

Latitude and longitude coordinates are provided for many National Register properties and districts; these locations may be seen together in online maps.

Of the 245 properties and districts listed on the National Register in the county, 92, including seven National Historic Landmarks (NHLs), are on this list. Two, the Bronx River Parkway and Old Croton Aqueduct, the latter an NHL, are linear listings included on both this list and the northern Westchester list.

This National Park Service list is complete through NPS recent listings posted July 31, 2026.

Contents: Counties in New York
Albany (Albany) – Allegany – Bronx – Broome – Cattaraugus – Cayuga – Chautauqua – Chemung – Chenango – Clinton – Columbia – Cortland – Delaware – Dutchess (Poughkeepsie, Rhinebeck) – Erie (Buffalo) – Essex – Franklin – Fulton – Genesee – Greene – Hamilton – Herkimer – Jefferson – Kings – Lewis – Livingston – Madison – Monroe (Rochester) – Montgomery – Nassau – New York (Below 14th Street, 14th to 59th Streets, 59th to 110th Streets, Above 110th Street, Islands) – Niagara (Niagara Falls) – Oneida – Onondaga (Syracuse) – Ontario – Orange – Orleans – Oswego – Otsego – Putnam – Queens – Rensselaer – Richmond – Rockland – St. Lawrence – Saratoga – Schenectady – Schoharie – Schuyler – Seneca – Steuben – Suffolk – Sullivan – Tioga – Tompkins – Ulster – Warren – Washington – Wayne – Westchester (Northern, Southern, New Rochelle, Peekskill, Yonkers) – Wyoming – Yates

== Current listings ==
	Name on the Register	Image	Date listed	Location	City or town	Description
1	African Cemetery	African Cemetery	October 3, 2003 (#03000999)	North St. 40°58′34″N 73°42′12″W	Rye	Historic segregated cemetery, established in 1860 and used until 1964, including burial of veterans from the Civil War through World War II; located within Greenwood Union Cemetery.
2	Armour-Stiner House	Armour-Stiner House	December 18, 1975 (#75001238)	45 W. Clinton Ave. 41°01′51″N 73°52′16″W	Irvington	Possibly the only domed octagon house in the world
3	Bar Building	Bar Building	May 17, 2007 (#07000331)	199 Main St. 41°01′57″N 73°46′05″W	White Plains	
4	Bird Homestead	Bird Homestead	February 22, 2010 (#10000032)	600 Milton Rd. 40°57′34″N 73°41′21″W	Rye	Original Greek Revival home built in 1835 with several farm buildings of the Bird family
5	Bolton Priory	Bolton Priory	June 28, 1974 (#74001320)	7 Priory Lane; 40°53′13″N 73°47′45″W	Pelham Manor	
6	Evangeline Booth House	Evangeline Booth House	February 22, 2011 (#11000040)	101 N. Central Ave. 41°01′12″N 73°47′50″W	Hartsdale	
7	Boston Post Road Historic District	Boston Post Road Historic District	October 29, 1982 (#82001275)	Roughly bounded by Boston Post Rd. and Milton Harbor; 40°57′17″N 73°42′01″W	Rye	The only National Historic Landmark District in Westchester County. Includes Jay Estate, the childhood home of Founding Father John Jay, a nature preserve Marshlands Conservancy, Rye Golf Club, Lounsbury and the Jay Cemetery.
8	Bronx River Parkway Reservation	Bronx River Parkway Reservation	January 11, 1991 (#90002143)	Bronx River Pkwy. from jct. with Sprain Brook Rd. to and including Kensico Dam Plaza; 41°00′59″N 73°47′47″W	Valhalla and Bronxville	
9	Bronxville Women's Club	Bronxville Women's Club	October 3, 2007 (#07001041)	135 Midland Ave. 40°56′30″N 73°49′35″W	Bronxville	
10	Bush-Lyon Homestead	Bush-Lyon Homestead	April 22, 1982 (#82003412)	John Lyon Park, King St. 41°00′48″N 73°40′03″W	Port Chester	
11	Capitol Theater	Capitol Theater	June 7, 1984 (#84003426)	147-151 Westchester Ave. 41°00′06″N 73°39′56″W	Port Chester	
12	Child Welfare Association of Mamaroneck	Child Welfare Association of Mamaroneck	August 6, 2021 (#100006781)	234 Stanley Ave. 40°57′04″N 73°44′15″W	Mamaroneck	
13	Church of St. Barnabas	Church of St. Barnabas	March 24, 2000 (#00000241)	15 N Broadway; 41°02′23″N 73°51′57″W	Irvington	1853 stone Gothic Revival church has included Washington Irving, Philip Schuyler and Jay Gould as members
14	Church of St. Joseph of Arimathea	Church of St. Joseph of Arimathea	January 11, 2002 (#01001439)	2172 Saw Mill River Rd. 41°02′37″N 73°49′46″W	Greenburgh	
15	Jasper F. Cropsey House and Studio	Jasper F. Cropsey House and Studio	May 17, 1973 (#73001287)	49 Washington Ave. 40°59′35″N 73°52′55″W	Hastings-on-Hudson	
16	Old Croton Aqueduct	Old Croton Aqueduct	December 2, 1974 (#74001324)	Runs N from Yonkers to New Croton Dam; 41°00′52″N 73°53′14″W	Various	First long-distance aqueduct built to provide water from upstate to New York City. An engineering marvel in its time now used as a linear park. Designated a National Historic Landmark and revised in 1992; the extended designation includes the aqueduct's route in the Bronx and a small part of Manhattan.
17	John William Draper House	John William Draper House	May 15, 1975 (#75001237)	407 Broadway; 40°59′29″N 73°52′47″W	Hastings-on-Hudson	Home of astrophotography pioneer John William Draper, who in the 1840s took the first recognizable photo of the moon through a telescope at his observatory here.
18	East Irvington School	East Irvington School	October 6, 1983 (#83004216)	Taxter Rd. 41°02′46″N 73°51′21″W	Greenburgh	Late 19th-century school built for children of growing Irish immigrant population; now apartments.
19	Edgewood House	Edgewood House	June 26, 1986 (#86001388)	908 Edgewood Ave. 40°53′41″N 73°49′13″W	Pelham Manor	
20	Elmsford Reformed Church and Cemetery	Elmsford Reformed Church and Cemetery	September 15, 1983 (#83001828)	30 S. Central Ave. 41°03′14″N 73°49′15″W	Elmsford	Congregation organized in 1790; church building erected three years later is oldest building in village and oldest church in continuous use in county
21	Estherwood and Carriage House	Estherwood and Carriage House	November 20, 1979 (#79001646)	Clinton Ave. 41°00′46″N 73°52′21″W	Dobbs Ferry	Late 19th-century mansion and estate of industrial tycoon James Jenning McComb; now part of The Masters School, which he helped endow.
22	First United Methodist Church	First United Methodist Church	January 7, 2000 (#99001656)	226 E. Lincoln Ave. 40°55′06″N 73°49′47″W	Mount Vernon	
23	Leo Friedlander Studio	Leo Friedlander Studio	July 29, 1982 (#82003416)	825 W. Hartsdale Rd. 41°02′35″N 73°48′34″W	Greenburgh	
24	Good Counsel Complex	Good Counsel Complex	April 25, 1997 (#97000358)	52 N. Broadway; 41°02′21″N 73°45′52″W	White Plains	
25	Percy Grainger Home and Studio	Percy Grainger Home and Studio	April 8, 1993 (#93000234)	7 Cromwell Pl. 41°01′38″N 73°46′02″W	White Plains	
26	Hadden-Margolis House	Hadden-Margolis House	March 7, 2008 (#08000146)	61 Winfield Ln. 40°58′19″N 73°44′16″W	Harrison	
27	Hartsdale Pet Cemetery	Hartsdale Pet Cemetery	August 17, 2012 (#12000535)	75 N. Central Park Ave. 41°01′17″N 73°47′49″W	Hartsdale	
28	Hartsdale Railroad Station	Hartsdale Railroad Station	July 14, 2011 (#11000453)	1 E. Hartsdale Ave. 41°00′40″N 73°47′45″W	Hartsdale	1915 railroad station building
29	Hastings Prototype House	Hastings Prototype House	December 19, 1991 (#91001873)	546 Farragut Pkwy. 40°59′04″N 73°52′17″W	Hastings-on-Hudson	1936 Moderne house, built by local developer, was meant to be pattern for a housing development in Florida that was never built. Architect's only work in this style.
30	Widow Haviland's Tavern	Widow Haviland's Tavern	April 16, 1974 (#74001322)	Purchase St. 40°58′55″N 73°41′05″W	Rye	
31	Caleb Hyatt House	Caleb Hyatt House	January 22, 1973 (#73001291)	937 White Plains Post Rd. 40°58′54″N 73°48′00″W	Scarsdale	
32	Hyatt-Livingston House	Hyatt-Livingston House	October 5, 1972 (#72000917)	152 Broadway; 41°00′32″N 73°52′45″W	Dobbs Ferry	Burned down in 1974
33	Irvington Historic District	Irvington Historic District	January 15, 2014 (#13001095)	N. & S. Astor, Broadway, Buckhout, Cottenet, Dearman, Dutcher, Eckar & Ferris Sts., Bridge St., E. & W. Home Pl. 41°02′21″N 73°52′20″W	Irvington	Historic core of small riverside suburb; See map
34	Irvington Town Hall	Irvington Town Hall	November 1, 1984 (#84000205)	85 Main St. 41°02′25″N 73°52′06″W	Irvington	Built in 1902, early use of Colonial Revival in a civic building. Upper floors have an auditorium for performances and community gatherings, was home to public library until 2000.
35	Timothy Knapp House and Milton Cemetery	Timothy Knapp House and Milton Cemetery	June 14, 1982 (#82003413)	265 Rye Beach Ave. and Milton Rd. 40°57′53″N 73°41′12″W	Rye	Built between 1667 and 1670 by Timothy Knapp
36	Larchmont Avenue Church	Larchmont Avenue Church	April 22, 2021 (#100006487)	60 Forest Park Ave. 40°55′47″N 73°45′16″W	Larchmont	
37	Lawrence Park Historic District	Lawrence Park Historic District	January 23, 1980 (#80002788)	Roughly bounded by Side Hill, Prescott, Kensington, Garden and Chestnut Ave., Maidens Ln., and Valley and Pondfield Rds. 40°56′27″N 73°50′19″W	Bronxville	
38	Life Savers Building	Life Savers Building	July 11, 1985 (#85001496)	N. Main St. 41°00′20″N 73°39′52″W	Port Chester	Now a condominium complex
39	Lord and Burnham Building	Lord and Burnham Building	February 12, 1999 (#99000193)	2 Main St. 41°02′22″N 73°52′23″W	Irvington	1870 building, home to eponymous maker of conservatories and greenhouses that supplied local estates, is now the village's library after lengthy restoration.
40	Mamaroneck Methodist Church	Mamaroneck Methodist Church	October 2, 1992 (#92001304)	514 Boston Post Rd. 40°57′05″N 73°43′48″W	Mamaroneck	
41	Manor Club	Manor Club	May 12, 2014 (#14000207)	1023 Esplanade; 40°53′29″N 73°48′14″W	Pelham Manor	
42	Mapleton	Mapleton	September 28, 1976 (#76001295)	52 N. Broadway; 41°02′18″N 73°45′54″W	White Plains	
43	Marble Schoolhouse	Marble Schoolhouse	July 6, 2005 (#05000663)	388 California Rd. 40°55′53″N 73°48′41″W	Eastchester	
44	Masterton-Dusenberry House	Masterton-Dusenberry House	April 16, 1980 (#80002789)	90 White Plains Rd. 40°56′13″N 73°49′06″W	Bronxville	
45	McVickar House	McVickar House	January 14, 2004 (#03001398)	131 Main St. 41°02′20″N 73°51′57″W	Irvington	1853 Greek Revival house is second oldest on village's Main Street
46	New York, Westchester & Boston Railway Highbrook Avenue Bridge	New York, Westchester & Boston Railway Highbrook Avenue Bridge	August 2, 2016 (#16000487)	Highbrook Ave. between Lincoln & Harmon Aves; 40°54′50″N 73°48′17″W	Pelham	Early example of a reinforced concrete arch bridge, dating to 1911
47	Nuits	Nuits	April 13, 1977 (#77000986)	Hudson Rd. and Clifton Pl. 41°01′29″N 73°52′31″W	Irvington	1852 Italian villa-style house was early work by Detlef Lienau; later home to Cyrus West Field and John Jacob Astor III. Only extant example of Lienau's early residential work.
48	Odell House	Odell House	March 28, 1973 (#73001286)	425 Ridge Rd. 41°01′10″N 73°49′04″W	Greenburgh	
49	Pelham Picture House	Pelham Picture House	May 28, 2010 (#10000305)	175 Wolf's Lane; 40°54′26″N 73°48′41″W	Pelham	
50	Pelhamdale	Pelhamdale	November 4, 1982 (#82001276)	45 Iden Ave. 40°54′03″N 73°48′55″W	Pelham Manor	
51	Peoples National Bank and Trust Company Building	Peoples National Bank and Trust Company Building	September 14, 2000 (#00001119)	31 Mamaroneck Ave. 41°01′54″N 73°46′00″W	White Plains	
52	Playland Amusement Park	Playland Amusement Park	July 4, 1980 (#80004529)	Playland Pkwy. and Forest Ave. 40°58′08″N 73°40′17″W	Rye	An early example of an amusement park designed for visitors by car as opposed to public transit; Art Deco stylings on attractions widely copied
53	Presbyterian Rest for Convalescents	Presbyterian Rest for Convalescents	April 27, 2011 (#11000230)	69 N. Broadway; 41°02′19″N 73°46′03″W	White Plains	
54	Jacob Purdy House	Jacob Purdy House	August 31, 1979 (#79001651)	60 Park Ave. 41°02′12″N 73°46′26″W	White Plains	
55	Quaker Ridge Golf Club	Quaker Ridge Golf Club	November 23, 2020 (#100005485)	146 Griffen Ave. 40°57′57″N 73°45′42″W	Scarsdale	
56	Putnam and Mellor Engine and Hose Company Firehouse	Putnam and Mellor Engine and Hose Company Firehouse	September 15, 1983 (#83001831)	46 S. Main St. 40°59′58″N 73°39′55″W	Port Chester	Torn down in 2007
57	Reid Hall, Manhattanville College	Reid Hall, Manhattanville College	March 22, 1974 (#74001321)	Manhattanville College, Purchase St. 41°01′56″N 73°42′58″W	Purchase	
58	Romer-Van Tassel House	Romer-Van Tassel House	November 25, 1994 (#94001373)	2121 Saw Mill River Rd. 41°02′39″N 73°49′40″W	Greenburgh	
59	Rye Meeting House	Rye Meeting House	January 14, 2011 (#10001134)	624 Milton Rd. 40°57′31″N 73°41′20″W	Rye	Original one room school house built in the 1830s, used as a chapel and later as a Quaker meeting house. Built in the Gothic Revival style.
60	Rye Town Park-Bathing Complex and Oakland Beach	Rye Town Park-Bathing Complex and Oakland Beach	April 18, 2003 (#03000252)	Forrest Ave., bet. Rye Beach and Dearborn Ave. 40°57′39″N 73°40′45″W	Rye	
61	St. Paul's Church National Historic Site	St. Paul's Church National Historic Site	October 15, 1966 (#66000580)	Eastchester; 40°53′36″N 73°49′33″W	Mount Vernon	
62	St. Peter's Episcopal Church	St. Peter's Episcopal Church	April 12, 2006 (#06000260)	19 Smith St. 41°00′14″N 73°40′01″W	Port Chester	
63	St. Thomas' Episcopal Church Complex	St. Thomas' Episcopal Church Complex	August 12, 2003 (#03000242)	158-168 W. Boston Post Rd. 40°56′53″N 73°44′07″W	Mamaroneck	
64	Scarsdale Railroad Station	Scarsdale Railroad Station	July 27, 2000 (#00000837)	Popham Rd. at Bronx River Pkwy. 40°59′22″N 73°48′32″W	Scarsdale	
65	Scarsdale Woman's Club	Scarsdale Woman's Club	February 29, 2008 (#08000110)	37 Drake Rd. 40°59′14″N 73°47′36″W	Scarsdale	
66	Skinny House	Skinny House	May 18, 2015 (#15000235)	175 Grand St. 40°57′17″N 73°44′33″W	Mamaroneck	Depression-era house built by African-American architect on small parcel
67	Soundview Manor	Soundview Manor	November 25, 2009 (#09000957)	283 Soundview Ave. 41°00′15″N 73°45′55″W	White Plains	
68	South Presbyterian Church	South Presbyterian Church	May 26, 2000 (#00000548)	343 Broadway; 41°00′53″N 73°52′22″W	Dobbs Ferry	1869 stone Gothic Revival church is the only known building by Julius Munckowitz, later involved in developing New York City's park system
69	Spanish American War Monument to the 71st Infantry Regiment	Spanish American War Monument to the 71st Infantry Regiment	January 14, 2011 (#10001133)	Jackson Avenue & Saw Mill River Road; 41°00′38″N 73°51′50″W	Greenburgh	
70	John Stevens House	John Stevens House	April 26, 1972 (#72000919)	29 W. 4th St. 40°54′15″N 73°50′10″W	Mount Vernon	
71	Stony Hill Cemetery	Stony Hill Cemetery	June 25, 1999 (#99000753)	Buckout Rd. 41°03′18″N 73°44′59″W	Harrison	
72	Trinity Episcopal Church Complex	Trinity Episcopal Church Complex	September 1, 1998 (#97001494)	335 Fourth Ave. 40°54′11″N 73°50′02″W	Mount Vernon	
73	Tuckahoe High School	Tuckahoe High School	February 24, 2010 (#10000045)	65 Siwanoy Blvd. 40°56′31″N 73°48′49″W	Eastchester	
74	US Post Office-Bronxville	US Post Office-Bronxville	November 17, 1988 (#88002459)	119 Pondfield Rd. 40°56′18″N 73°49′57″W	Bronxville	part of the US Post Offices in New York State, 1858-1943, TR
75	US Post Office-Dobbs Ferry	US Post Office-Dobbs Ferry	November 17, 1988 (#88002484)	120 Main St. 41°00′55″N 73°52′30″W	Dobbs Ferry	One of many New Deal-era Colonial Revival post offices in the state; one of only three with parapeted gables and window keystones; part of the US Post Offices in New York State, 1858-1943, TR
76	US Post Office-Harrison	US Post Office-Harrison	May 11, 1989 (#88002524)	258 Halstead Ave. 40°58′07″N 73°42′51″W	Harrison	part of the US Post Offices in New York State, 1858-1943, TR
77	US Post Office-Larchmont	US Post Office-Larchmont	May 11, 1989 (#88002341)	1 Chatsworth Ave. 40°55′48″N 73°45′05″W	Larchmont	part of the US Post Offices in New York State, 1858-1943, TR
78	US Post Office-Mount Vernon	US Post Office-Mount Vernon	May 11, 1989 (#88002355)	15 S. First St. 40°54′40″N 73°50′02″W	Mount Vernon	part of the US Post Offices in New York State, 1858-1943, TR
79	US Post Office-Port Chester	US Post Office-Port Chester	May 11, 1989 (#88002406)	245 Westchester Ave. 41°00′12″N 73°40′07″W	Port Chester	part of the US Post Offices in New York State, 1858-1943, TR
80	US Post Office-Rye	US Post Office-Rye	May 11, 1989 (#88002426)	41 Purdy Ave. 40°59′04″N 73°40′59″W	Rye	part of the US Post Offices in New York State, 1858-1943, TR
81	US Post Office-Scarsdale	US Post Office-Scarsdale	May 11, 1989 (#88002428)	29 Chase Rd. 40°59′24″N 73°48′22″W	Scarsdale	part of the US Post Offices in New York State, 1858-1943, TR
82	Villa Lewaro	Villa Lewaro	May 11, 1976 (#76001289)	N. Broadway; 41°02′00″N 73°51′56″W	Irvington	Home of Madame C.J. Walker, hair-care products tycoon and first African-American millionaire.
83	Walter's Hot Dog Stand	Walter's Hot Dog Stand	June 11, 2010 (#10000338)	937 Palmer Ave. 40°56′35″N 73°44′49″W	Mamaroneck	1928 imitation pagoda
84	William E. Ward House	William E. Ward House	November 7, 1976 (#76001294)	Comly Ave. 41°01′34″N 73°40′03″W	Rye Brook	First reinforced concrete structure in U.S., built in the 1870s on state line. Extends into Greenwich, Connecticut
85	Washington Irving Memorial	Washington Irving Memorial	September 8, 2000 (#00001062)	Broadway and Sunnyside Ln. 41°02′53″N 73°51′43″W	Irvington	Daniel Chester French-sculpted memorial to writer who gave Irvington its name, erected in the late 1920s.
86	Wayside Cottage	Wayside Cottage	May 1, 1981 (#81000418)	1039 Post Rd. 40°59′32″N 73°47′40″W	Scarsdale	
87	White Plains Armory	White Plains Armory	April 16, 1980 (#80002796)	35 S. Broadway; 41°01′53″N 73°45′47″W	White Plains	
88	White Plains Rural Cemetery	White Plains Rural Cemetery	September 19, 2003 (#03000247)	167 N. Broadway; 41°02′50″N 73°46′20″W	White Plains	
89	Albert E. and Emily Wilson House	Albert E. and Emily Wilson House	April 18, 2007 (#07000330)	617 Brook St. 40°57′16″N 73°43′46″W	Mamaroneck	
90	Winged Foot Golf Club	Winged Foot Golf Club	June 12, 2019 (#100004089)	851 Fenimore Rd. 40°57′28″N 73°45′13″W	Mamaroneck	Country club with two golf courses completed in 1923 is last designed by A.W. Tillinghast that features a Clifford Charles Wendehack clubhouse; has hosted several U.S. Opens. It was designated a National Historic Landmark in 2024.
91	Woman's Club of White Plains	Woman's Club of White Plains	October 20, 2010 (#10000853)	305 Ridgeway; 41°00′23″N 73°44′54″W	White Plains	
92	Zion Episcopal Church	Zion Episcopal Church	December 21, 2020 (#100005921)	55 Cedar St. 41°00′56″N 73°52′22″W	Dobbs Ferry	

== Former listing ==
	Name on the Register	Image	Date listed	Date removed	Location	City or town	Description
1	Westchester County Courthouse Complex		January 17, 1975 (#77001581)	September 21, 1977	Roughly bounded by Grand St., Martine Ave., Court and Main Sts.	White Plains	Demolished in 1977.

== See also ==
- National Register of Historic Places listings in New York
- National Register of Historic Places listings in Westchester County, New York
- National Register of Historic Places listings in New Rochelle, New York
- National Register of Historic Places listings in Yonkers, New York
