= East Irvington School =

- U.S. National Register of Historic Places
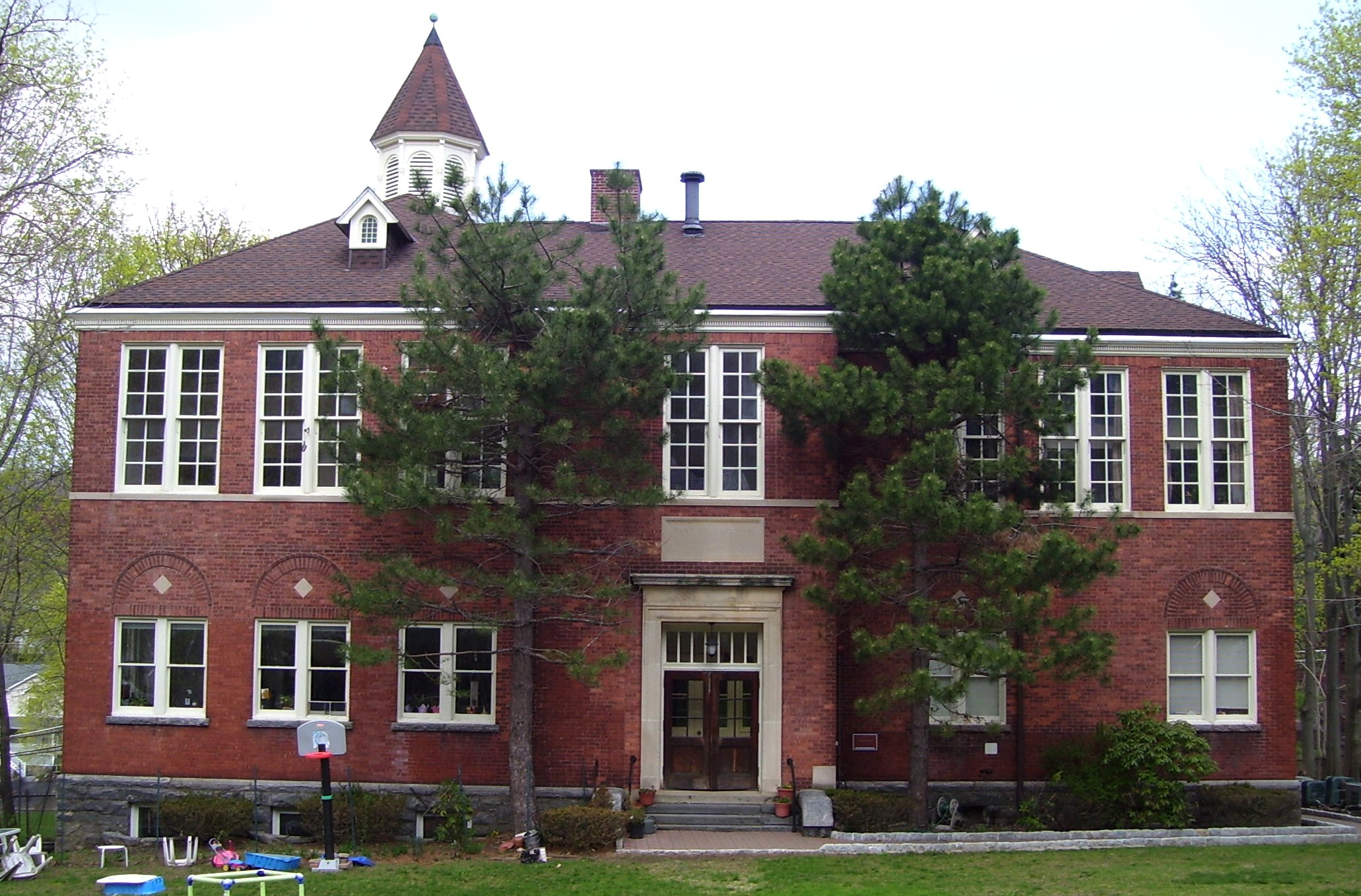
- Front elevation of the school, seen in 2011

- Location within New York Location within the United States
- Location: Mountain Road; East Irvington, New York
- Nearest city: White Plains
- Coordinates: 41°02′47″N 73°50′52″W
- Area: 1.7 acres (0.69 ha)
- Built: 1891
- NRHP reference No.: 83004216
- Added to NRHP: October 6, 1983

The East Irvington School, or East Irvington Public School, is a former school building that served the neighborhood of that name in the town of Greenburgh, New York, United States as part of the Irvington School District. It was built in 1891 to educate the children of a growing population of Irish American laborers, and was expanded in 1925. The building continued to be used as a school until 1972. The brick building on Mountain Lane, with a rear entrance on Taxter Road, has since been converted to a condominium, but remains the oldest standing school building in the area. It was added to the National Register of Historic Places in 1983.

== Building ==
The two-story brick building sits on a dressed-rock foundation exposed at the rear. A thin stone course divides the two stories. The school's name appears in molded concrete above its main entrance, also surrounded with a concrete entablature. The windows use stone trim. The rear entrance has a brick, stone and concrete porch. The asphalt-shingled hipped roof has gabled, louvered dormers on the front and back and an off-center cupola.

Inside, much of the building remained as it originally was when used as a school, at least at the time of its addition to the Register. It is heavy on wood, particularly oak, paneling and wainscoting.

== History ==
As the nearby village of Irvington grew in the late 19th century, due to the completion of the Hudson River Railroad, it became home to a number of wealthy residents, who imitated the village's namesake, Washington Irving, by buying, building or expanding large houses along the river. This activity, and the maintenance of those houses, required a large labor force. Irish immigrants, already drawn to the area by jobs on the railroad, the docks and the building of the Croton Aqueduct, filled them. They settled in a previously rural area to the east of Irvington that quickly came to be known as "Little Dublin".

Irvington had built its first public school in 1872 in the village, but that wasn't enough to handle the pupils from further inland. Accordingly, East Irvington School was built in 1891 as a single-story building, educating students from kindergarten to eighth grade, including some from the village.

By 1925 continued population growth led to the addition of the second story. In the early 1950s, what was now the Irvington Union Free School District changed its grade structure to the district's primary school, educating all students from kindergarten to second grade, but by 1955 it was back to its original grades, but reverted again to limited grade use in 1960. The school was finally closed in 1972. The building stood vacant for a decade before being converted into a condominium in the 1980s. The former school yard is now East Irvington Park.

== See also ==
- National Register of Historic Places listings in southern Westchester County, New York
