= Peoples National Bank and Trust Company Building =

Historic commercial building in New York, United States

- U.S. National Register of Historic Places
- New York State Register of Historic Places
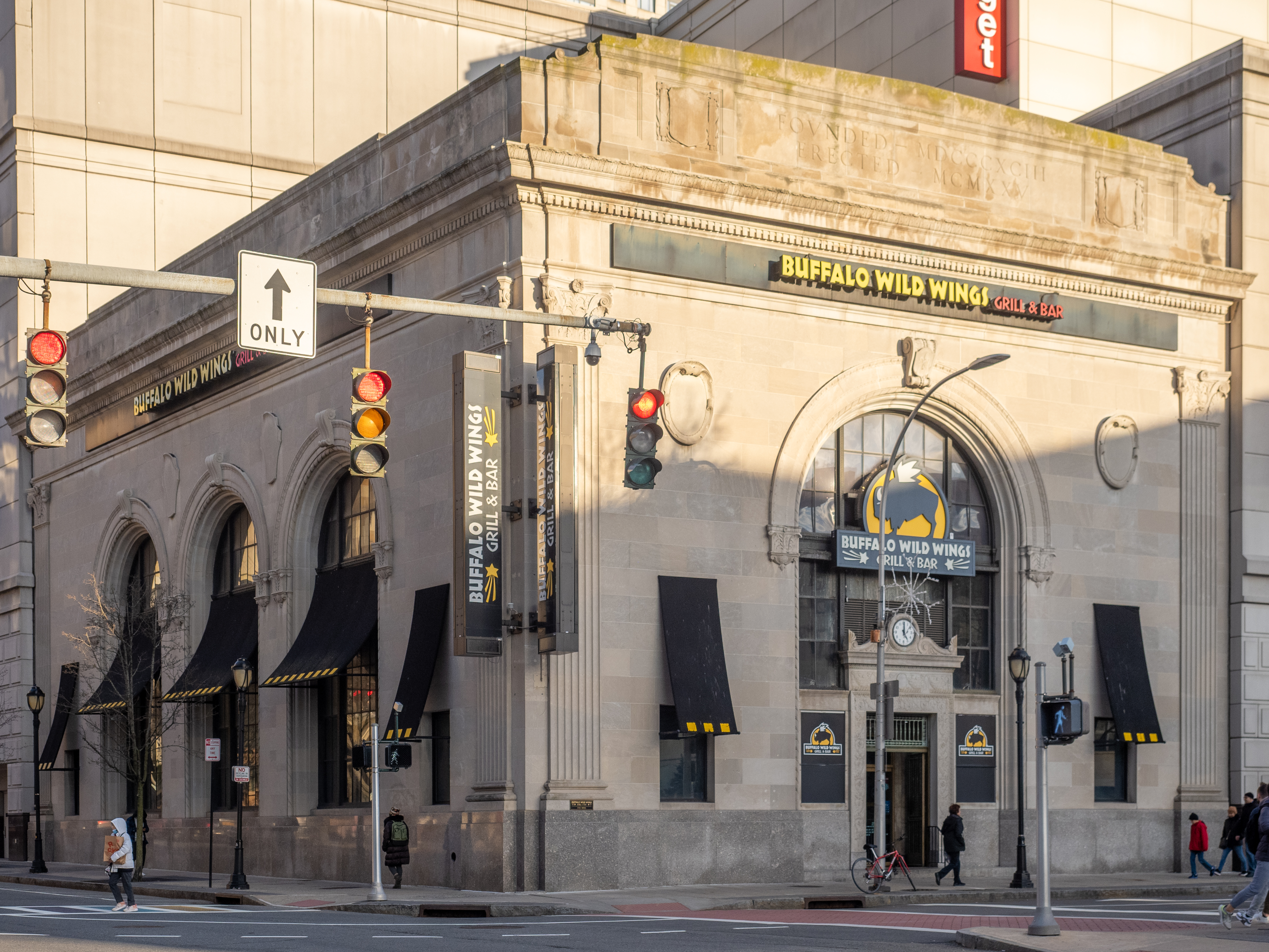

- Location within New York Location within the United States
- Location: 31 Mamaroneck Ave., White Plains, New York
- Coordinates: 41°1′57″N 73°45′59″W
- Area: less than one acre
- Built: 1929
- Architect: Zoller, Harold P.; Goble, Frank N., Inc.
- Architectural style: Classical Revival
- NRHP reference No.: 00001119
- NYSRHP No.: 11943.000769

Significant dates
- Added to NRHP: September 14, 2000
- Designated NYSRHP: April 5, 2000

Peoples National Bank and Trust Company Building is a historic bank building located at White Plains, Westchester County, New York. It was built in 1929 and is a nine-story commercial building in the Classical Revival style. It has an L-shaped plan and features highly finished limestone and brick materials and terra cotta ornament at the street level. Above the two-story base, the building remaining stories are built of brick with limestone trim.

It was added to the National Register of Historic Places in 2000.

== See also ==
- National Register of Historic Places listings in southern Westchester County, New York
