= Putnam and Mellor Engine and Hose Company Firehouse =

- U.S. National Register of Historic Places
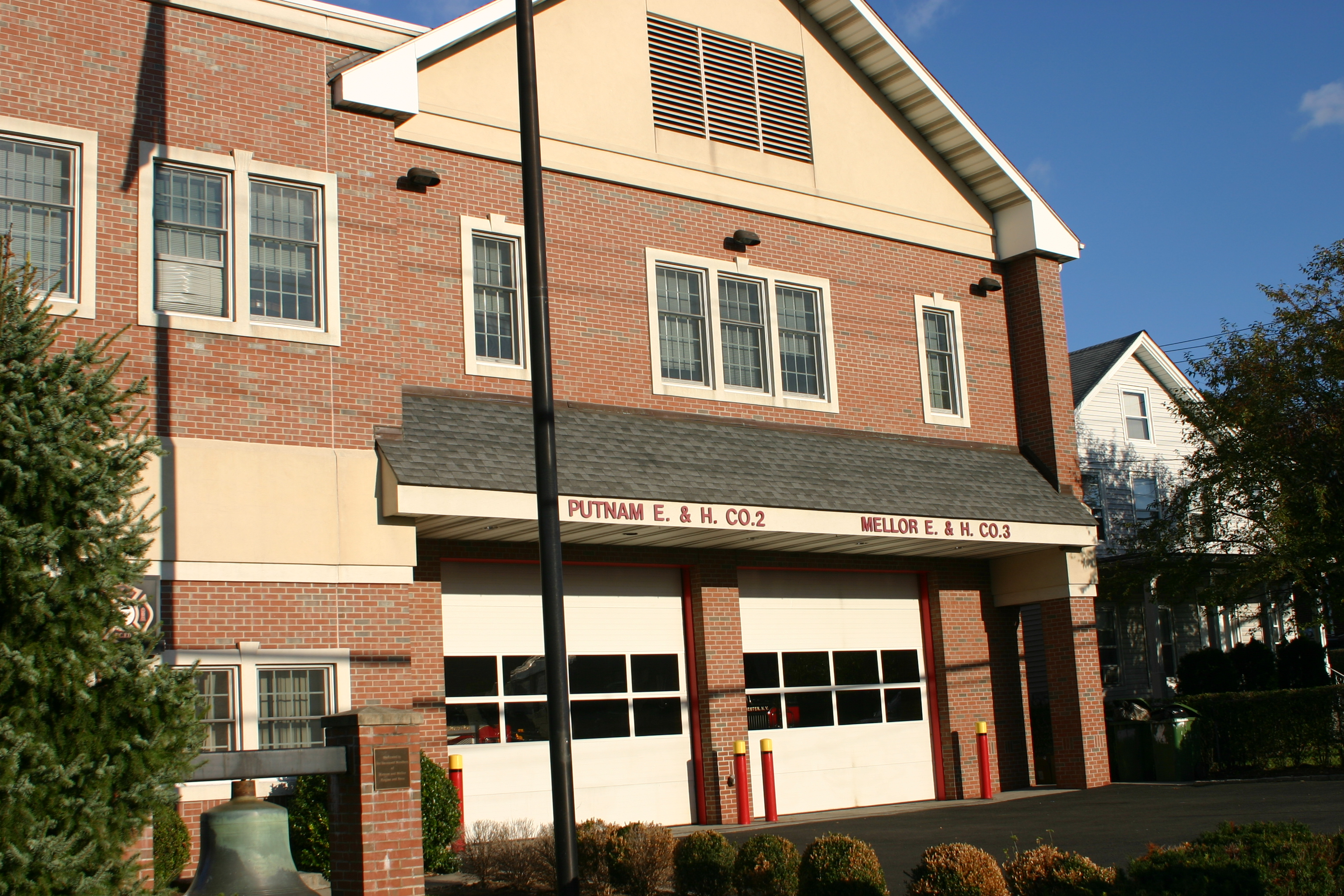
- The 2001 replacement for the 1888-built Putnam and Mellor Engine and Hose Company firehouse

- Location within New York Location within the United States
- Location: 46 S. Main St., Port Chester, New York
- Coordinates: 40°59′58″N 73°39′55″W
- Area: less than one acre
- Built: 1888
- Architect: Slater, Howard G.; Thomas, W.A.
- Architectural style: Queen Anne
- NRHP reference No.: 83001831
- Added to NRHP: September 15, 1983

Putnam and Mellor Engine and Hose Company Firehouse was a historic fire station located at Port Chester, Westchester County, New York. It was built in 1888 and is a three-story, three bay wide, masonry building in the Queen Anne style. It is constructed of red brick with stone stringcourses and terra cotta decoration. It features a low hipped roof with decorative gable ends and a corner bell tower.

It was added to the National Register of Historic Places in 1983.

The official name of this firehouse was the South Main Street Firehouse. The address was 46 South Main Street, Port Chester, NY. As described above, it housed the Putnam Engine & Hose Company, No.2 (founded Oct. 1854) and the Mellor Engine & Hose Company, No.3. The fire engines for these companies are Engine 63 and Engine 61, respectively.

In 1995 the rear wall of the South Main Street Firehouse collapsed, rendering the firehouse uninhabitable. Putnam and Mellor were temporarily displaced and eventually relocated to their current home – the South End Fire Station (51-53 Grace Church Street, Port Chester, NY). This new firehouse was completed in 2001.

Despite public outcry and despite being on the National Register, on November 17, 2007 the South Main Street Firehouse was demolished.

== See also ==
- National Register of Historic Places listings in southern Westchester County, New York
