= United States Post Office (Mount Vernon, New York) =

- US Post Office-Mount Vernon
- U.S. National Register of Historic Places
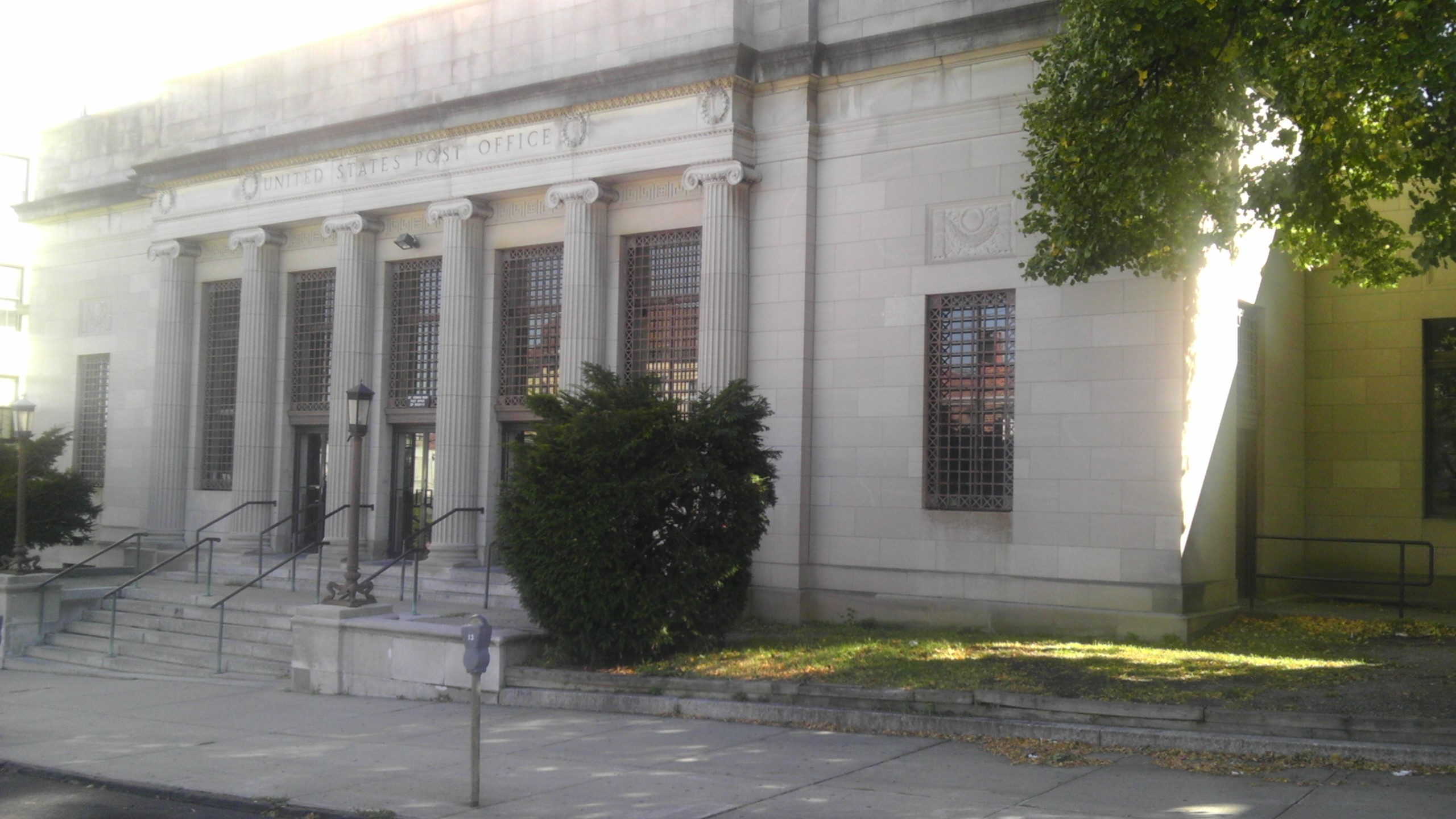

- Location within New York Location within the United States
- Location: 15 S. First St., Mount Vernon, New York
- Coordinates: 40°54′40″N 73°50′1″W
- Area: less than one acre
- Built: 1915
- Architect: Wenderoth, Oscar; U.S. Treasury Department
- Architectural style: Classical Revival
- MPS: US Post Offices in New York State, 1858-1943, TR
- NRHP reference No.: 88002355
- Added to NRHP: May 11, 1989

US Post Office-Mount Vernon is a historic post office building located at Mount Vernon in Westchester County, New York, United States. It was built in 1915 and is one of a number of post offices designed by the Office of the Supervising Architect under direction of Oscar Wenderoth. It is a two to three story, symmetrical building faced with limestone in the Classical Revival style. It is composed of a five bay central section with flanking one bay recessed wings.

It was listed on the National Register of Historic Places in 1989.

== See also ==
- National Register of Historic Places listings in southern Westchester County, New York
