= Bush-Lyon Homestead =

Historic house in New York, United States

- U.S. National Register of Historic Places
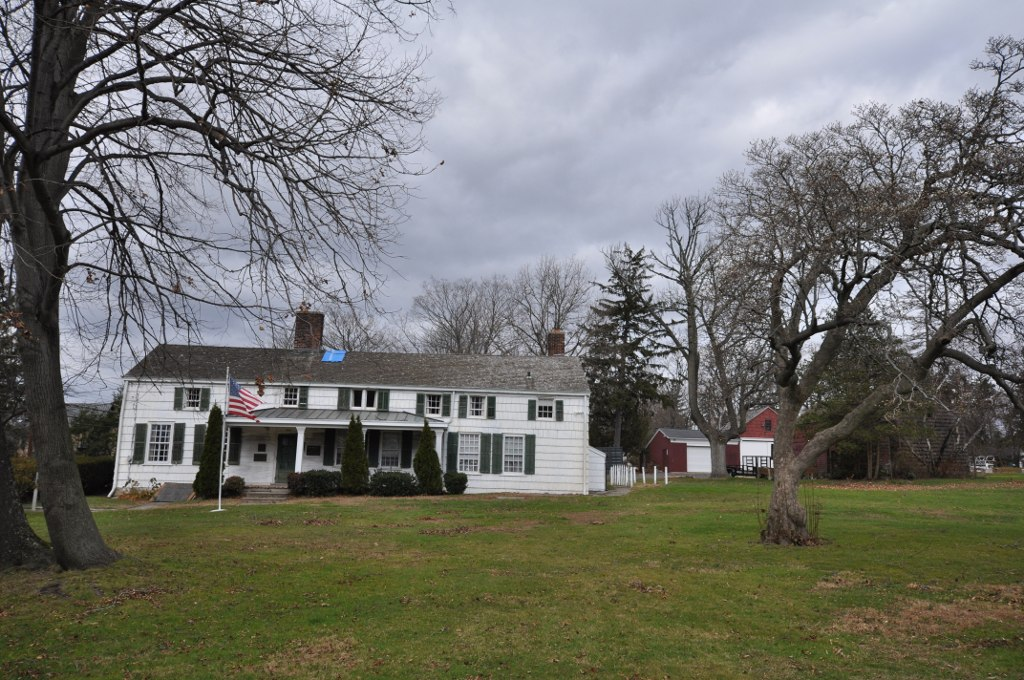
- Bush-Lyon Homestead, November 2012

- Location within New York Location within the United States
- Location: John Lyon Park, King St., Port Chester, New York
- Coordinates: 41°0′48″N 73°40′3″W
- Area: less than one acre
- Built: 1720
- NRHP reference No.: 82003412
- Added to NRHP: April 22, 1982

Bush-Lyon Homestead is a historic home located at Port Chester, Westchester County, New York. The earliest part was built about 1720. It is a 1 1/2-story, five-by-two-bay, frame residence faced in shingles and clapboards. It has a center stone chimney. The rear kitchen wing and 1-story north wing were added about 1800 and the house given its saltbox configuration. In the mid-19th century, the present porch was added with its Doric order piers and a 1-story, gable-roofed wing added. Also on the property are a carriage house, former slave quarters, and a storage building/corn crib.

The property was purchased by the village in 1925 from the Bush estate. One of the reasons for the purchase was its association with Revolutionary War hero Israel Putnam: the house served as headquarters for General Putnam in 1777–1778. It was added to the National Register of Historic Places in 1982.

History of the Homestead : The home may have been built by John Lyon II, born 1693, who had considerable farm land that included the area now called Lyon Park. There is considerable evidence that the house existed before the marriage of his daughter Ruth Lyon to Abraham Bush, who made the house their homestead. It may have been occupied by one or more of John Lyon II's sons.

John Lyon II's children were: John Lyon (1713-1790); Roger Lyon (1715-1797); Elizabeth (Lyon) Treadwell (1718-1772); James Lyon (1720-1804); Ruth Lyon (1724-1802).

Ruth Lyon and Abraham Bush were married c.1744. They had seven children, all born at the house between 1747 and 1766. Their son Gilbert Bush (1753-1831) married Sabrina Seymour and had one daughter Mary Emeline Bush (born about 1799, died 1893), who inherited the house. Emeline married Gershom Bulkley of Port Chester, from a family of sea merchants in the area. They had seven children born in the house, all of whom pre-deceased Mary Emeline. Upon her death, questions arose as to the ownership and preservation of the home, and after a series of court hearings involving distance relatives, the house and property were purchased by the Village of Port Chester in 1925 and preserved as a park. The Port Chester Historical Society maintains its headquarters at the homestead and welcomes any visitors to tour the homestead when the homestead is open to the public.

== See also ==
- National Register of Historic Places listings in southern Westchester County, New York
- Saltbox house
