= Percy Grainger Home and Studio =

Historic house in New York, United States

- U.S. National Register of Historic Places
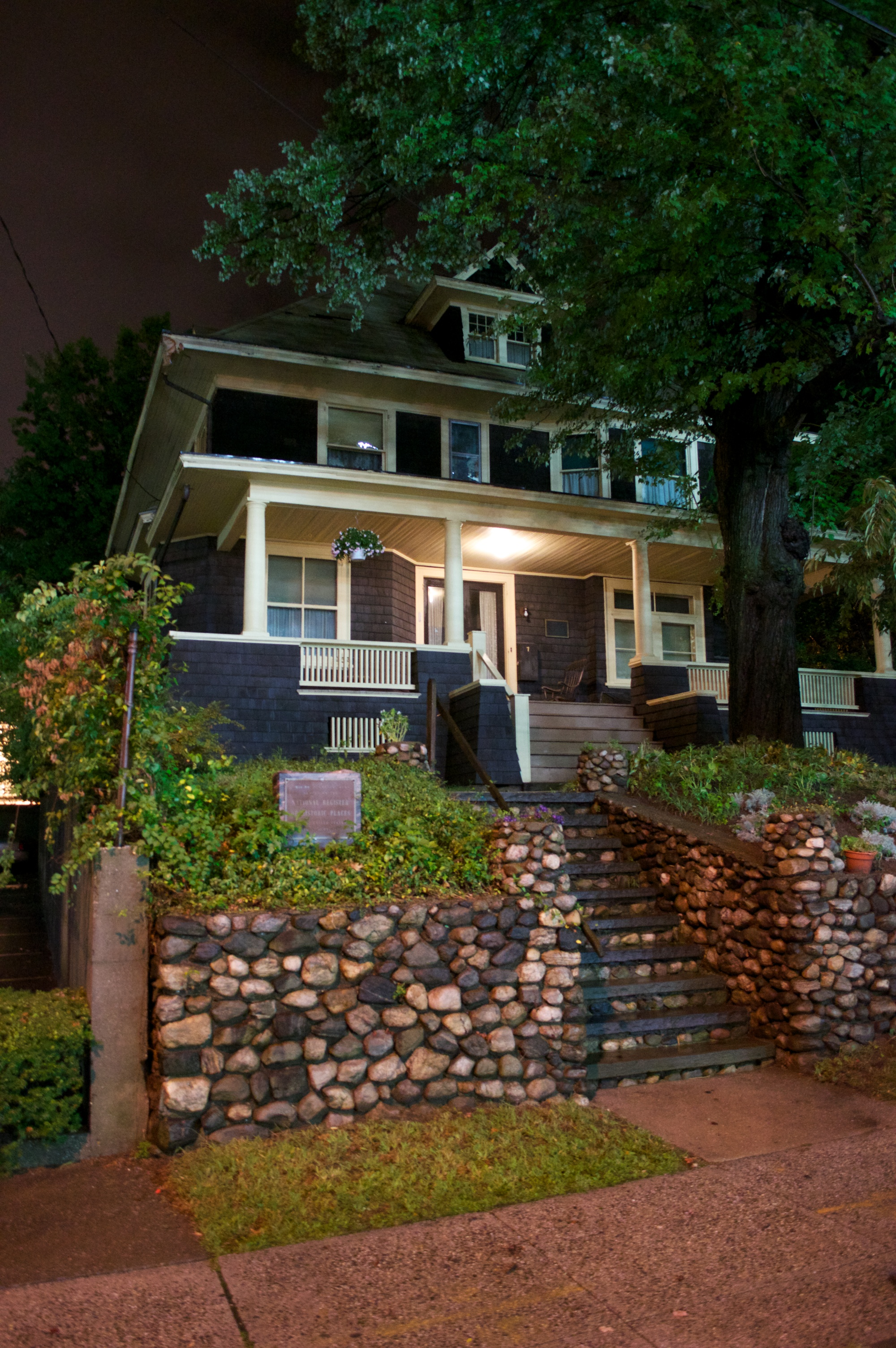
- The home and studio in September 2013.

- Location within New York Location within the United States
- Interactive map showing the location of Percy Grainger House
- Location: 7 Cromwell Pl., White Plains, New York
- Coordinates: 41°1′38.5″N 73°46′1″W
- Area: less than one acre
- Built: 1893
- Architect: Cromwell, David
- Architectural style: Late 19th And Early 20th Century American Movements, American Foursquare
- NRHP reference No.: 93000234
- Added to NRHP: April 8, 1993

Percy Grainger Home and Studio is a historic home located at White Plains, Westchester County, New York. It was built in 1893 and is a two-story, three-bay-wide dwelling with a pyramidal hipped roof in the American Foursquare style. It features a full-width, one-story porch supported by four Doric order columns. The main entrance is a Dutch door. It was the home of musician Percy Grainger from 1921 to his death in 1961.

It was added to the National Register of Historic Places in 1993.

== See also ==
- National Register of Historic Places listings in southern Westchester County, New York
