= Presbyterian Rest for Convalescents =

- U.S. National Register of Historic Places
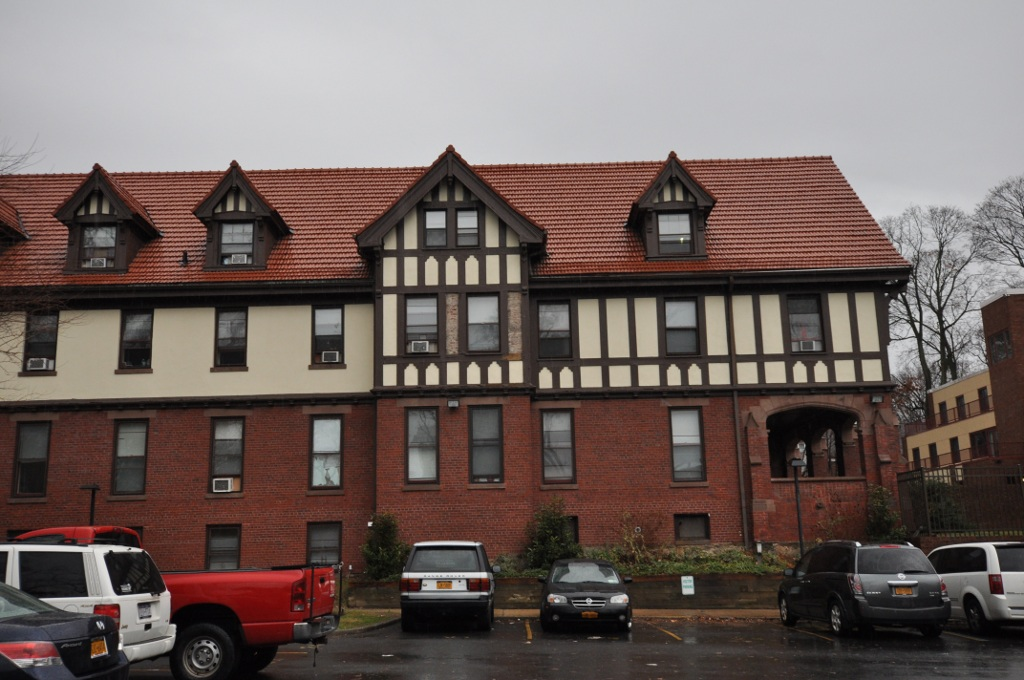
- One wing of the complex; modern buildings are to right

- Location within New York Location within the United States
- Location: 69 N. Broadway, White Plains, New York
- Coordinates: 41°02′19″N 73°46′03″W
- Area: less than one acre
- Architectural style: Tudor Revival
- NRHP reference No.: 11000230
- Added to NRHP: April 27, 2011

Presbyterian Rest for Convalescents, also known as the Y.W.C.A. of White Plains and Central Westchester, is a historic convalescent home located at White Plains, Westchester County, New York. It was built in 1913, and is a 3 1/2-story, H-shaped building in the Tudor Revival style. The two lower stories are in brick and the upper stories in half-timbering and stucco. It has a tiled gable roof with dormer windows. The section connecting the two wings includes the main entrance, which features stone facing and Tudor arches. The connected Acheson Wallace Hall was built in 1972. The building housed a convalescent home until 1967, after which it was acquired by the Y.W.C.A. and operated as a residence for women.

It was added to the National Register of Historic Places in 2011.

== See also ==
- National Register of Historic Places listings in southern Westchester County, New York
