= Woman's Club of White Plains =

- U.S. National Register of Historic Places
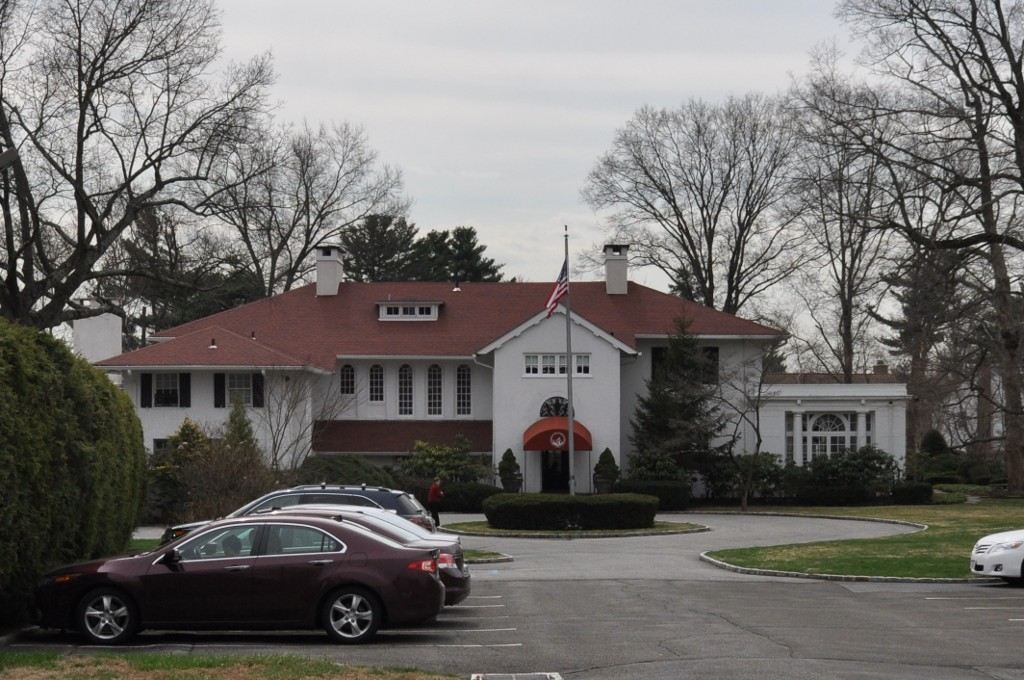

- Location within New York Location within the United States
- Location: 305 Ridgeway, White Plains, New York
- Coordinates: 41°0′23″N 73°44′54″W
- Area: 4 acres (1.6 ha)
- Built: 1910, 1932
- Architectural style: Italian Renaissance Revival
- NRHP reference No.: 10000853
- Added to NRHP: October 20, 2010

Woman's Club of White Plains, originally known as the Thomas H. Kerr residence, is a historic clubhouse located at White Plains, Westchester County, New York. It was built in 1910 as a residence and enlarged in 1932, after being acquired as a clubhouse for the Contemporary Club. McKim, Mead and (Sanford) White were the architects of this property, which originally had 41 acres, including a small farm and extensive orchards. It is a two-story, stuccoed, poured concrete building in the Italian Renaissance Revival style. It features a broad hipped roof, deep overhanging eaves, and prominent brick chimneys. It has large glass-enclosed porches at each end of the house.

The murals in the dining room were shipped from a villa in the Mediterranean where they were hand painted in the late 1800s. These murals were hidden under shellac in the club living room until discovered and restored. The graciously appointed house reflects the style of its original era, complete with library, tea room, and period lighting fixtures. However, the edifice is constantly being updated, to keep current in this 21st century. Maintenance of its gardens is overseen by club members.

The residence has hosted notable speakers on its stage, including Eleanor Roosevelt, Helen Keller, Tallulah Bankhead, Carl Sandburg, David McCullough, and Admiral Richard Byrd.

In 1913, American Homes and Gardens magazine said, "It would be difficult to imagine a country home of greater beauty and refinement than this beautiful place."

Because the Woman's Club was a unique and integral part of its community, and because of its exceptionally well-preserved architecture, the house was added to the National Register of Historic Places in 2010.

== See also ==
- National Register of Historic Places listings in southern Westchester County, New York
