= Widow Haviland's Tavern =

Historic commercial building in New York, United States

- U.S. National Register of Historic Places
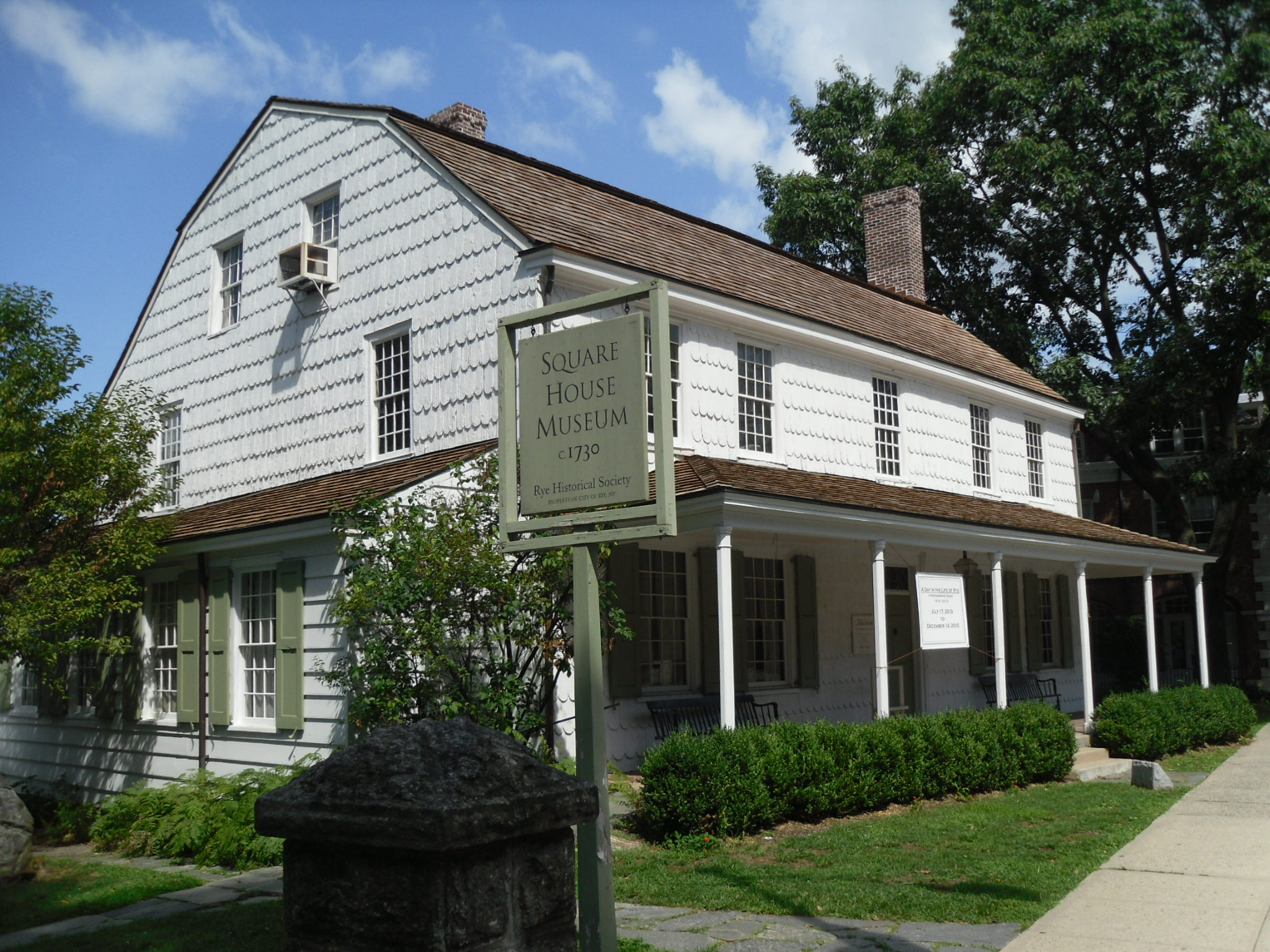
- Widow Haviland's Tavern, July 2010

- Location within New York Location within the United States
- Location: Purchase St., Rye, New York
- Coordinates: 40°58′55″N 73°41′5″W
- Area: 0.3 acres (0.12 ha)
- Built: c. 1730
- NRHP reference No.: 74001322
- Added to NRHP: April 16, 1974

Widow Haviland's Tavern, also known as Square House Museum, is a historic inn and tavern building located at Rye, Westchester County, New York. It is a frame, gambrel roofed building with portions believed to date to the early 18th century, about 1730.

It opened as a tavern about 1760. Operating as an inn during the American Revolution under Dr. Ebenezer Haviland—a leader of local Patriots and Continental Army surgeon—it served both as a lodging for travelers and as a meeting place for supporters of the Continental Congress. John Adams and Samuel Adams (1774), George Washington (1789), and General Lafayette (1824) are among the well-known customers.

It ceased use as a public house about 1830, then was a private residence until 1903, after which it became the Rye municipal hall. It has been used since 1964 as a local history museum. As a museum, the building is interpreted as a 1770s–1780s tavern operated by Dr. Haviland and later his widow, Tamar Haviland.

It was added to the National Register of Historic Places in 1974.

== See also ==
- National Register of Historic Places listings in southern Westchester County, New York
