= Westchester County Courthouse Complex =

- Formerly listed on the U.S. National Register of Historic Places
- Location within New York
- Location: Roughly bounded by Grand St., Martine Ave., Court and Main Sts., White Plains, New York
- Coordinates: 41°1′54″N 73°46′7″W
- Area: 4.9 acres (2.0 ha)
- Built: 1857, 1893, 1904, 1918
- NRHP reference No.: 77001581

Significant dates
- Added to NRHP: January 17, 1975
- Removed from NRHP: January 1, 1977

The Westchester County Courthouse Complex was a historic Courthouse complex of six buildings in White Plains, New York. It included the historic courthouse (1857), Hall of Records (1893), Supreme Court (1904), and a large neo-classical addition (1915-1917). The neiclassical addition was designed by noted architect Benjamin W. Morris, and featured four-story ionic pilasters along the facade.

It was listed on the National Register of Historic Places in 1975, and delisted in 1977 after being demolished.
