= Soundview Manor =

Historic house in New York, United States

- U.S. National Register of Historic Places
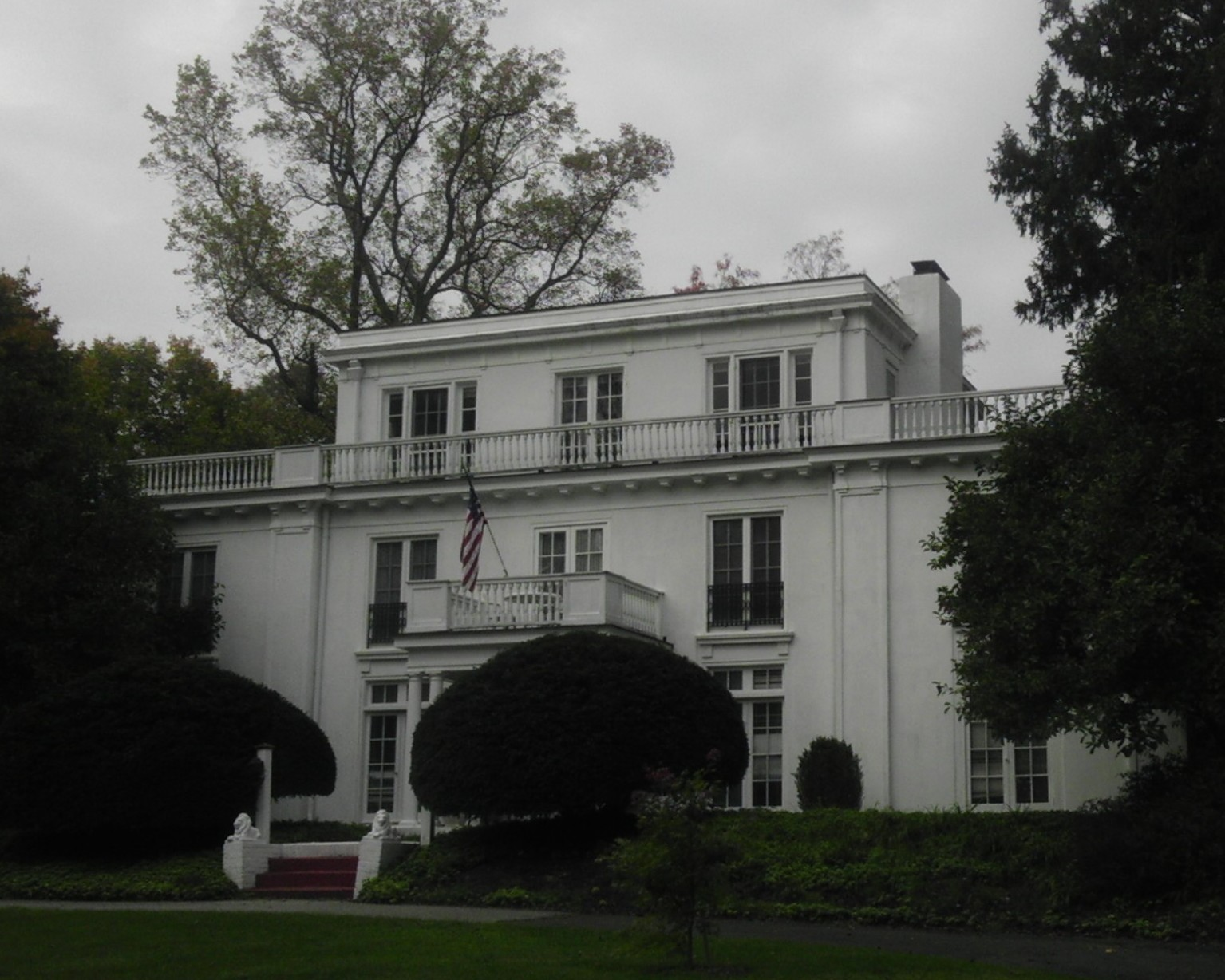

- Location within New York Location within the United States
- Location: 283 Soundview Ave., White Plains, New York
- Coordinates: 41°0′15″N 73°45′55″W
- Area: 4 acres (1.6 ha)
- Built: 1920
- Architect: Patterson, Chester A.
- Architectural style: Classical Revival
- NRHP reference No.: 09000957
- Added to NRHP: November 25, 2009

Soundview Manor is a historic home located on four acres in White Plains, Westchester County, New York. Built in 1920 by landowner Robert B. Dula, and is a stuccoed, frame building in the Classical Revival style. It is L-shaped and has a three-story, three-bay central section flanked by two-story, one-bay blocks on each side. The house has flat roofs, with prominent balustrades. The flat roofed front porch is supported by Tuscan order columns.

It remains privately owned. (2026)

It was added to the National Register of Historic Places in 2009.

== See also ==
- National Register of Historic Places listings in southern Westchester County, New York
