= Bar Building =

Historic commercial building in New York, United States

- U.S. National Register of Historic Places
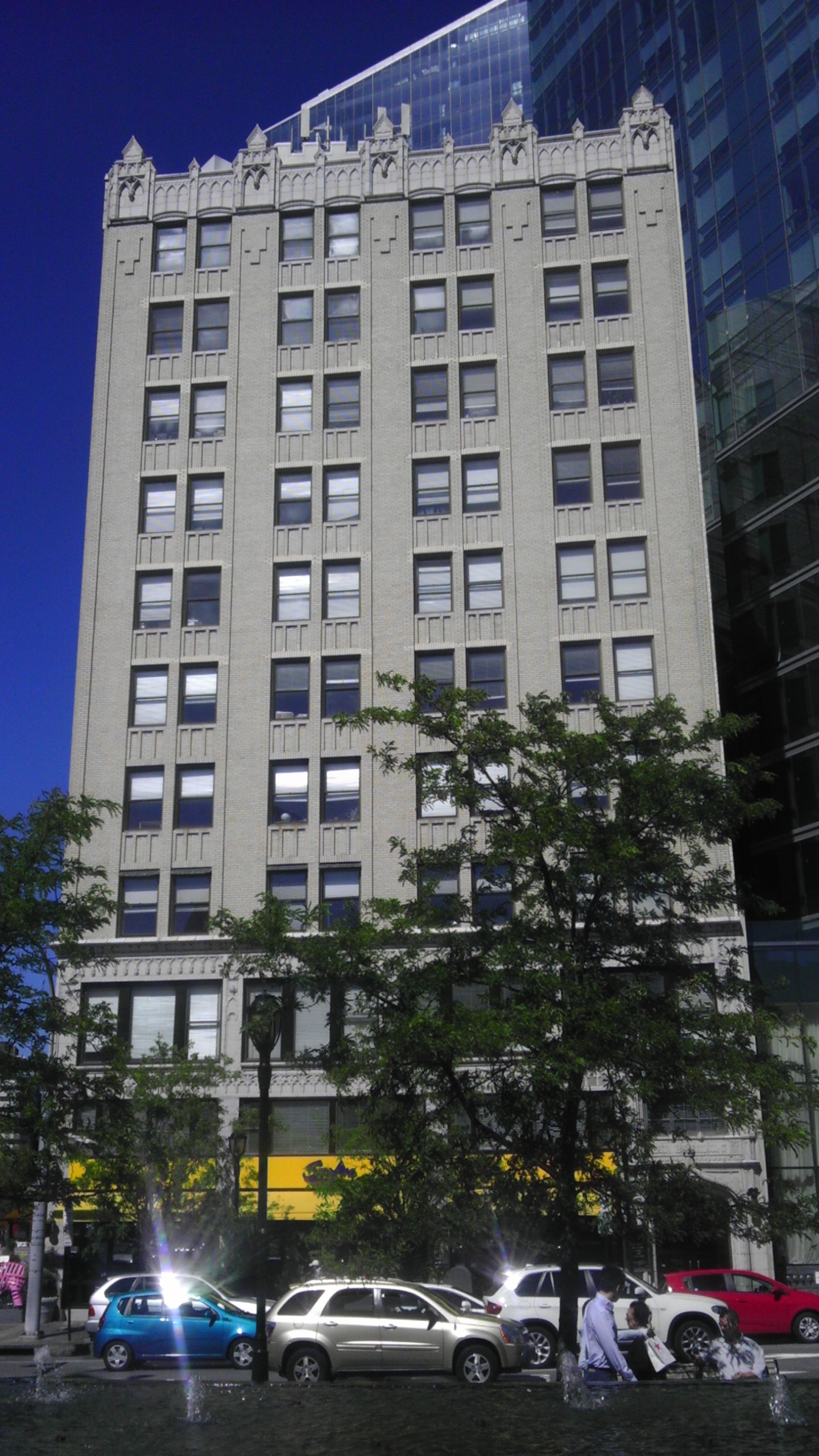

- Location within New York Location within the United States
- Location: 199 Main St., White Plains, New York
- Coordinates: 41°1′57″N 73°46′3″W
- Area: less than one acre
- Built: 1926
- Architect: Benjamin I. Levitan
- Architectural style: Early Commercial
- NRHP reference No.: 07000331
- Added to NRHP: May 17, 2007

The Bar Building is a historic commercial building designed by architect Benjamin Levitan and located at White Plains, Westchester County, New York.

== Description and history ==
It was built in 1926 and is a ten-story, 125-foot-tall building. Above the tenth floor is a two-story, recessed penthouse. The penthouse floors are enclosed with a crenellated parapet which originally housed the short lived "City Club" as well as the structure's water-tank. It is a steel-frame building clad in face brick and cement with Neo-Gothic and Art Deco terra cotta ornamentation. Its crenellated tower originally had glazed windows encircling its three sides. These were later bricked in. When completed, The Bar Building was the tallest structure between New York City and Albany, NY. Since 1990, the building's penthouse has been the location of J.J. Sedelmaier Productions, Inc., an animation and design studio. When the building was threatened with demolition through eminent domain in the early 2000s, Sedelmaier himself was instrumental in working with the White Plains Historical Society and NY State in insuring the preservation and listing of the structure on the National Register of Historic Places.

It was added to the National Register of Historic Places on May 17, 2007.

== See also ==
- National Register of Historic Places listings in southern Westchester County, New York
