= Jacob Purdy House =

Historic house in New York, United States

- U.S. National Register of Historic Places
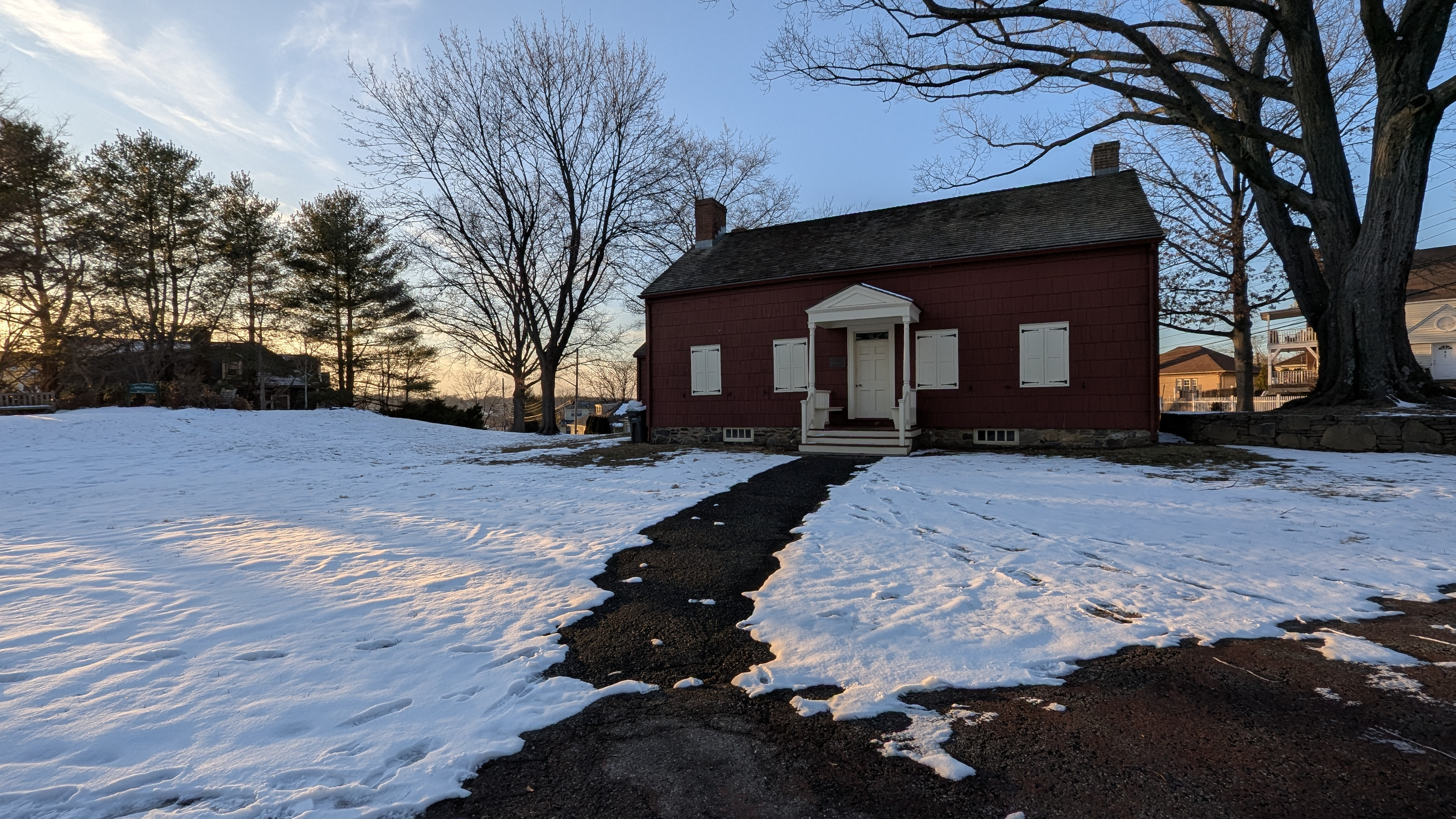
- Interactive map showing the Jacob Purdy House’s location
- Location: 60 Park Ave., White Plains, New York
- Coordinates: 41°2′12.9″N 73°46′23.1″W
- Area: less than one acre
- Built: 1721
- NRHP reference No.: 79001651
- Added to NRHP: August 31, 1979

The Jacob Purdy House was used as General George Washington's headquarters in 1778 and possibly in 1776 during the Battle of White Plains in the American Revolutionary War. Originally constructed by Samuel Horton, it was purchased by Jacob Purdy's father, Samuel Purdy in 1730. It came into the possession of Jacob Purdy about 1785, in the aftermath of the war when some of the family had fled as United Empire Loyalists.

In the 1960s it was repaired and restored, and in 1973 the structure was moved to its present location. A further renovation was conducted around 1980, involving both professional craftsmen and local teenagers in an apprentice program. The Jacob Purdy House is now the headquarters of the White Plains Historical Society. The house was listed on the National Register of Historic Places in 1979.

== See also ==
- List of Washington's Headquarters during the Revolutionary War
