= White Plains, New York =

City in New York, United States

- City
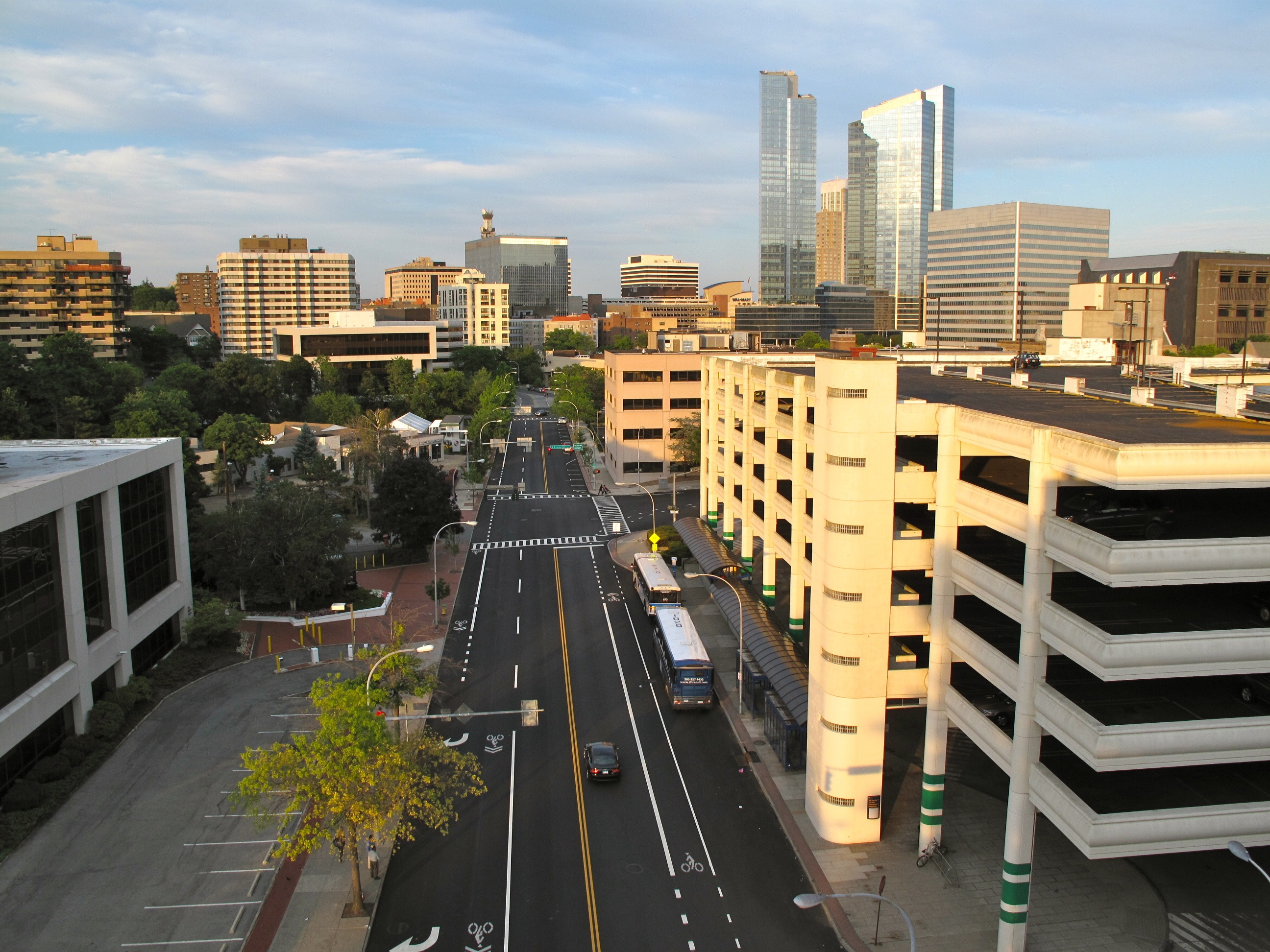
- The White Plains skyline

- Flag Seal
- Nickname: The Birthplace of New York State
- Motto: Latin: Semper Fidelis (Always Faithful)
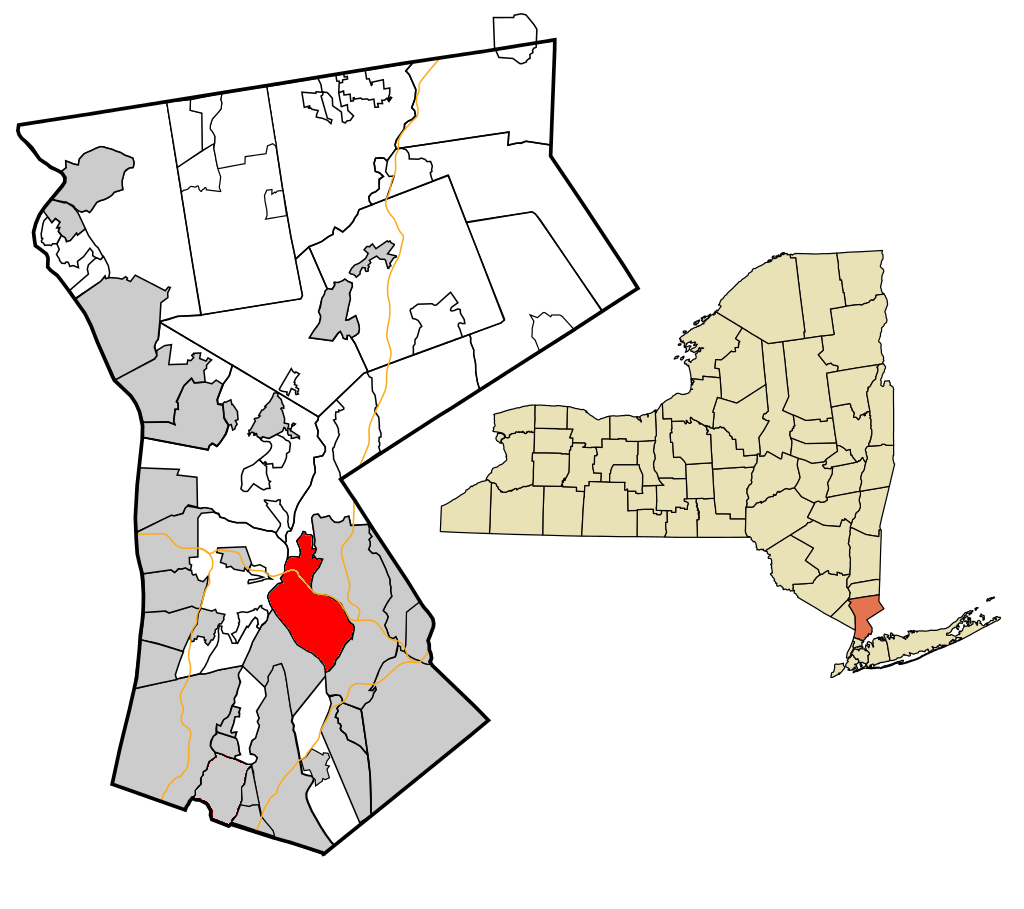
- Location of White Plains within Westchester County
- Interactive map of White Plains
- Coordinates: 41°01′57″N 73°46′00″W
- Country: United States
- State: New York
- County: Westchester
- Settled: 1683; 343 years ago
- Incorporated (village): 1866; 160 years ago
- Incorporated (city): 1916; 110 years ago

Government
  - Type: Mayor-council
  - Body: White Plains Common Council
  - Mayor: Justin C. Brasch (D)

Area
  - Total: 9.86 sq mi (25.54 km^{2})
  - Land: 9.74 sq mi (25.22 km^{2})
  - Water: 0.12 sq mi (0.32 km^{2})
- Elevation: 213 ft (65 m)

Population (2020)
  - Total: 59,559
  - Density: 6,117.0/sq mi (2,361.77/km^{2})
  - Daytime population: 250,000
- Time zone: UTC−5 (Eastern)
  - Summer (DST): UTC−4 (Eastern)
- ZIP Codes: 10601-10607 & 10610
- Area code: 914
- FIPS code: 36-81677
- GNIS feature ID: 0977432
- Website: cityofwhiteplains.com

White Plains is a city in and the county seat of Westchester County, New York, United States. It is an inner suburb of New York City, and a commercial hub of Westchester County, a densely populated suburban county that is home to about one million people. White Plains is located in south-central Westchester County. Its downtown (Mamaroneck Avenue) is 25 miles (40 km) north of Midtown Manhattan.

The city's total population was 59,599 in the 2020 census, up from 53,077 at the 2010 census. According to the city government, the daytime weekday population is estimated at 250,000.

== History ==
=== Early history ===
At the time of the Dutch settlement of Manhattan in the early 17th century, the region had been used as farmland by the Weckquaeskeck tribe, a Wappinger people, and was called "Quarropas". To early traders it was known as "the White Plains", either from the white balsam (Gnaphalium polycephalum) which was said to have covered it, or from the heavy mist that local tradition suggests hovered over the swamplands near the Bronx River. The first non-native settlement came in November 1683, when a party of Connecticut Puritans moved westward from an earlier settlement in Rye and bought about 4,400 acres (18 km^{2}), presumably from the Weckquaeskeck. However, John Richbell of Mamaroneck claimed to have earlier title to much of the territory through his purchase of a far larger plot extending 20 miles (32 km) inland, perhaps from a different tribe. The matter was not settled until 1721, when a Royal Patent for White Plains was granted by King George II.

In 1758, White Plains became the seat of Westchester County when the colonial government for the county left West Chester, which was located in what is now the northern part of the borough of the Bronx, in New York City. The unincorporated village remained part of the Town of Rye until 1788 when the town of White Plains was created.

On July 9, 1776, a copy of the Declaration of Independence was delivered to the New York Provincial Congress, which was meeting in the county courthouse. The delegates quickly adopted a resolution approving the Declaration, thus declaring both the colony's independence and the formation of the State of New York. The Declaration itself was first publicly read from the steps of the courthouse on July 11.

During September and October 1776, troops led by George Washington took up positions in the hills of the village, hotly pursued by the British under General Sir William Howe, who attacked on October 28. The Battle of White Plains took place primarily on Chatterton Hill, (later known as "Battle Hill," and located just west of what was then a swamp but is now the downtown area) and the Bronx River. Howe's force of 4,000–6,000 British and Hessian soldiers required three attacks before the Continentals, numbering about 1,600 under the command of Generals Alexander McDougall and Israel Putnam, retreated, joining Washington's main force, which did not take part in the battle. Howe's forces had suffered 250 casualties, a severe loss, and he made no attempt to pursue the Continentals, whose casualties were about 125 dead and wounded. Three days after the battle, Washington withdrew north of the village, which was then occupied by Howe's forces. But after several inconclusive skirmishes over the next week, Howe withdrew on November 5, leaving White Plains to the Continentals. Ironically, one of Washington's subordinates, Major John Austin, who was probably drunk after having celebrated the enemy's withdrawal, reentered the village with his detachment and proceeded to burn it down. Although he was court-martialed and convicted for this action, he escaped punishment.

The first United States Census, conducted in 1790, listed the White Plains population at 505, of whom 46 were slaves. New York City's population at that time was about 33,000. By 1800, the population stood at 575 and in 1830, 830. By 1870, 26 years after the arrival of the New York Central Railroad, it had swollen to 2,630 and by 1890 to 4,508. In the decades that followed the count grew to 7,899 (1900) and 26,425 (1910). White Plains was incorporated as a village in 1866 and as a city in 1916.

=== Modern history ===
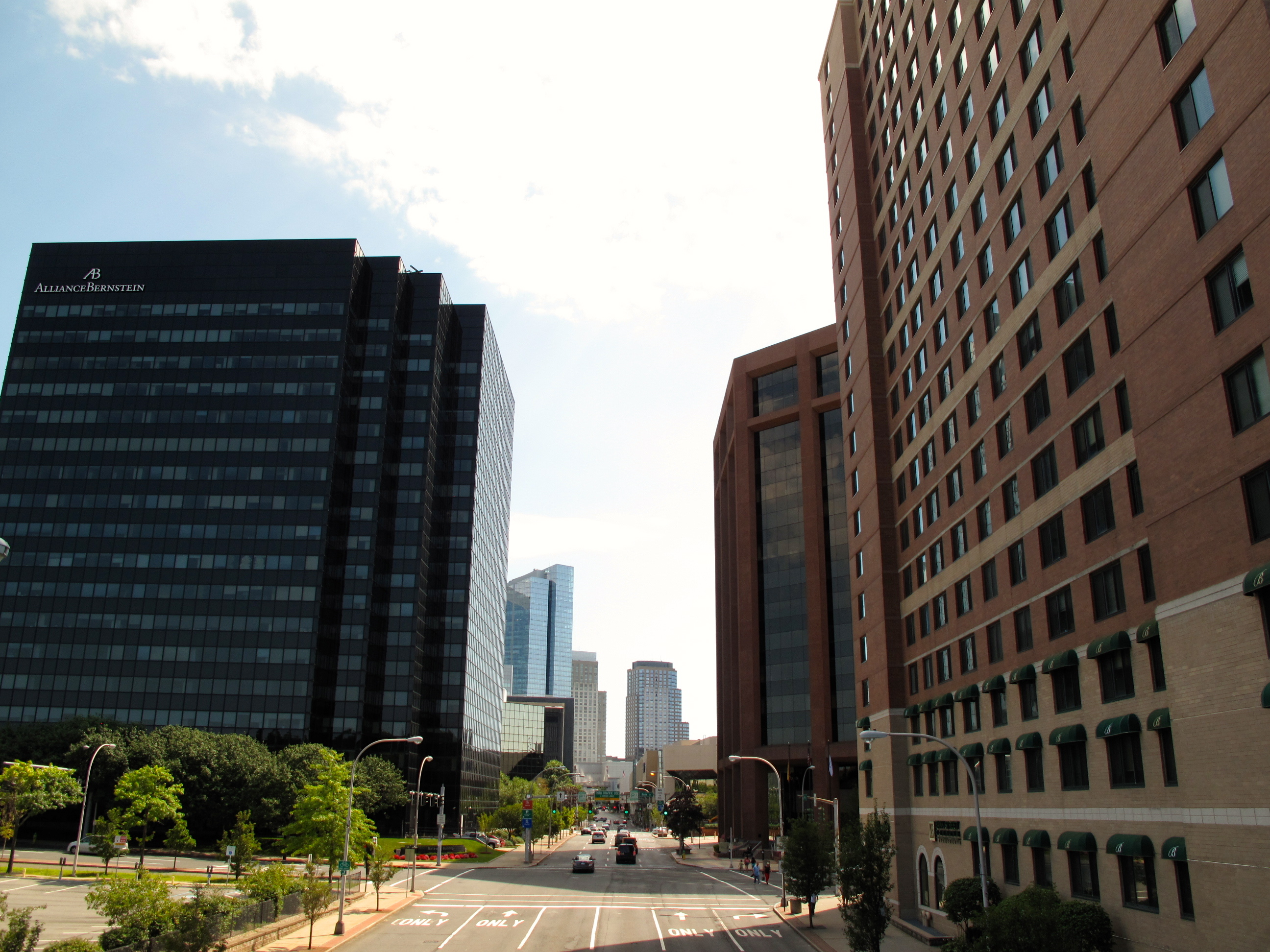
Main Street in White Plains

After World War II, White Plains' downtown area developed into a shopping district featuring branches of many famous New York-based department and specialty stores. Some of these retail locations were the first large-scale suburban stores built in the United States. In 1949, Macy's launched a grand White Plains store on Main Street across from City Hall. Other prestigious stores followed, such as B. Altman and Company, Rogers Peet, Saks Fifth Avenue, Lord & Taylor, Alexander's, Wallachs, and a short-lived branch of Bergdorf Goodman, which was converted to sister chain Neiman Marcus in 1981. Construction of nearby parkways and expressways in the 1940s through the 1970s brought shoppers from elsewhere.

During the late 1960s, the city of White Plains developed an extensive urban renewal plan for residential, commercial and mixed-use redevelopment that called for the demolition of its entire central business district from the Bronx River Parkway east to Mamaroneck Avenue. By 1978, the urban renewal program centered around the construction of the Westchester County Courthouse (1974), the Westchester One office building (1975), the Galleria at White Plains mall (1978), and a number of other office towers, retail centers and smaller commercial buildings. At the time of its construction, the Westchester One building was the largest office building between New York City and Albany, and east to Hartford.

Beginning in the 1950s, many major corporations based in New York City moved operations to White Plains and other suburban locations. These included General Foods, PepsiCo, Hitachi USA, IBM, Nestlé, Snapple, and Heineken USA. In the 1980s, at least 50 Fortune 500 corporations had their headquarters in Westchester County and nearby Fairfield County, Connecticut, but with the corporate mergers and downsizing of the 1990s, many of these companies reduced their operations in White Plains or left the area completely.

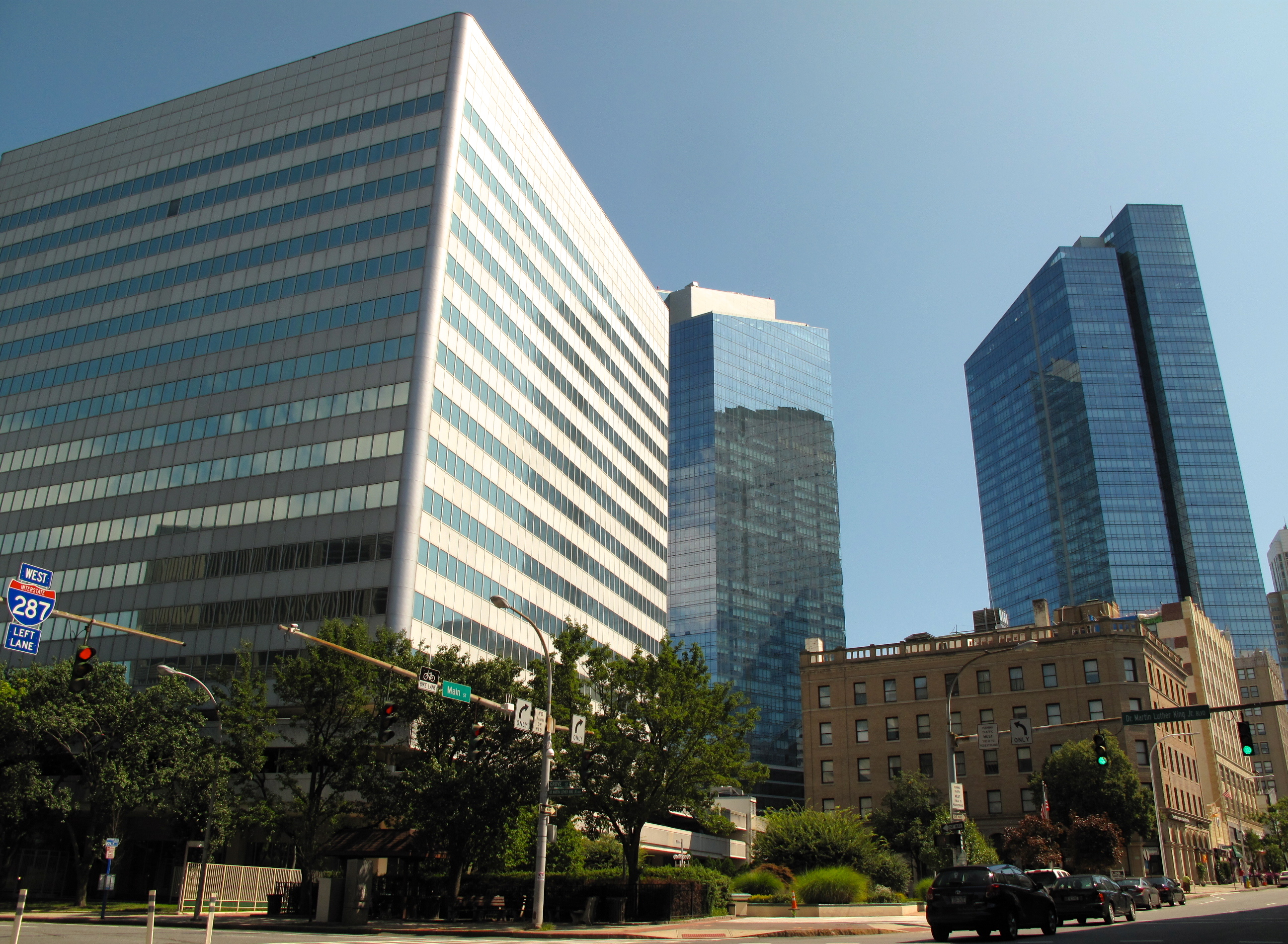
New York Power Authority and Main Street

White Plains is home to the Arts Exchange Building, which serves as the headquarters of the Westchester Arts Council. Since March 1999, visual and performing artists, emerging cultural organizations and new creative businesses have had studios and offices in the building. It is listed on the National Register of Historic Places.

The construction of the Galleria at White Plains mall in the 1970s ushered in a new era of downtown retail and office development, but by the early 1990s, economic development had stagnated, hampered by a deep recession and the overbuilding of the commercial real estate markets. For a time, White Plains had one of the highest office vacancy rates in the northeastern United States. Consolidation within the retail industry led to the closing of many of downtown's department and specialty stores. After its bankruptcy, the B. Altman store closed in 1989 and was demolished to make way for The Westchester, an upscale mall that opened in 1995 with anchors Nordstrom and Neiman Marcus. A freestanding branch of Macy's, one of downtown's original retail anchor stores, was moved two blocks away to The Galleria mall by its parent company, Federated Department Stores, replacing sister retailer Abraham & Straus when these two store divisions were merged in 1995.

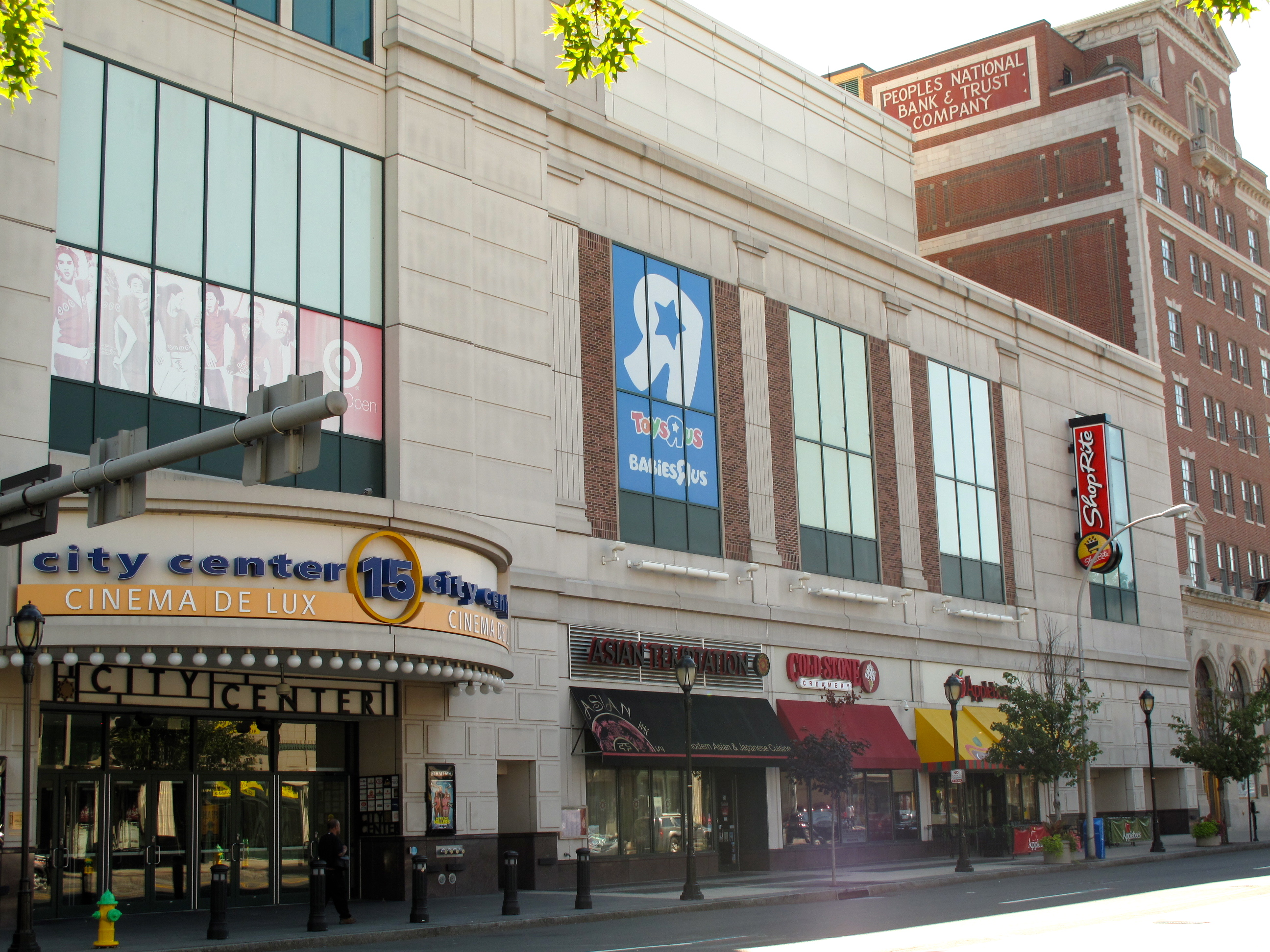
City Center on Mamaroneck Avenue

A new courthouse for the Southern District of New York was opened in 1998 and several large-scale office properties in and near downtown, including the former General Foods headquarters building, were retrofitted and leased to accommodate smaller businesses. The Macy's store on Main Street remained vacant for several years until it was also later demolished to make way for the massive City Center at White Plains complex. This large mixed-use development features two 35-story apartment and condominium towers, 600,000-square-foot (60,000 m^{2}) of retail, restaurant and entertainment space and new parking facilities.

The 21st century marked an upturn in commercial business development and in residential construction, with a 19% population increase in White Plains recorded between 2000 and 2015. The Census Bureau noted the City as the fastest growing in New York state, in May 2016.

The city is 31 minutes by express train from Midtown Manhattan, and this has attracted new residents who commute to New York City for work. In early 2003, the Saks Fifth Avenue location was closed and demolished; it was replaced in 2004 with the large retail complex called The Source at White Plains. In 2007, construction was completed on Renaissance Square, a downtown parcel that includes the luxury Ritz-Carlton hotel.

== Geography and cityscape ==
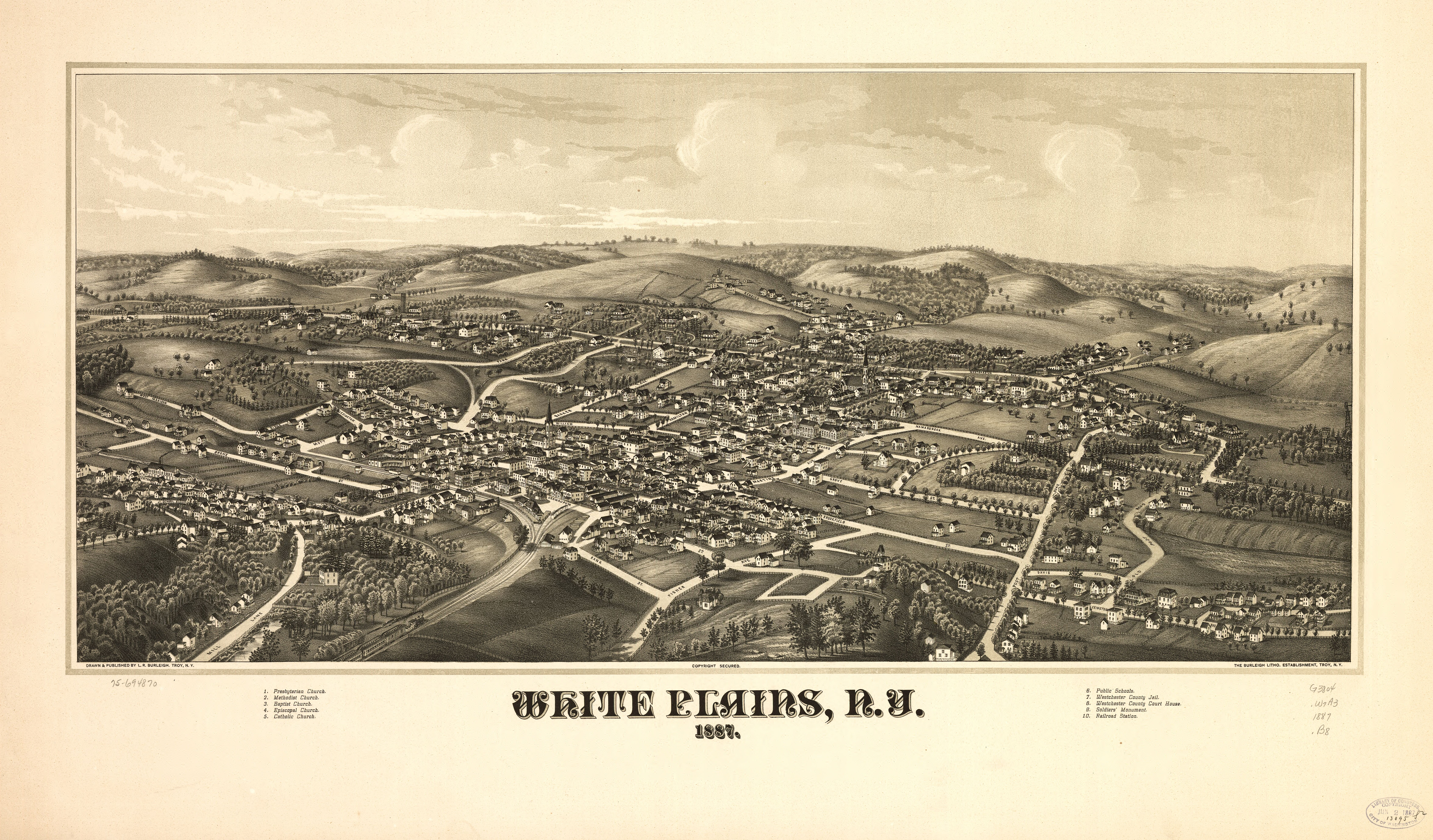
White Plains, N.Y. 1887. Includes list of important locations.

White Plains is bordered to the north by the town of North Castle, to the north and east by the town/village of Harrison, to the south by the town/village of Scarsdale, and to the west by the town of Greenburgh. The city is about 7 miles (11 km) east of the Hudson River and 7 miles (11 km) northwest of the Long Island Sound. According to the U.S. Census Bureau, White Plains has a land area of 9.77 square miles (25.3 km^{2}), and a population density of 5,820.3 inhabitants per square mile (2,247.2/km^{2}).

=== Climate ===
White Plains has a humid continental climate, with four distinct seasons. Winter is cold and wet, with occasional snow and an average January temperature of 29.8 °F (−1.2 °C), and summer is hot and humid, with a mean July temperature of 74.0 °F (23.3 °C). In spring and fall, temperatures can fluctuate from cool to hot, but are usually mild and comfortable. Precipitation is plentiful in all months of the year. The city receives about 229 clear or partly cloudy days per annum, with July typically being the sunniest month, averaging more than 70 percent of possible sunshine.

The lowest temperature ever recorded in White Plains since record-keeping began in 1948 was −10 °F (−23 °C) on January 19, 1977, and the highest ever was 102 °F (39 °C) on July 6, 2010. Over the course of a typical year, there are 18 days of at least 90 °F (32 °C) temperatures, and seven days when temperatures do not rise above the freezing point.

Climate data for White Plains (Westchester County Airport), 1991–2020 normals, extremes 1948–present
Month	Jan	Feb	Mar	Apr	May	Jun	Jul	Aug	Sep	Oct	Nov	Dec	Year
Record high °F (°C)	70 (21)	77 (25)	82 (28)	92 (33)	96 (36)	98 (37)	102 (39)	101 (38)	100 (38)	90 (32)	78 (26)	75 (24)	102 (39)
Mean daily maximum °F (°C)	37.3 (2.9)	40.1 (4.5)	47.6 (8.7)	59.2 (15.1)	69.2 (20.7)	78.0 (25.6)	83.2 (28.4)	81.2 (27.3)	74.2 (23.4)	63.0 (17.2)	52.2 (11.2)	42.3 (5.7)	60.6 (15.9)
Daily mean °F (°C)	29.8 (−1.2)	31.9 (−0.1)	39.1 (3.9)	49.6 (9.8)	59.5 (15.3)	68.6 (20.3)	74.0 (23.3)	72.4 (22.4)	65.4 (18.6)	54.2 (12.3)	44.2 (6.8)	35.1 (1.7)	52.0 (11.1)
Mean daily minimum °F (°C)	22.4 (−5.3)	23.7 (−4.6)	30.5 (−0.8)	40.1 (4.5)	49.8 (9.9)	59.1 (15.1)	64.9 (18.3)	63.6 (17.6)	56.7 (13.7)	45.5 (7.5)	36.2 (2.3)	28.0 (−2.2)	43.4 (6.3)
Record low °F (°C)	−10 (−23)	−10 (−23)	−6 (−21)	16 (−9)	32 (0)	39 (4)	46 (8)	41 (5)	32 (0)	24 (−4)	11 (−12)	−5 (−21)	−10 (−23)
Average precipitation inches (mm)	3.20 (81)	2.53 (64)	4.11 (104)	4.20 (107)	3.94 (100)	4.25 (108)	4.07 (103)	4.36 (111)	4.94 (125)	4.33 (110)	3.64 (92)	4.18 (106)	47.75 (1,213)
Average snowfall inches (cm)	7.7 (20)	8.3 (21)	4.9 (12)	1.2 (3.0)	0.0 (0.0)	0.0 (0.0)	0.0 (0.0)	0.0 (0.0)	0.0 (0.0)	0.0 (0.0)	0.4 (1.0)	5.2 (13)	27.7 (70)
Average precipitation days (≥ 0.01 in)	9.5	8.9	10.5	11.1	12.2	10.8	9.8	10.5	9.8	10.4	9.8	11.1	124.4
Average snowy days (≥ 0.1 in)	3.6	2.4	1.8	0.3	0.0	0.0	0.0	0.0	0.0	0.0	0.3	2.3	10.7
Source: NOAA (snow 1981–2010)

=== Tallest buildings ===
Rank	Building	Height	Floors	Built
1	The Residences at the Ritz Carlton, Westchester – North Tower	484 ft (148 m)	44	2008
2	The Residences at the Ritz-Carlton, Westchester – South Tower	484 ft (148 m)	44	2008
3 (tie)	One City Place	354 ft (108 m)	35	2004
3 (tie)	The Tower at City Place	354 ft (108 m)	35	2005
5	Westchester County Courthouse	271 ft (83 m)	19	1974
6	Gateway Building	250 ft (76 m)	18	1985
7	25 Bank Street	227 ft (69 m)	22	2003
8	15 Bank Street	217 ft (66 m)	21	2003
9	Clarence D. Rappleyea Building	210 ft (64 m)	17	1981
10	Westchester One	202 ft (62 m)	21	1976

=== Neighborhoods ===
The City of White Plains includes various neighborhoods of differing characters and sizes, some of which contain multiple subsections:

- Battle Hill
- Carhart
- Colonial Corners
- Dekalb
- Downtown White Plains
- East White Plains
- Eastview
- Ferris Avenue
- Fisher Hill
- Fulton Street
- Gedney (Gedney Circle, Gedney Farm Gardens, Gedney Farms, Gedney Manor, Gedney Meadows, Gedney Park)
- Green Acres
- Haviland Manor
- Highland Park
- Highlands (Lower Highlands, Upper Highlands)
- Hillair
- Holbrooke
- Idle Forest
- North Broadway
- North Street (Club Pointe, Country Club Ridge, The Fairways, The Greens)
- North White Plains
- Old Mamaroneck Road
- Old Oak Ridge
- Prospect Park
- Reynal Park
- Rocky Dell
- Rosedale (Brook Hills, Cobblefield, Rosedale Estates, Rosedale Gardens, Rosedale Manor, Rosedale Park, Rosedale Woods)
- Saxon Woods
- Soundview
- Westminster Ridge
- Woodcrest Heights

=== Parks and recreation ===
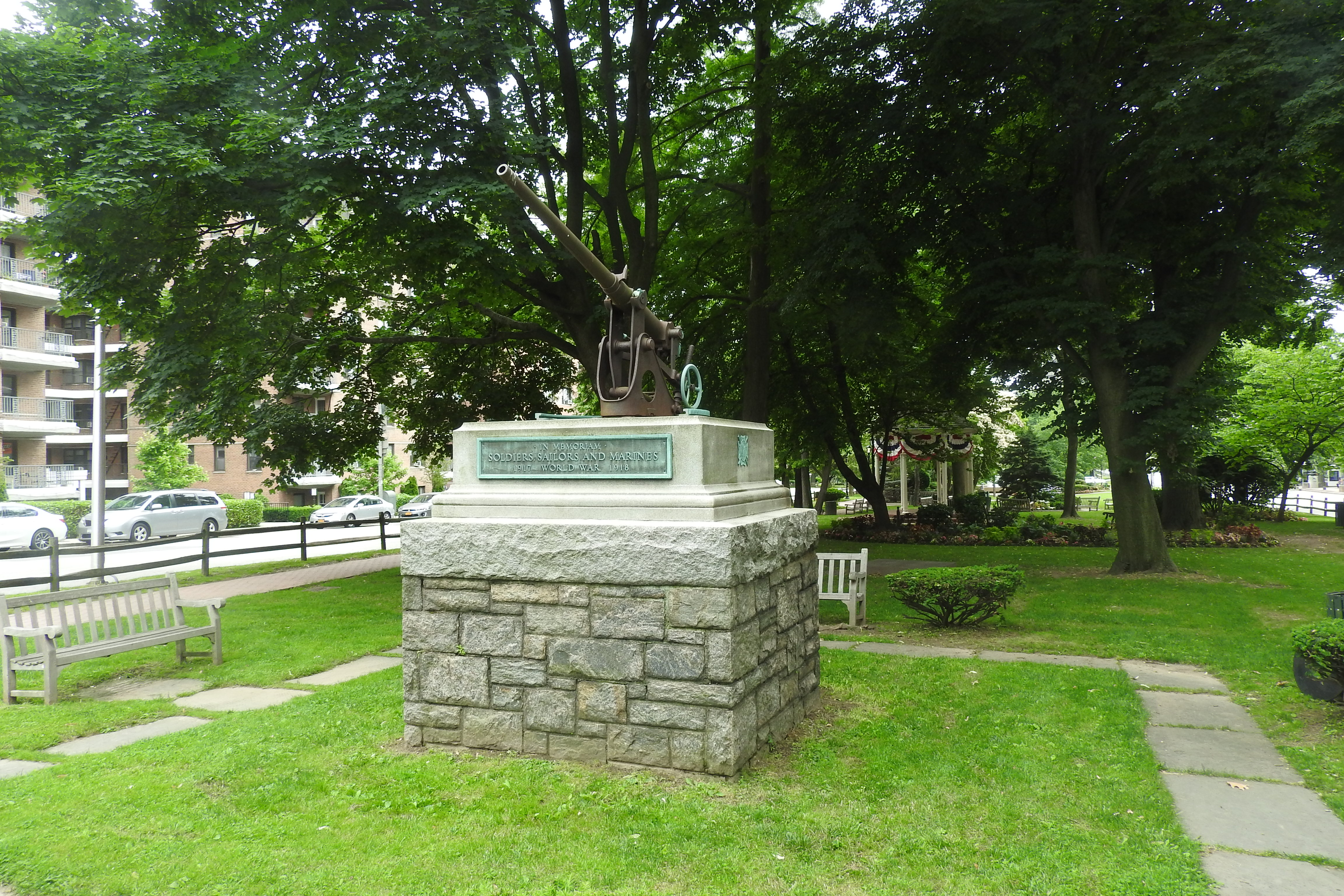
Tibbetts Park, downtown

- Ebersole Ice Rink
- Maple Moor Golf Course
- Saxon Woods Park provides a range of recreational amenities, including trails, a standard and miniature golf course, and the largest swimming pool in Westchester.
- Silver Lake Preserve
- Westchester Golf Range

==== Private clubs ====
- Knollwood Country Club
- Metropolis Country Club
- Westchester Hills Golf Club

== Economy ==
During the 1950s to the 1990s, numerous New York City companies relocated to White Plains and other suburban New York City communities, so that its economy is tied to large corporations that have moved to the city, such as New York-Presbyterian Hospital, ITT, and the U.S. headquarters of Heineken International. ITT relocated to Connecticut in 2022, with its spin-off company, Xylem remaining headquartered in White Plains.

Other companies based in White Plains include the New York Power Authority, PURE Insurance, Dannon, Krasdale Foods, C-Town supermarkets, AboveNet Gerber Life Insurance Company Atlas Air, Combe, along with the international headquarters of Nine West, Allegiance Financial, Nokia, and AllianceBernstein.

== Government ==
=== Municipal government ===
White Plains is governed using a mayor-council system. The city's legislative body is called the Common Council, and consists of the mayor and six council members. As of 2026, the city's current mayor is Democrat Justin Brasch.

=== State and federal representation ===
==== New York State Legislature ====
White Plains is represented in the New York State Legislature by two senators and two assembly members.

New York State Senate
District	Name	Assumed office	Party affiliation
35	Andrea Stewart-Cousins	2019	Democratic
37	Shelley Mayer	2018	Democratic

New York State Assembly
District	Name	Assumed office	Party affiliation
88	Amy Paulin	2001	Democratic
93	Chris Burdick	2021	Democratic

==== United States Congress ====
White Plains lies within New York's 16th congressional district and has been represented by Democrat George Latimer in the United States House of Representatives since 2025. It is represented by Democrats Chuck Schumer and Kirsten Gillibrand in the United States Senate.

== Education ==
=== Public schools ===
The White Plains Public School System, with a 2006 enrollment of more than 6,000 students, maintains five elementary schools (grades K–5), two middle schools (Eastview for grade 6, Highlands for grades 7–8) and one high school (9–12), as well as auxiliary facilities, including a pre-kindergarten program, a community school (grades 7–12), adult and continuing education, and a program for school-age patients at New York-Presbyterian Hospital, whose campus is located in the city.

Since 1988 the district has operated under a Controlled Parents' Choice Program, whereby the parents of elementary school children can select the school which their child attends based on factors other than proximity to the school.

The five elementary schools, in addition to teaching core competencies, have different educational focuses including science and technology, communication arts and global understanding. Two of the elementary schools offer bilingual education where children are taught in both English and Spanish. Both English speaking and Spanish speaking families can choose to be entered into a lottery for a place in the bilingual classes.

White Plains High School, built in the late 1950s (when it moved from The Highlands School) on a 72-acre (29 ha) campus (formerly James Cash Penney's 72-acre Westchester Estate, until he moved to Westport, Connecticut in the 1940s), serves public school students in grades 9–12. The school has a swimming pool that overlooks a small valley that holds the track and football field. The White Plains Recreation Department works with the schools to offer programs.

The district is governed by a seven-member Board of Education, elected at-large for staggered three-year terms. A school superintendent reports to the Board.

=== Parochial or private schools ===
- Archbishop Stepinac High School on Mamaroneck Avenue in the Gedney area
- Good Counsel Academy, an all-girls Catholic high school for more than a century operated by the Sisters of the Divine Compassion on North Broadway, and Good Counsel Elementary (Pre-K through Grade 8, coeducational) located on the same campus close to the Elisabeth Haub School of Law at Pace University, have both closed, due to declining enrollments, and the aging and increased medical costs for the nuns of the order.,
- Our Lady of Sorrows Elementary School in the Gedney area
- German School New York on Partridge Road
- Solomon Schechter School of Westchester Lower School (Grades K-5)
- Windward School (for children with language-based learning disabilities)

=== Colleges and universities ===
- Fordham University Westchester Campus is home to Fordham's Graduate Schools of Business Administration, Education, Social Service, and Religion and Religious Education.
- Pace University The Elisabeth Haub School of Law at Pace is located on North Broadway in White Plains. This campus originally belonged to Good Counsel College, later named the College of White Plains (1972–1976). The College of White Plains merged with Pace University in 1976. Pace formerly had a Graduate School campus in an office building on Martine Avenue in downtown White Plains. That location has closed.
- The College of Westchester, formerly known as the Westchester Business Institute
- Berkeley College (closed 2021)
- Mercy College

== Demographics ==
Historical population
Census	Pop.	Note	%±
1880	2,381		—
1890	4,042		69.8%
1900	7,899		95.4%
1910	15,045		90.5%
1920	21,031		39.8%
1930	35,830		70.4%
1940	40,327		12.6%
1950	43,366		7.5%
1960	50,485		16.4%
1970	50,346		−0.3%
1980	46,999		−6.6%
1990	48,718		3.7%
2000	53,077		8.9%
2010	56,853		7.1%
2020	59,559		4.8%
U.S. Decennial Census

=== 2020 census ===
As of the 2020 census, White Plains had a population of 59,559. The median age was 40.9 years. 19.0% of residents were under the age of 18 and 19.0% of residents were 65 years of age or older. For every 100 females there were 90.7 males, and for every 100 females age 18 and over there were 88.3 males age 18 and over.

100.0% of residents lived in urban areas, while 0.0% lived in rural areas.

There were 24,162 households in White Plains, of which 26.3% had children under the age of 18 living in them. Of all households, 42.7% were married-couple households, 19.0% were households with a male householder and no spouse or partner present, and 32.1% were households with a female householder and no spouse or partner present. About 34.2% of all households were made up of individuals and 13.8% had someone living alone who was 65 years of age or older.

There were 25,494 housing units, of which 5.2% were vacant. The homeowner vacancy rate was 1.4% and the rental vacancy rate was 4.6%.

Racial composition as of the 2020 census
Race	Number	Percent
White	28,583	48.0%
Black or African American	7,146	12.0%
American Indian and Alaska Native	729	1.2%
Asian	4,804	8.1%
Native Hawaiian and Other Pacific Islander	36	0.1%
Some other race	10,967	18.4%
Two or more races	7,294	12.2%
Hispanic or Latino (of any race)	19,426	32.6%

=== 2010 census ===
As of the 2010 United States census, there were 56,853 people residing in the city. The racial makeup of the city was 48.9% white, 13.2% Black, 0.1% Native American, 6.3% Asian, <0.1% Pacific Islander, 0.3% from some other race and 1.5% from two or more races. 29.6% were Hispanic or Latino of any race.

=== 2000 census ===
As of the census of 2000, there were 53,077 people, 20,921 households, and 12,704 families residing in the city. The population density was 5,415.5 inhabitants per square mile (2,090.9/km^{2}). There were 21,576 housing units at an average density of 2,201.4 per square mile (850.0/km^{2}). The racial makeup of the city was 64.93% white, 15.91% African American, 4.5% Asian, 0.34% Native American, 0.07% Pacific Islander, 10.37% from other races, and 3.88% from two or more races. Hispanic or Latino of any race were 23.51% of the population. In 2010, Businessweek Magazine named White Plains one of the fastest-growing cities in the United States.

There were 20,921 households, out of which 26.9% had children under the age of 18 living with them, 45.7% were married couples living together, 11.3% had a female householder with no husband present, and 39.3% were non-families. 33.4% of all households were made up of individuals, and 11.8% had someone living alone who was 65 years of age or older. The average household size was 2.47 and the average family size was 3.14.

In the city, the population was spread out, with 21.2% under the age of 18, 7.5% from 18 to 24, 32.5% from 25 to 44, 23.6% from 45 to 64, and 15.2% who were 65 years of age or older. The median age was 38 years. For every 100 females, there were 89.8 males. For every 100 females age 18 and over, there were 85.7 males.

The median income for a household in the city was $58,545, and the median income for a family was $71,891 (these figures had risen to $73,744 and $92,215 respectively as of a 2007 estimate). Males had a median income of $47,742 versus $36,917 for females. The per capita income for the city was $33,825. About 9.2% of families and 12.4% of the population were below the poverty line, including 12.2% of those under age 18 and 7.2% of those age 65 or over.

=== 10605 ===
The 10605 zip code, spanning the southern portion of the city, encompasses much of White Plains' residential neighborhoods and is primarily composed of single-family housing. As of the 2020 United States census, there were 19,438 people residing in 10605. The median income for a household in the zip code was $140,262. As of 2024, the average home value in 10605 was $914,020.

== Culture ==
=== Film ===
Several popular films and TV series have been filmed in White Plains, including The Departed, Across The Universe, Eighth Grade, Alex Strangelove, The Beaver, The Americans, and Sisters. The animated television series Big Mouth also plays a basketball game against the White Plains Tigers. White Plains was also selected as the original filming destination for Larry Charles' Borat, but Sacha Baron Cohen insisted the film be shot in New York City.

=== Performing arts ===
The White Plains Performing Arts Center, which can seat up to 410 people, serves as a venue for a variety of events, such as Broadway theatre and concerts.

White Plains is home to the Westchester Philharmonic, the sole professional symphony orchestra in Westchester County. The Philharmonic performs at SUNY Purchase's Performing Arts Center.

=== Tourism ===
The White Plains Farmers' Market operates year-round in the city, setting up Downtown at 255 Main Street from May to November, and in the Westchester County Center the rest of the year. In addition to the various food products sold, there is often also live music at the Market.

=== Sports ===
White Plains is home to the United States Tennis Association USTA B team.

Westchester County Center is home to the Westchester Knicks of the NBA G League, which began play in the 2014–2015 season. It was also the primary home of the New York Liberty of the Women's National Basketball Association from 2018 to 2020.

The city is also home to USA Rugby League franchise the White Plains Wombats. and North American Rugby League franchise New York Freedom.

=== Nightlife ===
White Plains has a vibrant nightlife, centered around Mamaroneck Avenue and surrounding areas.

== Infrastructure ==
=== Transportation ===
==== Highways ====
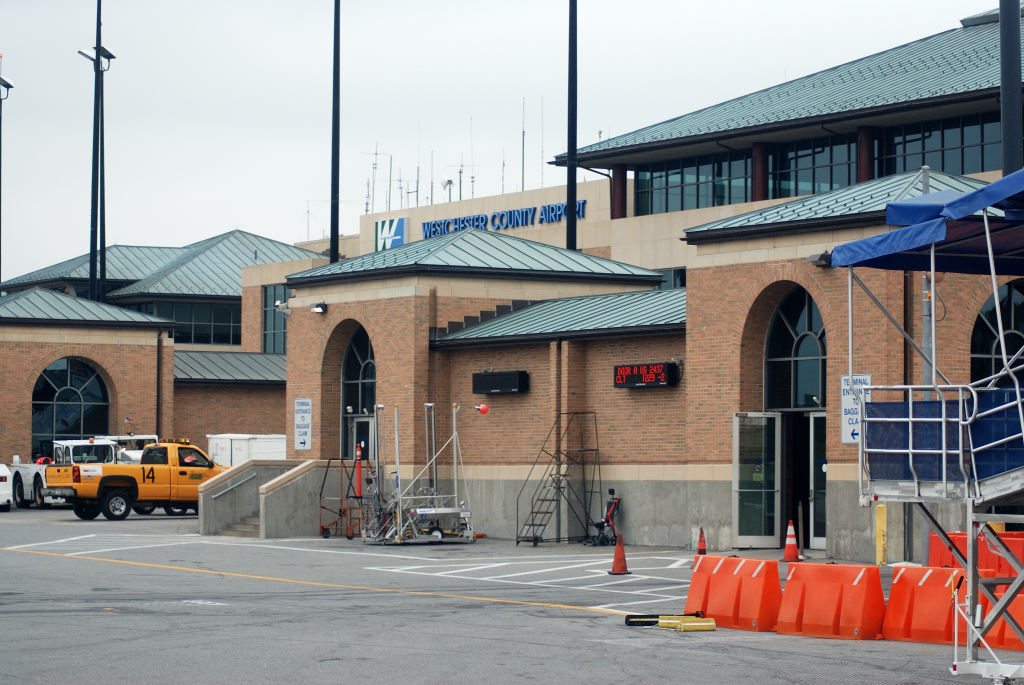
Westchester County Airport

The Cross-Westchester Expressway, or I-287, runs through White Plains, connecting Tarrytown to Rye. On its eastern end, I-287 meets I-95, the major commercial route along the East Coast. At its western end, I-287 meets I-87 and the New York State Thruway on its approach to the Tappan Zee Bridge, which crosses the Hudson River into Rockland County. The bridge allows connections to Rockland, points upstate, and parts of northern New Jersey. Current highway works include pedestrian walkways over the highway, an extra lane on either side, and on/off ramps to help motor traffic and pedestrians. Vegetation removals have upset some in the community but it is reported that the area will be fixed and trees will be replanted when work on the highway comes to an end. The Bronx River Parkway, which runs north–south through White Plains, provides access south to New York City or north to the Kensico Circle in North Castle.

==== Air ====
Westchester County Airport is located in Harrison, about 7 miles (11 km) northeast of downtown White Plains. Often the airlines and traveling public refer to Westchester County Airport as "White Plains." It serves as a minor hub for JetBlue Airways, which offer regularly scheduled flights to several destinations in Florida. In addition, JetBlue began service from Westchester to Nassau, Bahamas in November 2011. White Plains is also located within an hour's drive of two major New York City airports.

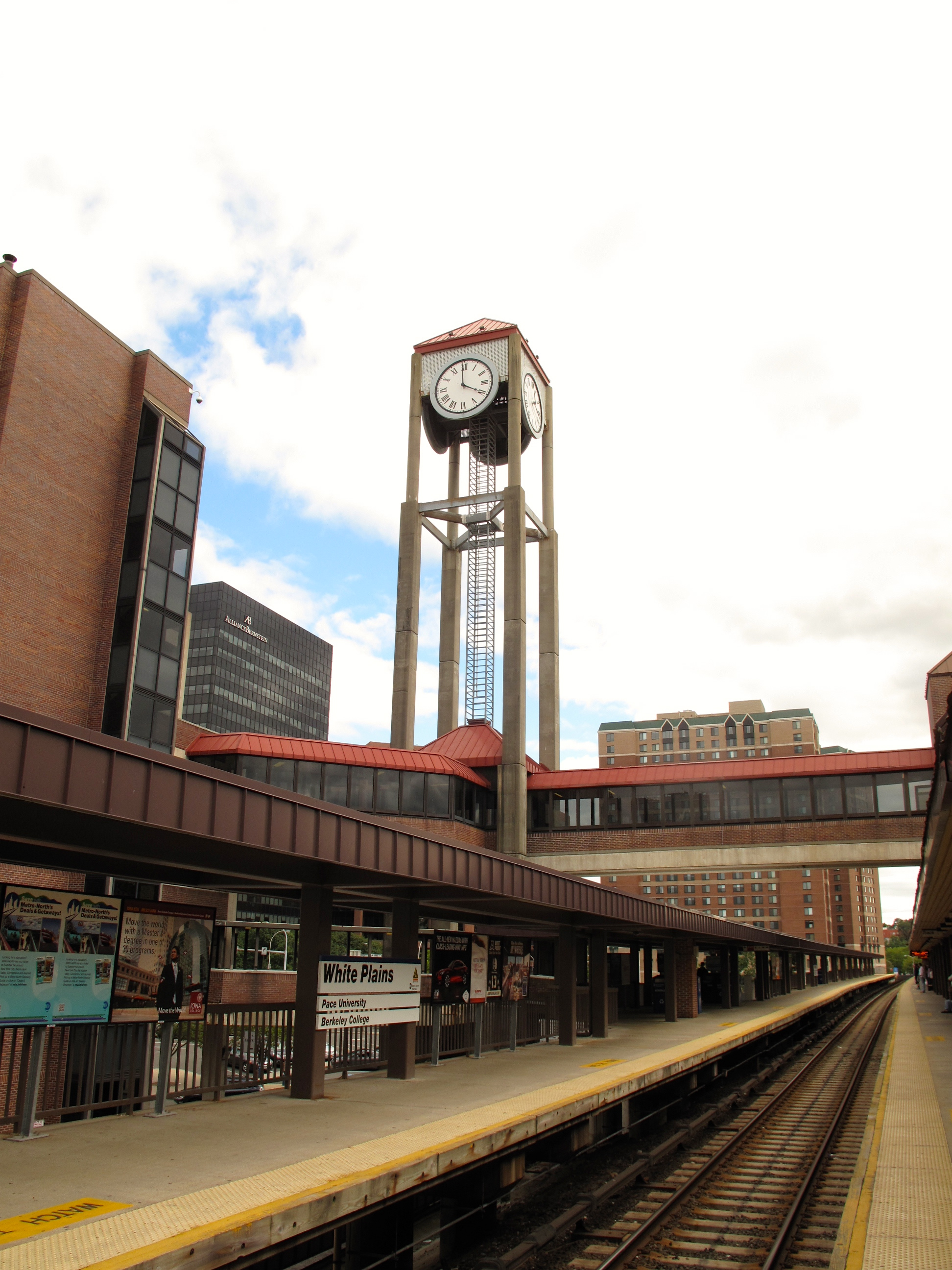
White Plains Metro-North train station

==== Rail ====
Two Metro-North Railroad stations – the White Plains station, located downtown at Main Street and the Bronx River, and the North White Plains station, provide daily train service to Grand Central Terminal in Midtown Manhattan. Both stations are on the Harlem Line.

==== Bus ====
Bee Line is Westchester County's public bus system and several routes pass through White Plains offering local service to many surrounding communities. A few routes serve the Bronx and connect with the New York City subway. The main Bee Line hub in White Plains is the Trans-Center, adjacent to the Metro-North station. Other regional bus services that serve White Plains include the Hudson Link to Rockland County; Leprechaun Lines to Poughkeepsie; CT Transit's I-Bus to Stamford, Connecticut; as well as Greyhound, Trailways and Coach USA service to upstate New York and Long Island.

=== Fire department ===
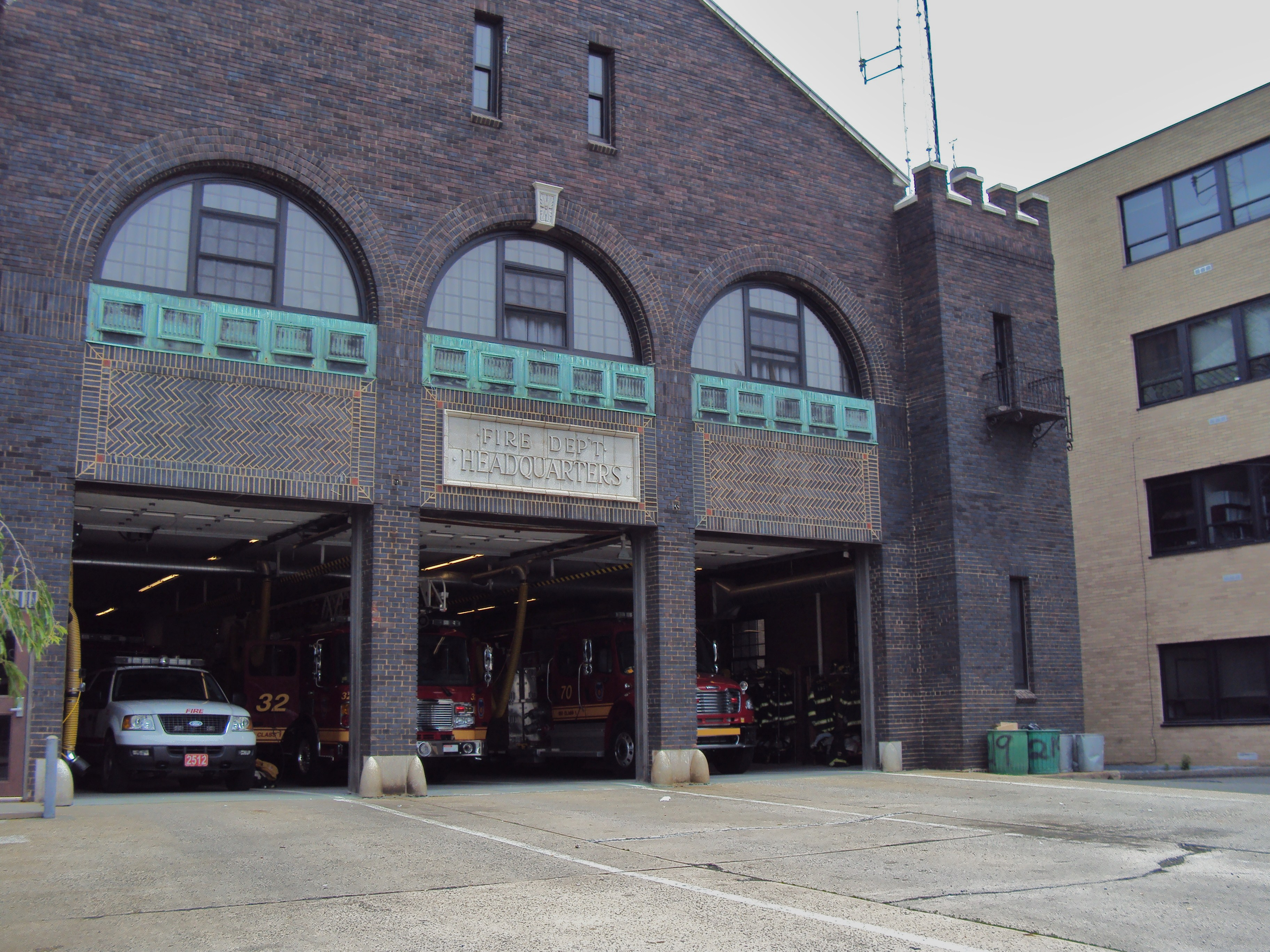
White Plains Fire Department headquarters

The city of White Plains is protected by professional firefighters of the City of White Plains Fire Bureau, part of the Department of Public Safety, but commonly referred to as the "fire department" (WPFD). The White Plains Fire Department is currently the seventh-largest fire department in the state of New York. The WPFD currently operates out of five fire stations located throughout the city, with each shift commanded by a deputy chief. The WPFD also operates a frontline fire apparatus fleet of five engines, three ladders, one rescue, and numerous other special, support, and reserve units.

== Media ==
=== Newspaper ===
The Journal News, the major daily newspaper for the Lower Hudson Valley region, is based in White Plains. The current paper, owned by the Gannett Company, was formed in 1998 by the merger of eleven local papers in Westchester and Rockland counties.

== Historic sites ==
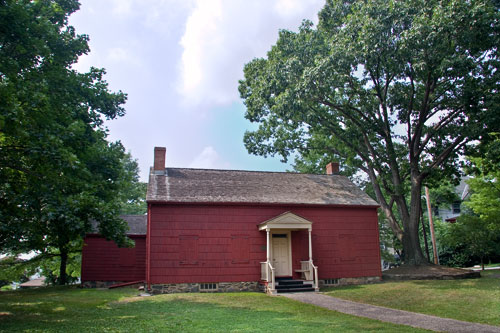
Jacob Purdy House

- Jacob Purdy House (1721), used as General George Washington's headquarters in 1778 and possibly in 1776 during the Battle of White Plains in the American Revolutionary War. In the 1960s it was repaired and restored, and in 1973 the structure was moved to its present location. A further renovation was conducted around 1980, involving both professional craftsmen and local teenagers in an apprentice program.
- Elijah Miller House (1738), is a historic home in North White Plains, town of North Castle, Westchester County, New York. The house is an 18th-century Rhode Island-style farmhouse that was occupied by General George Washington on three occasions, most notably as a headquarters command post during the Battle of White Plains. In 2010 the county legislature passed a $1.2 million bond issue to finance its restoration. County executive Robert Astorino, who had supported preserving the building five years earlier as a member of the legislature, vetoed the measure, saying it should be supported by private funds.
- White Plains Armory (1910), erected on the site of the first Westchester County Courthouse. A monument in front of the building commemorates the first public reading in New York of the Declaration of Independence, on July 11, 1776.
- White Plains Rural Cemetery, incorporated 1854, although in use as a cemetery from 1797. The cemetery office occupies the structure that was the first Methodist Church in White Plains (1795, rebuilt in 1797 after a fire on the day of its original dedication).
- Percy Grainger Home and Studio, occupied by the composer from 1921 until his death in 1961, and by his widow, Ella Ström-Brandelius, until her death in 1979. It is now maintained as a museum by the International Percy Grainger Society.
- In addition to the above, the Bar Building, Good Counsel Complex, Leo Friedlander Studio, Mapleton, Peoples National Bank and Trust Company Building, Presbyterian Rest for Convalescents, Soundview Manor, and Woman's Club of White Plains are also listed on the National Register of Historic Places.
- Lee’s Funeral Home—added to African American Heritage Trail of Westchester County in 2026; it was established in 1915 to provide funerary services to the local African-American community during the Jim Crow era, filling a critical void left by white-owned funeral homes that refused to serve them.

== Notable people ==
Listings designated with a (b) signifies that the person was born in White Plains.

- Admiral Dot, real name Leopold Kahn, little person, lived in White Plains where he founded The Admiral Dot Hotel
- Katrina Adams, former professional tennis player and former USTA president
- Richard H. Anderson, World War II ace-in-a-day
- Patrick Baxter (serial killer), serial killer
- Carolyn Bessette-Kennedy, wife of John F. Kennedy Jr., born in White Plains (b)
- Adam Bradley, mayor of White Plains from 2010 to 2011
- Hikaru Nakamura, five-time United States Chess Champion, and youngest American Grandmaster. Born in Japan and later moved to White Plains with his mother, brother and stepfather at the age of 2.
- Brian Burton (Danger Mouse), musician, songwriter and producer (b)
- Joseph Campbell, author and expert on myth and legend (b)
- Sonia Citron, WNBA player (b)
- Erin Cardillo, actress, was born in White Plains
- Lynn Conway, computer scientist responsible for the Mead and Conway revolution in Very-large-scale integration design
- Glenn Cooper, thriller writer and film producer
- John Curran, financial journalist
- Jennifer Damiano, Broadway actress, noted for her roles in Next to Normal and Spider-Man: Turn Off the Dark
- Dan Duryea, actor (b), was born in White Plains and graduated from White Plains High School in 1924
- Frank Enea, musician and composer, was born in White Plains
- Johnny Farrell, golfer, 1928 U.S. Open champion, was born in White Plains
- Noah Fleiss, actor, was born in White Plains
- Drew "Dru-Ha" Friedman, hip-hop record executive of Duck Down Music Inc., born and raised in White Plains
- Channing Frye, NBA forward (b)
- Percy Grainger, Australian-born U.S. composer, pianist and conductor
- Shelley Hack, actress and supermodel (b)
- David Harbour, actor (b)
- Ellen Holly, actress
- Eric Holtz, Head Coach of the Israel National Baseball Team
- Bob Hyland, NFL lineman and candidate for mayor
- Deacon Jones, MLB infielder, born in White Plains
- Nancy Kissinger, wife of Henry Kissinger
- Jonathan Larson, writer of musical Rent (b)
- Harry Lauter, character actor
- Alison Lurie, Pulitzer Prize–winning novelist, grew up in White Plains
- Joseph Magaletti, convicted murderer and suspected serial killer, was born in White Plains
- Matisyahu, American Jewish reggae artist
- Jesse McCartney, singer-songwriter and actor, lived in White Plains
- Mike McGlone, actor
- John Mara, co-owner and president of the New York Giants
- Emily McLaughlin, soap opera actress
- Boyd Melson, boxer
- Art Monk, NFL Hall of Famer (wide receiver) played football for White Plains High School
- Chris Murphy, U.S. senator for Connecticut (b)
- Tommy O'Sullivan, rower at Row America Rye, philanthropist, poet
- Garrick Ohlsson, classical pianist
- Nicholas Orzio, photographer(b)
- Candace Owens, political commentator born in White Plains(b)
- Joseph Polchinski, theoretical physicist and string theorist (b)
- Justin Raimondo, author and editorial director of Antiwar.com (b)
- Scott Reiniger, actor, and, as "Prince of Ghor", a hereditary prince (b)
- Louise Reiss (1920–2011), physician who coordinated what became known as the Baby Tooth Survey, which found Strontium-90 in the deciduous teeth of children living in the St. Louis area
- JD Roberto, game show host and writer best known for hosting Shop 'Til You Drop from 2003 to 2005, replacing former host Pat Finn. (b)
- Jimmy Roberts, journalist and broadcaster
- Alfred Sherwood Romer (1894–1973), paleontologist and biologist (b)
- Vanessa Rousso, professional poker player (b)
- Bhaskar Sunkara, political writer
- Andrew S. Tanenbaum, computer scientist and professor
- Micah Townshend, Secretary of State of Vermont
- Ralph Waite, actor who played John Walton in The Waltons television series (b)
- Chris Watson, American-Israeli basketball player
- Claire Weinstein, Olympic silver medalist freestyle swimmer
- James Whitmore, actor known for such films as The Asphalt Jungle and The Shawshank Redemption (b)
- Rhys Williams, soccer player (b)
- Mark Zuckerberg, founder and CEO of Facebook (b)
