= List of closed schools in the Archdiocese of New York =

The following American schools were once operated by Catholic churches in the Archdiocese of New York and have closed.

The number of schools operated by the archdiocese in the early 1960s was 414; that figure went down to 274 in early 2011, and then 245 in 2013. The student count went from 212,781 in 1961 to 79,782 in 2011, and then below 75,000 in 2013. The archdiocese closed 13 schools in New York City and 14 outside of New York City in 2011.

== Schools that have closed in the Archdiocese ==
=== Seminaries ===
- Cathedral College (Upper West Side, Manhattan) – served as the archdiocese's minor seminary from 1903 to 1968; it closed in 1968 and merged with Cathedral College of the Immaculate Conception in Douglaston, New York.
- St. John Neumann Seminary (Riverdale (1980–2001), Yonkers (Dunwoodie) (2001–2012)) – served as the archdiocese's minor seminary residence from 1980 to 2012; located in the Riverdale section of the Bronx from 1980 to 2001 before moving to the campus of St. Joseph's Seminary in the Dunwoodie section of Yonkers, New York; closed in 2012 as part of the new inter-diocesan program that saw the minor seminaries of the Archdiocese of New York, the Diocese of Brooklyn and the Diocese of Rockville Centre merge at Cathedral College in Douglaston; students from the seminary studied at either St. John's University in Jamaica, Queens, or Fordham University in the Bronx for their undergraduate philosophy degrees.

=== Catholic colleges and universities ===
==== Colleges and universities in New York City ====
- College of Holy Names (Manhattan) – Run by the Sisters of the Holy Names of Jesus and Mary; closed in 1969.
- Manhattanville College of the Sacred Heart (Manhattan) – Run by the Society of the Sacred Heart; opened in 1917 and moved to Purchase in 1952.
- Marymount Manhattan College (Manhattan) – Run by the Religious of the Sacred Heart of Mary; opened in 1936; declared non-Catholic by Cardinal Edward Egan in 2005.
- Mercy Hospital School of Nursing (Manhattan) – Run by the Sisters of Mercy; operated from 1904 to 1967.
- Misericordia Hospital School of Nursing (the Bronx) – Run by the Misericordia Sisters; operated from 1911 to 1982; located in Manhattan from 1911 to 1958.
- Notre Dame College (Staten Island) – Run by the Sisters of Notre Dame; operated from 1931 to 1971.
- St. Clare Hospital School of Nursing (Manhattan) – Run by the Franciscan Sisters of Alleghany; operated from 1951 to 1976.
- St. Francis Xavier College (Manhattan) – Run by the Society of Jesus; operated from 1847 to 1912.
- St. Pius X School of Liturgical Music (Manhattan) – Run by the Society of the Sacred Heart; opened in 1916; moved to Purchase in 1952.
- St. Vincent Hospital School of Nursing (Manhattan) – Run by the Sisters of Charity; operated from 1905 to 1999.
- St. Vincent Hospital School of Nursing (Staten Island) – Run by the Sisters of Charity; operated from 1912 to 1998.

==== Colleges and universities outside of New York City ====
- Elizabeth Seton College (Yonkers) – Run by the Sisters of Charity of New York; opened in 1961 when the Sisters of Charity upgraded it from a high school and merged with Iona College in 1989; closed in 1993 when Iona relinquished property due to financial difficulties; now owned by Tara Circle.
- Epiphany Apostolic College (Newburgh) – Run by the Josephites of Baltimore; merged with Our Lady of Hope Seminary in 1970.
- Good Counsel College (White Plains) – Run by the Sisters of the Divine Compassion; opened in 1923 and merged with Pace University in 1975.
- Ladycliff College (Highland Falls) – Run by the Missionary Sisters of the Third Order of St. Francis; operated from 1933 to 1980.
- Manhattanville College of the Sacred Heart (Purchase) – Run by the Society of the Sacred Heart; moved from Manhattan in 1952 and became non-denominational in 1971.
- Marian College (Poughkeepsie, New York) – Run by the Marist Brothers; opened in 1946; renamed Marist College in 1960 and Marist University in 2025.
- Maryknoll School of Theology (Maryknoll) – Run by the Maryknoll Sisters of St. Dominic; operated from 1933 to 1995.
- Marymount College (Tarrytown) – Run by the Religious of the Sacred Heart of Mary; operated from 1907 to 2002; merged with Fordham University in 2002; closed in 2007.
- Presentation Junior College of the Sacred Heart (New Windsor) – Run by the Sisters of the Presentation of the Blessed Virgin Mary; closed in 1970.
- Queen of Apostles College (Harriman) – Run by the Sisters of the Catholic Apostolate; closed in 1981.
- Rodgers College (Maryknoll) – Run by the Maryknoll Sisters of St. Dominic; closed in 1973; formerly known as Maryknoll Teachers' College and Mary Rodgers College.
- St. Ann Scholasticate (Poughkeepsie) – Run by the Marist Brothers; opened in 1910; renamed to Marian College in 1946.
- St. Joseph Hospital School of Nursing (Yonkers) – Run by the Sisters of Charity; operated from 1946 to 1978.
- St. Pius X School of Liturgical Music (Purchase) – Run by the Society of the Sacred Heart; operated from 1952 to 1969.

=== K–12 schools ===
The Bronx

- St. John Villa Academy – All-girls' school established in 1932; staffed by the Sisters of St. John the Baptist.

=== High schools ===
==== New York City ====
===== The Bronx =====
- Aquinas Hall Business School – Run by the Dominican Sisters of Sparkill; operated from 1923 to 1939.
- Clason Point Military Academy – Run by the Lasallian Christian Brothers; opened in 1883; moved to Oakdale in 1927 and renamed La Salle Military Academy.
- Manhattan Preparatory School – Run by the Lasallian Christian Brothers; operated from 1854 to 1972.
- Maplehurst Academy of the Sacred Heart – Run by the Religious of the Sacred Heart of Jesus; moved to Greenwich, Connecticut, in 1945.
- Mother Butler High School – Run by the Religious of the Sacred Heart of Mary; opened in 1958; merged in 1974 with Immaculate Heart of Mary High School in Manhattan.
- Mount St. Vincent Academy – Run by the Sisters of Charity; moved to Tuxedo Park in 1942.
- St. Augustine Academy – Parish high school; established in 1888; staffed by the Sisters of Charity.
- St. Brendan Academy – Parish high school; operated from 1931 to 1939.
- St. Helena Commercial High School – Parish high school; opened in 1956; merged with Msgr. Scanlan High School in 2002.
- St. Helena High School for Boys – Parish high school staffed by the Marist Brothers; opened in 1949; renamed to Msgr. Scanlan High School in 1972; merged with Msgr. Scanlan High School for Girls in 1976.
- St. Helena High School for Girls – Parish high school staffed by the Dominican Sisters of Sparkill; opened in 1949; renamed to Msgr. Scanlan High School in 1972; merged with Msgr. Scanlan High School for Boys in 1976.
- St. Nicholas of Tolentine High School – Parish high school; operated from 1927 to 1991; staffed by the Dominican Friars.
- St. Pius V Commercial School – Parish high school; operated from 1930 to 1962; renamed St. Pius V High School in 1962; co-educational from 1930 to 1945; staffed by the Dominican Sisters of Blauvelt.
- St. Pius V High School – All-girls' school operated from 1962 to 2011; staffed by the Dominican Sisters of Blauvelt.
- Ursuline Academy – Run by the Ursuline Sisters; operated from 1911 to 1959.

===== Manhattan =====
- Academy of the Sacred Heart of Mary – Run by the Religious of the Sacred Heart of Mary; operated from 1947 to unknown closing date.
- Academy of the Sacred Heart – Run by the Society of the Sacred Heart; operated from 1841 to 1917.
- All Saints Academy – Staffed by the Sisters of Charity.
- Assisium Secretarial School – Run by the Franciscan Missionary Sisters of the Sacred Heart.
- Bishop Dubois High School – Operated from 1946 to 1976; originally located at 503 & 505 West 152nd Street.
- Blessed Sacrament High School – Parish high school; operated from 1924 to 1964.
- Cathedral High School
  - St. Joseph Annex (109-11 Washington Place) – Operated from 1944 to an unknown closing date.
- De La Salle Institute – Run by the Lasallian Christian Brothers; closed in 1960.
- Hallomas Business School – Run by the Franciscan Missionary Sisters of the Sacred Heart.
- Holy Cross Academy – Run by the Sisters of Charity; operated from 1858 to 1972.
- Holy Rosary Academy – Run by the Sisters of St. Dominic.
- Holy Trinity High School (Manhattan) – Parish high school; closed in 1960.
- Immaculata High School – Parish high school; operated from 1934 to 1989.
- Immaculate Heart of Mary High School – Merged in 1974 with Mother Butler High School in the Bronx.
- Mother Cabrini High School – All-girls' school opened in 1899 by Mother Frances Xavier Cabrini; staffed by the Missionary Sisters of the Sacred Heart of Jesus; closed in June 2014.
- Monsignor Kelly Jr. High School – All-boys' school for gifted and the highest-I.Q. New York County students; closed in 1972.
- Our Lady of Lourdes Academy – Operated from 1912 to 1943; run by the Sisters of St. Ursula; moved to West 79th Street and renamed Notre Dame School.
- Paulist Fathers High School – Run by the Paulist Fathers; operated from 1922 to 1974.
- Power Memorial Academy – Run by the Christian Brothers; closed in 1984.
- Rice High School – All-boys’ school staffed by the Irish Christian Brothers; closed in 2011.
- St. Agnes Boys High School – All-boys' school; staffed by the Marist Brothers; closed in 2013.
- St. Alphonsus Commercial High School for Girls – Parish high school; closed in 1980; staffed by the Sisters, Servants of the Immaculate Heart of Mary.
- St. Ann Academy – Run by the Marist Brothers; operated from 1892 to 1957; moved to Jamaica, Queens, and renamed Archbishop Molloy High School.
- St. Augustine Academy – Opened in 1870; staffed by the Sisters of Charity.
- St. Brigid Academy – Opened in 1856; staffed by the Sisters of Charity.
- St. Gabriel Academy – Opened in 1860; staffed by the Sisters of Charity.
- St. Jerome Academy – Run by the Ursuline Sisters.
- St. Lawrence Academy – Operated from 1854 to 1960; staffed by the Jesuit Fathers and the Sisters of Charity.
- St. Mary Academy – Opened in 1833; run by the Sisters of Charity.
- St. Michael Academy for Boys – Parish high school; operated from 1931 to 1947; staffed by the Sisters of the Presentation of the Blessed Virgin Mary.
- St. Michael Academy for Girls – Parish high school; operated from 1924 to 2010; staffed by the Sisters of the Presentation of the Blessed Virgin Mary.
- St. Vincent de Paul Academy – Run by the Marianite Sisters of the Holy Cross; opened in 1868; moved to Tarrytown in 1922.
- St. Walburga Academy – Operated from 1904 to 1957; staffed by the Society of the Holy Child Jesus; moved to Rye in 1957.
- Thorpe Secretarial School – Operated from 1946 to 1971; staffed by the Sisters of St. Dominic.
- Ursuline Academy – Run by the Ursuline Sisters; opened in 1873; moved to the Bronx in 1911.
- Villa Maria Academy – Run by the Sisters of Notre Dame.

===== Staten Island =====
- Academy of Our Lady of the Blessed Sacrament – Run by the Sisters of Notre Dame.
- Academy of St. Louis – Opened in 1905; staffed by the Marianite Sisters of the Holy Cross.
- Augustinian Academy – Run by the Augustinian Friars; operated from 1899 to 1969.
- St. Peter's High School for Girls – All-girls' school operated from 1917 to 2011.
- St. John Villa Academy – All-girls' school established in 1922 and closed in 2018; run by the Sisters of St. John the Baptist.

==== Dutchess County ====
- Cardinal Farley Military Academy (Rhinecliff) – Run by the Irish Christian Brothers; operated from 1942 to 1971.
- St. Peter High School (Poughkeepsie) – Parish high school staffed by the Marist Brothers; operated from 1927 to 1936.

==== Orange County ====
- Garr Institute (Goshen) – Parish high school; operated from 1904 to 1946; staffed by the Sisters of Charity and the Sisters of the Presentation of the Blessed Virgin Mary; renamed to St. John High School in 1946.
- Ladycliff Academy (Highland Falls) – Operated from 1900 to 1960; staffed by the Missionary Sisters of the Third Order of St. Francis; moved to Mohegan Lake in 1960 and renamed Franciscan High School.
- Mount St. Joseph Academy (New Windsor) – Staffed by the Sisters of the Presentation of the Blessed Virgin Mary.
- Mount St. Mary Academy (Newburgh) – Staffed by the Sisters of St. Dominic.
- Mount St. Vincent Academy (Tuxedo Park) – Opened in 1942; staffed by the Sisters of Charity.
- Our Lady of the Blessed Sacrament Academy (Goshen)
- St. John High School (Goshen) – Archdiocesan high school; operated from 1946 to 1963; staffed by the Sisters of the Presentation of the Blessed Virgin Mary; renamed to John S. Burke Catholic High School in 1963.
- Ursuline Academy of the Sacred Heart (Middletown) – Run by the Ursuline Sisters.

==== Rockland County ====
- Rosary Academy (Sparkill) – Run by the Dominican Sisters of Our Lady of the Rosary; operated from 1956 to 1980.
- School of the Holy Child (Suffern) – Run by the Society of the Holy Child Jesus; closed in 1971.
- St. Agnes School (Sparkill) – Run by the Dominican Sisters of Our Lady of the Rosary; operated from 1876 to 1977.
- St. Mary Villa Academy (Sloatsburg) – Run by the Sisters Servants of Mary Immaculate; operated from 1944 to 1978.

==== Ulster County ====
- Academy of St. Ursula (Kingston) – Run by Sisters of St. Ursula; operated from 1925 to 1966; succeeded by John A. Coleman Catholic High School.
- St. Mary Academy (Kingston) – Parish high school; run by the Sisters of Charity.
- John A. Coleman Catholic High School (Hurley) – Operated from 1966 to 2019.

==== Westchester County ====
- Academy of Our Lady of the Angels (Peekskill) – Run by the Missionary Sisters of the Third Order of St. Francis; operated from 1870 to 1900; moved to Highland Falls in 1900 and renamed Ladycliff Academy.
- Academy of the Resurrection High School (Rye) – Parish high school; operated from 1950 to 1991.
- Academy of St. Aloysius (Yonkers) – Run by the Sisters of Charity; opened in 1868; closed by 1888.
- Blessed Sacrament Academy (Yonkers) – Run by the Sacramentine Sisters; operated from 1915 to 1975.
- Blessed Sacrament High School for Boys (New Rochelle) – Parish high school; merged with St. Gabriel High School for Girls in 1985.
- Blessed Sacrament–St. Gabriel High School (New Rochelle) – Co-educational school established in 1985 by the merger of Blessed Sacrament High School and St. Gabriel High School; operated by the parishes of Blessed Sacrament and St. Gabriel; formerly staffed by the Irish Christian Brothers and the Sisters of Charity; closed in 2013.
- Dominican Academy (Larchmont) – Run by the Sisters of St. Dominic of Newburgh.
- Elizabeth Seton School (Yonkers) – Run by the Sisters of Charity; operated from 1951 to 1964; school buildings used for Elizabeth Seton College.
- Franciscan High School (Mohegan Lake) – Run by the Missionary Sisters of the Third Order of St. Francis; operated from 1960 to 1991.
- Mary Immaculate High School (Ossining) – Run by the Dominican Sisters of Columbus (Ohio); operated from 1915 to 1975.
- Marymount Secondary School (Tarrytown) – Run by the Religious of the Sacred Heart of Mary; closed in 1976.
- Our Lady of Victory Academy (Dobbs Ferry) – All-girls' school operated from 1961 to 2011; operated and staffed by the Sisters of Mercy.
- St. Clare Academy (Hastings-on-Hudson) – Run by the Sisters of St. Francis; closed in 1975.
- St. Gabriel High School for Girls (New Rochelle) – Parish high school; operated from 1924 to 1985; merged with Blessed Sacrament High School for Boys in 1985.
- St. John Academy (White Plains) – Parish high school; staffed by the Sisters of Charity.
- St. Mary High School (Katonah) – Parish high school; operated from 1924 to 1967; succeeded by John F. Kennedy Catholic High School.
- St. Vincent de Paul Academy (Tarrytown) – Run by the Marianite Sisters of the Holy Cross; operated from 1922 to 1978.
- Academy of Our Lady of Good Counsel (White Plains) – Operated from 1922 to 2015; operated and staffed by the Sisters of the Divine Compassion.

=== Elementary schools ===
==== New York City ====
===== The Bronx =====
- Blessed Sacrament Parish School (1160 Beach Avenue) – Operated from 1929 to 2013; formerly staffed by the Sisters of Charity. Sonia Sotomayor was an alumna of this school.
- Holy Family School - Closed in 2023
- Holy Spirit Parish School (1960 University Avenue) – Closed in 2013; Michael Powell of The New York Times wrote that the school's tuition fees were "a pittance compared with a Dalton or a Brearley."
- Immaculate Conception School, East Gun Hill Road - Closed in 2023
- Mount St. Ursula Elementary School – Run by the Ursuline Sisters; operated from 1855 to 1968.
- Nativity of Our Blessed Lady Parish School (3893 Dyre Avenue, Edenwald) – Closed in 2020 due to COVID-19.
- Our Lady of Angels Parish School (2865 Claflin Avenue) – Operated from 1928 to 2013.
- Our Lady of the Assumption Parish School (1617 Parkview Avenue, Pelham Bay) – Closed in 2020 due to COVID-19.
- Our Lady of Mercy Parish School (2512 Marion Avenue) – Formerly staffed by the Dominican Sisters of Sinsinawa; closed in 2013.
- Our Lady of Solace Parish School (Morris Park Avenue at Holland Avenue) – Operated from 1927 to 2005.
- Sacred Heart Private School (1651 Zerega Avenue, Westchester Square) – Operated from 1935 to 2008; administered by the Apostles of the Sacred Heart of Jesus.
- St. Adalbert Parish School – Staffed by the Felician Franciscan Sisters.
- St. Angela Merici School - Closed in 2023
- St. Anthony Parish School (4520 Matilda Avenue) – Operated from 1953 to 2008; merged in 2008 with St. Frances of Rome School; staffed by the Sisters of St. Dominic.
- St. Anthony Parish School (1776 Mansion Street) – Closed in 2013; formerly staffed by the Sisters of Charity.
- St. Ann School (3511 Bainbridge Avenue) – Closed in 2017; formerly staffed by the Dominican Sisters of Sparkill.
- St. Anthony of Padua Parish School (826 East 166th Street) – Operated from 1905 to 1977; staffed by the Sisters of Christian Charity.
- St. Augustine Parish School (1176 Franklin Avenue) – Operated from 1887 to 2011; formerly staffed by the Sisters of Charity and the De La Salle Christian Brothers.
- St. Brendan School - Closed in 2023St.
- St. Dominic Parish School (1684 White Plains Road) – Staffed by the Sisters of St. John the Baptist; closed in 2011.
- St. Frances of Rome Parish School (4321 Barnes Avenue) – Operated from 1929 to 2008; merged in 2008 with St. Anthony School (4520 Matilda Avenue).
- St. Jerome Parish School (222 Alexander Avenue) – Formerly staffed by the De La Salle Christian Brothers; closed in 2013.
- St. Joseph School (Tremont) – Closed 2019.
- St. John Parish School (3141 Kingsbridge Avenue, Kingsbridge) – Staffed by the Religious of Jesus and Mary; formerly staffed by the De La Salle Christian Brothers; closed in 2020 due to COVID-19.
- St. John Vianney Parish School (2141 Seward Avenue) – Operated from 1963 to 2011.
- St. Luke Parish School (608 East 139th Street, Mott Haven) – Closed in 2020 due to COVID-19.
- St. Margaret Mary School - Closed in 2023
- St. Mary Star of the Sea Parish School (580 Minnieford Avenue) – Operated from 1950 to 2013.
- St. Martin of Tours Parish School (695 East 182nd Street, Crotona) – Operated from 1925 to 2011; staffed by the Dominican Sisters.
  - After it opened in 1925, its student body was mostly Irish American and Italian American, and most parents were in the working class fields. African-American and Latino families began entering the area in the 1960s. In its heyday it had over 1,000 students. Throughout the school's life, many of its students originated from immigrant families. The suburban flight of the 1970s and the increasingly low socioeconomic profile of the neighborhood impacted the school. In 2011, it had nine lay teachers and 104 students.
- St. Nicholas of Tolentine School (University Heights) – Closed 2019.
- St. Rita School – Staffed by the Dominican Sisters of Sparkill.
- St. Pius V Parish School (413 East 144th Street) – Closed in 2008.
- St. Thomas Aquinas Parish School (1909 Daly Avenue, Crotona) – Closed in 2020 due to COVID-19.
- St. Valentine Parish School – Staffed by the Daughters of Mary of the Immaculate Conception.
- Sts. Anthony and Frances of Rome Parish School (4520 Matilda Avenue) – Established in 2008 from merger of St. Anthony School and St. Frances of Rome School; closed in 2011.
- Sts. Philips and James Parish School (1160 East 213th Street, Williamsbridge) – Closed in 2020 due to COVID-19.
- Santa Maria School - Closed in 2023

===== Manhattan =====
- Academy of St. Paul and St. Ann - Closed in 2023
- All Saints Parish School (52 East 130th Street) – Formerly staffed by the Irish Christian Brothers and the Sisters of Charity; closed in 2011.
- Annunciation Parish School (461 West 131st Street) – Formerly staffed by the Lasallian Christian Brothers, the Religious of the Sacred Heart of Mary and the Dominican Sisters of St. Mary of the Springs (1922–1978); closed in 2013.
- Ascension School - Closed in 2023
- Assumption Parish School (49th Street) – Staffed by the Sisters of Notre Dame.
- Commander John J. Shea Memorial School (132 East 111th Street) – Opened in 1943; staffed by the Sisters of Mercy and the Irish Christian Brothers.
- Corpus Christi Parish School (535 West 121st Street, Morningside Heights) – Established in 1907; formerly staffed by the Marist Brothers, the Dominican Sisters of Sinsinawa and the Sisters of Charity.; closed in 2020 due to COVID-19.
- Holy Cross Parish School (332 West 43rd Street) – Closed in 2013.
  - The Holy Cross School served the Hells Kitchen/Times Square area; circa 2011, it had about 300 students; some students originated from areas outside of New York City and outside New York State; in 2013, the archdiocese announced that the school was to close; the school had the possibility of remaining open if $720,000 in pledges to the school were obtained, and the school community almost got to the number; however, the school was to be closed anyway.
- Holy Name of Jesus Parish School (202 West 97th Street) – Operated from 1905 to 2013; staffed by the Lasallian Christian Brothers (1905–2013) and the Sisters of Charity (1905–2013).
- Holy Cross Academy Private School – Operated from 1903 to 1950; staffed by the Sisters of Charity.
- Holy Innocents Parish School (West 37th Street) – Closed in 1918.
- Holy Name of Jesus School (West 97th Street) – Closed in 2013.
- Holy Trinity Parish School (West 83rd Street) – Closed by 1979.
- Immaculate Conception School - Closed in 2023
- Mary Help of Christians Parish School – Closed in 2005.
- Our Lady of Loretto Parish School (Elizabeth Street) – Operated from 1927 to 1938.
- Our Lady of Mount Carmel Parish School – Merged with Our Lady of the Holy Rosary School in 1975.
- Our Lady of Pompeii Parish School (240 Bleecker Street) – Established in 1930; staffed by the Apostles of the Sacred Heart of Jesus.; closed in 2020 due to COVID-19.
- Our Lady of Sorrows Parish School (219 Stanton Street) – Closed in 2011.
- Our Lady of the Holy Rosary Parish School (450 East 119th Street) – Opened in 1949 and merged with Our Lady of Mount Carmel School in 1975.
- Our Lady Queen of Martyrs - Closed in 2023
- Resurrection Parish School – Closed in 2005.
- Sacred Hearts of Jesus & Mary Parish School (East 33rd Street) – Operated from 1925 to ??.
- St. Agnes Parish School (East 44th Street) – Opened in 1893; staffed by the Sisters of Charity and the Marist Brothers.
- St. Ambrose Parish School (54th Street) – Operated from 1910 to 1935; staffed by the Sisters of St. Dominic.
- St. Ann Parish School (12th Street) – Opened in 1863; staffed by the Sisters of Charity.
- St. Anthony of Padua Parish School (MacDougal Street) – Opened in 1873; staffed by the Franciscan Sisters of Alleghany.
- St. Bernard/St. Xavier Parish School – Closed in 2001.
- St. Boniface Parish School – Opened in 1868; staffed by the Sisters of St. Dominic.
- St. Brigid School (East Village) – Closed 2019.
- St. Catherine of Genoa Parish School – Closed in 2005; staffed by the Sisters of Mercy.
- St. Catherine of Siena Parish School (411 East 68th Street) – Opened in 1906; staffed by the Sisters of St. Dominic.
- St. Cecilia Parish School (120 East 106th Street, East Harlem) – Closed in 1991; staffed by the Sisters of Mercy and Irish Christian Brothers.
- St. Clare Parish School (West 36th Street) – Staffed by the Franciscan Sisters of Alleghany.
- St. Clemens Mary Parish School (406-12 West 40th Street) – Closed in 1971; staffed by the Sisters of the Resurrection.
- St. Columba Parish School (331 West 25th Street) – Closed in 2006; staffed by the Lasallian Christian Brothers and the Sisters of Charity.
- St. Francis of Assisi Parish School (West 31st Street) – Staffed by the Sisters of St. Francis.
- St. Francis de Sales Academy (East 97th Street) – Closed in 2007; staffed by the Sisters of the Holy Union.
- St. Gabriel Parish School (West 37th Street) – Staffed by the Lasallian Christian Brothers and the Sisters of Charity.
- St. James Parish School (37 St. James Place) – Opened in 1854; merged in 2010 with St. Joseph School on Monroe Street.
- St. James–St. Joseph Parish School (1 Monroe Street) – Opened in 2010 from the merger of St. James School and St. Joseph School; closed in 2013; staffed by the Apostles of the Sacred Heart of Jesus.
- St. Jean Baptiste Parish School (185 East 76th Street) – Operated from 1886 to 1987.
- St. John the Evangelist School (388 East 55th Street) – Opened in 1908.
- St. Joseph Parish School – Closed in 2005.
- St. Joseph of the Holy Family Parish School (168 Morningside Avenue) – Operated from 1860 to 2011; formerly staffed by the School Sisters of Notre Dame.
- St. Jude Parish School (433 West 204th Street) – Operated from 1952 to 2013.
- St. Lawrence Academy School (42 East 84th Street) – Closed in 1960; staffed by the Sisters of Charity.
- St. Michael Parish School (West 32nd Street at Ninth Avenue) – Operated from 1870 to 1971; staffed by the Sisters of the Presentation of the Blessed Virgin Mary.
- St. Monica Parish School (416 East 80th Street) – Operated from 1883 to 1974; staffed by the Sisters of Charity (1883–1944) and the Sisters of St. Francis (1944–1974).
- St. Patrick Old Cathedral School (233 Mott Street) – Operated from 1822 to 2010; staffed by the Sisters of Charity.
- St. Paul the Apostle Parish School (415 West 59th Street) – Run by the Paulist Fathers; operated from 1886 to 1974.
- St. Rose of Lima School (Washington Heights) – Closed 2019. Area parents did not expect the development as a new principal had been recently appointed.
- St. Stephen the Martyr Parish School (East 28th Street near Lexington Avenue) – Staffed by the Sisters of Mercy.
- St Thomas the Apostle School (118 St. Nicholas Avenue) – Staffed by the Sisters.

===== Staten Island =====
- Immaculate Conception School (Stapleton) – Closed in 2013; the archdiocese stated that the number of students was too low and that the school could not receive enough income; had 216 students in 2013.
- Our Lady Help of Christians School (Tottenville) – Closed 2019.
- Our Lady of Mount Carmel/St. Benedicta Parish School (Port Richmond) – Closed in 2020 due to COVID-19.
- St. Christopher School - Closed in 2023
- St. Joseph's School (Rosebank) – Closed in 2013; that year it had 167 students.
- St. Joseph and St. Thomas Parish School (50 Maguire Avenue, Prince's Bay) – Established in 1966; formerly staffed by the Marianites of Holy Cross (1966–1989);; closed in 2020 due to COVID-19.
- St. Margaret Mary Parish School (Midland Beach) – Closed in 2011; in its final year it had 74 students, giving it a 30% utilization rate.
- St. Mary Parish School (Rosebank) – Closed in 2011; in its final year it had 224 students, 90% of the building's capacity. Amy Padnani of the Staten Island Advance stated that despite the high utilization of the building, it was one of Staten Island's oldest Catholic school facilities and therefore "some speculate the school was chosen because of infrastructure problems".
- Saint Paul Elementary School (New Brighton) – Closed in 2006; in 2011, Saint Peter Elementary moved into its building.
- St. Roch Parish School (465 Villa Avenue, Port Richmond) – Staffed by the Sisters of St. John the Baptist; closed in 2011; in its final year it had 96 students, meaning the building was 35% utilized.
- St. Sylvester School (Concord) – Closed in 2011; in its final year it had 120 students, which meant it was 31% utilized.
- St. Peter–St. Paul Parish School (Randall Manor) – St. Peter had 210 students in 2011; in 2011, St. Peter moved from the former building in New Brighton to the ex-St. Paul Elementary School in New Brighton; that school had closed in 2006; the school changed its name after the move; closed in 2020 due to COVID-19.
- Immaculate Conception – Closed in 2013.
- Assumption School

==== Dutchess County ====
- Immaculate Conception Parish School (Amenia) – Operated from 1881 to 1986; staffed by the Sisters of St. Ursula and the Sisters of St. Dominic.
- Our Lady of Mount Carmel Parish School (Poughkeepsie) – Operated from 1930 to 2007.
- Regina Coeli Parish School (Hyde Park) – Established in 1955.
- St. Joachim Parish School (Beacon) – Staffed by the Sisters of Charity; merged with St. John the Evangelist School.
- St. Joachim–St. John Parish School (Beacon) – Closed in 2001.
- St. John the Evangelist Parish School (Beacon) – Staffed by the Sisters of Mercy; merged with St. Joachim School.
- St. Joseph Parish School (Millbrook) – Closed in 2013.
- St. Joseph Parish School (Poughkeepsie) – Closed in 1966; also known as Mount Carmel South; formerly staffed by the Sisters of the Resurrection.
- St. Mary Parish School (Poughkeepsie) – Opened in 1878; formerly staffed by the Sisters of Charity and the Sisters of St. Dominic.
- St. Mary Elementary School (Wappingers Falls) – Opened in September 1893; had 118 students in 2019, when it closed; formerly staffed by the Sisters of Charity.
- St. Michael Parish School (Poughkeepsie) – Staffed by the Sisters of Christian Charity.
- St. Peter Parish School (Poughkeepsie) – Established in 1844.
- St. Sylvia Parish School (Tivoli) – Established in 1888; staffed by the Sisters of Charity.

==== Orange County ====
- Holy Name of Mary Parish School (Montgomery) – Opened in 1900.
- Sacred Heart of Jesus Parish School (Highland Falls) – Operated from 1930 to 2011; formerly staffed by the Franciscan Missionary Sisters of the Sacred Heart; the archdiocese suggested that parents send their children to St. Gregory Barbarigo School in Garnerville.
- St. Anastasia Parish School (Harriman)
- St. Columba Parish School (Chester) – Operated from 1908 to 1991; staffed by the Sisters of St. Dominic; closed in 1991.
- St. Francis of Assisi Parish School (Newburgh) – Staffed by the Sisters of the Resurrection.
- St. Joseph Parish School (Middletown) – Operated from 1887 to 2011; formerly staffed by the Ursuline Sisters.
- St. Joseph Parish School (New Windsor) – Operated from 1966 to 2011; later operated as Divine Mercy School, which closed in 2020; in 2021, the archdiocese sold it to a yeshiva operator, Yeshiva Ketana Satmar KJ.
- St. Thomas of Canterbury Parish School (Cornwall-on-Hudson) – Closed in 2011.
- St. Mary Parish School (Newburgh) – Closed in 1971; staffed by the Sisters of Charity.
- St. Mary Parish School (Port Jervis) – Closed in 1971; staffed by the Franciscan Sisters of Allegheny and the Sisters of Charity.
- St. Patrick Parish School (Newburgh) – Staffed by the Lasallian Christian Brothers and the Sisters of Charity.

==== Putnam County ====
- Our Lady of Loretto Parish School (Cold Spring) – Operated from 1913 to 1977; staffed by the Franciscan Missionary Sisters of the Sacred Heart/Franciscan Sisters of Peace.
- St. John the Evangelist Parish School (Mahopac) – Closed in 2011.
- St. Lawrence O'Toole Parish School (Brewster) – Operated from 1927 to 2008; staffed by the Sisters of the Divine Compassion.

==== Rockland County ====
- Immaculate Conception Parish School (Stony Point) – Closed in 2008; staffed by the Sisters of Charity.
- Our Lady of the Sacred Heart Parish School (Tappan) – Operated from 1965 to 1992; staffed by the Dominican Sisters of Blauvelt.
- St. Ann Parish School (Nyack) – Operated from 1892 to 2003; staffed by the Sisters of St. Dominic.
- St. Augustine Parish Elementary School (New City) – Closed in 2013.
- St. Catharine Parish School (Blauvelt) – Operated from 1957 to 2008.
- St. Joseph Parish School (Spring Valley) – Operated from 1927 to 2005.
- St. Michael Parish School (Rockland Lake) – Operated from 1907 to 1927; staffed by the Sisters of St. Agnes.
- St. Peter Parish School (Haverstraw) – Operated from 1863 to 2013; formerly staffed by the Sisters of Charity (1884–?).
  - In 2012, after the archdiocese announced that it could potentially be closed, the school community did a fundraising drive as the school was told it could remain open if a plan to raise $500,000 annually was produced. That year the school's per-student cost was $5,500 but it relied on archdiocese funds as it deliberately had tuition below cost, at $3,600, so children of working class backgrounds could attend. It had an increasing enrollment at the time of closure, with 328 students in its final year.

==== Sullivan County ====
- Holy Cross Parish School (Callicoon) – Operated from 1925 to 1981; staffed by the Franciscan Sisters of Allegheny.
- Our Lady of the Angels Parish School (Jeffersonville) – Operated from 1954 to 1968; staffed by the Franciscan Sisters of Allegheny.
- St. Aloysius School (Livingston Manor) – Opened in 1904; closed after 1971; formerly staffed by the Dominican Sisters of Blauvelt.
- St. Joseph Mountain School (Forestburgh) – Operated as a boarding school by the Sisters of St. Dominic.
- St. Mary Parish School (Obernburg) – Opened in 1882; run by the Sisters of St. Dominic.
- St. Peter Parish School (Monticello) – Run by the Sisters of St. Dominic.
- St. Peter's Regional School (Liberty) – Closed in 2019, with 42 students; was the final remaining Catholic school in Sullivan County; school became an early learning center in 2016 after an earlier plan to close the school was canceled; the Catholic schools in closest proximity to St. Peters are Our Lady of Mount Carmel Elementary School in Wallkill and St. John Elementary School in Goshen.

==== Ulster County ====
- Immaculate Conception Parish School (Kingston) – Staffed by the Felician Sisters.
- St. Augustine Parish School (Highland) – Operated from 1958 to 2011; formerly staffed by the Missionary Sisters of the Sacred Heart (1958–1973).
- St. Catherine Laboure Parish School (Lake Katrine) – Operated from 1959 to 1972; staffed by the Dominican Sisters of Sparkill.
- St. Joseph School (Kingston) – Had 267 students in 2007; was originally scheduled to close in 2013; however, the archdiocese reversed course and allowed it to stay open; closed in 2017; by spring 2017, the school had 146 students; the would-be enrollment had dropped to 90 for the 2017–2018 school year; Kingston Catholic School acquired the St. Joseph building and turned it into its middle school facility; older building was put up for sale in 2019.
- St. Joseph Parish School (New Paltz) – Operated from 1949 to 1970; staffed by the Benedictine Sisters of Elizabeth (1949–1970).
- St. Mary Parish School (Kingston) – Merged with St. Peter School in 1970 to form Kingston Catholic; staffed by the Sisters of Charity.
- St. Mary of the Snow Parish School (Saugerties) – Operated from 1882 to 2013; formerly staffed by the Sisters of Charity.
  - In 1995, the school had 153 students, while in 1999 it had 227 students; principal Christine Molinelli stated that she was able to successfully campaign to increase the enrollment in the 1990s; there were 89 students in 2013. Father Chris Berean stated that he had been able to convince 14 families to send their children to St. Mary of the Snow in 2013, as the archdiocese stated it may stay open if enrollment reached 120; the archdiocese closed it anyway.
- St. Peter Parish School (Kingston) – Opened in 1858 and merged with St. Mary School in 1970 to form Kingston Catholic; staffed by the Sisters of Charity (1877–88) and the Sisters of Christian Charity (1888–??).
- St. Peter Parish School (Rosendale) – Operated from 1890 to 2001; staffed by the Sisters of Charity.

==== Westchester County ====
- Assumption Parish School (Peekskill) – Operated from 1907 to 2013; staffed by the Missionary Sisters of St. Francis.
- Assumption Parish School (Tuckahoe) – Operated from 1960 to 1979; staffed by the Religious Teachers Filippini.
- Blessed Sacrament Academy Grade School (Yonkers) – Operated from 1915 to 1961; operated and staffed by the Sacramentine Nuns.
- Blessed Sacrament Parish School (New Rochelle) – Operated from 1866 to 2007; staffed by the Ursuline Sisters (1924–1995).
- Christ the King Parish School (Yonkers) – Closed in 2011.
- Corpus Christi Parish School (Port Chester) – Operated from 1959 to 2008; merged with Holy Rosary in Port Chester; staffed by the Salesian Sisters of Don Bosco.
- Elizabeth Ann Seton Academy (Yonkers) – Opened in 1898; operated and staffed by the Sisters of Charity.
- Good Counsel Academy Elementary School (White Plains and Valhalla) – Operated from 1922 to 2017; relocated from White Plains to Valhalla in 2015; sponsored by the Sisters of the Divine Compassion.
- Holy Eucharist Parish School (Yonkers) – Opened in 1909 and closed in 1936; staffed by the Sisters of Mercy.
- Holy Family Parish School (New Rochelle) – Operated from 1920 to 2005; staffed by the Dominican Sisters of Newburgh; reopened in 2018; closed in 2020.
- Holy Name of Jesus Parish School (Valhalla) – Operated from 1963 to 2013.
- Holy Name of Jesus School (New Rochelle) – Operated from 1953 to 2018; relocated to Holy Family Parish where it was known as Holy Family School; closed permanently in 2020; formerly staffed by the Franciscan Sisters of Hastings-on-Hudson.
- Holy Rosary Parish School (Hawthorne) – Closed in 2008.
- Holy Rosary Parish School (Port Chester) – Operated from 1945 to 2008; merged in 2008 with Corpus Christi in Port Chester.
- Holy Name of Mary Parish School (Croton-on-Hudson) – Operated from 1929 to ~1985; staffed by the Franciscan Sisters of Peace/Franciscan Missionary Sisters of the Sacred Heart.
- Immaculate Conception Parish School (Irvington) – Closed in 2008; staffed by the Franciscan Sisters of Peace.
- Most Holy Trinity Parish School (Mamaroneck) – Closed in 1986; staffed by the Franciscan Sisters of Hastings-on-Hudson and the Sisters of Charity of New York.
- Most Holy Trinity Parish School (Yonkers) – Closed in 1986; staffed by the Sisters of Ss. Cyril & Methodius and the Sisters of St. Dominic.
- Mount Carmel–St. Anthony School (Yonkers) – Operated from 1963 to 2005; parish operated by Pallottine Fathers; formerly staffed by the Missionary Canonesses of St. Augustine.
- Our Lady of Fatima Parish School (Scarsdale) – Operated from 1950 to 2013; formerly staffed by the Dominican Sisters.
- Our Lady of Mercy/St. Mary Parish School (Port Chester) – Operated from 1848 to 1993; staffed by the Sisters of Charity of New York (1868–1993).
- Our Lady of Mount Carmel Parish School (Mount Vernon) – Operated from 1925 to 1991; staffed by the Franciscan Sisters of Allegheny (1925–1981).
- Our Lady of the Rosary Parish School (Yonkers) – Opened in 1908; staffed by the Sisters of St. Dominic of Blauvelt.
- Sacred Heart Parish School (Dobbs Ferry) – Staffed by the Sisters of Mercy.
- Sacred Heart School for the Arts Parish School (Mount Vernon) – Operated from 1894 to 2011; formerly staffed by the Sisters of Mercy.
- St. Ann Parish School (Ossining) – Closed in 2011.
- St. Anthony of Padua Parish School (West Harrison) – Staffed by the Sisters of the Divine Compassion; closed in 2011.
- St. Augustine Parish School (Larchmont) – Operated from 1912 to 1976; staffed by the Dominican Sisters of Newburgh (1912–1973).
- St. Bartholomew Parish School (Yonkers) – Operated from 1913 to 2011; formerly staffed by the Sisters of St. Dominic and Presentation Sisters of the Blessed Virgin Mary.
- St. Bernard Parish School (White Plains) – Closed in 1977.
- St. Casimir Parish School (Yonkers) – Operated from 1905 to 2013; formerly staffed by the Sisters of the Resurrection (1905–1997).
- St. Catharine Parish School (Pelham) – Opened in 1907; staffed by the Sisters of St. Francis of Hastings-on-Hudson.
- St. Denis Parish School (Yonkers) – Operated from 1926 to 2006; staffed by the Sisters of Charity.
- St. Elizabeth Ann Seton School (Shrub Oak) – Operated from 1966 to 2020; staffed by the Sisters of Charity.
- St. Francis of Assisi School (Mount Kisco) – Staffed by the Sisters of Charity.
- St. Gabriel Parish School (New Rochelle) – Operated from 1898 to 1976; staffed by the Sisters of Charity.
- St. Gregory the Great Parish School (Harrison) – Operated from 1953 to 2002.
- St. Hyacinth School for Boys (Hawthorne) – Operated from 1892 to 1932; run by the Sisters of St. Dominic.
- St. John & St. Mary Parish School (Chappaqua) – Operated from 1959 to 1972; staffed by the Sisters of the Presentation.
- St. John the Evangelist Parish School (White Plains) – Operated from 1888 to 2006; staffed by the Sisters of Charity.
- St. Joseph's Parish School (Croton Falls) – Staffed by the Sisters of the Divine Compassion (2010–2011); closed in 2011.
- St. Joseph Parish School (New Rochelle) – Opened in 1909; staffed by the Sisters of St. Francis of Hastings-on-Hudson.
- St. Joseph Parish School (Yonkers) – Operated from 1872 to 1992; staffed by the Sisters of Charity (1881–?).
- St. Mary Parish School (Yonkers) – Operated from 1857 to 2011; staffed by the Sisters of Charity of New York (1857–2011); formerly staffed by the De La Salle Christian Brothers (1861–1968).
- St. Mary of the Assumption Parish School (Katonah) – Closed in 1993.
- St. Matthew Parish School (Hastings-on-Hudson) – Operated from 1889 to 2005; staffed by the Franciscan Sisters of Peace.
- St. Michael Greek Parish School (Yonkers) – Opened in 1954; staffed by the Sisters of St. Basil the Great.
- St. Nicholas of Myra Ruthenian Parish School (Yonkers) – Opened in 1912.
- St. Patrick Parish School (Verplanck) – Operated from 1891 to 1991; staffed by the Missionary Sisters of St. Francis/Franciscan Sisters of Peace.
- St. Patrick School (Bedford) – Operated from 1956 to 2020; staffed by the Sisters of Charity.
- St. Paul School (Yonkers) – Operated from 1949 to 2020; staffed by the Sisters of the Presentation of the Blessed Virgin Mary.
- St. Pius X Parish School (Scarsdale) – Operated from 1956 to 2005; staffed by the Dominican Sisters of Sparkill.
- St. Teresa of Avila Parish School (Sleepy Hollow) – Operated from 1885 to 1993; staffed by the Missionary Sisters of St. Francis/Franciscan Sisters of Peace (1885–1984).
- St. Theresa Parish School (Briarcliff Manor) – Closed in 2013.
- St. Thomas Parish School (Pleasantville) – Closed in 1972; staffed by the Sisters of St. Dominic.
- St. Vito Parish School (Mamaroneck) – Operated from 1960 to 1986; staffed by the Dominican Sisters of Sparkill.
- Sts. Peter & Paul Parish School (Mount Vernon) – Operated from 1949 to 2011; formerly staffed by the Sisters of the Holy Child.
