= Millbrook High School (New York) =

Location
- 70 Church Street; Millbrook, NY, 12545; United States
- Coordinates: 41°46′54″N 73°41′16″W

Information
- School type: High school
- Founded: 2006
- Principal: Eric T. Seipp
- Grades: 9-12
- Enrollment: 252 (2024–2025)
- Colors: Royal blue, white, and gray
- Nickname: Blazers
- Website: https://mhs.millbrookcsd.org/
- Last updated: May 21, 2020

Millbrook High School is a part of the Millbrook Central School System (grades 9-12). It is located in Millbrook, Dutchess County, New York. The address of the school is 70 Church Street, Millbrook, NY. Built between 2005 and 2006, and opening in September 2006, it is the newest school in the Millbrook Central School District.

== Administration ==
- Ms. Caroline Hernandez-Pidala - Interim Superintendent of Schools
- Mr. Elliot Garcia - Assistant Superintendent of Schools
- Mr. Eric T. Seipp - Principal

== Academics ==
Millbrook has a small amount of AP Classes. A few include:

- AP English Literature and Composition
- AP European History
- AP Geography
- AP Calculus (AB/BC)

In addition Millbrook High School also offers numerous courses through Dutchess Community College and Marist College.

== Music ==
Millbrook High School's music curriculum is administered by Mr. Daniel Dunninger and Mrs. Jennifer Tibbetts.

- The Millbrook High School Concert Band is conducted by Mr. Daniel Dunninger, has approximately 80 students, performs at a few concerts every year, in addition to playing in a music competition every spring.
- The Millbrook High School Jazz Band is also conducted by Mr. Daniel Dunninger. The Millbrook Jazz Band performs at many concerts and competitions throughout the year, both for the school and the community. Although most of the players in the Jazz Band are drawn from the Concert Band, some students are encouraged to join the group by Daniel Dunninger.
- The Millbrook High School Mixed Chorus is directed by Mrs. Jennifer Tibbetts. Considerably larger than the Concert Band, the Mixed Chorus performs in many of the same concerts in which the Concert Band plays.

In addition to the ensembles listed above, Millbrook High School also has a select choral group, and the Madrigals, which is a mixed group.

== Athletics ==
Millbrook High School competes in Division 4 of the Mid Hudson Athletic League or MHAL along with the high schools of Coleman Catholic, Rhinebeck and Webutuck. Other member schools include Ellenville, Highland, Hyde Park (FDR), Marlboro, New Paltz, Onteora, Pine Plains, Red Hook, Rondout Valley, Saugerties, Spackenkill, and Wallkill. MHAL is Section 9 of the New York State Public High School Athletic Association or NYSPHSAA.

- Baseball
- Basketball (Boys' and Girls')
- Cross Country (Boys' and Girls')
- Cheerleading
- Golf
- Football
- Soccer (Boys' and Girls')
- Softball
- Tennis (Boys')
- Track, Winter and Spring
- Volleyball
- Wrestling
- Lacrosse (Boys' and Girls')

== School organizations and clubs ==
- Drama Club
- Interact Club (sponsored by Rotary International)
- National Honor Society
- Yearbook
- AHA (Athletes Helping Athletes)
- Media Club
- Environment Club
- Model UN
- Student Council
- Art Club
- Book Club
- Sadd Club
- Spece Club
- Madrigals
