= November 21 =

November 21 this year in various calendars
- Saturday, 21 November 2026
Akan	Nkyimemene
Armenian	4 Kʿaloch 1476
Aztec	Tlacaxipehualiztli 10, 4 Calli
Babylonian	10 Arakhsamna, 2337 SE
Balinese pawukon	Menga, Kajeng, Sri, Paing, Urukung, Saniscara of Ukir, Ludra, Dadi, Dewa
Bengali	6 Ogrohayon, BS 1433
Chinese	Yin Earth Pig・Girl Mansion; Fire Horse Year, Month 10, Day 13 (Lidong, 1 day until Xiaoxue)
Common Era	21 November 2026 CE
Coptic	12 Hathor, AM 1743
Egyptian	9 Pharmuthi, 2775 NE
Ethiopian	12 H̱edār, 2019 Amätä Məhrät
French Republican	Décade III, Décadi de Brumaire de l'Année 235 de la République
Gregorian	21 November, AD 2026
Hebrew	11 Kislev, AM 5787
Hindu	Revatī・Vajra; Solar: 5 Mārgaśīrṣa, 1948 SE; Lunisolar: Dvādaśī, Śukla pakṣa of Kārtika, 2083 VE; Rāudra・5127 KY・1,872,900
Icelandic	Laugardagur, 29 Gormánuður 2026
Islamic	10 Jumada al-thani, AH 1448 (using tabular method)
ISO week date	2026-W47-6
Japanese	13 Kannazuki, Reiwa 8 (Rittō, 1 day until Shōsetsu)
Julian	8 November, AD 2026 (AM 7535)
Julian day	2461366
Korean	13 Dwaejidal, 4359 DE
Maya	13.0.14.2.3; 16 Ceh, 4 Akbal
Roman	ante diem VI Idus Novembres, MMDCCLXXIX AUC
Solar Hijri	30 Aban, SH 1405
Tibetan	12 smin drug, me pho rta 2153 or 1772 or 1000

<<	November					>>
Su	Mo	Tu	We	Th	Fr	Sa
1	2	3	4	5	6	7
8	9	10	11	12	13	14
15	16	17	18	19	20	21
22	23	24	25	26	27	28
29	30
2026

November 21 in recent years
2026 (Saturday)
2025 (Friday)
2024 (Thursday)
2023 (Tuesday)
2022 (Monday)
2021 (Sunday)
2020 (Saturday)
2019 (Thursday)
2018 (Wednesday)
2017 (Tuesday)

November 21 is the 325th day of the year (326th in leap years) in the Gregorian calendar; 40 days remain until the end of the year.

== Events ==
=== Pre-1600 ===
- 164 BCE – Judas Maccabeus, son of Mattathias of the Hasmonean family, rededicates the Temple in Jerusalem, an event that is commemorated each year by the festival of Hanukkah. (25 Kislev 3597 in the Hebrew calendar.)
- 235 – Pope Anterus succeeds Pontian as the nineteenth pope.
- 1009 – The Lý dynasty in Vietnam is proclaimed by Emperor Lý Thái Tổ.
- 1386 – Timur of Samarkand captures and sacks the Georgian capital of Tbilisi, taking King Bagrat V of Georgia captive.

=== 1601–1900 ===
- 1620 – Plymouth Colony settlers sign the Mayflower Compact (November 11, O.S.)
- 1676 – The Danish astronomer Ole Rømer presents the first quantitative measurements of the speed of light.
- 1739 – The fortress of Portobello, Panama, surrenders to a Royal Navy squadron under Edward Vernon during the War of Jenkins' Ear.
- 1783 – In Paris, Jean-François Pilâtre de Rozier and François Laurent d'Arlandes make the first untethered hot air balloon flight.
- 1789 – North Carolina ratifies the United States Constitution and is admitted as the 12th U.S. state.
- 1851 – Mutineers take control of the Chilean penal colony of Punta Arenas in the Strait of Magellan.
- 1861 – American Civil War: Confederate President Jefferson Davis appoints Judah Benjamin Secretary of War.
- 1877 – Thomas Edison announces his invention of the phonograph, a machine that can record and play sound.
- 1894 – Port Arthur, China, falls to the Japanese, a decisive victory of the First Sino-Japanese War; Japanese troops are accused of massacring the remaining inhabitants.
- 1900 – Claude Monet's paintings shown at Gallery Durand-Ruel in Paris.

=== 1901–present ===
- 1902 – The Philadelphia Football Athletics defeat the Kanaweola Athletic Club of Elmira, New York, 39–0, in the first-ever professional American football night game.
- 1905 – Albert Einstein's paper that leads to the mass–energy equivalence formula, E = mc², is published in the journal Annalen der Physik.
- 1910 – Sailors on board Brazil's warships including the Minas Gerais, São Paulo, and Bahia, violently rebel in what is now known as the Revolta da Chibata (Revolt of the Lash).
- 1916 – World War I: One of the mines laid by SM U-73 sink HMHS Britannic in the Kea Channel, the largest ship lost in the war.
- 1918 – The Flag of Estonia, previously used by pro-independence activists, is formally adopted as the national flag of the Republic of Estonia.
- 1918 – The Parliament (Qualification of Women) Act 1918 is passed, allowing women to stand for Parliament in the UK.
- 1918 – A pogrom takes place in Lwów (now Lviv); over three days, at least 50 Jews and 270 Ukrainian Christians are killed by Poles.
- 1920 – Irish War of Independence: On "Bloody Sunday" in Dublin, the Irish Republican Army (IRA) assassinated a group of British Intelligence agents, and British forces killed 14 civilians at a Gaelic football match at Croke Park.
- 1922 – Rebecca Latimer Felton of Georgia takes the oath of office, becoming the first female United States Senator.
- 1927 – Columbine Mine massacre: Striking coal miners are allegedly attacked with machine guns by a detachment of Colorado state police dressed in civilian clothes.
- 1942 – The completion of the Alaska Highway (also known as the Alcan Highway) is celebrated (however, the highway is not usable by standard road vehicles until 1943).
- 1944 – World War II: American submarine USS Sealion sinks the Japanese battleship Kongō and Japanese destroyer Urakaze in the Formosa Strait.
- 1945 – The United Auto Workers strike 92 General Motors plants in 50 cities to back up worker demands for a 30-percent raise.
- 1950 – Two Canadian National Railway trains collide in northeastern British Columbia in the Canoe River train crash; the death toll is 21, with 17 of them Canadian troops bound for Korea.
- 1953 – The Natural History Museum, London announces that the "Piltdown Man" skull, initially believed to be one of the most important fossilized hominid skulls ever found, is a hoax.
- 1954 – People's Action Party, an eventual dominative political party in Singapore, was established.
- 1959 – American disc jockey Alan Freed, who had popularized the term "rock and roll" and music of that style, is fired from WABC radio over allegations he had participated in the payola scandal.
- 1961 – "La Ronde" opens in Honolulu, the first revolving restaurant in the United States.
- 1962 – The Chinese People's Liberation Army declares a unilateral ceasefire in the Sino-Indian War.
- 1964 – The Verrazzano–Narrows Bridge opens to traffic. At the time it is the world's longest bridge span.
- 1964 – Second Vatican Council: The third session of the Roman Catholic Church's ecumenical council closes.
- 1967 – Vietnam War: American General William Westmoreland tells news reporters: "I am absolutely certain that whereas in 1965 the enemy was winning, today he is certainly losing."
- 1969 – U.S. President Richard Nixon and Japanese Premier Eisaku Satō agree on the return of Okinawa to Japanese control in 1972. The U.S. retains rights to bases on the island, but these are to be nuclear-free.
- 1969 – The first permanent ARPANET link is established between UCLA and SRI.
- 1970 – Vietnam War: Operation Ivory Coast: A joint United States Air Force and Army team raids the Sơn Tây prisoner-of-war camp in an attempt to free American prisoners of war thought to be held there.
- 1971 – Indian troops, partly aided by Mukti Bahini (Bengali guerrillas), defeat the Pakistan army in the Battle of Garibpur.
- 1972 – Voters in South Korea overwhelmingly approve a new constitution, giving legitimacy to Park Chung Hee and the Fourth Republic.
- 1974 – The Birmingham pub bombings kill 21 people. The Birmingham Six are sentenced to life in prison for the crime but are later exonerated.
- 1977 – Minister of Internal Affairs Allan Highet announces that the national anthems of New Zealand shall be the traditional anthem "God Save the Queen" and "God Defend New Zealand".
- 1979 – The United States Embassy in Islamabad, Pakistan, is attacked by a mob and set on fire, killing four.
- 1980 – A deadly fire breaks out at the MGM Grand Hotel in Paradise, Nevada (now Bally's Las Vegas). Eighty-five people are killed and more than 650 are injured in the worst disaster in Nevada history.
- 1985 – United States Navy intelligence analyst Jonathan Pollard is arrested for spying after being caught giving Israel classified information on Arab nations. He is subsequently sentenced to life in prison.
- 1986 – National Security Council member Oliver North and his secretary start to shred documents allegedly implicating them in the Iran–Contra affair.
- 1989 – Aeroflot Flight 37577 crashes on approach to Sovetsky Airport, killing 32.
- 1990 – Bangkok Airways Flight 125 crashes on approach to Samui Airport, killing 38.
- 1992 – A major tornado strikes the Houston, Texas area during the afternoon. Over the next two days the largest tornado outbreak ever to occur in the US during November spawns over 100 tornadoes.
- 1995 – The Dayton Agreement is initialed at the Wright-Patterson Air Force Base, near Dayton, Ohio, ending three and a half years of war in Bosnia and Herzegovina.
- 1996 – Humberto Vidal explosion: Thirty-three people die when a Humberto Vidal shoe shop in Río Piedras, Puerto Rico explodes.
- 1998 – Finnish satanist Jarno Elg kills a 23-year-old man and performs a ritual-like cutting and eating of body parts in Hyvinkää, Finland.
- 2002 – NATO invites Bulgaria, Estonia, Latvia, Lithuania, Romania, Slovakia and Slovenia to become members.
- 2002 – Arturo Guzmán Decena, founder of Los Zetas and high-member of the Gulf Cartel, is killed in a shoot-out with the Mexican Army and the police.
- 2004 – The second round of the Ukrainian presidential election is held, giving rise to massive protests and controversy over the election's integrity.
- 2004 – Dominica is hit by the most destructive earthquake in its history. The northern half of the island sustains the most damage, especially the town of Portsmouth. In neighboring Guadeloupe, one person is killed.
- 2004 – The Paris Club agrees to write off 80% (up to $100 billion) of Iraq's external debt.
- 2004 – China Eastern Airlines Flight 5210 crashes after takeoff from Baotou Donghe Airport, killing 55.
- 2006 – Anti-Syrian Lebanese politician and government minister Pierre Gemayel is assassinated in suburban Beirut.
- 2009 – A mine explosion in Heilongjiang, China kills 108.
- 2012 – At least 28 are wounded after a bomb is thrown onto a bus in Tel Aviv.
- 2013 – Fifty-four people are killed when the roof of a shopping center collapses in Riga, Latvia.
- 2013 – Massive protests start in Ukraine after President Viktor Yanukovych suspended signing the Ukraine–European Union Association Agreement.
- 2014 – A stampede in Kwekwe, Zimbabwe caused by the police firing tear gas kills at least eleven people and injures 40 others.
- 2015 – The government of Belgium imposes a security lockdown on Brussels, including the closure of shops, schools, and public transportation, due to potential terrorist attacks.
- 2017 – Robert Mugabe formally resigns as President of Zimbabwe, after thirty-seven years in office.
- 2019 – Israeli Prime Minister Benjamin Netanyahu is indicted on charges of bribery, fraud, and breach of trust.
- 2019 – Tesla launches the SUV Cybertruck. A gaffe occurs during the launch event when its "unbreakable" windows shatter during demonstration.
- 2021 – An SUV plows through a Christmas parade in Waukesha, Wisconsin, killing six and injuring 62.
- 2022 – A magnitude 5.6 earthquake on the Indonesian island of Java kills between 335 and 602 people.

== Births ==
=== Pre-1600 ===
- 1495 – John Bale, English bishop and historian (died 1563)
- 1567 – Anne de Xainctonge, French saint, founded the Society of the Sisters of Saint Ursula of the Blessed Virgin (died 1621)

=== 1601–1900 ===
- 1631 – Catharina Questiers, Dutch poet (died 1669)
- 1692 – Carlo Innocenzo Frugoni, Italian poet and academic (died 1768)
- 1694 – Voltaire, French writer and philosopher (died 1778)
- 1718 – Friedrich Wilhelm Marpurg, German composer, critic, and theorist (died 1795)
- 1729 – Josiah Bartlett, American physician and politician, 6th Governor of New Hampshire (died 1795)
- 1760 – Joseph Plumb Martin, American sergeant (died 1850)
- 1768 – Friedrich Schleiermacher, German theologian, philosopher, and scholar (died 1834)
- 1785 – William Beaumont, American surgeon, "Father of Gastric Physiology" (died 1853)
- 1787 – Samuel Cunard, Canadian businessman, founded the Cunard Line (died 1865)
- 1811 – Ludwik Gorzkowski, Polish politician, physicist, and revolutionary activist (died 1857)
- 1818 – Lewis H. Morgan, American lawyer, anthropologist, and theorist (died 1881)
- 1834 – Hetty Green, American businesswoman and financier (died 1916)
- 1840 – Victoria, Princess Royal of England (died 1901)
- 1851 – Désiré-Joseph Mercier, Belgian cardinal and theologian (died 1926)
- 1852 – Francisco Tárrega, Spanish guitarist and composer (died 1909)
- 1853 – Hussein Kamel of Egypt (died 1917)
- 1854 – Pope Benedict XV (died 1922)
- 1863 – Arthur Quiller-Couch, Cornish novelist and editor (The Oxford Book Of English Verse 1250–1900) (died 1944)
- 1866 – Sigbjørn Obstfelder, Norwegian poet and author (died 1900)
- 1866 – Konishiki Yasokichi I, Japanese sumo wrestler, the 17th Yokozuna (died 1914)
- 1870 – Alexander Berkman, Lithuanian-American activist and author (died 1936)
- 1870 – Joe Darling, Australian cricketer and politician (died 1946)
- 1870 – Stanley Jackson, English cricketer and politician (died 1947)
- 1876 – Olav Duun, Norwegian author and educator (died 1939)
- 1877 – Sigfrid Karg-Elert, German composer and educator (died 1933)
- 1878 – Gustav Radbruch, German lawyer and politician, German Minister of Justice (died 1949)
- 1886 – Harold Nicolson, English author and politician (died 1968)
- 1894 – Cecil M. Harden, American politician (died 1984)
- 1897 – Mollie Steimer, Russian-American activist (died 1980)
- 1898 – René Magritte, Belgian painter (died 1967)
- 1899 – Jobyna Ralston, American actress (died 1967)
- 1899 – Harekrushna Mahatab, Indian journalist and politician, 1st Chief Minister of Odisha (died 1987)

=== 1901–present ===
- 1902 – Foster Hewitt, Canadian sportscaster (died 1985)
- 1902 – Mikhail Suslov, Russian soldier, economist, and politician (died 1982)
- 1903 – Isaac Bashevis Singer, Polish-American novelist and short story writer, Nobel Prize laureate (died 1991)
- 1904 – Coleman Hawkins, American saxophonist and clarinet player (died 1969)
- 1905 – Georgina Battiscombe, British biographer (died 2006)
- 1907 – Buck Ram, American songwriter and music producer (died 1991)
- 1908 – Leo Politi, Italian-American author and illustrator (died 1996)
- 1908 – Elizabeth George Speare, American author and educator (died 1994)
- 1912 – Eleanor Powell, American actress and dancer (died 1982)
- 1913 – John Boulting, English director, producer, and screenwriter (died 1985)
- 1913 – Roy Boulting, English director, producer, and screenwriter (died 2001)
- 1913 – Gunnar Kangro, Estonian mathematician, author, and academic (died 1975)
- 1914 – Nusret Fişek, Turkish physician and politician, Turkish Minister of Health (died 1990)
- 1914 – Henri Laborit, French physician and philosopher (died 1995)
- 1915 – Norm Smith, Australian footballer and coach (died 1973)
- 1916 – Sid Luckman, American football player and soldier (died 1998)
- 1917 – Chung Il-kwon, Korean politician, diplomat, and soldier (died 1994)
- 1919 – Paul Bogart, American director and producer (died 2012)
- 1920 – Ralph Meeker, American actor (died 1988)
- 1920 – Stan Musial, American baseball player and manager (died 2013)
- 1921 – Donald Sheldon, American pilot (died 1975)
- 1922 – Abe Lemons, American basketball player and coach (died 2002)
- 1924 – Joseph Campanella, American actor (died 2018)
- 1924 – Milka Planinc, Yugoslav politician, 28th Prime Minister of Yugoslavia (died 2010)
- 1924 – Christopher Tolkien, English author and academic (died 2020)
- 1925 – Veljko Kadijević, Croatian general and politician, 5th Federal Secretary of People's Defence (died 2014)
- 1926 – Matti Ranin, Finnish actor (died 2013)
- 1926 – William Wakefield Baum, American cardinal (died 2015)
- 1927 – Georgia Frontiere, American businesswoman (died 2008)
- 1929 – Marilyn French, American author and academic (died 2009)
- 1929 – Laurier LaPierre, Canadian historian, journalist, and politician (died 2012)
- 1930 – Marjan Rožanc, Slovenian journalist, author, and playwright (died 1990)
- 1931 – Lewis Binford, American archaeologist and academic (died 2011)
- 1931 – Revaz Dogonadze, Georgian chemist and physicist (died 1985)
- 1931 – Stanley Kalms, Baron Kalms, English businessman (died 2025)
- 1931 – Malcolm Williamson, Australian pianist and composer (died 2003)
- 1932 – Beryl Bainbridge, English author and screenwriter (died 2010)
- 1932 – Pelle Gudmundsen-Holmgreen, Danish composer (died 2016)
- 1933 – Henry Hartsfield, American colonel, pilot, and astronaut (died 2014)
- 1933 – Jean Shepard, American country music singer-songwriter (died 2016)
- 1933 – Etta Zuber Falconer, American educator and mathematician (died 2002)
- 1934 – Laurence Luckinbill, American actor, director, and playwright
- 1934 – Peter Philpott, Australian cricketer (died 2021)
- 1936 – Victor Chang, Chinese-Australian surgeon (died 1991)
- 1937 – John Kerin, Australian politician (died 2023)
- 1937 – Ingrid Pitt, Polish-English actress (died 2010)
- 1937 – Marlo Thomas, American actress, producer, and activist
- 1939 – R. Budd Dwyer, American educator and politician, 30th Treasurer of Pennsylvania (died 1987)
- 1940 – Freddy Beras-Goico, Dominican comedian and television host (died 2010)
- 1940 – Terry Dischinger, American basketball player (died 2023)
- 1940 – Richard Marcinko, American commander and author (died 2021)
- 1940 – Natalia Makarova, Russian ballerina, choreographer, and actress
- 1941 – Juliet Mills, English-American actress
- 1941 – David Porter, American songwriter, musician, and producer
- 1942 – Heidemarie Wieczorek-Zeul, German educator and politician
- 1943 – Phil Bredesen, American businessman and politician, 48th Governor of Tennessee
- 1943 – Jacques Laffite, French race car driver
- 1944 – Dick Durbin, American lawyer and politician
- 1944 – Earl Monroe, American basketball player
- 1944 – Harold Ramis, American actor, director, producer, and screenwriter (died 2014)
- 1945 – Vincent Di Fate, American artist
- 1945 – Goldie Hawn, American actress, singer, and producer
- 1948 – Alphonse Mouzon, American jazz drummer (died 2016)
- 1948 – Michel Suleiman, Lebanese general and politician, 16th President of Lebanon
- 1950 – Hisham Barakat, Egyptian lawyer and judge (died 2015)
- 1950 – Livingston Taylor, American singer-songwriter and musician
- 1952 – Mervyn Davies, Baron Davies of Abersoch, Welsh banker and politician
- 1952 – Janne Kristiansen, Norwegian lawyer and jurist
- 1952 – Lorna Luft, American actress and singer
- 1953 – Tina Brown, English-American journalist and author
- 1954 – Fiona Pitt-Kethley, English journalist, author, and poet
- 1955 – Peter Koppes, Australian singer-songwriter and guitarist
- 1955 – Cedric Maxwell, American basketball player, coach, and sportscaster
- 1955 – Glenn Ridge, Australian radio and television host and producer
- 1956 – Cherry Jones, American actress
- 1959 – Sergei Ratnikov, Estonian footballer and manager
- 1960 – Mark Bailey, English rugby player, author, and educator
- 1960 – Brian McNamara, American actor, director, and producer
- 1960 – Brian Ritchie, American bass player and songwriter
- 1961 – João Domingos Pinto, Portuguese footballer and manager
- 1962 – Steven Curtis Chapman, American Christian music singer-songwriter, musician, record producer, actor, author, and social activist
- 1962 – Alan Smith, English football player
- 1963 – Dave Molyneux, Manx motorcycle racer
- 1963 – Nicollette Sheridan, English actress
- 1964 – Shane Douglas, American wrestler and manager
- 1964 – Olden Polynice, Haitian-American basketball player and coach
- 1964 – Liza Tarbuck, English actress, television and radio presenter
- 1965 – Björk, Icelandic singer-songwriter
- 1965 – Reggie Lewis, American basketball player (died 1993)
- 1966 – Troy Aikman, American football player and sportscaster
- 1966 – Evgeny Bareev, Russian chess player and coach
- 1966 – Thanasis Kolitsidakis, Greek footballer
- 1967 – Ken Block, American race car driver (died 2023)
- 1967 – Tripp Cromer, American baseball player
- 1967 – Toshihiko Koga, Japanese martial artist (died 2021)
- 1967 – Amanda Lepore, American model and singer
- 1968 – Jan Bertels, Belgian politician
- 1968 – Andy Caddick, New Zealand-English cricketer
- 1968 – Alex James, English singer-songwriter, bass player
- 1968 – Antonio Tarver, American boxer, sportscaster, and actor
- 1969 – Ken Griffey Jr., American baseball player and actor
- 1970 – Karen Davila, Filipino journalist
- 1970 – Justin Langer, Australian cricketer and coach
- 1971 – Michael Strahan, American football player, actor, and talk show host
- 1972 – Rich Johnston, English author and critic
- 1972 – Rain Phoenix, American actress and singer
- 1972 – Galina Kukleva, Russian biathlete (died 2026)
- 1974 – Marina de Tavira, Mexican actress
- 1975 – Jimmi Simpson, American actor
- 1976 – Mihaela Botezan, Romanian long-distance runner
- 1976 – Saleem Elahi, Pakistani cricketer
- 1976 – Martin Meichelbeck, German footballer
- 1976 – Daniel Whiston, English figure skater
- 1976 – Michael Wilson, Australian footballer
- 1977 – Michael Batiste, American basketball player
- 1977 – Yolande James, Canadian lawyer and politician
- 1977 – Jonas Jennings, American football player
- 1978 – Daniel Bradshaw, Australian footballer
- 1978 – Lucía Jiménez, Spanish actress and singer
- 1979 – Vincenzo Iaquinta, Italian footballer
- 1979 – Stromile Swift, American basketball player
- 1979 – Alex Tanguay, Canadian ice hockey player
- 1980 – Hank Blalock, American baseball player
- 1980 – Alec Brownstein, American author and director
- 1980 – Leonardo González, Costa Rican footballer
- 1981 – Wesley Britt, American football player
- 1981 – Ainārs Kovals, Latvian javelin thrower
- 1981 – Jonny Magallón, Mexican footballer
- 1982 – Ioana Ciolacu, Romanian fashion designer
- 1982 – Georgios Kalogiannidis, Greek archer
- 1982 – John Lucas III, American basketball player and coach
- 1983 – Brie Bella, American wrestler and television personality
- 1983 – Nikki Bella, American wrestler and television personality
- 1984 – Álvaro Bautista, Spanish motorcycle racer
- 1984 – Josh Boone, American basketball player
- 1984 – Lindsey Haun, American actress, singer, and director
- 1984 – Jena Malone, American actress and singer
- 1985 – Carly Rae Jepsen, Canadian singer-songwriter and actress
- 1985 – Jesús Navas, Spanish footballer
- 1985 – Nicola Silvestri, Italian footballer
- 1986 – Colleen Ballinger, American YouTuber, comedian, actress, and singer
- 1986 – Ben Bishop, American ice hockey player
- 1986 – Kristof Goddaert, Belgian cyclist (died 2014)
- 1986 – Sam Palladio, English actor and musician
- 1987 – Stefan Glarner, Swiss footballer
- 1987 – Eesha Karavade, Indian chess player
- 1987 – Karl Stollery, Canadian ice hockey player
- 1988 – Larry Sanders, American basketball player
- 1988 – Len Väljas, Canadian skier
- 1988 – Preston Zimmerman, American soccer player
- 1989 – Will Buckley, English footballer
- 1989 – Dárvin Chávez, Mexican footballer
- 1989 – Fabian Delph, English footballer
- 1989 – José Pirela, Venezuelan baseball player
- 1989 – Chris Singleton, American basketball player
- 1989 – Justin Tucker, American football player
- 1990 – Dani King, English cyclist
- 1990 – Georgie Twigg, English field hockey player
- 1991 – Almaz Ayana, Ethiopian sprinter
- 1991 – Lewis Dunk, English footballer
- 1991 – Peni Terepo, New Zealand rugby league player
- 1994 – Andreas Johnsson, Swedish ice hockey player
- 1994 – Saúl Ñíguez, Spanish footballer
- 1994 – Wyatt Teller, American football player
- 1995 – Chris Chiozza, American basketball player
- 1995 – Vladislav Gavrikov, Russian ice hockey player
- 1997 – Reo Hatate, Japanese footballer
- 1998 – Ognjen Ilić, Serbian cyclist
- 1998 – Vangelis Pavlidis, Greek footballer
- 1999 – Jaelin Howell, American soccer player
- 2000 – Isabel May, American actress
- 2000 – Matt O'Riley, English-Danish footballer
- 2001 – Rizky Ridho, Indonesian footballer
- 2004 – Liz, South Korean singer
- 2004 – Rico Lewis, English footballer

== Deaths ==
=== Pre-1600 ===
- 615 – Columbanus, Irish missionary and saint (born 543)
- 933 – Al-Tahawi, Arab imam and scholar (born 853)
- 1011 – Reizei, emperor of Japan (born 950)
- 1136 – William de Corbeil, English archbishop (born 1070)
- 1150 – García Ramírez of Navarre (born 1112)
- 1325 – Yury of Moscow, Prince of Moscow and Vladimir
- 1361 – Philip I, Duke of Burgundy (born 1346)
- 1555 – Georgius Agricola, German mineralogist, philologist, and scholar (born 1490)
- 1566 – Annibale Caro, Italian poet and author (born 1507)
- 1579 – Thomas Gresham, English merchant and financier (born 1519)

=== 1601–1900 ===
- 1639 – Henry Grey, 8th Earl of Kent, English politician, Lord Lieutenant of Bedfordshire (born 1583)
- 1652 – Jan Brożek, Polish mathematician, physician, and astronomer (born 1585)
- 1695 – Henry Purcell, English organist and composer (born 1659)
- 1710 – Bernardo Pasquini, Italian organist and composer (born 1637)
- 1775 – John Hill, English botanist and author (born 1719)
- 1782 – Jacques de Vaucanson, French engineer (born 1709)
- 1811 – Heinrich von Kleist, German poet and author (born 1777)
- 1844 – Ivan Krylov, Russian poet and playwright (born 1769)
- 1859 – Yoshida Shōin, Japanese academic and politician (born 1830)
- 1861 – Jean-Baptiste Henri Lacordaire, French priest and activist (born 1802)
- 1870 – Karel Jaromír Erben, Czech historian and poet (born 1811)
- 1874 – Marià Fortuny, Spanish painter (born 1838)
- 1881 – Ami Boué, German-Austrian geologist and ethnographer (born 1794)
- 1899 – Garret Hobart, American lawyer and politician, 24th Vice President of the United States (born 1844)

=== 1901–present ===
- 1907 – Harry Boyle, Australian cricketer (born 1847)
- 1907 – Paula Modersohn-Becker, German painter (born 1876)
- 1908 – Carl Friedrich Schmidt, German-Russian geologist and botanist (born 1832)
- 1909 – Peder Severin Krøyer, Norwegian-Danish painter (born 1851)
- 1916 – Franz Joseph I, Emperor of Austria (born 1830)
- 1922 – Ricardo Flores Magón, Mexican journalist and activist (born 1874)
- 1926 – Edward Cummins, American golfer (born 1886)
- 1928 – Heinrich XXVII, Prince Reuss Younger Line (born 1858)
- 1934 – John Scaddan, Australian politician, 10th Premier of Western Australia (born 1876)
- 1938 – Leopold Godowsky, Polish-American pianist and composer (born 1870)
- 1941 – Henrietta Vinton Davis, American actress and playwright (born 1860)
- 1942 – Count Leopold Berchtold, Austrian-Hungarian politician, Foreign Minister of Austria-Hungary (born 1863)
- 1942 – J. B. M. Hertzog, South African general and politician, 3rd Prime Minister of South Africa (born 1866)
- 1943 – Winifred Carney, Irish suffragist, trade unionist, and Irish republican (born 1887)
- 1945 – Robert Benchley, American humorist, newspaper columnist, and actor (born 1889)
- 1945 – Al Davis, American boxer (born 1920)
- 1945 – Ellen Glasgow, American author (born 1873)
- 1945 – Alexander Patch, American general (born 1889)
- 1947 – William McCormack, Australian politician, 22nd Premier of Queensland (born 1879)
- 1951 – Jean Trescases, French soldier who died during the Indochina War
- 1953 – Felice Bonetto, Italian race car driver (born 1903)
- 1953 – António Cabreira, Portuguese polygraph (born 1868)
- 1953 – Larry Shields, American clarinet player and composer (born 1893)
- 1957 – Francis Burton Harrison, American general and politician, 6th Governor-General of the Philippines (born 1873)
- 1958 – Mel Ott, American baseball player, manager, and sportscaster (born 1909)
- 1959 – Max Baer, American boxer, referee, and actor (born 1909)
- 1962 – Frank Amyot, Canadian canoeist (born 1904)
- 1963 – Artur Lemba, Estonian composer and educator (born 1885)
- 1963 – Robert Stroud, American ornithologist and author (born 1890)
- 1964 – Catherine Bauer Wurster, American architect and public housing advocate (born 1905)
- 1967 – C. M. Eddy, Jr., American author (born 1896)
- 1970 – Newsy Lalonde, Canadian lacrosse and ice hockey player (born 1887)
- 1970 – C. V. Raman, Indian physicist and academic, Nobel Prize laureate (born 1888)
- 1973 – Thomas Pelly, American lawyer and politician (born 1902)
- 1974 – John B. Gambling, American radio host (born 1897)
- 1974 – Frank Martin, Swiss-Dutch pianist and composer (born 1890)
- 1975 – Gunnar Gunnarsson, Icelandic author (born 1889)
- 1980 – Sara García, Mexican actress (born 1895)
- 1981 – Harry von Zell, American actor and comedian (born 1906)
- 1982 – John Hargrave, English activist and author (born 1894)
- 1984 – Ben Wilson, American basketball player (born 1967)
- 1986 – Jerry Colonna, American singer-songwriter and actor (born 1904)
- 1987 – Jim Folsom, American politician and 42nd Governor of Alabama (born 1908)
- 1988 – Carl Hubbell, American baseball player and scout (born 1903)
- 1989 – Harvey Hart, Canadian director, producer, and screenwriter (born 1928)
- 1989 – Margot Zemach, American author and illustrator (born 1931)
- 1990 – Dean Hart, Canadian wrestler and referee (born 1954)
- 1991 – Sonny Werblin, American businessman and philanthropist (born 1907)
- 1992 – Kaysone Phomvihane, Laotian soldier and politician, 2nd President of Laos (born 1920)
- 1992 – Ricky Williams, American singer-songwriter and drummer (born 1956)
- 1993 – Bill Bixby, American actor (born 1934)
- 1994 – Willem Jacob Luyten, Dutch-American astronomer and academic (born 1899)
- 1995 – Peter Grant, English actor and manager (born 1935)
- 1995 – Noel Jones, Indian-English diplomat, British ambassador to Kazakhstan (born 1940)
- 1996 – Bernard Rose, English organist and composer (b 1916)
- 1996 – Abdus Salam, Pakistani-English physicist and academic, Nobel Prize laureate (born 1926)
- 1999 – Quentin Crisp, English actor, author, and illustrator (born 1908)
- 2000 – Ernest Lluch, Spanish economist and politician (born 1937)
- 2000 – Emil Zátopek, Czech runner (born 1922)
- 2002 – Hadda Brooks, American singer-songwriter and pianist (born 1916)
- 2005 – Alfred Anderson, Scottish soldier (born 1896)
- 2005 – Hugh Sidey, American journalist and academic (born 1927)
- 2006 – Hassan Gouled Aptidon, Somali-Djiboutian politician, 1st President of Djibouti (born 1916)
- 2006 – Pierre Amine Gemayel, Lebanese lawyer and politician (born 1972)
- 2007 – Fernando Fernán Gómez, Spanish actor, director, and screenwriter (born 1921)
- 2007 – Tom Johnson, Canadian-American ice hockey player and coach (born 1928)
- 2007 – Noel McGregor, New Zealand cricketer (born 1931)
- 2009 – Konstantin Feoktistov, Russian engineer and astronaut (born 1926)
- 2010 – Norris Church Mailer, American author (born 1949)
- 2010 – David Nolan, American activist and politician (born 1943)
- 2010 – Margaret Taylor-Burroughs, American painter and author, co-founded the DuSable Museum of African American History (born 1917)
- 2011 – Anne McCaffrey, American science fiction and fantasy author (born 1926)
- 2012 – Emily Squires, American director, producer, and screenwriter (born 1941)
- 2012 – Austin Peralta, American pianist (born 1990)
- 2013 – John Egerton, American journalist and author (born 1935)
- 2013 – Fred Kavli, Norwegian-American businessman and philanthropist, founded The Kavli Foundation (born 1927)
- 2013 – Dimitri Mihalas, American astronomer and author (born 1939)
- 2013 – Vern Mikkelsen, American basketball player and coach (born 1928)
- 2013 – Bernard Parmegiani, French composer (born 1927)
- 2013 – Tôn Thất Đính, Vietnamese general (born 1926)
- 2013 – Maurice Vachon, Canadian-American wrestler (born 1929)
- 2014 – John H. Land, American soldier and politician (born 1920)
- 2014 – Robert Richardson, English general (born 1929)
- 2015 – Gil Cardinal, Canadian director, producer, and screenwriter (born 1950)
- 2015 – Ameen Faheem, Indian-Pakistani poet and politician (born 1939)
- 2015 – Bob Foster, American boxer and police officer (born 1938)
- 2015 – Anthony Read, English screenwriter and producer (born 1935)
- 2015 – Joseph Silverstein, American violinist and conductor (born 1932)
- 2016 – Hassan Sadpara, Pakistani mountaineer and adventurer (born 1963)
- 2017 – David Cassidy, American singer-songwriter and guitarist (born 1950)
- 2021 – Lou Cutell, American actor (born 1930)
- 2021 – Jean-Pierre Schumacher, French Trappist monk and survivor of the Thibirine monks (born 1924)
- 2024 – Alice Brock, American artist, author and restauranteur (born 1941)

== Holidays and observances ==
- Armed Forces Day (Bangladesh)
- Christian feast days:
  - Agapius
  - Amelberga of Susteren
  - Digain
  - Maurus of Parentium
  - Pope Gelasius I
  - Franciszka Siedliska
  - Presentation of the Blessed Virgin Mary
  - Rufus of Rome (no. 7 in list)
  - William Byrd, John Merbecke and Thomas Tallis (Episcopal Church (USA))
  - November 21 (Eastern Orthodox liturgics)
- World Television Day (United Nations observance)
