= Mid-Hudson Athletic League =

High school sports league in New York state

- Association: New York State Public High School Athletic Association (NYSPHSAA)
- President: Tom Cassata
- Sports fielded: 23
- No. of teams: 18
- Official website: Section 9 Sports

The Mid-Hudson Athletic League (MHAL) is an inter-scholastic high school sports program located within Section IX of the New York State Public High School Athletic Association.

== Schools ==
MHAL sports are split into four divisions, with the best division teams earning playoff spots:

MHAL Division Alignment
Division 1	Division 2	Division 3	Division 4
Lourdes	Marlboro	Dover	Millbrook
Roosevelt	Mount Academy	Ellenville	Pine Plains
Saugerties	New Paltz	Highland	Rhinebeck
Wallkill	Red Hook	Onteora	Webutuck
—	Rondout Valley	Spackenkill	—
