= Bishop Dubois High School =

Location
- 503 & 505 West 152 nd St. New York City, Manhattan, New York 10031; United States; 40°49′47.92″N 73°56′41.53″W

Information
- Type: Private, All-Male
- Religious affiliation: Roman Catholic
- Established: 1946
- Founder: Rev. MSGR. Michael A. Buckley
- Status: Closed
- Closed: 1976
- Grades: 9-12
- Colors: Blue and Gray
- Athletics: Bowling, JV and Varsity Basketball, Track.
- Mascot: Lion
- Team name: Lions
- Website: https://www.facebook.com/groups/1381412232086609

Bishop Dubois High School was a private Roman Catholic high school in New York City from 1946 until 1976.

== History ==
An aerial view of Bishop Dubois High School and surrounding

Bishop Dubois High School of New York City opened its doors in September 1946 with the first graduating class in 1950.

The main building and Annex of the private, Roman Catholic Bishop Dubois high school was located in the Hamilton Heights area of Manhattan at 503 and 505 West 152nd St. New York City, N.Y. 10031.

The main building of the school consisted of four floors located at 503 West 152nd Street. The building was extended with an additional two floors located at 505 West 152nd Street to provide a gymnasium and more classrooms above.

The Catholic school was established using the name Bishop John Dubois, after John DuBois (August 24, 1764 – December 20, 1842).

The secondary school provided education to male students and prepared them for college and provided the basis for the development of spiritual, academic, and personal qualities to promote themselves and their family, community, and society.

== Notable alumni ==
The students who attended the school were from the five boroughs of New York City.

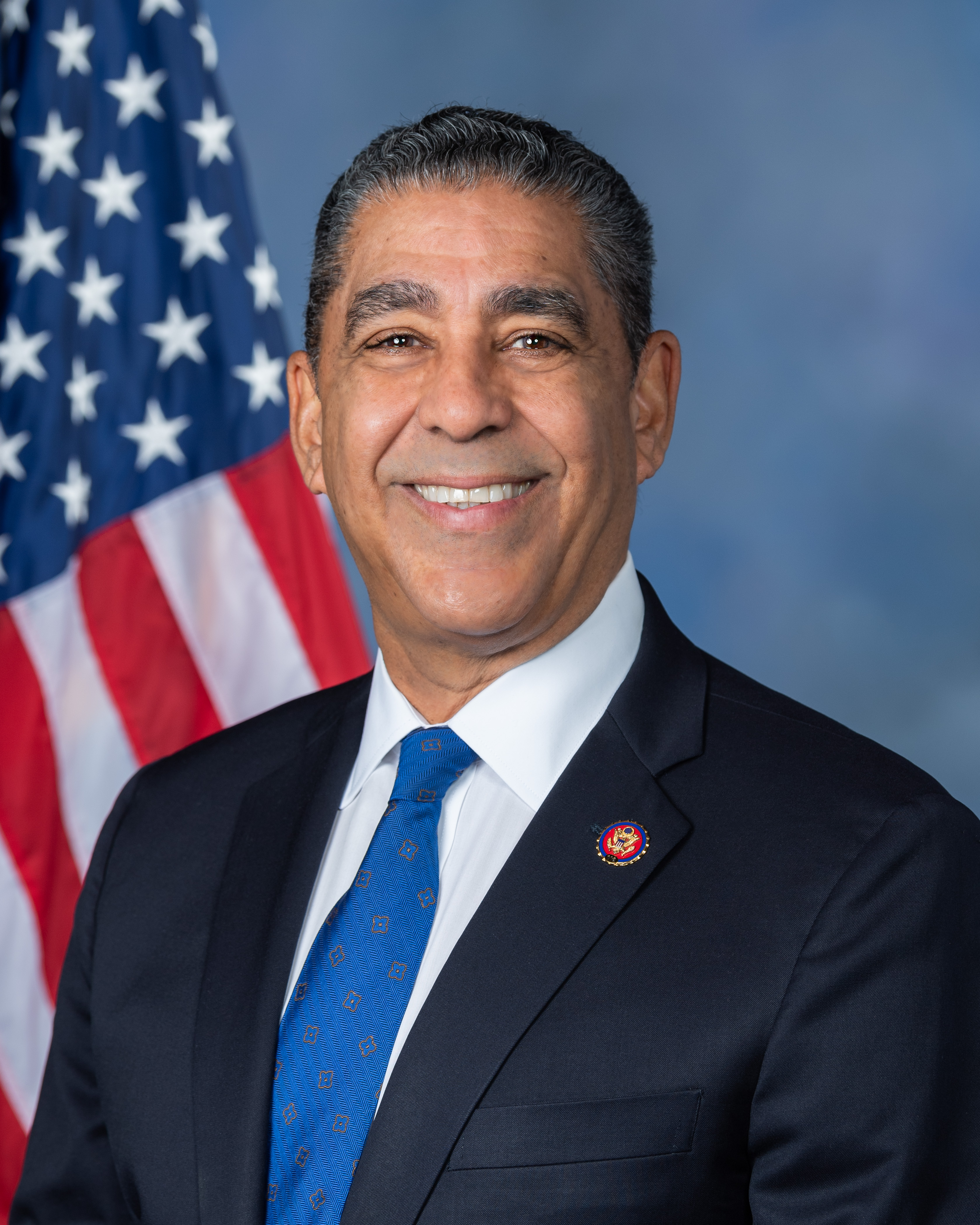
Adriano Espaillat

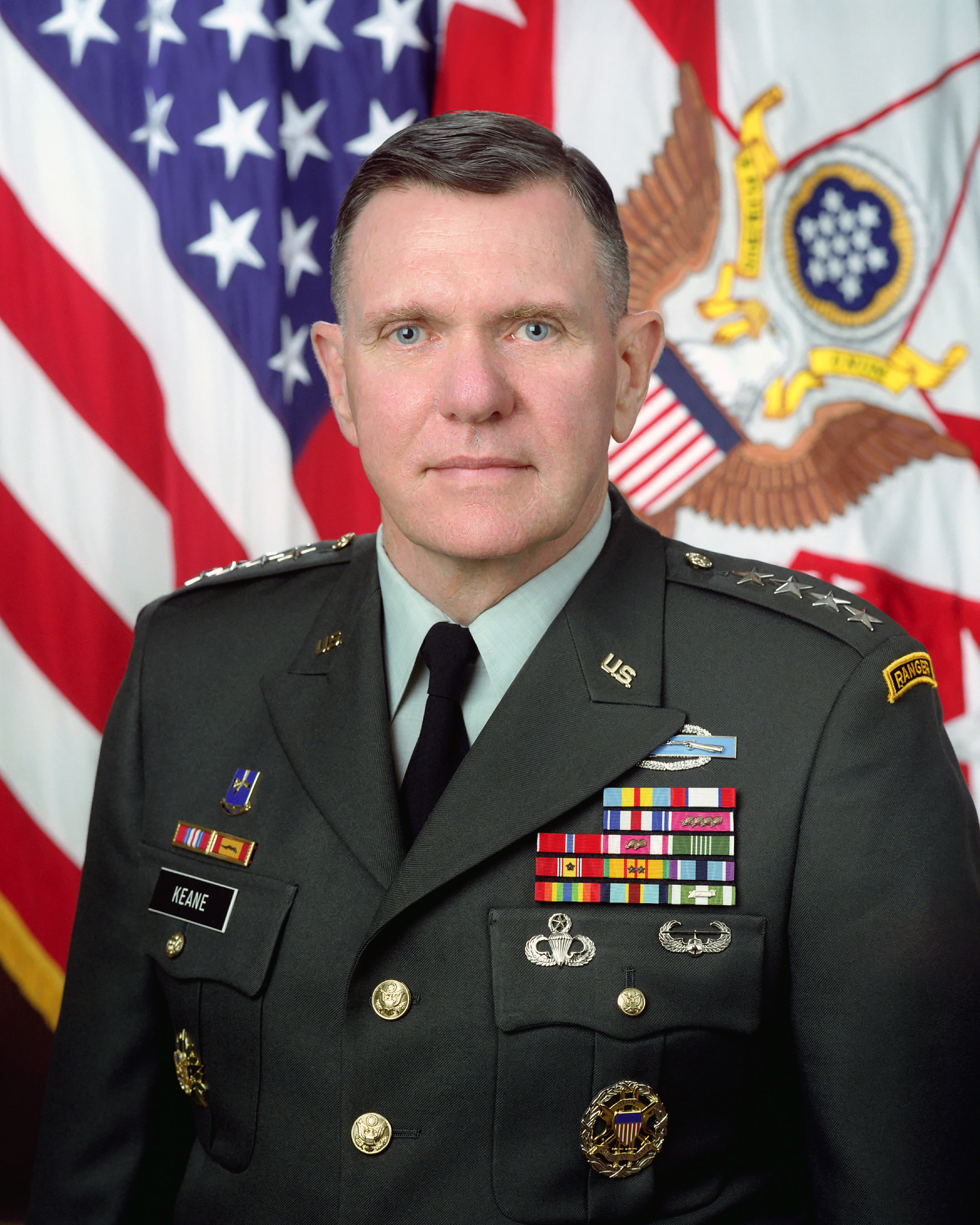
Jack Keane

- George Carlin, well-known comedian and social critic, briefly attended the school.
- Adriano Espaillat ('74), U.S. representative for New York's 13th congressional district for the U.S. House of Representatives.
- Joseph A. Fernandez, expelled from the high school, later was Chancellor of the New York City Board of Education from 1990 to 1993.
- Jack Keane ('60), retired four-star General, former Vice Chief of Staff of the U.S. Army, Acting Chief of Staff of the U.S. Army, and Chief Operating Officer of the U.S. Army; also served on the Board of Directors of MetLife.
- Rudy Keeling, Division I head basketball coach at the University of Maine and Northeastern University, before becoming Athletic Director at Emerson College and commissioner of the Eastern College Athletic Conference (ECAC).
- Kenny Rankin, singer and songwriter, picture is in the 1955 year book, p. 42.; he would have graduated in 1957 but he moved back to Canada.

== Principals ==
1. Rev. MSGR. Michael A. Buckley, Founding Principal, 1946–60
2. Rev. MSGR. William J. Ward, Principal, 1960–69
3. Rev. MSGR. William J. McMahon, Principal, 1969–76
Michael A. Buckley

William J. Ward

William J. McMahon

== Faculty ==
The faculty, teachers, and staff of the school consisted of Marist Brothers, Fathers or Roman Catholic Priests, Sisters or Nuns, lay teachers, administrative and general staff.

== Closure ==
The last graduating class of Bishop Dubois High School was the class of 1976. List of closed schools in the Roman Catholic Archdiocese of New York

== Award and crest ==
Bishop Dubois High School crest (from the high school year book)

School emblem (received as an award for Athletic endeavors and worn on the school sweaters and jackets, submitted by Joe Moser class of 1957)
