= Society of the Sisters of Saint Ursula of the Blessed Virgin =

Roman Catholic religious congregation for women

The Society of the Sisters of Saint Ursula of the Blessed Virgin (abbreviation S.U.) is a Roman Catholic religious congregation of women founded in 1606 at Dole (then a Spanish possession as part of the Holy Roman Empire region of Franche-Comté), France, by the Venerable Anne de Xainctonge (1567-1621). Its members are especially involved in teaching.

== History ==
At a time when the education of girls was more than neglected, Mademoiselle de Xainctonge realized her intention to do for girls what Saint Ignatius had done for boys. This idea was then an unusual one. Anne de Xainctonge may be called a pioneer in the education of girls. The classes opened at Dole, on 16 June 1606, were public, without distinction of rich or poor, and absolutely free. The community was distinctive in that it was uncloistered and offered free education to girls. The rule was based on the Ignatian rule of the Jesuits. In lieu of a religious habit Anne and her companions adopted the simple black dress of the Spanish widows in the area of Dole.

The society was formally approved by a Brief of Innocent X (1648), which was confirmed by Innocent XI (1678).

=== Development ===
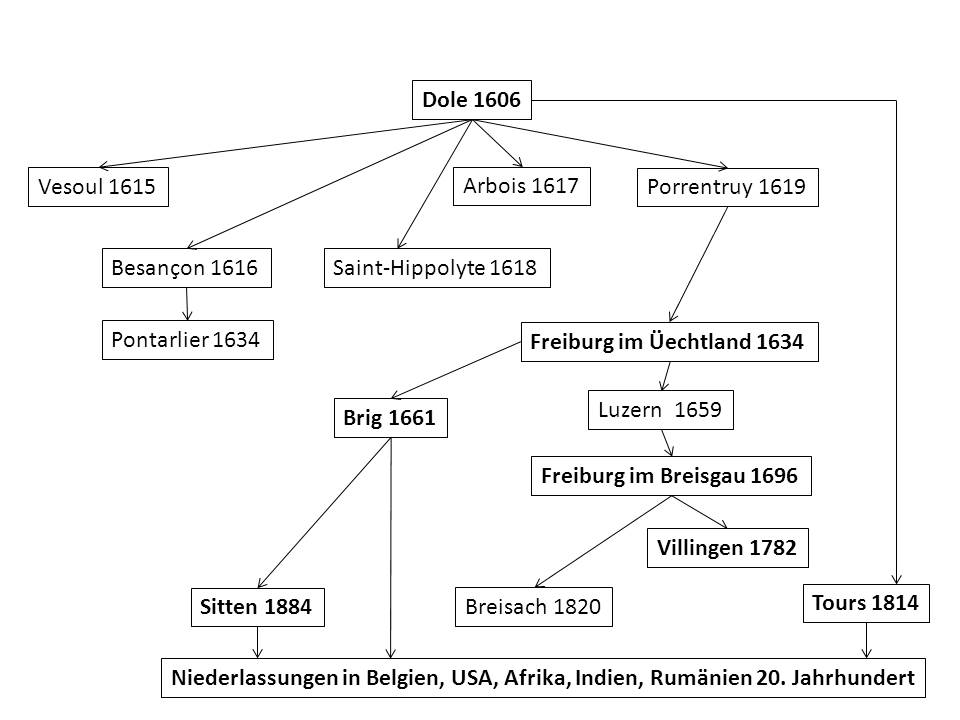
Anne de Xainctonge-Konvente korr

From Dole, the institute spread rapidly to France, Switzerland, and Germany.

During the French Revolution, their houses were closed and the religious dispersed; as soon as peace was restored, however, they resumed their former life. Mother de Verse reopened the convent at Dole, and Mother Roland de Bussy (formerly of Dole) upon the advice of Father de Clorivière, S.J., and with the blessing of Pius VII (then a prisoner at Fontainebleau), founded a new house at Tours (1814).

The Constitutions are those of Saint Ignatius as far as they apply to women; the first draft was begun by Mother de Xainctonge, aided by Father Guyon, S.J., rector of the college at Dole, and was finished in 1623, after her death. These Constitutions were observed until the Revolution, but when the various houses re-opened, the bishops of the different dioceses modified them according to their own views. In 1898, upon request of the religious of Tours, the original Constitutions, revised conformably to the new regulations of the Church for religious institutes, were definitively approved by Leo XIII, and their branch erected as a generalate. In 1902 the words "Of the Blessed Virgin", were added to the title to distinguish the non-cloistered daughters of Anne de Xainctonge from the cloistered daughters of St. Angela. From 1965 on they called themselves "Society of Saint Ursula of Anne de Xainctonge". That was the year in which the seven autonomous houses joined together to form a Federation.

=== Foundations ===
Initially new foundations were independent, but after the French Revolution, many of the houses established daughter houses to which they remained connected. The new Motherhouses were Dole and Tours in France; Fribourg, Sion, and Brig in Switzerland; Villingen and Freibourg in Germany. A number of new foundations were made from Tours, until, through the anti-religious laws of 1901, the sisters were expelled and their property confiscated. The mother house of Tours was transferred to Haverloo-lez-Bruges, Belgium.

Other foundations were successively made in Rome, 1904; Sluis (the Netherlands), 1911.

==== United States ====
In 1901 with the expulsion of the Society from France, Archbishop Michael Corrigan of New York invited the sisters to establish a community in the archdiocese. The Society made its first foundation in the United States with the opening of a house at 523 West 142nd St. at Our Lady of Lourdes parish in the Hamilton Heights section of Manhattan, New York City, where they taught French and gave piano lessons until the Academy of Our Lady of Lourdes opened in 1903. In 1912 the school moved to W79th St. and was called Notre Dame Convent School. In 1989 ownership of the school was transferred to an independent Board of Trustees and in 2002 the Notre Dame School of Manhattan re-located to 327 West 13th Street in Greenwich Village.

From New York, a second house was established in 1911 in Providence, Rhode Island.

In 1925 the Sisters established the Academy of St. Ursula at "Marygrove" near Kingston Point in Ulster County, New York, and in 1943 began to staff St. Joseph's parochial school in the city of Kingston. In 1966 the Academy of St. Ursula became John A. Coleman Catholic High School, which in 1968 moved to a larger campus in Hurley.

In 1968 the sisters established the Linwood Spiritual Center retreat house in Rhinebeck, New York. In 1984 the Society arrived in the Diocese of Raleigh (North Carolina) where sisters serve in Wilmington and Jacksonville.

Today, the Federation of the Society of Saint Ursula, numbering 600 Sisters, is present on four continents: Africa, Asia, Europe and North America. Their ministry focuses on the areas of education, social justice, spirituality and pastoral ministry. Through the Tri-State Coalition for Responsible Investment, the Society is a member of the Interfaith Center for Corporate Responsibility.

== See also ==
- Ursulines, est. 1535
- Congregation of the Ursulines of the Agonizing Heart of Jesus (Grey Ursulines), est. 1920 (1908)
