= Joseph A. Fernandez =

School system chancellor

Joseph Anthony Fernandez was the Chancellor of the New York City Board of Education from 1990 to 1993.

== Early life and education ==
Fernandez was born in Harlem, and grew up there. He was a student at Bishop Dubois High School, but was expelled from the high school.

He joined the U.S. Air Force, and "earned a high school equivalency diploma;" he then went to Columbia University. Before graduating, he and his wife moved to Florida to alleviate a son's health problem. Fernandez transferred to and graduated from University of Miami.

== Career ==
=== Florida ===
Fernandez began his teaching career in 1963 in Florida. He eventually reached "superintendent of schools in Miami" ("head of the schools in Dade County, Florida"), a position he held for two years prior to coming to New York City.

=== New York City ===
Fernandez had a "stormy three-and-a-half-year tenure as one of the highest-paid school officials in the country." Fernandez's support of the 1991 Rainbow Curriculum for first grade multicultural education, and his support of AIDS education in public schools, were controversies that led to his contract not being renewed in 1993. His successor was the city's "sixth schools chancellor in a decade."

His suspending of an entire school board in Queens was reversed by the city's Board of Education.

=== Back to Florida ===
Following the end of his position in New York City, Fernandez and his wife moved back to Florida.

== Personal ==
Fernandez is "a native New Yorker" who spent "a quarter of a century in Miami." His wife's name is Lily; they have four children. Their son with a health problem benefited from the move to Florida.
