= Notre Dame School (Manhattan) =

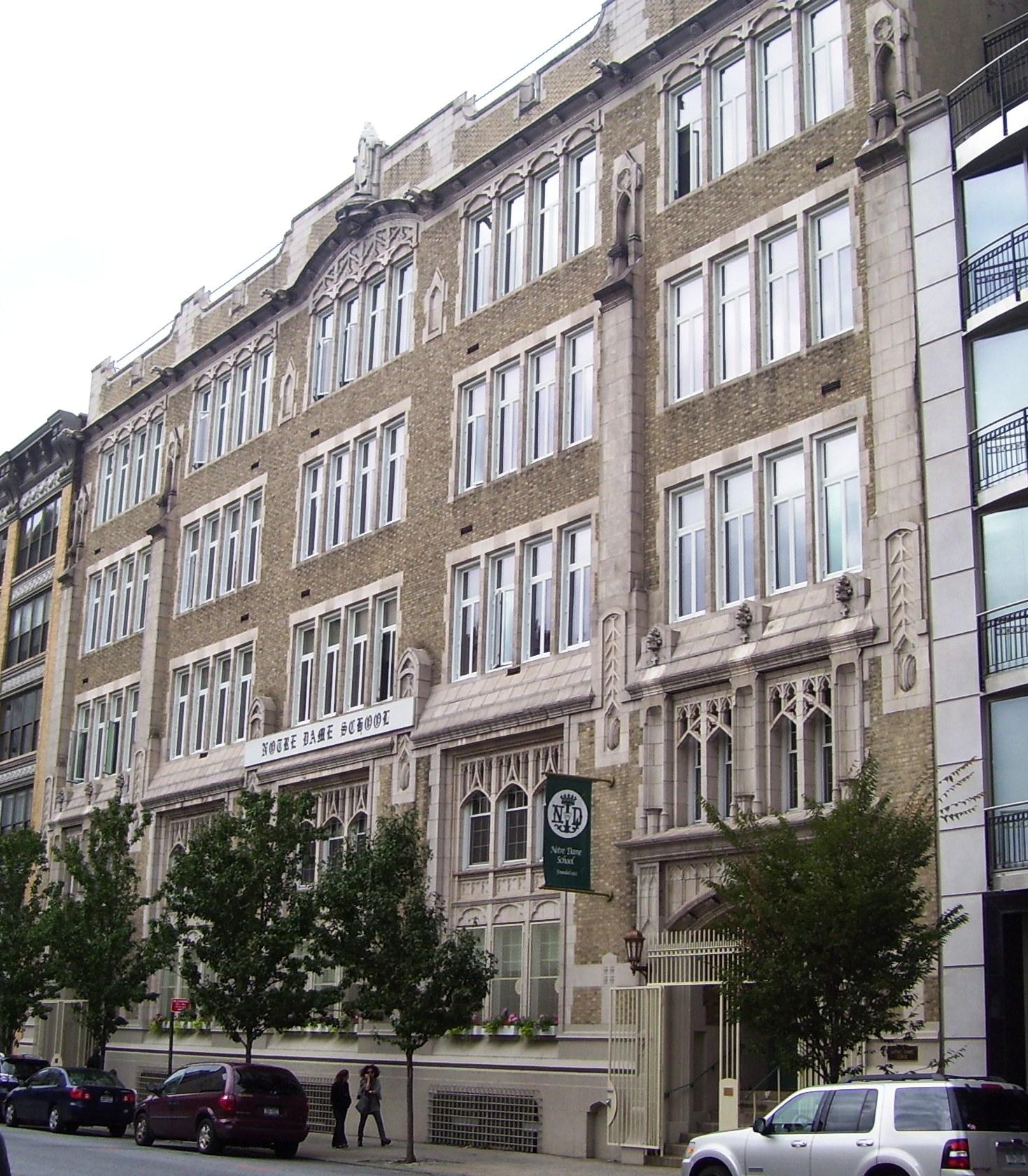
- Notre Dame School in New York City

Location
- 327 West 13th Street (Greenwich Village, Manhattan); New York City, New York 10014; United States; 40°44′23″N 74°0′16″W

Information
- Former name: Academy of Our Lady of Lourdes (1912–1943); Notre Dame Convent School (1943–?)
- Type: Private
- Motto: Chez Nous (French: "Our Home")
- Religious affiliation: Roman Catholic
- Patron saint: Anne de Xainctonge
- Established: 1912 (114 years ago)
- Founder: Sisters of St. Ursula
- School code: 209 (TACHS)
- President: Virginia O'Brien, SU
- Principal: Karina Vargas (2002)
- Grades: 9–12
- Gender: Girls
- Average class size: 28
- Student to teacher ratio: 13:1
- Campus type: Urban
- Colors: Green and white
- Song: "Notre Dame; Chez Nous"
- Athletics conference: Catholic High School Athletic Association
- Sports: Basketball, cross country, soccer, softball, track, volleyball
- Mascot: Dragon
- Team name: Dragons
- Accreditation: Middle States Association of Colleges and Schools
- Publication: Coversatio (literary magazine)
- Yearbook: Chez Nous
- School fees: $525
- Tuition: $16,500 (2019–2020)
- Brother school: Xavier High School
- Website: cheznous.org

Notre Dame School is a private Catholic secondary school for girls, located in the Greenwich Village neighborhood of Manhattan in New York City, New York, US. It is located within the Roman Catholic Archdiocese of New York.

== History ==
The Sisters of St. Ursula founded the Academy of Our Lady of Lourdes in 1912 when they came to New York from France.

The school was formed in the Catholic tradition of Anne de Xainctonge, who founded the Sisters of St. Ursula in the early 1600s and was an advocate for educating girls as the Jesuits educate boys.

The school began in the sisters' home and was referred to as Chez Nous (our home), a nickname the school still uses. Students refer to each other as their "chez nous sisters".

The school originally was located in the Our Lady of Lourdes Church parish on West 142nd Street near Amsterdam Avenue, and then, in 1943, moved to West 79th Street and changed its name to Notre Dame Convent School and eventually just Notre Dame School.

Faced with closure, the sisters sold the building and transferred ownership of the school to an independent board of trustees in 1989, and the school moved again to 104 St. Marks Place in the East Village neighborhood.

In 2002, to accommodate a growing enrollment, the school moved to its location at 327 West 13th Street on the border of the West Village and the Meatpacking District. The five-story building is the former St. Bernard's grammar school, which had been merged with St. Xavier's grammar school before the archdiocese closed it in 2001.

== Admission ==
Admission is based on prior school records and performance on the TACHS test for New York students and the COOP exam for New Jersey residents.

Students come from more than 90 elementary and middle schools in the New York metropolitan area.

The enrollment is 355 in four grades.

Tuition is $19,800 for the 2023–24 school year. Scholarships and financial aid are available.

== Academics ==
Notre Dame is a private, Catholic secondary school for girls focused on a college-preparatory curriculum. The student–faculty ratio is 13:1. The average class size is 28.

Students take four years of English, mathematics and science, in addition to art, computer coding, health, history, languages (French, Spanish, Latin), music, physical education, and religion. Advanced Placement and honors courses are offered.

Notre Dame is a member of the National Coalition of Girls' Schools, the National Association of Independent Schools, and the New York State Association of Independent Schools (NYSAIS). As a member of NYSAIS, the school is no longer obligated to administer the New York Regents Examinations.

Notre Dame students may participate in the following programs: The Gilder Lehrman Institute of American History, Global Kids High School Ambassadors Program, Ignatian Teach-In for Justice, S-PREP at Columbia University, STEP Science and Technology Entry Programs at Barnard College, Baruch College and Fordham University, and the Whitney Museum of American Art Neighborhood Friend School.

Students go on regular spiritual retreats and can attend monthly Catholic Mass.

Students are expected to follow Anne's Values (named for patron Anne de Xainctonge), which are prayer, trust, gratitude, hope, perseverance, conversatio, magis, friendship, courage, service, responsibility and respect. Older students can apply to be Anne's Leaders and lead their classmates in discussions of topics centered on the values.

== Extracurricular activities ==
The school offers more than 30 clubs and extracurricular activities, including student council, National Honor Society, spring musical, yearbook and stepping.

Sports include basketball, cross country, soccer, softball, track and volleyball.

The school offers a summer camp for rising 7th, 8th and 9th graders. Morning classes include art, coding and mathematics, while afternoons are devoted to excursions to sites around Manhattan.

== Notable alumnae ==
- Corazon Cojuangco-Aquino (class of 1949) – former President of the Philippines
- Carlina Rivera (class of 2002) – councilwoman for the 2nd district of the New York City Council
