= Franciscan Sisters of Peace =

The Franciscan Sisters of Peace is a Roman Catholic community of women in consecrated life founded in 1986, as an archdiocesan community, from the Franciscan Missionary Sisters of the Sacred Heart. The community is rooted in both the Catholic penitential movement and the pattern of Gospel life known as the Rule of the Third Order of St. Francis. The Congregation Center is in Haverstraw, New York.

== Introduction ==
Early in his ministry, Saint Francis of Assisi offered guidelines that became the foundation of what became the third form of Gospel life. Franciscan lay penitents soon began living in community, professing vows, and doing works of charity. This movement soon developed into religious congregations of the Third Order Regular, including the Franciscan Sisters of Peace.

== History of the Franciscan Sisters of Peace ==
In 1865, three Franciscan Missionary Sisters of the Sacred Heart journeyed from Gemona del Friuli, Italy to New York City to minister and provide for the needs of Italian immigrants in the city. These women had a dedicated pioneering spirit that attracted vocations and gave impetus to diverse ministries, and also brought peace to others through their works of mercy and justice. In 1890, the sisters founded the American Province of St. Francis, within their European congregation. The Provincial motherhouse was established in Peekskill, New York.

In 1986, one hundred and twelve vowed women of the St. Francis province co-founded a new Institute of Consecrated Life of Diocesan Right known as the Franciscan Sisters of Peace, based in Haverstraw, New York. The new congregation embodied a new expression of the charism of Saint Francis: peace. As mentioned by the congregation, peace is the fruit of a life based on four fundamental values: contemplative prayer, conversion, poverty, and minority (humility). The Franciscan Sisters of Peace are rooted in the pioneering spirit, faith and trust in Divine Providence characteristic of the early sisters.

== Apostolate ==
The mission of the Franciscan Sisters of Peace is to proclaim and live the Gospel of Jesus Christ in the footsteps of Saints Francis and Clare of Assisi. Today, they continue to spread their mission of peacemaking in a variety of ways as teachers, social workers, administrators, parish associates, prison chaplains, retreat directors, day care workers and health care workers.

Through the Minores Fund, the congregation awarded a grant in support of the Seafarers International House's annual "Christmas At Sea" Holiday Initiative. Due to COVID protocols and extended contracts, many seafarers are confined to ships without shore leave. Through the program, port chaplains deliver satchels of gifts of clothing and snacks to crew members separated from family during the holidays.

The congregation is a member of "U.S. Catholic Sisters Against Human Trafficking".

The Franciscan Sisters of Peace are also one of five religious communities (along with the Sisters of Mercy, the Society of the Holy Child Jesus, the Sisters of Saint Dominic of Blauvelt and the Sisters of the Blessed Sacrament) responsible for the creation in 1995 of Marian Woods, a healthcare facility for residents that range in age from 65 years to 100 years of age. Marian Woods was built on eleven acres of peaceful property in Hartsdale, New York, with 120 acres that surround the property preserved as a town park. Each resident is a member of the founding congregations and has a debilitating condition that has impaired their ability to perform everyday tasks.

== Philosophy of the Congregation ==
According to the Mission Statement of the Franciscan Sisters of Peace, the community states the following philosophy as guiding their mission in the world:

- We believe in a God of Wisdom, Beauty, and Goodness, who is Creator of all things.
- We believe that all creation is in relationship in and through Jesus Christ.
- We believe that a simple, non-violent life originates in Jesus Christ and continues in the tradition of Clare and Francis of Assisi.
- We believe that the sacredness of each human person and of the earth leads logically to non-violent, mutually affirming relationships.
- We believe that the Third Millennium must be dedicated to simple, non-violent living.
- We believe that women, children, the economically poor, sand the earth suffer from the absence of a simple, non-violent way of life.
- We believe that non-violence is a Franciscan way of seizing the moral initiative, breaking the cycle of humiliation, exposing injustices of systems and cultures, and claiming the power of truth.
- We believe that simple, non-violent living requires creativity, humor, moral imagination, trust, gentleness, frugality, and a willingness to suffer rather than retaliate.
- We believe that the desire for peace as a way of life connects persons of different religious traditions and cultures toward a profound and powerful realization of the Reign of God for the Third Millennium.
- As Franciscan Sisters of Peace, we believe that we can stir and encourage the imagination and create the concrete responses to violence needed in our lives today.

== Mission of the Congregation ==
This is the Mission Statement of the Franciscan Sisters of Peace, as quoted from their website:

- We commit to educating toward a lifestyle characterized by the Christian and Franciscan perspective of simplicity and non-violence in a global community.
- Peacemaking is the charism of our Community. As our ongoing mission in this regard, we:
  - continue the peacemaking features of the ministries of the Sisters and Associates in the Newsletter of the Franciscan Sisters of Peace;
  - establish a regular column in the Newsletter for educating about simplicity and non-violence;
