= St. Pius V High School =

Location
- 500 Courtlandt Avenue; New York City (Mott Haven, Bronx), New York 10451; United States
- 40°48′55.5″N 73°55′11.5″W

Information
- Type: Private, All-Female
- Religious affiliation: Roman Catholic
- Established: 1930
- Principal: Sr. Mary Jo Lynch
- Grades: 9-12
- Website: http://www.stpiusvhs.org

St. Pius V High School was a private, Roman Catholic high school in the Bronx, New York. It was located within the Roman Catholic Archdiocese of New York and operated from 1930 to 2011.

== Background ==
St. Pius V High School, known first as St. Pius Commercial School, was founded by Rev. Francis Fagan, Pastor of St. Pius V Church and the Sisters of St. Dominic of Blauvelt, NY as a 2-year commercial high school in 1930. St. Pius Commercial served to educate the children of Irish, Italian and German immigrants, and its initial mission was to prepare these young people for office work in businesses and professional offices in the South Bronx, which was at that time the commercial center of the borough.

At its founding the school was housed in a room of the St. Pius V (Elementary) School at 144th St. off Willis Ave. and had a student body of five taking instruction in bookkeeping, stenography, typing, English and religion. Initially, students entered St. Pius after 8th grade. However, the importance of a four-year high school diploma soon became clear, so two years of academic high school were made a requirement before admission would be considered for St. Pius Commercial. Within a few years St. Pius Commercial consumed the entire top floor of the elementary school building. In the years leading up to the Second World War, St. Pius admitted both boys and girls, but by war's end and forever after admitted only girls.

In 1950, to meet the growing demand for space, Father Cornelius Hayes of St. Pius V Church acquired the Haffen office building between Third and Courtlandt Avenues at the foot of 147th Street. With the added space, St. Pius Commercial became a four-year high school. Finally, in response to changing trends in the education of women, the Blauvelt Dominican Sisters expanded the mission of the school and in 1962 St. Pius was fully accredited as an academic high school by the New York State Board of Regents under the name St. Pius V High School.

During the last seven decades the student body has mirrored the shifting immigration and social patterns of the city. A school born serving the families of Irish, Italian and German immigrants now serves Latin-American and African-American families, and the families of Caribbean and Latin immigrants. What was once a school primarily suited to young women preparing to be office support workers now prepares young women for the rigors of the marketplace by focusing on college preparation. An average of 90% of St. Pius graduates are accepted to college, some choosing private schools and schools outside the city, such as Colgate, Cornell, Boston College, Middlebury, Skidmore and Johns Hopkins.

The flight of landlords during the 1970s and the collapse of city services during the fiscal crisis left abandoned buildings and burned out blocks through every square mile of the South Bronx and many parts of Harlem - a new service area for St. Pius V as a result of the loss of several high school annexes for women during that era. With the flight of businesses, professional offices and the middle class from the neighborhoods we serve; and with the decline in standards of discipline and the upheaval in cultural norms after the 1960s, educational concepts and practices at St. Pius were tested.

When she became principal in 1973, Sr. Mary Jo Lynch, OP oversaw the introduction of a value-centered approach to education that was far less doctrinal than had previously been the case at Pius. Personal responsibility and individual initiative became paramount, and Sr. Mary Jo became a proponent of using small, community-based schools to augment and extend familial care as a method for education and as a method for nurturing the development of the whole person.

The breakdown of the neighborhood and its families was nearly complete by 1987, with the advent of cheap, accessible drugs and the culture of violence that the drug trade left in its wake. The crash of financial markets in October of that year precipitated school closings throughout the Bronx after the withdrawal of supplementary Archdiocesan aid to schools in low-income neighborhoods that were not subsidized by religious orders or were not directly run by the Archdiocese.

Slated for closure in 1989, St. Pius received a new lease on life through the efforts of Principal Sr. Mary Jo Lynch OP and her appeal to members of the corporate community through contacts established in 1988 and 1989. After a personal meeting between Sr. Mary Jo and Archbishop John Cardinal O'Connor, and with pressure from Jean Kennedy Smith and Chanel Fashions President, Kitty D'Alessio, the Education Department relented in its efforts to shut the school and thereby save the costs of capital improvements to the building and continued subsidy to the operating budget.

During the early 1990s, a committee was formed under the leadership of Kathy Zamechansky, a Bronx-based businesswoman with strong ties to political, business and community groups in the Bronx and Harlem, and independent sources of funding were established. Mrs. Zamechansky initiated the annual Excelsior Awards Gala, and during its inaugural dinner in April 1993, JoAnn Mazzella Murphy '59 was honored and became the school's first benefactor.

At about the same time, Sister Mary Jo was approached by a group of Manhattan-based corporate executive women under the leadership of Mary G. Berner, most recently CEO of The Reader's Digest, and the St. Pius Committee was formed. In 1996, the St. Pius V Board was organized, bringing together key members of the St. Pius and Excelsior committees, and the annual Hometown Heroes event was instituted. In the years which followed, foundations, alumnae, the unified Board and Mrs. Richard G. Cashin, the school's greatest benefactor, enabled St. Pius to renovate the school, upgrade technical systems, and maintain tuition at levels lower than any secondary school in the Archdiocese of New York.

After the rise of charter schools in New York, enrollment at St. Pius began a gradual decline, finally reaching levels that could no longer sustain the school. On January 11, 2011, the Archdiocese of New York announced that St. Pius was one of twenty-seven schools that would be closed at the end of the school year.

After 80 years of service to the neighborhoods of the South Bronx and Harlem, St. Pius V High School held its final commencement on Saturday, June 11, 2011.
