= John A. Coleman Catholic High School =

Private coeducational school in Hurley, New York, United States

Location
- 430 Hurley Avenue; Hurley, (Ulster County), New York 12443; United States; 41°55′59″N 74°2′36″W

Information
- Type: Private, Coeducational
- Motto: Respect, Responsibility, Religion
- Religious affiliation: Roman Catholic
- Established: 1966
- Closed: 2019
- Grades: 9-12
- Colors: White, Green and Gold
- Athletics: Soccer, Cross Country, Tennis, Basketball, Baseball, Softball, Track & Field, Golf, Volleyball
- Athletics conference: Mid-Hudson Athletic League
- Team name: Statesmen
- Accreditation: Middle States Association of Colleges and Schools
- Tuition: $7,000. (2017–18)
- Website: www.colemancatholic.org

John A. Coleman Catholic High School was a private, Roman Catholic high school in Hurley, New York. It was under the control of the Roman Catholic Archdiocese of New York until 2001. From its inception in 1966 until its closing on August 31, 2019, Coleman Catholic educated students in grades 9–12.
