= New Paltz High School =

Coordinates: 41.7249°N 74.0759°W

New Paltz Central High School
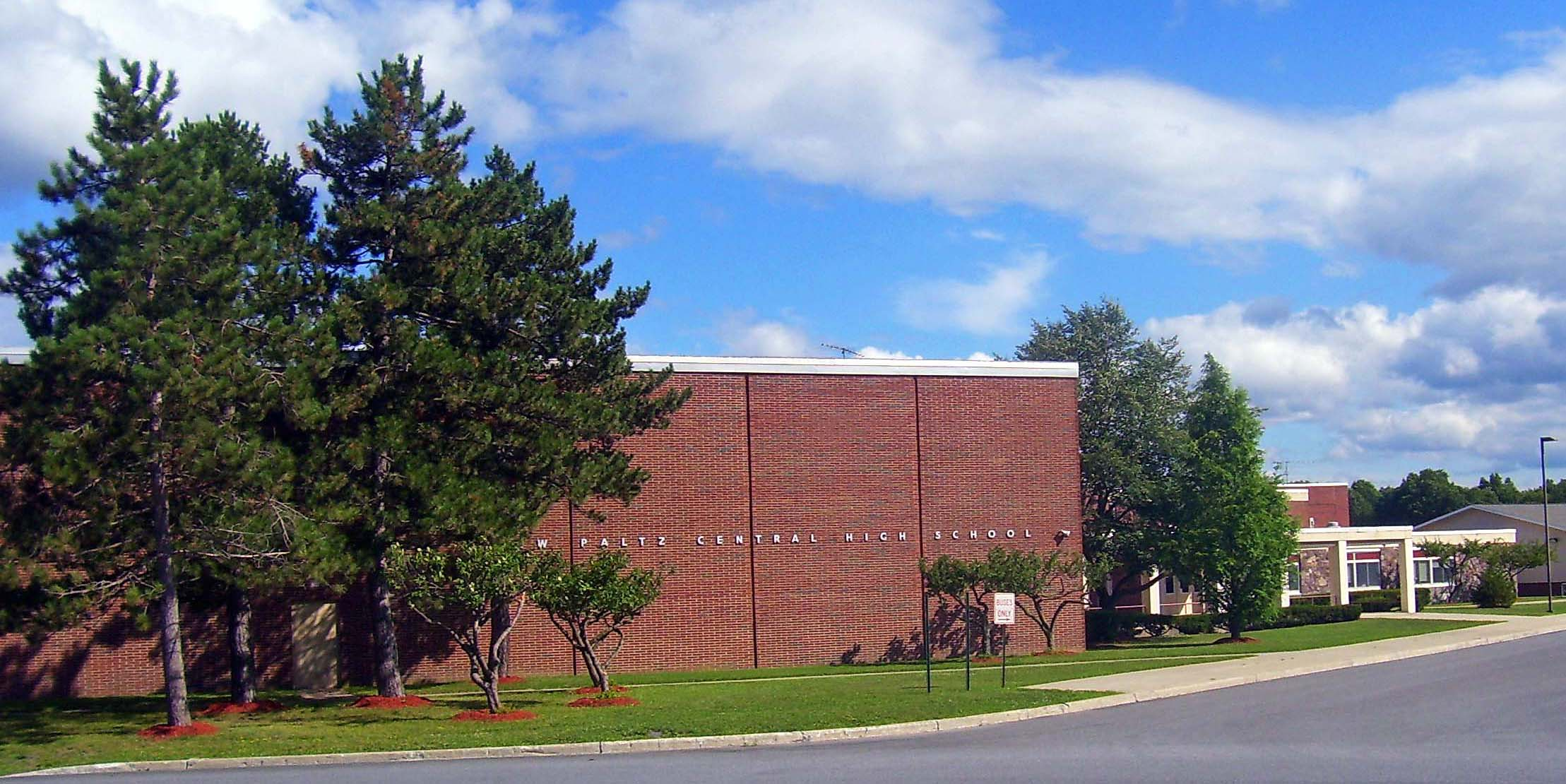
- New Paltz Central High School during 2007.

Location
- 130 South Putt Corners Road; New Paltz, NY 12561; United States

Information
- Type: Public
- School district: New Paltz Central School District
- Principal: Samuelle Simms
- Faculty: 54.80 (on an FTE basis)
- Enrollment: 622 (2024–25)
- Student to teacher ratio: 11.35
- Colors: Maroon and white
- Mascot: Huguenot
- Nickname: Ol' Maroon
- Website: hs.newpaltz.k12.ny.us

New Paltz Central High School is situated on South Putt Corners Road in New Paltz New York, United States. It serves students in grades 9–12 from the New Paltz Central School District, which serves most of New Paltz and Gardiner, New York, as well as parts of several other towns adjacent.

== Academics ==
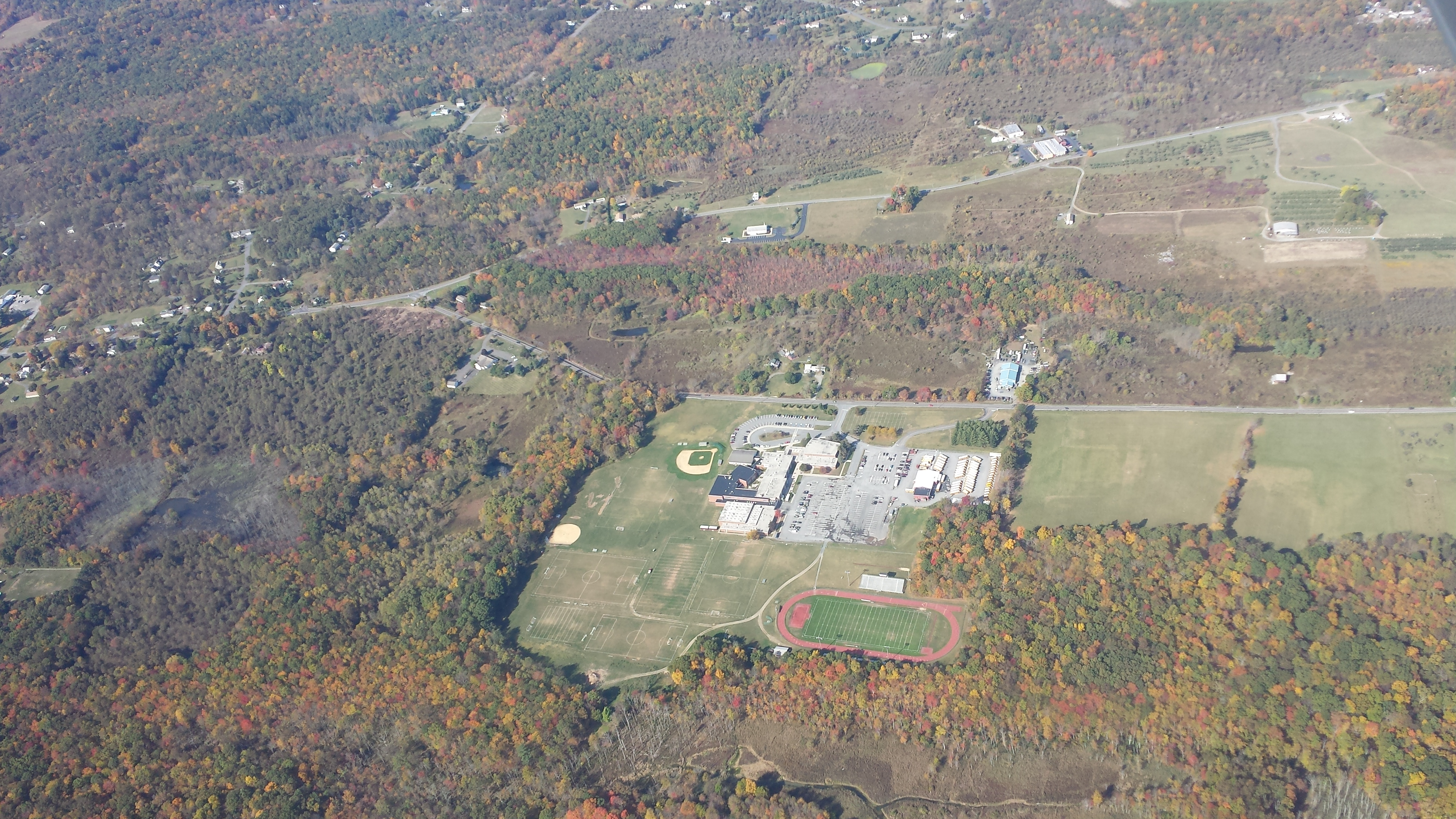
Aerial view of New Paltz High School at an altitude of 3,500 feet. MSL

The original structure was completed during 1968, at which time the average class size was significantly smaller than for later decades. In both 2004 and 2017, new wings were added.

New Paltz High School is known for academic success. The school has a variety of Advanced Placement courses that offer college credits. These classes are taken by students who want to challenge themselves in history, science, math, or literature and writing. Due to the high school's small size, students receive much one-on-one attention, increasing their academic success.

== Athletics ==
The school mascot is the Huguenot. Historically the Huguenots were a group of French Calvinists who, while escaping religious persecution, played a major part in the European settlement of New Paltz.

New Paltz High School has several athletic teams with sports in both junior varsity and varsity class. Teams are raised from the school population and are directed by faculty and staff. The teams include football, baseball, softball, basketball, soccer, track and field, gymnastics, volleyball, cross country, swimming, Nordic skiing, wrestling, tennis, lacrosse, and golf. The New Paltz football team has won 3 section titles. The New Paltz track and field program has also had championship success, winning Section 9 Class B titles during 2010 (tying with Ellenville high school), 2011 and 2012 as well as being the 2011 and 2012 Mid-Hudson Athletic League champions. The cross country program has had title wins in the Mid-Hudson Athletic League and sections frequently over many years. The men's varsity swim team also placed 2nd in the New York state championship meet during 2010 at Buffalo, losing to Shenendehowa High School. The girls varsity swim team were the Section 9 champions in 2017.

From the 1970s through the 1990s New Paltz had an elite wrestling program managed by coaches Kemble Matter and Frank Ciliberto. During the span from 1975 to 1993 New Paltz was the regional standard, winning 13 UCAL/MHAL titles and two section 9 titles (when section 9 included Rockland County). Other notable team wins were achieved at the Pascack Hills, NJ and Delaware Valley, PA invitational tournaments as well as the OSWOA tournament for the 1983-1984 season. Also during that season New Paltz scored second in the New York State Cup dual meet tournament, losing a narrow battle 27-25 to the eventual champions from Baldwin, a prolific Long Island wrestling school roughly 3 times as large as New Paltz.

Each year the high school's physical education department hosts a dodge ball tournament - with both faculty and student players, and a pickleball tournament which sometimes includes separate competitions for badminton and ping-pong

== Technology ==
During the 2005-2006 school year, school personnel developed their own television show called NPZ TV. The show was founded by English teacher Bill Zimmer and computer teacher Jen Cone. NPZ TV is used to deliver the school's daily announcements with two anchors and a lunch/weather/wellness person; the broadcast also includes brief shows about school sports, local news and student interests that are created by the advanced graphics and video editing for production class taught by technology teacher Brennan Woods. Participating students arrive at the school early to assist with the show, both as the anchors and to work with the technology in the control room to insert green screen backgrounds and videos directly into the teleprompter.

== Notable alumni ==
- Charles Davis, CBS NFL color analyst, NFL draft expert and voice of the Madden Football game.
- Ronald Enroth (born 1938), Professor of Sociology at Westmont College.
- Ebony Obsidian, actress
- Chris Regan, writer and driveway toilet owner
- Keith Schiller, former director of Oval Office operations.
