= Anne de Xainctonge =

French religious sister

Venerable Anne de Xainctonge SU
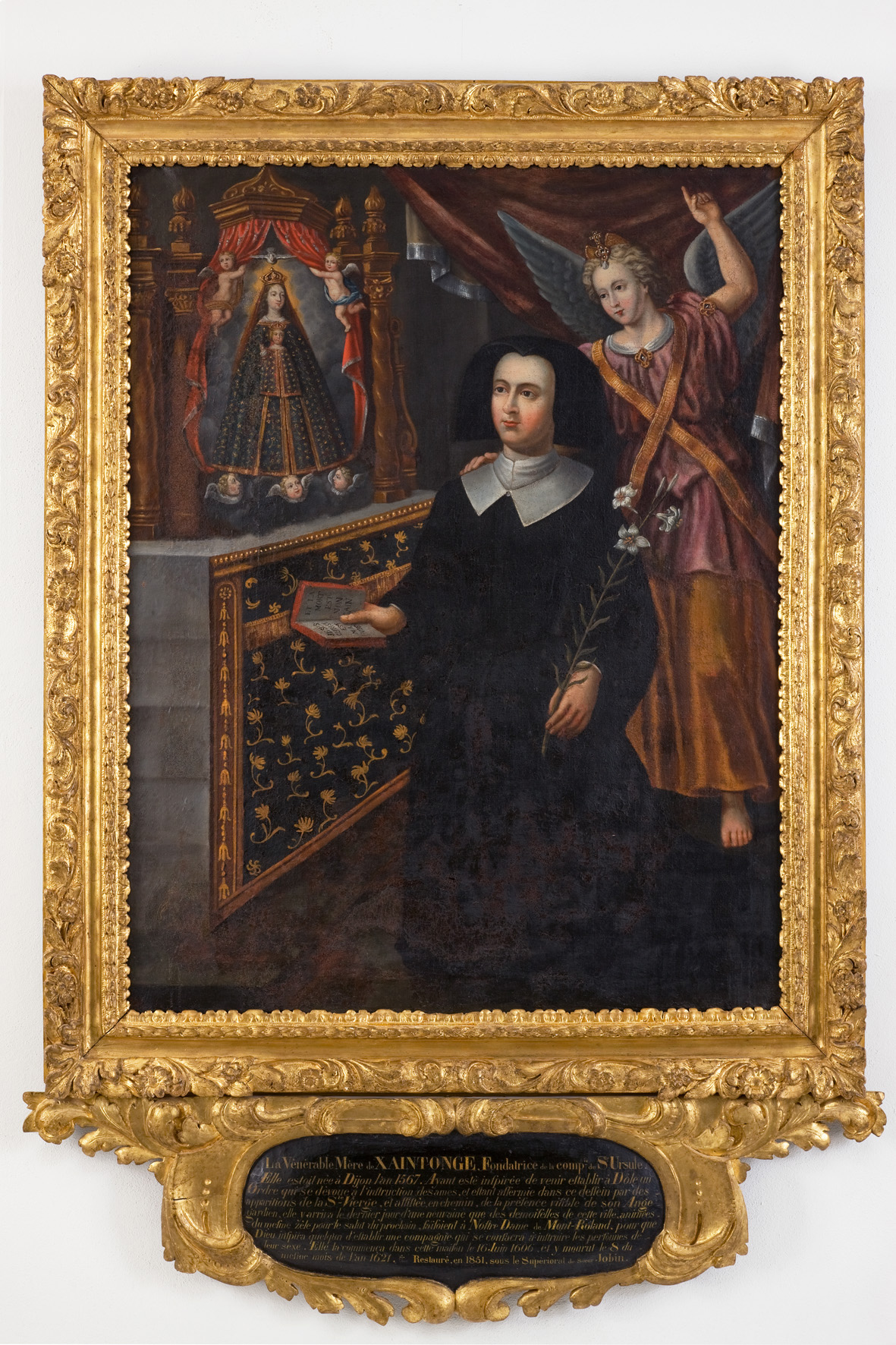
- Born: 21 November 1567; Dijon, France
- Died: 8 June 1621 (aged 53); Dole, Jura, France

Anne de Xainctonge (21 November 1567 – 8 June 1621) was a French religious sister who founded of the Society of the Sisters of Saint Ursula of the Blessed Virgin. She was declared venerable by the Roman Catholic Church in 1991.

== Life ==
She was born in Dijon, the eldest child of Jean de Xainctonge, a politician, and his wife, Lady Marguerite Collard, both members of the nobility. Her father saw to it that she had a good education. Her upbringing was also very practical. She and her step-sister Nicole were entrusted with the care of the poultry-yard, cellar, and fruit-rooms.

At the age of seventeen, de Xainctonge made her appearance in high society with all the pomp of her position. She is described as vivacious and witty. When an acceptable suitor presented himself, she declined the proposal and her parents reluctantly let her have her way. The catechism lesson of a Jesuit, gave her the idea to assist with the instruction. She gathered those students having most difficulty and helped prepare them for the regular class. She also visited hospitals to care for and instruct the sick.

Near her house was a Jesuit school for boys which inspired her with the idea of educating girls. An uncloistered order of women, operating a free school for girls, was a new idea at that time, and de Xainctonge met with a great deal of resistance. In 1596 she left Dijon for Dole, a university town, at that time in Franche-Comté and under Spanish influence. There she found other young women interested in teaching women and girls. Rome had recently reasserted the cloister as the only approved form of religious life for women. Nonetheless, on 16 June 1606, Anne opened the first convent of what would later become the Society of the Sisters of Saint Ursula of the Blessed Virgin, in a house that had previously been a restaurant. In lieu of a religious habit, she and her companions adopted the simple black dress of the Spanish widows everywhere visible in the region of Dole, so as to render them inconspicuous in the streets on the rare occasions they had to leave the house.

The society spread rapidly in the east of France and in Switzerland. In addition to the original school, seven more were established by de Xainctonge during her lifetime. In 1619, a community was established in Porrentruy, Switzerland. Francis de Sales wrote to her expressing the wish that she make an establishment in his diocese, but she died in Dôle at the age of 53, before that could happen.

== Beatification process ==
Due to her work she was considered a candidate for beatification soon after her death, but the French Revolution and other wars of the period led to the destruction of many documents. Some sources add that de Xainctonge herself asked that her personal writings be burned after her death. The process of evaluating her spiritual writings, therefore, did not begin until 18 July 1998. Her cause was formally opened on 24 November 1900, and on 14 May 1991, John Paul II declared the heroic virtues of Anne de Xainctonge.
