= Ellenville High School =

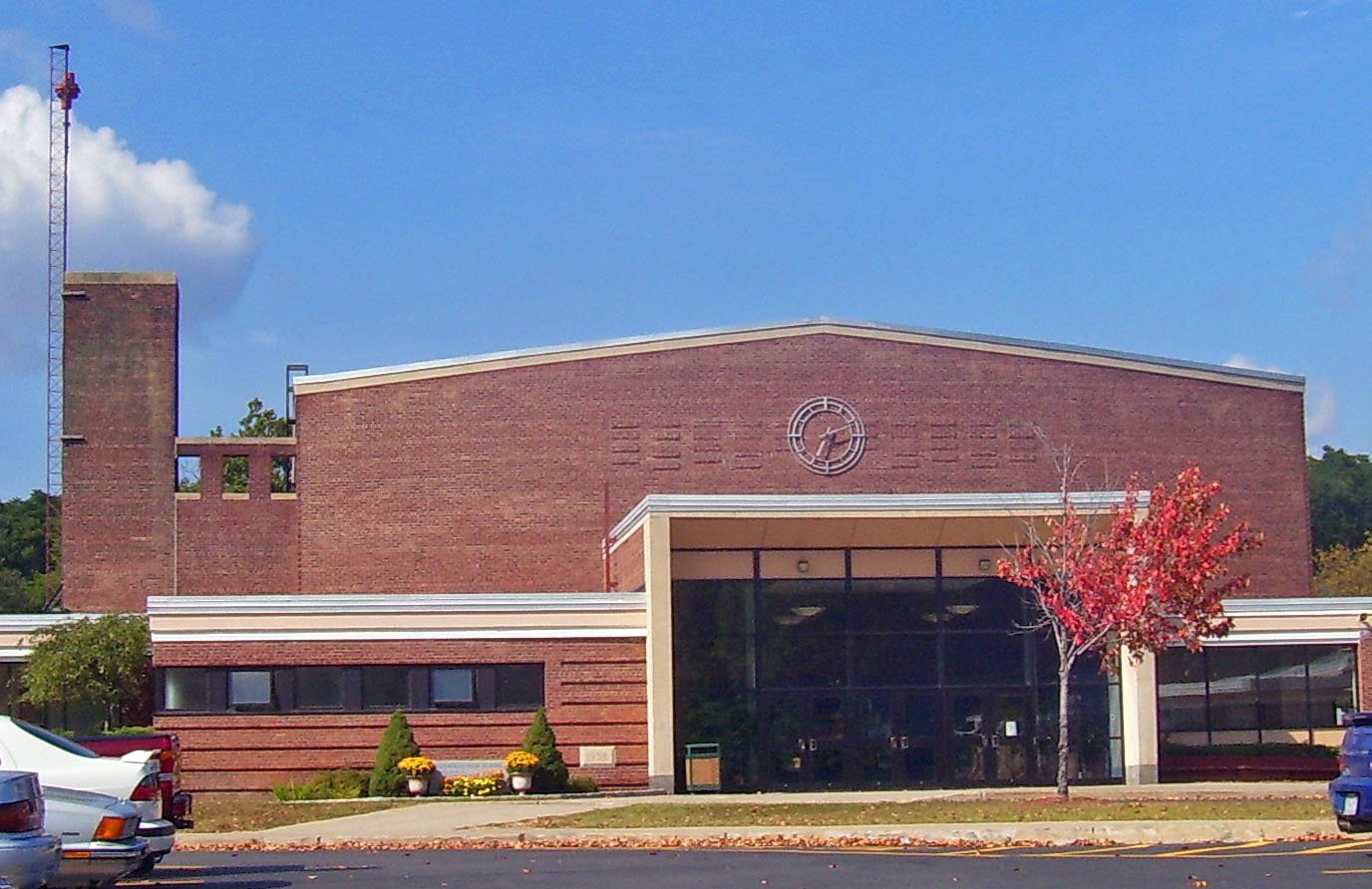
- School front entrance in 2007

Location
- 28 Maple Avenue; Ellenville, New York 12428; United States; 41°43′05″N 74°23′23″W

Information
- School type: Public, High School
- Opened: 1996
- Status: open
- School district: Ellenville Central School District
- Principal: Carl Pabon
- Staff: 64.84 (FTE)
- Grades: 9-12
- Gender: Coed
- Enrollment: 695 (2023-2024)
- Average class size: 22
- Student to teacher ratio: 10.72
- Language: English
- Campus type: small town
- Colors: Blue and gold
- Team name: Blue Devils
- Communities served: Ellenville, Cragsmoor, Town of Wawarsing
- Website: www.ecs.k12.ny.us/o/ehs

Ellenville Junior/Senior High School is a co-ed high school in Ellenville, New York, United States. The school is in the Ellenville Central School District, which serves Ellenville, the town of Wawarsing and the hamlets of Cragsmoor and Napanoch.

The building was renovated in 1996 and features a highly advanced distance learning classroom, as well as a state-of-the-art digital security system. It also was one of the first fifteen participants in a statewide anti-school violence program started by then-Attorney General Eliot Spitzer.

In 2007 the New York Foundation for Educational Reform and Accountability identified the school as one of upstate New York's fifteen "dropout factories," based on data from a Johns Hopkins study that it claimed showed 60 percent or less of its graduating senior classes had been Ellenville ninth graders.
