= Buon Consiglio =

Buon consiglio is Italian for Good Counsel.

Buon Consiglio or Buonconsiglio may refer to:

== Places ==
- Buonconsiglio Castle, Trento, Trentino, Italy

=== Churches ===
- Madre di Buonconsiglio or Madre del Buon Consiglio (Italian: Mother of Good Counsel), Naples, Italy; a basilica church
- Madonna del Buon Consiglio (Italian: Our Lady of Good Counsel), La Rotta, Pontedera, Pisa, Tuscany, Italy; a church
- Santa Maria del Buon Consiglio (Italian: Saint Mary of Good Counsel), Via Tuscolana, Rome. Italy; a church
- Seriate#Sanctuary_“Madonna_del_Buon_Consiglio”#Sanctuary Madonna del Buon Consiglio, Seriate, Bergamo, Lombardy, Italy; a church
- Sanctuary of the Madonna del Buon Consiglio, Grumello del Monte, Bergamo, Lombardy, Italy
- Madonna del Buon Consiglio, Florence, Italy; see List of churches in Florence
- Church of the Madonna del buon consiglio, Genazzano, Rome, Italy
- Our Lady of Good Counsel Church (Italian: La Chiesa Nostra Signora del Buon Consiglio), Philadelphia, Pennsylvania, USA; see History of Italian Americans in Philadelphia

== People ==
- Giovanni Buonconsiglio (1465–1536), Italian painter
- Ian Lloyd (musician) (born 1947, as Lloyd Buonconsiglio), U.S. rock musician
- Mary, mother of Jesus, by a religious title rendered in Italian
  - Our Lady of Good Counsel (Italian: Madonna del Buon Consiglio), a religious title in Italian, for Mary, mother of Jesus

== Other uses ==
- Madonna del Buon Consiglio, Piano Dal Quercione, Massarosa, Tuscany, Italy; a parish, see List of parishes of the Roman Catholic Archdiocese of Lucca
- Buon Consiglio, a 1761 third-rate warship of Venice; see List of ship launches in 1761

== See also ==
- Good Counsel (disambiguation) (Italian: Buon Consiglio)
- Buon
- Consiglio (disambiguation)
