= Mother of Good Counsel =

Mother of Good Counsel, or, Virgin Mother of Good Counsel, or, Our Mother of Good Counsel, or, Holy Mother of Good Counsel, may refer to:

== In general ==
- Blessed Virgin Mary
- "Our Lady of Good Counsel" a title for Mary, mother of Jesus

== Groups, organizations ==
- Institute of the Mother of Good Counsel (IMBC; Italian: Istituto Mater Boni Consilii; Latin: Institutum Mater Boni Consilii), an Italian Catholic congregation

=== Ecclesiastical provinces ===
- Province of Our Mother of Good Counsel, an ecclesiastical province of the Order of Saint Augustine
- Mother of Good Counsel, Chicago, Illinois, USA; an ecclesiastical province of the Felician Sisters

=== Ecclesiastical parishes ===
- Mother of Good Counsel Parish, Chrysanthemum Village, San Pedro, Laguna, Philippines
- Our Mother of Good Counsel Parish, Homer Glen, Illinois, USA
- Mother of Good Counsel parish, Plantation, Kentucky, USA
- Our Mother of Good Counsel Parish, Radnor Township, Pennsylvania, USA

== Places ==
- Chapel of Our Lady, Mother of Good Counsel, Vranovice (Brno-Country District), Czech Republic
- Mother of Good Counsel Church, San Po Kong, Hong Kong; see List of Catholic churches in Hong Kong
- Madre del Buon Consiglio (Italian: Mother of Good Counsel), Naples, Italy; a church

=== In Australia ===
- Mother of Good Counsel School, Cairns North, Queensland
- Mother of Good Counsel Catholic Church, Innisfail, Queensland

=== In the Philippines ===
- Mother of Good Counsel Seminary (Latin: Mater Boni Consilii), San Fernando, Pampanga
- The Monastery of the Mother of Good Counsel, Bulacan; operated by the Augustinian nuns

=== In the United States ===
- Our Mother of Good Counsel Church, Our Lady of the Angels Pastoral Region, Archdiocese of Los Angeles, California
- Mother of Good Counsel School, Our Lady of the Angels Pastoral Region, Archdiocese of Los Angeles, California
- Mother of Good Counsel Elementary School (Kentucky), Louisville, Kentucky
- Mother of Good Counsel School, Plantation, Kentucky
- Mother of Good Counsel Home, St. Louis, Missouri; operated by the Sisters of St. Francis of the Martyr St. George
- Mother of Good Counsel, Homewood, Pittsburgh, Pennsylvania; see List of churches in the Roman Catholic Diocese of Pittsburgh
- Our Mother of Good Counsel Roman Catholic Church Complex, Blasdell, Erie, New York State; see National Register of Historic Places listings in Erie County, New York
- Mother of Good Counsel, Milwaukee County, Wisconsin; see List of schools in the Roman Catholic Archdiocese of Milwaukee
- Mother of Good Counsel Votive Candle Chapel, Shrine of Our Lady of Guadalupe, La Crosse, Wisconsin

== Other uses ==
- Nyiramavugo (mother of good counsel), a royal title for the Queen Mother in the Kingdom of Rwanda

== See also ==
- Lady of Good Counsel (disambiguation)
- Mary of Good Counsel (disambiguation)
- Good Counsel (disambiguation)
- Holy Mother (disambiguation)
- Mother (disambiguation)
