= Lady of Good Counsel =

Lady of Good Counsel, or, Our Lady of Good Counsel, or, Holy Lady of Good Counsel, or, Virgin Lady of Good Counsel, may refer to:

== In general ==
- Mary, mother of Jesus, by way of a religious title
- Another form of "Our Lady of Good Counsel" ("Virgin Mother of Good Counsel"), a title for Mary, mother of Jesus

== Groups, organizations ==
- Our Lady of Good Counsel parish, Forestville, Roman Catholic Diocese of Broken Bay, Sydney, New South Wales, Australia
- Our Lady of Good Counsel Parish, Mariaheide, Meierijstad, North Brabant, Netherlands
- Our Lady of Good Counsel Parish, Rennselaer, State of New York, USA; see List of suppressed parishes in the Roman Catholic Diocese of Albany

== Places ==
- Priory of Our Lady of Good Counsel, Sayers Common, West Sussex, England, UK; see List of monastic houses in West Sussex
- Our Lady of Good Counsel Church (disambiguation)

=== Schools ===
- Our Lady of Good Counsel High School (disambiguation)
- Our Lady of Good Counsel University, Albania
- Academy of Our Lady of Good Counsel, White Plains, New York State, USA
- Our Lady of Good Counsel School, Pearl City, Hawaii, USA
- Our Lady of Good Counsel Catholic School, Vienna, Virginia, USA; an elementary school
- Our Lady of Good Counsel Roman Catholic School, Sleaford, North Kesteven, Lincolnshire, England, UK
- Our Lady of Good Counsel Catholic Elementary School, Sharon, East Gwillimbury, Regional Municipality of York, Greater Toronto, Ontario, Canada
- Our Lady of Good Counsel elementary school, Catholic Independent Schools Vancouver Archdiocese, Vancouver, Canada

== See also ==
- Notre-Dame-du-Bon-Conseil (disambiguation) (French: Our Lady of Good Counsel)
- Mother of Good Counsel (disambiguation)
- Mary of Good Counsel (disambiguation)
- Good Counsel (disambiguation)
- Our Lady (disambiguation)
- Lady (disambiguation)
