= Notre-Dame-du-Bon-Conseil =

Notre-Dame-du-Bon-Conseil (Bon-Conseil for short; French: Our Lady of Good Counsel) may refer to:

== Settlements ==
- Notre-Dame-du-Bon-Conseil, Quebec (village), Canada; a village in the Drummond Regional County Municipality of Centre-du-Quebec
- Notre-Dame-du-Bon-Conseil, Quebec (parish), Canada; a civil parish in the Drummond Regional County Municipality of Centre-du-Quebec

== Churches ==
- Notre-Dame-du-Bon-Conseil Church, Honfleur, Quebec, Canada; a church in Bellechasse Regional County Municipality of Chaudière-Appalaches
- Mision de Notre-Dame de Bon Conseil (Lac La Grenouille), Frog Lake, Alberta, Canada; a Catholic mission destroyed in the Frog Lake Massacre of the North-West Rebellion, only the Bell of Frog Lake remains
- Chapelle Notre-Dame-du-Bon-Conseil, 7ieme arrondissement, Paris, France; a chapel in the 7th borough, see List of religious buildings in Paris
- Église Notre-Dame-du-Bon-Conseil, 18ieme arrondissement, Paris, France; a church in the 18th borough, see List of religious buildings in Paris
- Chapel Notre-Dame de Bon Conseil, Seneffe, Walloon, Belgium; see List of protected heritage sites in Seneffe
- Église Notre-Dame du Bon-Conseil de Tunis, Tunis, Tunisia; see List of Catholic churches in Tunisia

== Abbeys, monasteries ==
- Abbaye Notre-Dame-du-Bon-Conseil, Saint-Romuald, Quebec, Canada (1902-2001); formerly an abbey in Levis, metropolitan Quebec City area
- Notre-Dame-du-Bon-Conseil Abbey, Saint-Benoît-Labre, Quebec, Canada (since 2001); an abbey in municipalité régionale de comté de Beauce-Sartigan of Chaudière-Appalaches

== Schools ==
- École Notre-Dame-Du-Bon-Conseil, La Malbaie, Quebec, Canada; a school in the metropolitan Quebec City area; see List of schools in Quebec
- Pensionnat Notre-Dame-du-Bon-Conseil, Sudbury, Ontario, Canada; formerly a girls school, former name of the co-ed school Collège Notre-Dame (Sudbury)

== Other uses ==
- Notre-Dame-du-Bon-Conseil pavilion, Les Bergeronnes, Quebec, Canada; a pavilion in MRC La Haute-Côte-Nord of Côte-Nord
- Mary, mother of Jesus, by a religious title rendered in French
  - Our Lady of Good Counsel (French: Notre Dame de Bon Conseil), a religious title in French, for Mary, mother of Jesus

== See also ==
- Notre Dame de Bon Secours (disambiguation), an alternate form of "Notre-Dame-de-Bon-Conseil"
- Lady of Good Counsel (disambiguation)
- Notre Dame (disambiguation)
