= Our Lady of Good Help =

Our Lady of Good Help is an alternate rendering of Our Lady of Good Counsel, a religious title for Mary of Nazareth, mother of Jesus

Our Lady of Good Help may also refer to:

== Churches ==
- National Shrine of Our Lady of Good Help, Champion, Green Bay, Wisconsin, USA; a catholic shrine
- The Church of Our Lady of Good Help, Pioneer Square, Seattle, WA, USA
- Our Lady of Good Help Church, Brandon, Vermont, USA; see List of parishes in the Roman Catholic Diocese of Burlington
- Chapel of Our Lady of Good Help (la Chapelle de Notre-Dame-du-Bon-Secours), St. Norbert, Winnipeg, Manitoba, Canada
- Chapel of Our Lady of Good Help, Bavarian Forest Museum Village, Bavaria, Germany

== Other uses ==
- Our Lady of Good Help RC Primary School, Wavertree, Liverpool, Merseyside, England, UK; see List of schools in Liverpool
- Our Lady of Good Help, Edmonton, Alberta, Canada; a parish in the Maronite Catholic Eparchy of Saint Maron of Montreal

== See also ==
- Titles of Mary, mother of Jesus
- Notre Dame de Bon Secours (disambiguation) (French: Our Lady of Good Help)
- Help (disambiguation)
- Good (disambiguation)
- Good Counsel (disambiguation)
- Our Lady (disambiguation)
