= Our Lady of Good Counsel Church =

Our Lady of Good Counsel Church, or variations with Parish or otherwise, may refer to:

in Albania

- Sanctuary of Our Lady of Good Counsel, Skoder, Albania

in Canada

- Our Lady of Good Counsel Mission, Frog Lake, Alberta, Canada; a Catholic mission destroyed in the Frog Lake Massacre of the North-West Rebellion, only the Bell of Frog Lake remains

in India

- Church of Our Lady of Good Counsel & Shrine of St. Anthony, Sion, in Mumbai

in Norway

- Our Lady of Good Counsel Church, Porsgrunn

in Slovenia

- Our Lady of Good Counsel Church, Globočice pri Kostanjevici

in the United States

- Our Lady of Good Counsel Church (Bridgeport, Connecticut)
- Our Lady of Good Counsel Catholic Church (Pearl City, Hawaii)
- The church associated with Our Lady of Good Counsel High School (Montgomery County, Maryland)
- Our Lady of Good Counsel Church (Manhattan)
- Our Lady of Good Counsel's Church (Staten Island, New York)
- Our Lady of Good Counsel Church (Moorestown, New Jersey)

== See also ==
- Good Counsel Complex, White Plains, New York, NRHP-listed
- Saint Mary of Good Counsel Catholic Church (Adrian, Michigan), Adrian, Michigan, NRHP-listed
- Lady of Good Counsel (disambiguation)
