= Mary of Good Counsel =

Mary of Good Counsel, or, Virgin Mary of Good Counsel, or, Saint Mary of Good Counsel, or, Holy Mary of Good Counsel, or Mother Mary of Good Counsel, may refer to:

== In general ==
- Mary, mother of Jesus, by way of a religious title
- Another form of "Saint Mary of Good Counsel" ("Virgin Mother of Good Counsel", "Our Lady of Good Counsel"), a title for Mary, mother of Jesus

== Churches ==
- Saint Mary of Good Counsel Catholic Church (Adrian, Michigan), USA; a NRHP-listed church building in Lenawee County, in the Roman Catholic Diocese of Lansing
- St. Mary of Good Counsel Church (Concessa), Catona, Reggio Calabria, Italy
- Santa Maria del Buon Consiglio (Italian: Church of Saint Mary of Good Counsel), Via Tuscolana, Rome, Italy

== Other uses ==
- Maria Mutter vom Guten Rat (German: Mother Mary of Good Counsel), Lichterfelde-Süd, Berlin-Lankwitz, Steglitz-Zehlendorf, Berlin, Brandenburg, Germany; a parish founded in 1980 in Mater Dolorosa (Berlin-Lankwitz)

== See also ==
- Lady of Good Counsel (disambiguation)
- Good Counsel (disambiguation)
- Virgin Mary (disambiguation)
- Saint Mary (disambiguation)
- Mother Mary (disambiguation)
- Mary (disambiguation)
