= Our Lady of Good Counsel High School =

Our Lady of Good Counsel High School may refer to:

- Our Lady of Good Counsel High School (Montgomery County, Maryland), a private, Catholic, college-preparatory high school in Olney, Montgomery County, Maryland (United States)
- Our Lady of Good Counsel High School (New Jersey), a school in Newark, New Jersey (United States), that closed in 2006 and is now home to Christ the King Preparatory School
- Our Lady of Good Counsel High School, Mumbai, a Catholic, coeducational school in Mumbai, Maharashtra (India)

== See also ==
- Academy of Our Lady of Good Counsel, White Plains, New York State, USA; an all-girls high school
- Lady of Good Counsel (disambiguation)
