= Preston High School (New York City) =

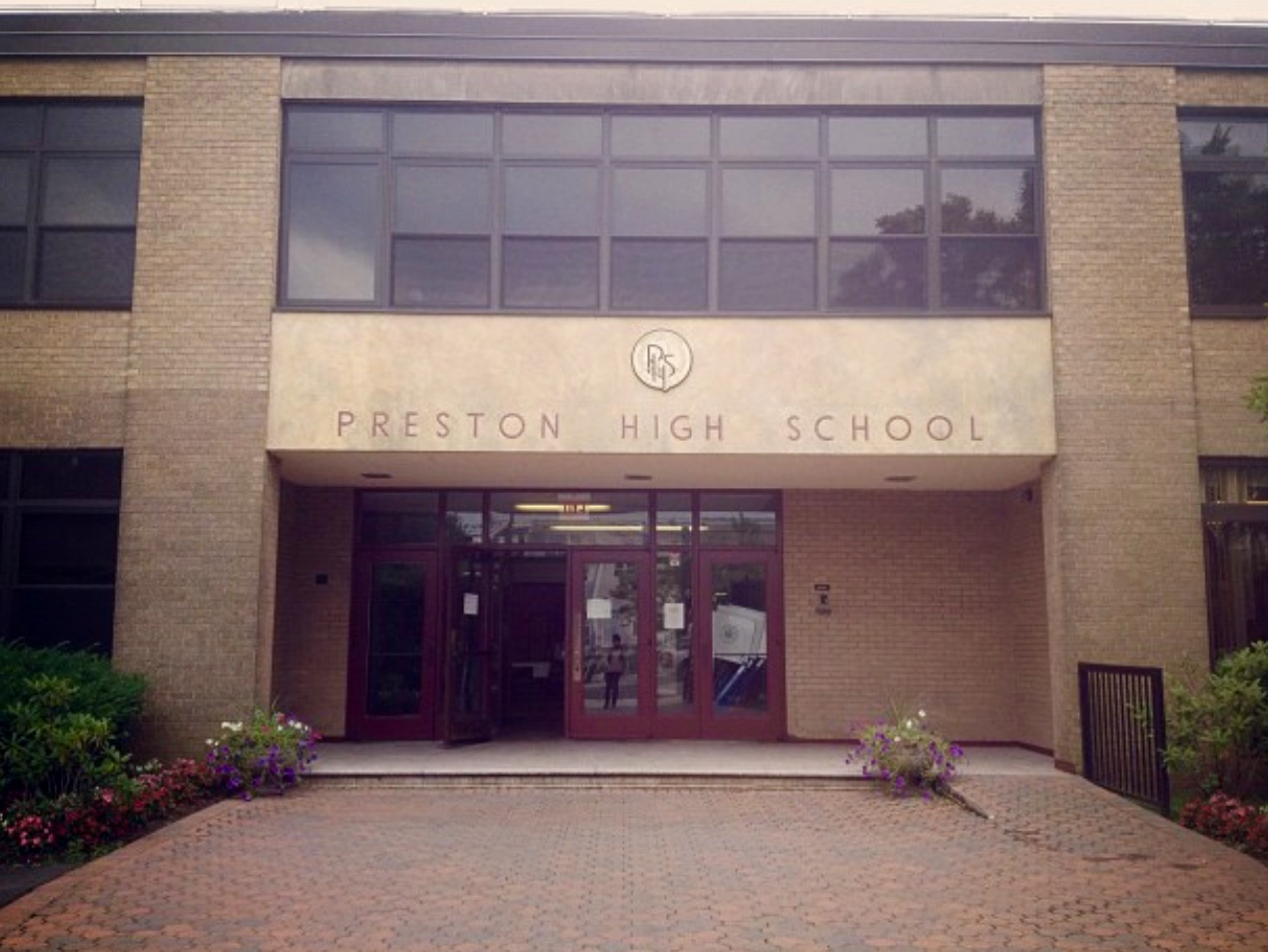
- Main entrance to Preston High School

Location
- 2780 Schurz Avenue; Bronx, New York City, New York 10465; United States
- 40°48′50″N 73°49′10″W

Information
- Type: Private, all-female
- Religious affiliation: Roman Catholic
- Established: 1947 (79 years ago)
- Principal: Jennifer Connolly
- Faculty: 51
- Grades: 9–12
- Student to teacher ratio: 13:1
- Colors: Maroon; White
- Accreditation: Middle States Association of Colleges and Schools
- Publication: Veritas (literary magazine)
- Newspaper: Preston Echoes
- Tuition: $11,995 (2022–23)
- Assistant Principal of Academics: Craig Youngren
- Assistant Principal of Student Life and Facilities: Edgar Martinez
- Senior Director of Recruitment and Development: Cristina Fragale
- Athletic Director: Jamie Skrapits
- Website: prestonhs.org

Preston High School is an American Roman Catholic high school for girl students and is located in the Throggs Neck neighborhood of the New York City borough of the Bronx. The school is chartered by the Board of Regents of the University of the State of New York and is accredited by the Middle States Association of Colleges and Schools.

Its enrollment is about 600 young women from the Bronx and the metropolitan surrounding areas. Fifty-one percent of students are minority, and 49 percent are white. The student–faculty ratio is 13 to one, and 100 percent of graduates are accepted into post-secondary institutions.

== History ==
Preston High School was established in 1947 by the Sisters of the Divine Compassion, as an independent, college-preparatory school.

The original school building, also known as "The Huntington Mansion" or "the mansion" to students and faculty, was the 19th-century waterfront mansion of Collis P. Huntington, whose wife Arabella Duvall Huntington purchased the property from Frederick C. Havemeyer, Jr. in 1884. Havemeyer lived there from 1863 when he purchased the property from the heirs of Dominick Lynch Lawrence. Prestonites believe the mansion is haunted by a ghost named Archie.

The estate was sold to the Sisters of the Divine Compassion in 1927 and they established The House of the Holy Family as a residence and a school for girls. This was converted to a high school in 1947 and the name was changed in the memory of Monsignor Thomas Scott Preston, who with Mother Mary Veronica (Mary Caroline Dannat Star) founded the Sisters of the Divine Compassion.

The school was expanded in 1960 and in 1965 to add another building, referred to by students as the "new building". This new building included many more classrooms, a gymnasium, a cafeteria, a library and science labs. Over the years, a computer room was added as technology changed.

The school's motto is Virtus Mille Scuta, a Latin phrase meaning "Virtue is a thousand shields". The school shield comprises the coat of arms of Monsignor Thomas Preston and the seal of the Sisters of the Divine Compassion.

In 1997, on the school's fiftieth anniversary, the school logo was modified to add elements of the official shield. The Throgs Neck Bridge is incorporated in the logo and represents the "bridge to opportunity", which represents the rite of passage of attending high school and moving on to be a productive member of the community and of society.

On February 25, it was announced by the board of trustees that Preston High School will officially close its doors at the end of the 2024-2025 school year. After the announcement, a rally cry from the staff, students, parents and many alumni was sent throughout the Bronx to advocate for the school to remain open. After a hearing by NY State Attorney General Letitia James, pressure was placed on the Divine order of sisters to accept a deal with the Ballys Foundation. On April 22, it was announced that a deal was reached for the sale of Preston High School for $8.5 million dollars. As a result of the deal, the school will remain open for 25 years until a new lease agreement is finalized.

== Curriculum ==
As all classes are college-preparatory, 100% of Preston students go on to attend university. Past graduates have attended Harvard University, Yale University, Brown University, Cornell University, Columbia University, New York University, Vassar College, Trinity College (Dublin), East Carolina University, and many other distinguished institutions.

Students are urged to consider careers in all fields, especially those in which women are under-represented. Students are particularly encouraged to consider engineering, mathematics, early childhood education and computer science. The academic program is enriched by engineering exploration days, annual mathematics and science contests, and numerous science and computer-based electives. The school has equipped labs for computers, science, and mathematics. Advanced technologies are implemented for AP calculus and related courses.

The average SAT score for graduating seniors is approximately 1510 on the 2400 scale, with a breakdown of 500 in both critical reading and mathematics, and a 510 average in writing. The school maintains excellent percentiles in the New York State Regents exams – particularly in the fields of English, social studies, and the humanities.

Foreign language proficiency is also prominent at Preston. Italian, Spanish, and Latin classes are mandatory for all students and courses are available for advanced speakers.

The school serves the Roman Catholic Archdiocese of New York, but is not directly affiliated with a particular parish. Rather, the school continues in the tradition of the Sisters of the Divine Compassion.

The building served as the residence for the school's sisters until the summer of 2004, when their apartments were converted to accommodate a growing student body.

== Notable alumnae ==
- Amanda Farías (2007), member, New York City Council
- Jennifer Lopez (1987), singer, dancer, and actress
- Lynda Lopez (1989), WWOR-TV news anchor, journalist, former DJ and VJ, host of the GLOW television show, and younger sister of Jennifer Lopez
