= Notre-Dame-de-Bon-Secours =

Notre Dame de Bonsecours or Nôtre-Dame-du-Bon-Secours is French for "Our Lady of Good Help", an alternate form of Notre-Dame-de-Bon-Conseil, "Our Lady of Good Counsel", a religious title for Mary, mother of Jesus.

It may refer to:

== Settlements ==
- Notre-Dame-de-Bonsecours, Quebec, Canada; a municipality in Outaouais; formerly Notre-Dame-de-Bon-Secours-Partie-Nord, formerly Notre-Dame-de-Bon-Secours-de-la-Petite-Nation
- Notre-Dame-de-Bon-Secours, Quebec, Canada; a former municipality, merged into Richelieu in 2000

== Churches and chapels ==
- Notre-Dame-de-Bon-Secours Chapel, Old Port, Old Montreal, Ville-Marie, Montreal, Quebec, Canada
- la Chapelle de Notre-Dame-du-Bon-Secours (Chapel of Our Lady of Good Help), St. Norbert, Winnipeg, Manitoba, Canada
- Église de Notre-Dame-de-Bon-Secours, L'Islet, Chaudière-Appalaches, Quebec, Canada; see List of historic places in Chaudière-Appalaches
- Notre-Dame du bon secours Church, La Désirade, French West Indies, Lesser Antilles, Caribbean; in overseas France
- Basilica of Notre-Dame de Bon Secours, France; several basilicas, see List of basilicas in France
  - Basilique Notre-Dame de Bonsecours, Bonsecours, Rouen, Seine—Maritime, France
- Église Notre-Dame de Bon Secours, Bercy, Paris, France; the 17th century predecessor to the 19th century Église Notre-Dame-de-la-Nativité de Bercy
- Chapel Notre-Dame-du-Bon-Secours de Salsignac, Antignac, Cantal, Auvergne, France
- Notre Dame de Bon Secours chapel, Saint-Jérôme Church (Toulouse), Toulouse, France
- Chapel of Notre-Dame-du-Bon-Secours, Granges de Dauban, Banon, Alpes-de-Haute-Provence, Provence-Alpes-Côte d'Azur, France
- Chapel of Notre-Dame-de-Bon-Secours, Angles, Alpes-de-Haute-Provence, Provence-Alpes-Côte d'Azur, France
- Notre Dame de Bon Secours chapel, Le Parcq, Pas-de-Calais, Hauts-de-France, France
- Notre-Dame du Bon Secours, Estocq, Monsures, Sommes, Hauts-de-France, France
- Notre-Dame-de-Bon-Secours, Chapel of Saint-Barthélémy, Château de Châtillon-d'Azergues, Châtillon, Rhône, France
- Chapelle Notre-Dame de bon-secours, Tréguier Cathedral, Tréguier, Côtes-d'Armor, France

== Schools ==
- Collège Notre dame du bon secours, Pignon, Saint-Raphael, Nord, Haiti
- Lycée privé Notre-Dame de Bon Secours, Perpignan, France; see List of schools in France

== Other uses ==
- Abbaye Notre-Dame de Bon Secours de Blauvac, Blauvac, Vaucluse, Provence-Alpes-Côte d'Azur, France; see List of Cistercian monasteries in France
- Notre Dame de Bon Secours, or Our Lady of Prompt Succor, a devotional sculpture in Louisiana

== See also ==
- Canadian Pacific Railway Co. v Notre Dame de Bonsecours, a 1899 Canadian constitutional law case concerning lower level jurisdictional law applicability on federally regulated entities
- Our Lady of Good Help (disambiguation)
- Notre-Dame-du-Bon-Conseil (disambiguation)
- Notre Dame (disambiguation)
- Bonsecours (disambiguation)
