= Good Advice =

Good Advice may refer to:

- Good Advice (film), a 2001 film
- Good Advice (album), by Basia Bulat, 2016
- Good Advice (TV series), 1993
- "Good Advice" (song), a 1984 song by Mondo Rock
- "Good Advice", a song by Allan Sherman from the 1964 album Allan in Wonderland
- "Good Advice", a song by Willie Dixon from the 1988 album Hidden Charms
- "Good Advices", a song by R.E.M. from the 1985 album Fables of the Reconstruction

== See also ==
- Good Counsel (disambiguation)
- Advice (disambiguation)
- Good (disambiguation)
