= Scipione Vannutelli =

Italian painter

Scipione Vannutelli (November 1831 in Genazzano, Papal States – 1894 in Rome, Kingdom of Italy) was an Italian painter, active in a Romantic style.

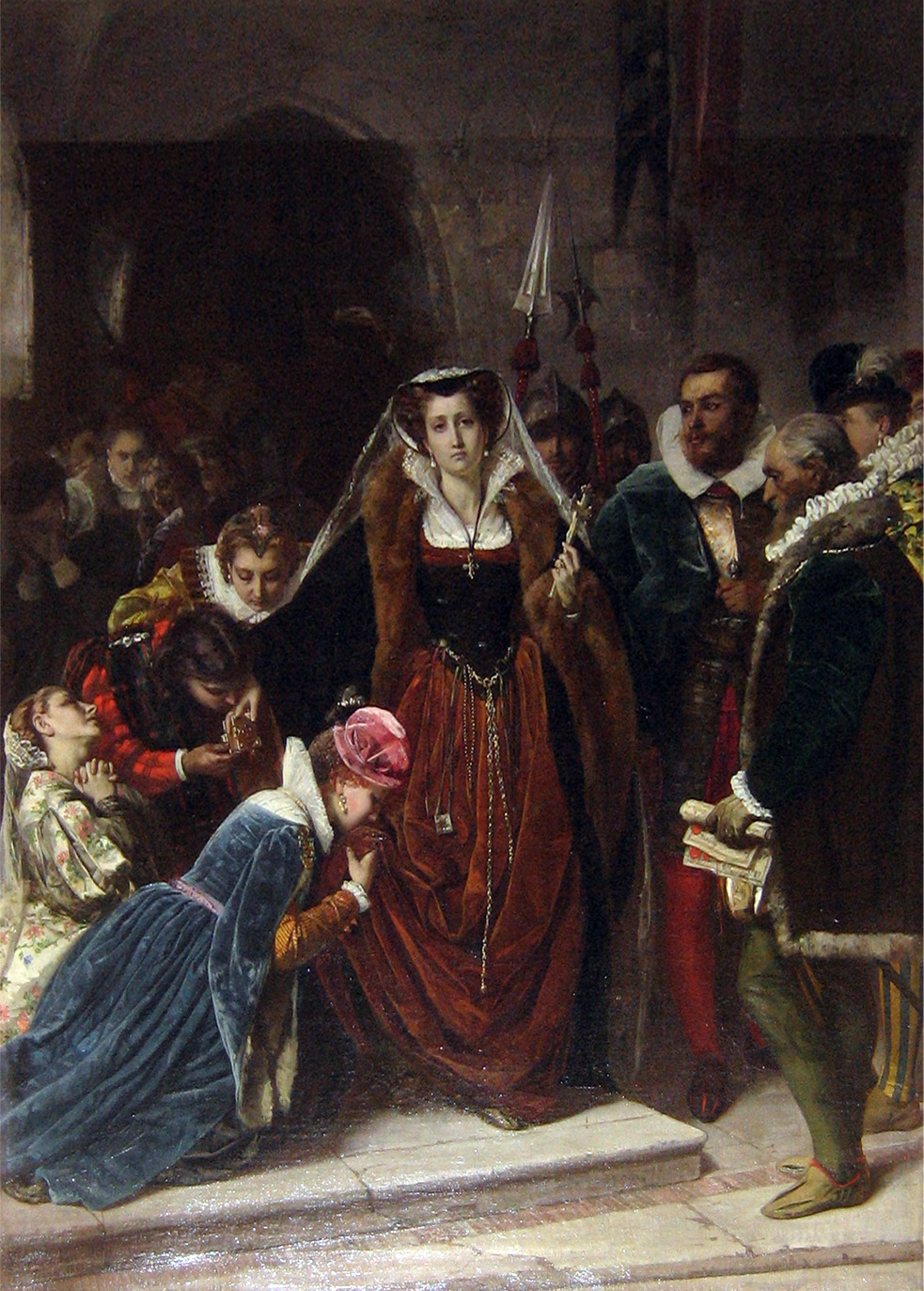
Mary Stuart walks to the Scaffold (Winner at Florentine Exposition of 1861

His father was opposed to his study of art, but ultimately found a position as a pupil of Tommaso Minardi, then of the Viennese painter, Karl Wursinger, and later studied in Paris. He was successful in the Parisian Salon exhibition of 1864 when he gained the praise of art historian Léon Lagrange. He continued to paint mainly historical subjects depicting, for example Fra Girolamo Savonarola, Mary Stuart at the Scaffold (Pitti Palace, Florence), and the Funeral of Juliet (1888, Galleria Nazionale d'Arte Moderna, Rome). He had a studio in the Palazzo Pamphili on Piazza Navona. He was named as the superintendent of the Royal Calcografia (Engraving) Ministry. His daughter Giuseppina Vannutelli was also a painter.

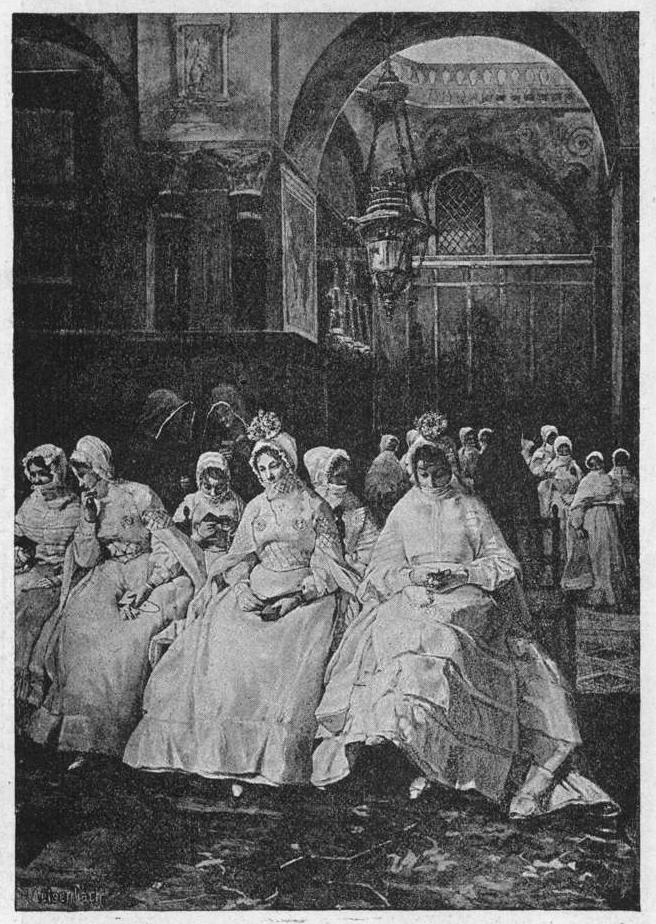
Novices in Rome (1883)

In 1864, he was awarded a medal at the Paris Exposition for his canvas:Stroll of the Noblemen under the Ducal Palace of Venice, which typified his fidelity to architecture and costume of the period of the Venetian republic. He also painted An Idyll and a Choir of Cathedral, a painting acquired by Mr Edwin Morgan of New York. He also painted La festa del Redentore in Venice; The Dream of Venus; The invitation to Dance; Le mantellate; Odalisque in the Harem, and portraits of King Vittorio Emanuele after death, and of Umberto I, in his dress of the Order of the Giarrettiera; La leggitrice; Sulla riva del mare; Bebé; Ciociari e Giulietta Capuleti, exhibited in Bologna, in 1888. Vannutelli was named knight of the Order of Saints Maurice and Lazarus, member of many Academies, and for many years was president of the Circolo Artistico of Rome.
