= Mapleton (White Plains, New York) =

Historic house in New York, United States

- U.S. National Register of Historic Places
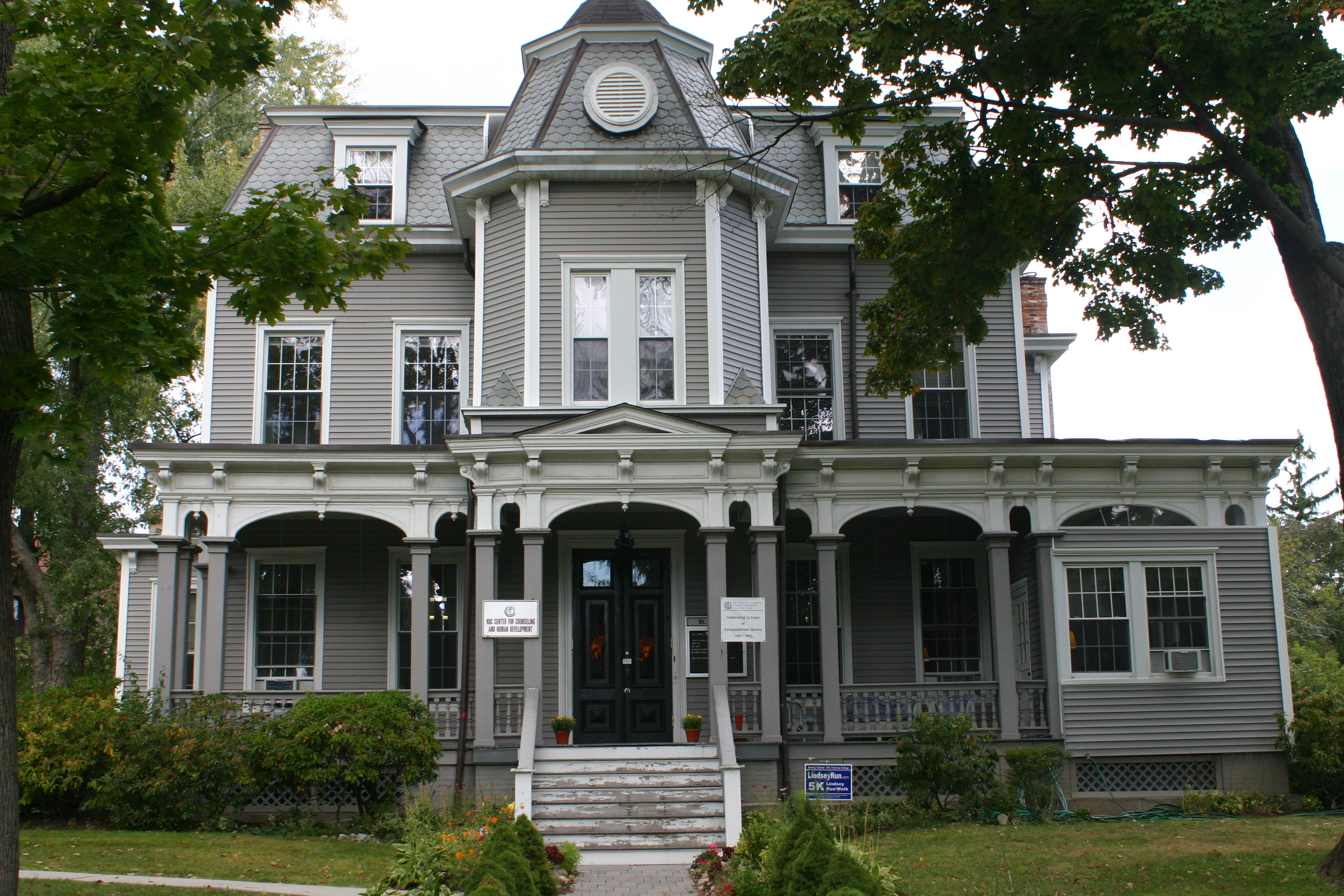

- Location within New York Location within the United States
- Location: 52 N. Broadway, White Plains, New York
- Coordinates: 41°2′18″N 73°45′54″W
- Area: 1.2 acres (0.49 ha)
- Built: 1867
- Architectural style: Second Empire, Italianate
- NRHP reference No.: 76001295
- Added to NRHP: September 28, 1976

Mapleton, also known as St. Joseph House, is a historic building located at White Plains, Westchester County, New York. It was added to the National Register of Historic Places in 1976.

== Description ==
"Mapleton" is a large, 2 1/2-story five-bay residence with Second Empire and Italianate-style design details. It features a large verandah, a central pavilion tower capped with a small dome, and a mansard roof with slate tiles. Also on the property is a polygonal frame gazebo.

== History ==
Built in 1867, for William Franklin Dusenbury, a carriage manufacturer, it was purchased in 1884 by Nathan H. Hand.

In 1890, Mary Caroline Dannat Starr (Mother Mary Veronica) was looking for a place to relocate and expand the work of her recently approved religious institute, the Sisters of the Divine Compassion. She purchased from James Tilford, a fourteen-acre estate on Broadway in White Plains, New York, including a three-story frame house built in 1856 by Eugene T. Preudhomme for John M. Tilford of Park and Tilford. She renamed it Good Counsel Farm. In 1894, in anticipation of the construction of the congregation's chapel on the site of the Tilson mansion, she bought the adjoining "Mapleton" from Nathan Hand. From 1894 to 1925, it housed the convent of the Sisters of the Divine Compassion. (The Tilford house was moved elsewhere on the property and became Our Lady of Good Counsel Academy Elementary School.)

In 1924, the Sisters opened Good Counsel College, and the following year "Mapleton" was put to academic use. It became known as "Alumnae House'. While Good Counsel College became the College of White Plains, and merged with Pace University in 1976, the Religious of the Divine Compassion retained title to "Mapleton", as well as, most of their property. "Mapleton" has been used a conference center. In November 2015 The Sisters of Divine Compassion sold the 16-acre property to WP Development NB LLC, a group of investors led by George Comfort & Sons, but retain the use of the Chapel of Divine Compassion and Mapleton/St. Joseph. The latter houses the congregation's administrative offices and the RDC Center for Counseling & Human Development.

It was added to the National Register of Historic Places in 1976. In 1997, it was included as part of the Good Counsel Complex national historic district.

== See also ==
- National Register of Historic Places listings in southern Westchester County, New York
