= Sisters of the Divine Compassion =

The Sisters of the Divine Compassion (also known as Religious of Divine Compassion (RDC)) are a Roman Catholic religious institute founded in New York City in 1886 by Mother Mary Veronica (formerly Mary Dannat Starr), Msgr. Thomas Preston, and a group of young women moved by the "Compassion of God" in their lives and by a desire to bring that compassion to New York City’s destitute children in tangible ways.

== History ==
=== Mary Caroline Dannat Starr ===
Mary Caroline Dannat Starr came from a wealthy New York family. She was born in New York City on April 27, 1838, the oldest of six children born to William Henry and Susannah Jones Dannat. Susanna Dannat was the daughter of Daniel Jones, a Welsh immigrant who became a wealthy merchant and amassed a fortune in brewing and real estate. William Dannat came from a prosperous Episcopal family involved in the lumber business in the New York area in the firm Dannat Pell.

Her family had occasionally attended the neighborhood Baptist church. In 1857, at the age of nineteen, she married Walter Smith Starr. They moved to Brooklyn where she briefly attended a Congregationalist church. The marriage produced two sons, Chandler Dannat (b. Sept.3, 1858) and Walter Dannat (b. March 11, 1860). While her mother joined an Episcopal congregation, her father had by then gravitated towards the tenets of the Swedenborgian Church, and Mary Caroline did the same.

=== Association of the Holy Family ===
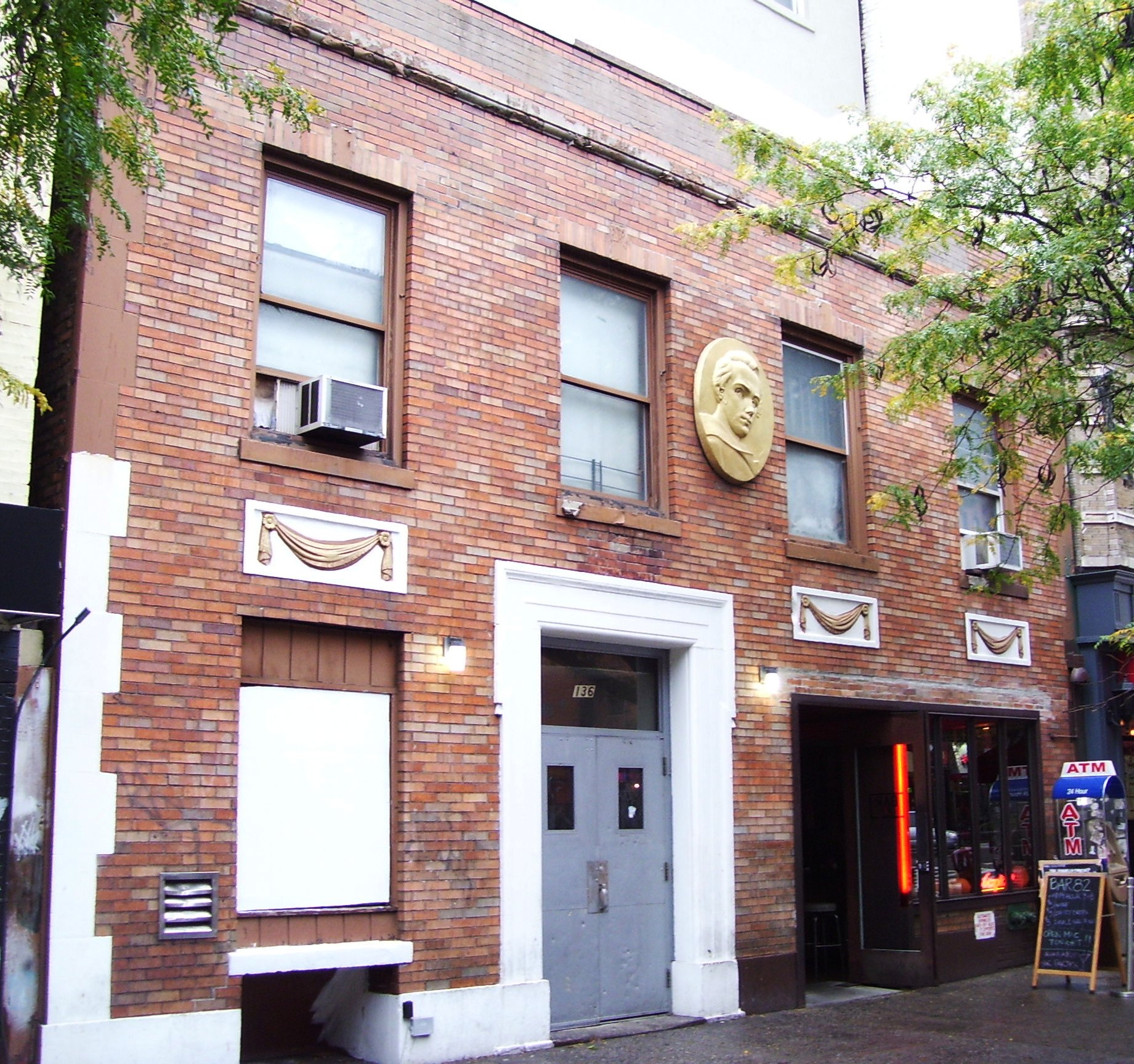
136 Second Avenue

Dissatisfied with her faith community, she sought instruction in Catholicism from Father Thomas Preston, parish priest of St. Ann's on the East Side. and was received into the Catholic Church in April 1868. Shortly after that, now widowed, she founded with Father Preston's assistance the Association of the Holy Family, with a house at 316 W14th. That autumn she and some associates opened a sewing school for girls in St. Bernard's parish, whose congregation was mostly Irish immigrants and their descendants. The school also provided the children with lunch, and by Christmas 250 students were enrolled.

To better indicate its aims and mission, the group would change its name to the Association for Befriending Children and Young Girls, and its activities extended to providing shelter, training, and religious education to girls left to fend for themselves or sent by their families into the street to beg, offering the girls safety, love, and hope. In 1870 they established the House of the Holy Family at 134-136 Second Avenue in Manhattan, accepting girls between the ages of 10 and 21 years. There were 102 girls cared for in 1900. Census records for 1910 show fifty-eight "dependent women and delinquent and unprotected girls" in residence. "Colored people" were not received.

=== Institute of the Divine Compassion ===
Seeing the necessity of a religious community which should be trained to this work and perpetuate it, Father Preston compiled a rule of life for those who desired to devote their lives to it. The first draft was written September 5, 1873, and was observed in its elemental form until 1886, when it was elaborated and obtained the informal approbation of the Archbishop of New York. Starr became Mother Mary Veronica. By the 1890s, the Sisters were also in charge of the Association for Befriending Children and Young Girls at the Second Avenue address and the House of Our Lady for Business Girls at 52-54 East 126th Street in Manhattan. On September 29, 1890, both rule and constitutions received the express canonical approbation of Archbishop Corrigan of New York.

The area around Second Avenue was becoming increasingly commercialized and less conducive to their work. With the advent of commuter rail travel and widespread use of the telephone, the "country" was becoming the "suburbs". In order to establish a novitiate and relocate the ministry, in 1890 Mother Veronica purchased from James Tilford, a fourteen acre estate on Broadway in White Plains, New York, including a three-story frame house built in 1856, with carpets and furniture for $25,000. The Tilford House was built in 1856 by Eugene T. Preudhomme for John M. Tilford of Park and Tilford. Dannat and Preston named it Good Counsel Farm and created the Vacation House for Working Girls there. The convent was at the historic Mapleton home in White Plains from 1894 to 1925.

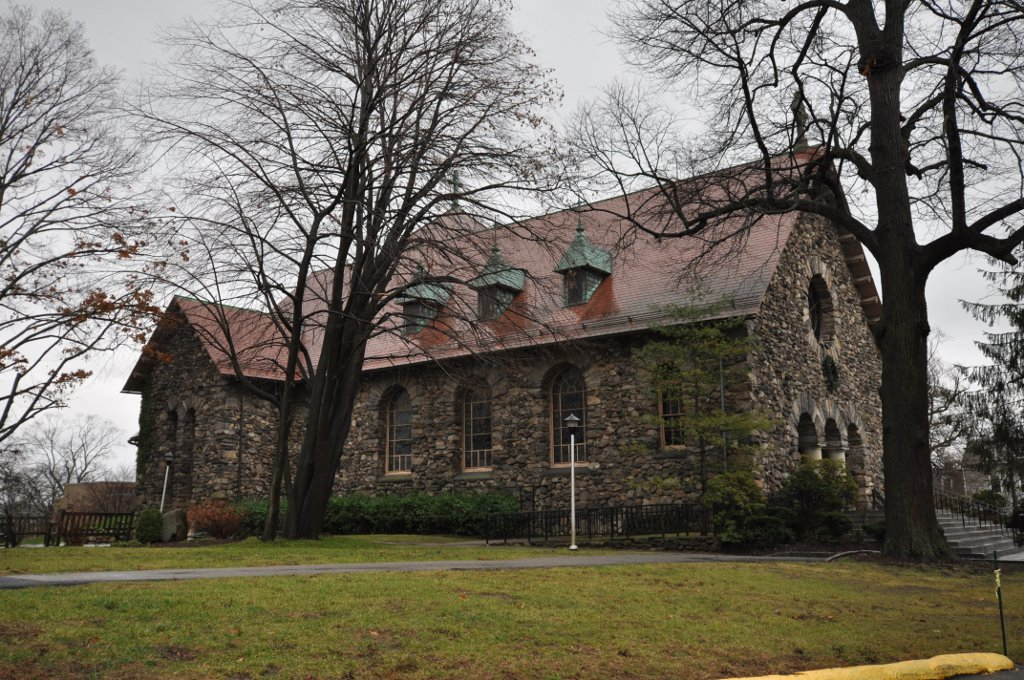
Good Counsel Chapel

In 1892 the House of Nazareth opened in White Plains and children from New York City relocated there. The chapel was erected on the site of the Tilford house that was the earlier convent for the Sisters in White Plains. To make room for the chapel, in 1895, the house was moved to the back of the property and was later enlarged and became Our Lady of Good Counsel Academy Elementary School. By the late 1890s, the Congregation and its ministry to children and young women were flourishing.

In 1901 Good Counsel Training School was begun, and in 1918 the Academy of Our Lady of Good Counsel high school was added to the eight-year elementary school.

In the 1920s the Sisters of the Divine Compassion were invited to staff seven parish schools and at the same time were developing a women’s college, Good Counsel College. In 1947 the congregation opened a second high school, Preston High School, in the Throggs Neck section of the Bronx, and served as educators in over 25 parishes in Manhattan, the Bronx, Westchester, and Putnam counties. In 1972, Good Counsel College became the College of White Plains, which was merged with Pace University in 1976. The Good Counsel Complex at White Plains was added to the National Register of Historic Places in 1997.

In February 2015 the Sisters announced that the Academy of Our Lady of Good Counsel high school would close in July 2015. The community's leadership team reported that, "multiple properties were investigated and eliminated as possible sites for relocation during this past year"; no suitable site was found affordable. Our Lady of Good Counsel Academy Elementary School closed in 2017.

== Present day ==
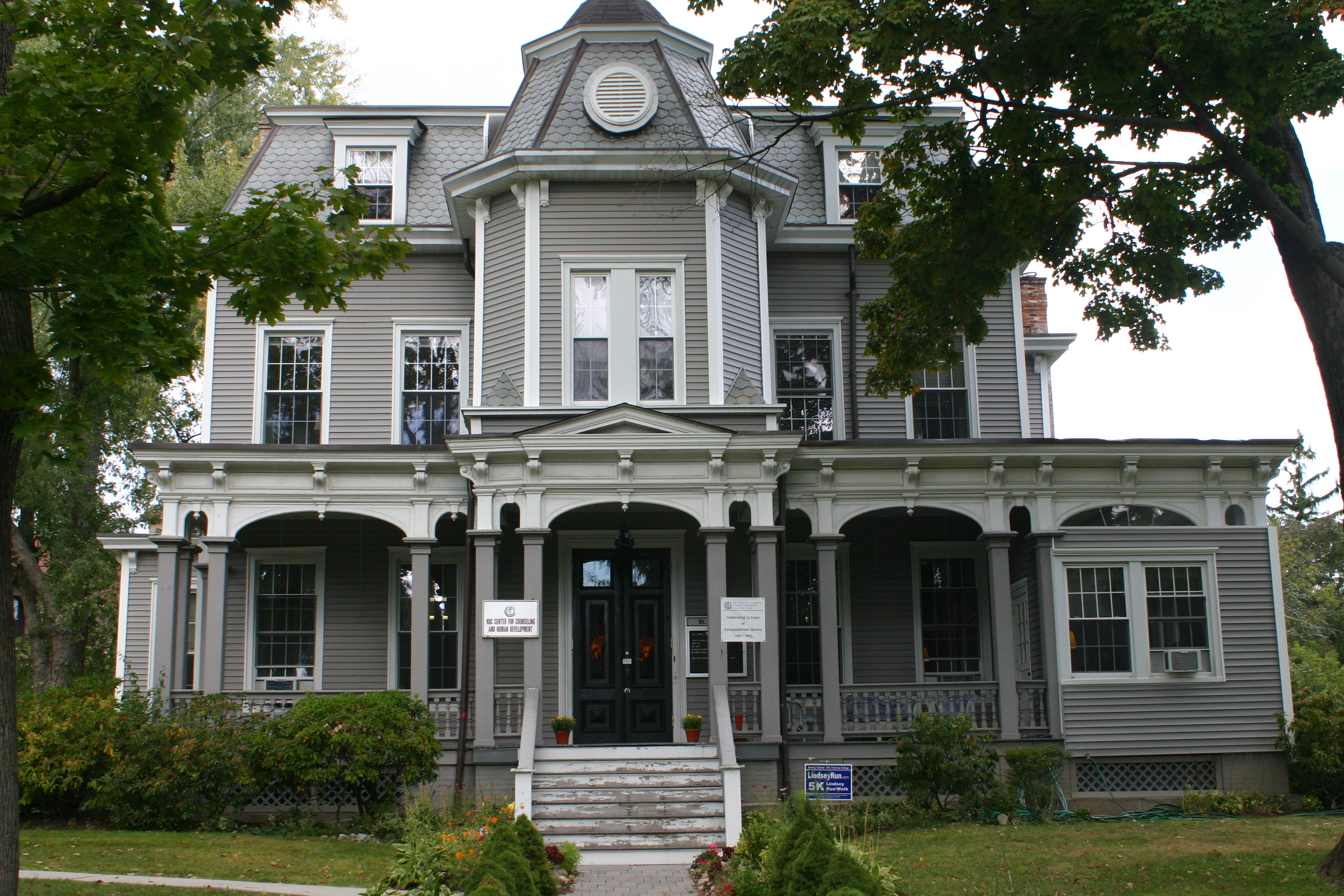
Mapleton/St. Joseph's

The Sisters of the Divine Compassion today are a religious community of vowed members, lay associates, and partners committed "to proclaim and witness by our lives and service the Compassionate Presence of God in our world." The community adopted a modified habit in 1967, and lay dress in 1973. As of 2018 the Sisters of the Divine Compassion number about 73 women serving in various ministries. These include Preston High School; the Center of Compassion in Dover Plains, New York that includes a food pantry and thrift shop; Preston Center of Compassion in the Bronx, which offers a variety of educational, business and social services; and the Divine Compassion Spirituality Center.

The Sisters sold the sixteen-acre campus in White Plains. The property has been granted landmark status. The Sisters retained use of the Chapel of the Divine Compassion under a fifty year lease, as well as, St. Joseph’s House, a nearby historic Victorian building, for the congregation's administrative offices. St. Joseph's also houses the RDC Center for Counseling & Human Development.

== See also ==
- Mapleton (White Plains, New York)
