= Good Counsel =

Good Counsel may refer to:

- Our Lady of Good Counsel High School (Montgomery County, Maryland), United States
- Good Counsel GAA, a Gaelic Athletic Association club in Dublin, Ireland
- Good Counsel Complex, in White Plains, New York, United States
- Good Counsel Hill, Mankato, Minnesota, USA; a hill

== See also ==
- Good Counsel College (disambiguation)
- Lady of Good Counsel (disambiguation)
- Mary of Good Counsel (disambiguation)
- Mother of Good Counsel (disambiguation)
- Good Advice (disambiguation)
- Counsel (disambiguation)
- Good (disambiguation)
- Buon Consiglio (disambiguation) (Italian: Good Counsel)
