= Good Counsel College =

Good Counsel College may refer to:

- Good Counsel College, Innisfail, Queensland, Australia
- St Augustine's and Good Counsel College, New Ross, County Wexford, Ireland; known as "Good Counsel College"
- Good Counsel College, White Plains, New York State, USA; a former college; see List of religious orders in the Roman Catholic Archdiocese of New York
- Colegio del Buen Consejo (Spanish: College of Good Counsel), Manila, Philippines; a destroyed college, see List of historical markers of the Philippines in Metro Manila

== See also ==
- Good Counsel (disambiguation)
