= Stephen Bellesini =

Beatified Italian friar

Blessed Stephen Bellesini
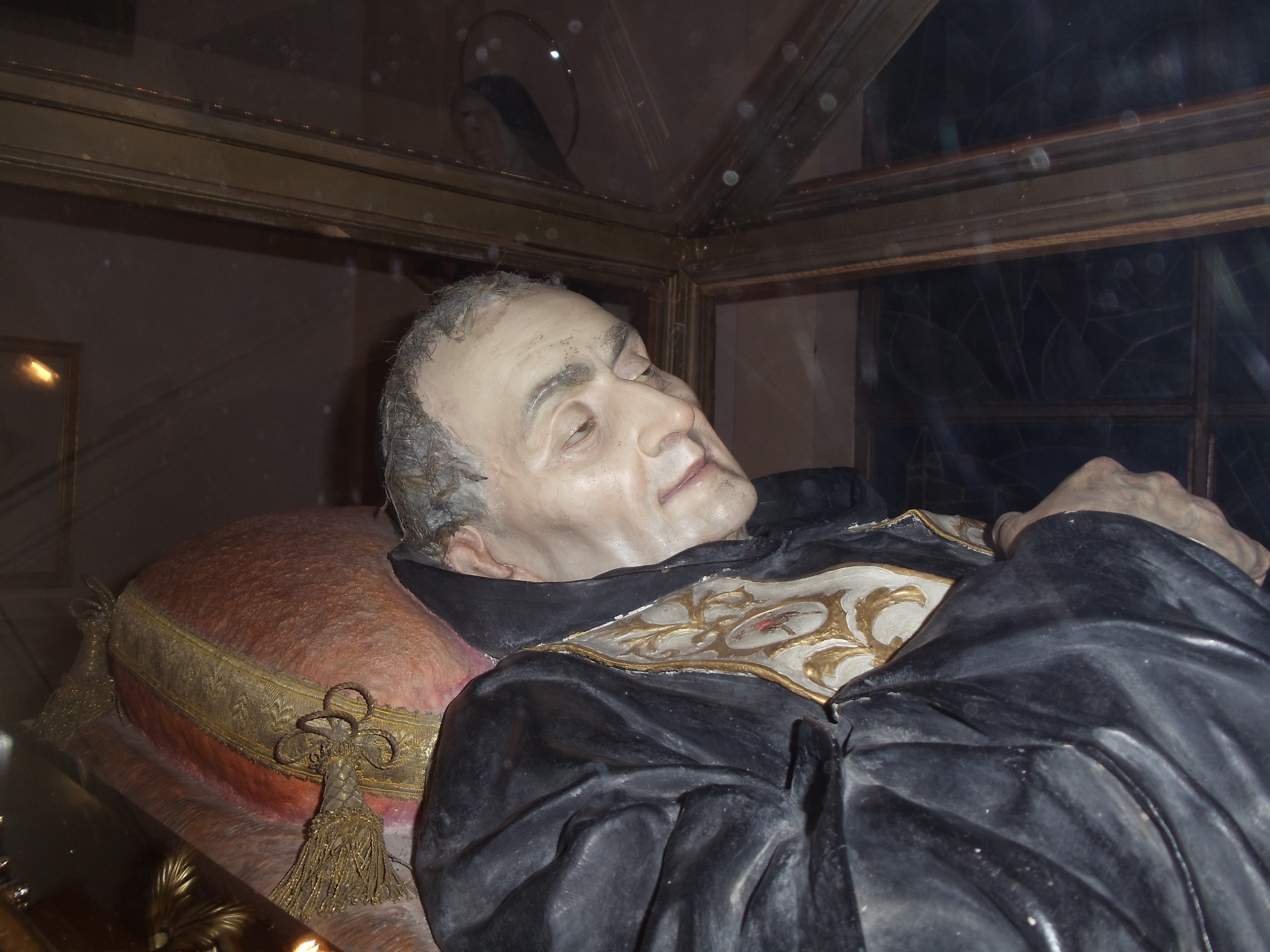
- Reliquary of Stephen Bellesini
- Born: November 25, 1774; Trento, Italy
- Died: February 2, 1840; Genazzano, Italy
- Venerated in: Roman Catholic Church
- Beatified: December 27, 1904, Vatican City by Pope Pius X
- Major shrine: Genazzano, Italy
- Feast: February 2

Stephen Bellesini was a Roman Catholic friar in the Order of the Hermits of Saint Augustine (O.S.A). He was born in Trento, Italy, on 25 November 1774, and died in Genazzano, Italy, on 2 February 1840.

== Life ==
Of the Italian aristocracy, Luigi Giuseppe Bellesini joined the Augustinians in 1790, taking the name Stefano, and made his profession on May 31, 1794. After studies in Rome and Bologna, he was forced to return to Trento during the government suppression of religious houses and completed his theological education there. Bellesini was ordained in 1797 and served primarily as a preacher and rector of the small chapel attached to the Order's monastery in Trento.

In 1810 the monastery in Trento was also ordered closed and Bellesini went to live at his brother's house where he lived as a secular priest. He dedicated his time to teaching poor children of the city. He also gave food, clothing and encouragement to his students. Bellesini became a great champion of the education of youth and the local authorities appointed him Director and Superintendent of all schools in the district.

In September 1817 he resigned from these offices and made his way to Rome in order to resume his religious life. The reaction in Trento was first shock, then indignation, and finally condemnation. The same government that had valued his work so highly now proclaimed him to be an exile and forbade him to return under threat of punishment. For a period, he was Novice Master for his Order, and in 1825 was transferred to Genazzano, home to the miraculous fresco of Our Lady of Good Counsel, for whom he had a great devotion. He was named parish priest in 1831.

During a cholera epidemic in January 1840, while answering a call to care for a sick parishioner, he tripped and fell. A cut on his leg became infected, and he developed a high fever. He tried to remain active for the next two days, but the fever never went away. He died February 2, 1840, in Genazzano. His remains are at the Shrine of Our Mother of Good Counsel in Genazzano.

== Veneration ==
He was beatified by Pope Pius X, on December 27, 1904, and the cause for his canonization was opened on 27 December 1904. His feast day is observed in the Catholic Church on February 3.

In Massachusetts is found the Blessed Stephen Bellesini OSA Academy, in collaboration with Merrimack College.
