= Sanctuary of Our Lady of Good Counsel =

18th-century basilica in Albania

The Basilica of Our Lady of Good Counsel (Albanian: Bazilika e Zojës së Këshillit të Mirë) or Kisha e Zojës is a Roman Catholic shrine and Minor Basilica in Shkoder dedicated to the Blessed Virgin Mary under the title of Our Lady of Good Counsel, the Patroness of the Republic of Albania.

At the foot of Rozafa Castle, the church began construction in 1917 under the Austro-Hungarian occupation of Albania during World War I. Highly revered by Albanian Catholics, it was demolished as a cult object during the Albanian Cultural Revolution, only to be rebuilt after the fall of communism.

Pope John Paul II visited the shrine on 25 April 1993. Pope Francis issued a Pontifical decree which raised the shrine to the status of Minor Basilica on 22 April 2024.

== History ==
A set of old walls at the site had long been venerated by Catholics as the ruins of a church to Our Lady of Good Counsel and by Muslims as that of a Bektashi Order khanqah. Ecclesiastical historian Daniele Farlati described an active dervish khanqah (Albanian: tekke) in the 18th century. The Ottoman government blocked off the walls when quarrels arose over which faith was entitled to their use, referring the matter to a commission including Jusuf Effendi Golemi and Shani Dedëjakupeva, who held that both Catholics and Muslims could worship there.

In 1917, the Catholic clergy gained Austro-Hungarian approval to build the church, provoking protests by Muslims in front of the Ministry of War building in Vienna. The church was dedicated to Our Lady of Good Counsel and completed in 1930. The Archbishop of Shkodër, Jak Serreqi, laid the cornerstone on March 25, 1917, and was buried there in 1922.

In 1946, after the communist takeover, over two thousand pilgrims visited, but not long after, it was turned into a ballroom and eventually would be destroyed during the Cultural Revolution. After the fall of communism, the church was rebuilt and its cornerstone was blessed by Pope John Paul II in 1993. The project was funded by Simeone Duca, a noted theologian belonging to the Arbanasi community of Albanians in Zadar, Croatia.

On April 26, 2024, coinciding with the feast of Our Lady of Good Counsel, the shrine was formally declared a minor basilica. This distinction was decreed through the Dicastery for Divine Worship on April 22, 2024 for the Archdiocese of Shkodër–Pult, which makes it the first basilica in Albania.
