= Thomas Scott Preston =

Roman Catholic Vicar-General of New York (1824–1891)

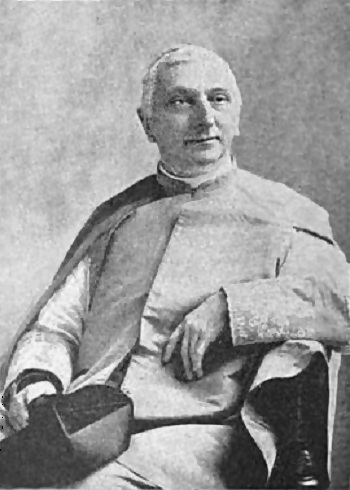

Thomas Scott Preston (23 July 1824 at Hartford, Connecticut – 4 November 1891 at New York City) was a Roman Catholic Vicar-General of New York, protonotary Apostolic, chancellor, author, preacher, and administrator

== Life ==
Thomas Preston was born in Hartford, Connecticut on 23 July 1824. His family was Episcopalian. He was graduated in 1843 from Washington (later Trinity) College, Hartford. He studied at the Protestant Episcopal Theological Seminary, located at Ninth Avenue and Twentieth Street, New York, where he was recognized as the leader of the High Church party. Preston graduated in 1846 he was ordained deacon, and served in this capacity at Trinity Church, the Church of the Annunciation in West Fourteenth Street, and at Holy Innocents, West Point.

In 1847 he was ordained presbyter by Bishop Delancey of Western New York, his own bishop having refused to advance him to this order on account of his ritualistic views. He now served for some time at St. Luke's, Hudson Street, New York, hearing confessions and urging frequent Holy Communion.

A student of the early history of the Christian Church and the Church Fathers, he gradually began to feel the branch theory untenable. In a change of personal conviction, he was received into the Catholic Church on 14 November 1849. He entered St. Joseph's Seminary in Fordham to complete his studies and in the autumn of 1850 was ordained priest by Rt. Rev. John McCloskey, then Bishop of Albany. Father Preston was assigned to duty at the old cathedral on Mott St.

In 1851 he was appointed pastor of St. Mary's in Yonkers with out-missions at Dobbs Ferry and Tarrytown. Father Preston sought to erect a mission church for the Tarrytown portion of his congregation. Despite opposition from prominent area residents, in late 1851 he purchased a piece of land on De Peyster Street on which St. Teresa’s Church now stands. The church served the growing Catholic community of immigrants that had come to build the Hudson River railroad. In 1853 the diocese of Brooklyn and Newark were created. Staff from the Archdiocese of New York were sent to administer these dioceses, and Archbishop Hughes was left without a chancellor or secretary. Preston was recalled from Yonkers to take these positions. He was appointed pastor of St. Ann's Church on Eighth St. in 1862, and was promoted in 1872 to be vicar-general. He was a firm supporter of the parochial school system. He was appointed monsignor in 1881. During the absence of Archbishop Corrigan in 1890 he was administrator of the diocese.

He founded and directed for many years the Sisters of the Divine Compassion. His Advent and Lenten conferences attracted hearers from all parts of the city.

== Works ==
His works are:

- "Reason and Revelation" (New York, 1868);
- "The Divine Paraclete" (1879);
- "Ark of the Covenant" (1860);
- "The Divine Sanctuary" (1887);
- "Gethsemani (1887);
- "The Sacred Year" (1885);
- "Vicar of Christ" (1878);
- "The Protestant Reformation" (1879);
- "Protestantism and the Church" (1882);
- "Protestantism and the Bible" (1888);
- "Christian Unity" (1881);
- "The Watch on Calvary" (1885);
- "Christ and the Church" (1870);
- "God and Reason" (1884);
- "Devotion to the Sacred Heart";
- "The Life of St Mary Magdalene or the Path of Penitence" (1863).
