= Mother Mary (disambiguation) =

Mother Mary was a first-century Jewish woman of Nazareth, the wife of Joseph and the mother of Jesus.

Mother Mary may also refer to:

- Maria Skobtsova (1891–1945), widely known as Mother Maria/Mary, Russian Orthodox noblewoman and saint
- Mother Mary (1983 film), a Soviet biopic
- Mother Mary (2026 film), an American epic melodrama film by David Lowery
- Mothermary, an American electropop duo
- "Mother Mary" (song), a 2008 song by Foxboro Hot Tubs
- "Mother Mary", a song by Julian Lennon from the 1989 album Mr. Jordan
- "Mother Mary", a song by Rihanna from the 2012 album Unapologetic
