= Genazzano =

- Comune
- Comune di Genazzano
- Flag Coat of arms

- Location within Italy Location within Lazio
- Coordinates: 41°50′N 12°58′E
- Country: Italy
- Region: Lazio
- Metropolitan city: Rome (RM)

Government
  - Mayor: Fabio Ascenzi (Centre-Left)

Area
  - Total: 32.04 km^{2} (12.37 sq mi)
- Elevation: 375 m (1,230 ft)

Population (31 August 2017)
  - Total: 5,980
  - Density: 187/km^{2} (483/sq mi)
- Demonym: Genazzanesi
- Time zone: UTC+1 (CET)
  - Summer (DST): UTC+2 (CEST)
- Postal code: 00030
- Dialing code: 06
- Website: Official website

Genazzano is a town and comune in the Metropolitan City of Rome, located on a tuff spur at 375 metres (1,230 ft) above sea level that, starting from the Monti Prenestini, ends on the Sacco River valley.

== History ==
The name originates from its role as vacation resort for the ancient Roman gens Genucia. In the fifth century, during the reign of Pope Sixtus III, the town of Genazzano contributed a large portion of its revenue for the Roman basilica of Santa Maria Maggiore. In the 11th century AD it was a fief of the Colonna family who, from their baronial Palace (castle), controlled the road from Naples to Rome. In the late fifteenth century, it became fief of the Borgia Family.

== Landmarks ==
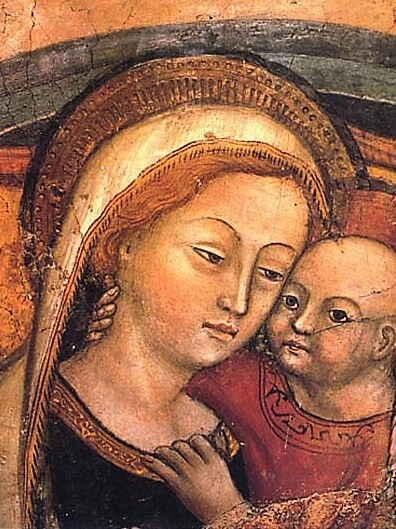
The Our Lady of Good Counsel original fresco from Genazzano.

The church of the Madonna del buon consiglio, built in appreciation for the town's contribution to Santa Maria Maggiore, and entrusted in 1356 to the Augustinian Order, holds the original fresco of Our Lady of Good Counsel (Latin: Mater boni consilii) a title given to the Blessed Virgin Mary, after the miraculous fresco. Measuring 40 by 45 centimetres (16 by 18 in), the image is executed on a thin layer of porcelain no thicker than an egg shell. Over the centuries, devotions to Our Lady of the Good Counsel grew among saints and Popes. More than any other pope, Leo XIII was deeply attached to this devotion. The small Scapular of Our Lady of Good Counsel (the White Scapular) was presented by the Hermits of St. Augustine to Pope Leo XIII, who, in December 1893, approved it and endowed it with indulgences. On 22 April 1903, that same Pope included the invocation "Mater boni consilii" in the Litany of Loreto. On 10 May 2025 Pope Leo XIV chose to visit the Shrine of the Mother of Good Counsel in Genazzano, for his first trip outside the Vatican.

At the southern end of the village, there is a Nymphaeum built at the dawn of the 16th century and attributed to Donato Bramante.

== Genazzano DOC ==
On the southern slopes of Monti Prenestini overlooking the Valle del Sacco is the Genazzano Denominazione di origine controllata (DOC) region that produces both red and white wines. The DOC red blend is composed of 70–90% Sangiovese, 10–30% Cesanese Comune and up to 20% of other local red grape varieties like Abbuoto. The DOC white wine is composed of 50–70% Malvasia di Candia, 10–30% each of Bellone and Bombino bianco and up to 40% of other local white grape varieties. Grapes destined for DOC wine production must be harvested to a yield no greater than 14 tonnes/hectare with the finished wines needing to attain a minimum alcohol level of at least 10.5% for the white wines and 11% for the reds.

== Famous people ==
- Genazzano is the birthplace of:
  - Pope Martin V (Oddone Colonna);
  - Vincenzo Vannutelli, cardinal;
  - Serafino Vannutelli, cardinal;
  - Scipione Vannutelli, etcher and painter;
- Death place of
  - Blessed Stephen Bellesini

== See also ==
- Genazzano FCJ College
