= Consiglio =

Consiglio may refer to:

- Consiglio di Rumo, frazione of the comune of Gravedona ed Uniti, province of Como, Lombardy, northern Italy
- Cyprian Consiglio, American composer, musician, Camaldolese monk and Catholic priest
- Douglas Consiglio, Canadian middle-distance runner
