= List of protected heritage sites in Seneffe =

This table shows an overview of the protected heritage sites in the Walloon town Seneffe. This list is part of Belgium's national heritage.

Object	Year/architect	Town/section	Address	Coordinates	Number^{?}	Image
Castle of Seneffe and some outbuildings and the ensemble of the castle, outbuildings, the surrounding park and the driveway to the castle ^{(nl)} ^{(fr)}		Seneffe		50.525525°N 4.271920°E	52063-CLT-0001-01 Info	Kasteel van Seneffe en bepaalde bijgebouwen en het ensemble van het kasteel, de bijgebouwen, het omliggende park en de oprijlaan naar het kasteel
Buisseret Castle and the surrounding area ^{(nl)} ^{(fr)}		Seneffe	rue Général Leman, n°17	50.527157°N 4.225050°E	52063-CLT-0003-01 Info	
Castle Espinette and environment ^{(nl)} ^{(fr)}		Seneffe	avenue de la Motte Baraffe n°2A	50.533335°N 4.256918°E	52063-CLT-0005-01 Info	
Godarville Tunnel, part of the old canal from Charleroi area, including the forest "le Bois de Bomerée" and the bridge "l'Origin" ^{(nl)} ^{(fr)}		Seneffe	rue du Pont de l'Origine	50.512273°N 4.269053°E	52063-CLT-0006-01 Info	
House "espagnole" or "salon de l'Alcazar": facade ^{(nl)} ^{(fr)}		Seneffe		50.567950°N 4.275427°E	52063-CLT-0007-01 Info	
Farm of the priory of Renissart: facades of the main building overlooking the garden ^{(nl)} ^{(fr)}		Seneffe	rue de Renissart n°9	50.544646°N 4.291560°E	52063-CLT-0008-01 Info	Boerderij van de priorij van Renissart: gevels van het hoofdgebouw met uitzicht op de tuin
Chapel Notre-Dame de Bon Conseil ^{(nl)} ^{(fr)}		Seneffe	rue de Bon Conseil	50.571289°N 4.283673°E	52063-CLT-0009-01 Info	
forest "Bois de l'Hôpital" ^{(nl)} ^{(fr)}		Seneffe		50.592154°N 4.263528°E	52063-CLT-0010-01 Info	
Metal swing bridge and the bridge over the old Charleroi-Brussels canal ^{(nl)} ^{(fr)}		Seneffe		50.566814°N 4.271338°E	52063-CLT-0011-01 Info	
Metal swing bridge and the bridge over the old Charleroi-Brussels canal ^{(nl)} ^{(fr)}		Seneffe		50.566915°N 4.274410°E	52063-CLT-0012-01 Info	
Church of Saint-Barthélemy and the ensemble of the church, the cemetery and the surrounding wall ^{(nl)} ^{(fr)}		Seneffe		50.522194°N 4.210894°E	52063-CLT-0013-01 Info	
Chapel Notre-Dame de Bon Secours ^{(nl)} ^{(fr)}	1641	Seneffe	chaussée de Marche	50.560575°N 4.234983°E	52063-CLT-0015-01 Info	Kapel Notre-Dame de Bon Secours
Church Sainte-Aldegonde: tower and stair tower ^{(nl)} ^{(fr)}		Seneffe		50.562442°N 4.251315°E	52063-CLT-0016-01 Info	
Church Sainte-Aldegonde: Extended classification of the entire building ^{(nl)} ^{(fr)}		Seneffe		50.562382°N 4.251161°E	52063-CLT-0017-01 Info	
Vieux Tilleul de l'Espinette or "La Cure" ^{(nl)} ^{(fr)}		Seneffe	rue Joseph Wauters	50.564472°N 4.251689°E	52063-CLT-0018-01 Info	
Castle: older parts of the castle and parts of modern renaissance castle ensemble formed by the property with the park, pond and canal ^{(nl)} ^{(fr)}		Seneffe	rue V. Rousseau, n°2	50.562070°N 4.252093°E	52063-CLT-0019-01 Info	
Castle "La Rocq" and its immediate surroundings ^{(nl)} ^{(fr)}		Seneffe		50.582236°N 4.252985°E	52063-CLT-0020-01 Info	Kasteel van "La Rocq" en zijn directe omgeving
St. Martin's Church ^{(nl)} ^{(fr)}		Seneffe		50.554070°N 4.313255°E	52063-CLT-0021-01 Info	
Rectory of the parish Saints Quirice et Julitte, garden and land between the wall and the road, chemin du Château de Buisseret ^{(nl)} ^{(fr)}		Seneffe		50.529192°N 4.256298°E	52063-CLT-0022-01 Info	
Forest Renissart ^{(nl)} ^{(fr)}		Seneffe		50.535280°N 4.306144°E	52063-CLT-0023-01 Info	
Forest of Arpes ^{(nl)} ^{(fr)}		Seneffe		50.577098°N 4.279806°E	52063-CLT-0024-01 Info	
Old canal Brussels-Charleroi and the environment in the section between the swing bridge of Arquennes and the castle park Rocq in Seneffe ^{(nl)} ^{(fr)}		Seneffe		50.582502°N 4.252934°E	52063-CLT-0027-01 Info	
Areas of the former canal Brussels-Charleroi between the bridge operator house in Seneffe and the old lock No. 14 ^{(nl)} ^{(fr)}		Seneffe		50.528346°N 4.259390°E	52063-CLT-0029-01 Info	
Chapel of Our Lady of Charity ^{(nl)} ^{(fr)}		Seneffe	rue de Scoumont, Obaix-Rosseignes	50.543628°N 4.310054°E	52063-CLT-0030-01 Info	
The castle and the theater and the ensemble formed by the said castle and its outbuildings, the park with ponds, and the driveway to the castle ^{(nl)} ^{(fr)}		Seneffe		50.525827°N 4.269665°E	52063-PEX-0001-01 Info	Het kasteel en het theater en het ensemble gevormd door de genoemde kasteel en de bijgebouwen, het park met vijvers, en de oprijlaan naar het kasteel

== See also ==
- List of protected heritage sites in Hainaut (province)
- Seneffe
