= Buon =

Buon is both a surname and a given name. Notable people with the surname include:

- Buon Tan (born 1967), French politician
- Tony Buon (born 1960), British workplace psychologist, speaker, mediator and author
