= Academy of Our Lady of Good Counsel =

Catholic girls high school in White Plains, New York, US

- Good Counsel Academy
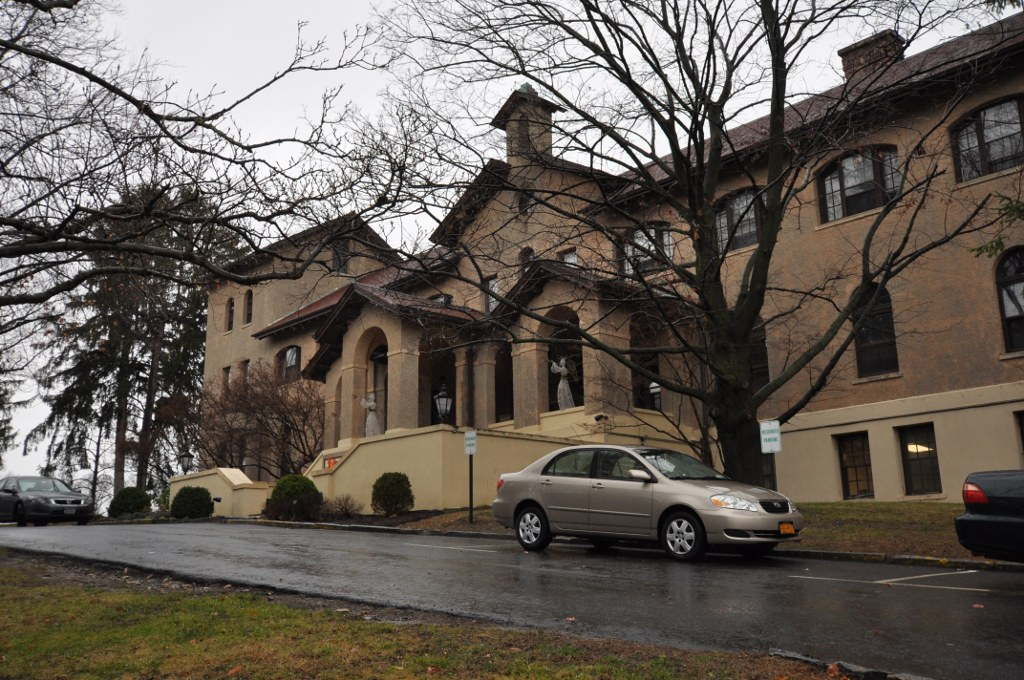

Location
- 52 North Broadway; White Plains, (Westchester County), New York 10603; United States
- 41°2′15″N 73°45′52″W

Information
- Type: Private, all-female
- Religious affiliation: Roman Catholic
- Established: 1922
- Closed: 2015
- Dean: Julie Kaen
- Principal: Sr. Laura Donovan
- Faculty: 37
- Grades: 9-12
- Student to teacher ratio: 11:1
- Colors: Blue and gold
- Slogan: Educating confident women, compassionate leaders. Academic Excellence!
- Mascot: Connie the Cougar
- Nickname: GCA
- Team name: Cougars
- Rival: Maria Regina High School
- Accreditation: Middle States Association of Colleges and Schools
- Publication: Maria (literary magazine)
- Newspaper: The Chit Chat
- Yearbook: Aloysian
- Tuition: $9,400
- Dean of Studies: Sr. M. Charlotte Brennan
- Admissions Director: Mary Anne Polistina
- Athletic Director: Maura Henderson Lynch
- Website: School website

Academy of Our Lady of Good Counsel was an all-girls, private, Roman Catholic high school in White Plains, New York, United States, within the Roman Catholic Archdiocese of New York.

The school provided clubs, athletic teams and special events. Good Counsel was honored by the United States Department of Education for its "outstanding progress in excellence in education."

== Background ==
The academy was established in 1922 by the Sisters of the Divine Compassion. For over a century, the Sisters of the Divine Compassion equipped generations with a love of learning and with skills based on Christian values.

Girls of diverse religions and cultures were accepted on an equal basis. Religious studies as well as a strong Christian way of life provided the background for the overall atmosphere of peace and compassion.

The school was housed in the Good Counsel Complex, which was added to the National Register of Historic Places in 1997.

In 2014 it was reported that the Sisters of the Divine Compassion were looking into selling the property, due to prohibitive costs for maintaining the old buildings. This announcement was received with outcry from the school's community of students, parents, and alum. Student protests took place in front of the grounds over the following months. In February 2015, the Sisters announced that the Academy of Our Lady of Good Counsel would close in July 2015. The sisters’ leadership team said, "multiple properties were investigated and eliminated as possible sites for relocation during this past year." The academy closed the following summer.

The Academy of Our Lady of Good Counsel Elementary School was scheduled to relocate and open in September 2015 at the former Holy Name of Jesus School in Valhalla, New York. Our Lady of Good Counsel Elementary School closed in 2017. The Good Counsel property on Broadway in White Plains was sold.
