= Madre del Buon Consiglio =

Church in Naples

The Basilica of the Crowned Mother of Good Counsel La Basilica della Incoronata Madre del Buon Consiglio
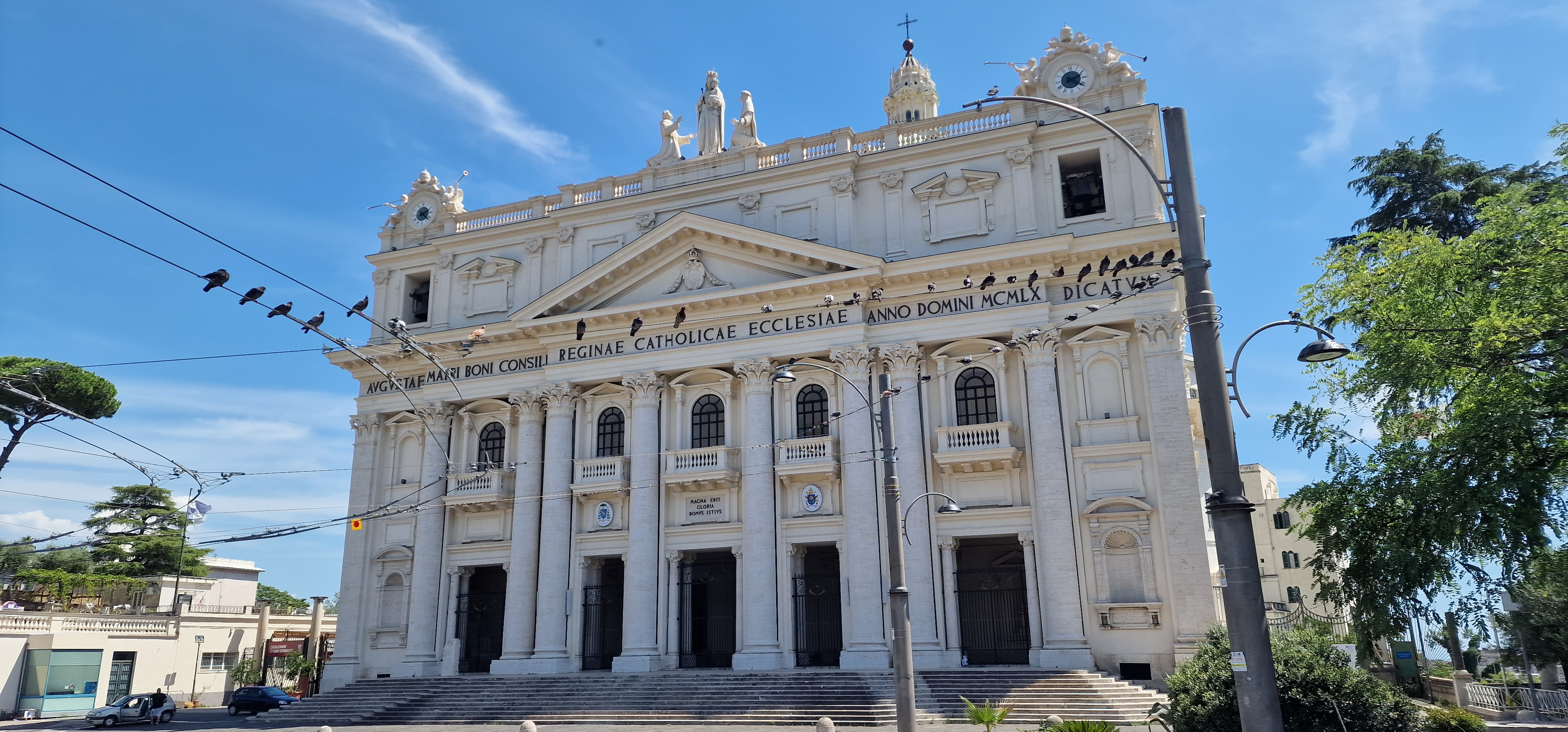
- Facade of the Basilica

Religion
- Affiliation: Roman Catholic
- Rite: Latin Rite
- Ecclesiastical or organisational status: Basilica
- Leadership: Pope Leo XIV
- Year consecrated: 1960
- Status: Active

Location
- Location: Naples
- Interactive map of The Basilica of the Crowned; Mother of Good Counsel; La Basilica della Incoronata; Madre del Buon Consiglio
- Coordinates: 40°51′52″N 14°14′49″E

Architecture
- Architect: Vincenzo Vecchio
- Type: Basilica
- Style: Renaissance and Baroque
- Groundbreaking: 1920
- Completed: 1960

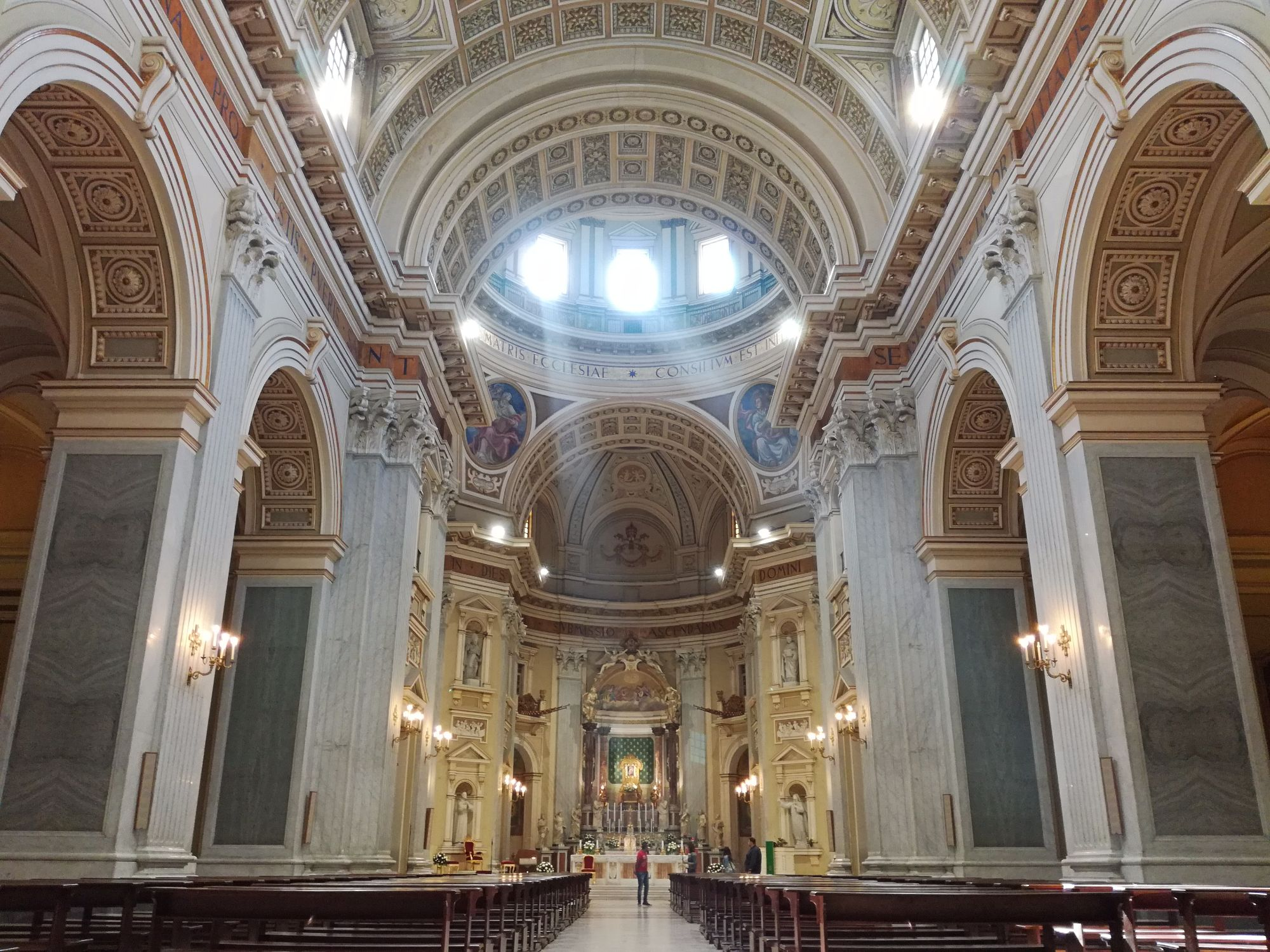
Interior of the Basilica.

The Basilica of the Crowned Mother of Good Counsel (Italian: Basilica della incoronata Madre del Buon Consiglio) is a Roman Catholic minor basilica located in Naples, southern Italy. It is dedicated to the Blessed Virgin Mary under the title of Our Lady of Good Counsel and is located on the hillside leading up to the Capodimonte palace. The shrine is built on top of the ancient Catacombs of San Gennaro and was rebuilt from 1920 to 1940, although construction continued until 1960.

Pope Pius X granted a Pontifical decree of canonical coronation to the enshrined Marian image on 29 March 1911. The rite of coronation was executed by the former Archbishop of Naples, Cardinal Giuseppe Antonio Ermenegildo Prisco on 6 January 1912.

Pope John Paul II raised the shrine to the status of Minor Basilica through the Pontifical decree Beatæ Mariæ Virginis on 2 January 1980. He later made an Apostolic Visit to this shrine in 21 October 1979 and 9 November 1990.

Pious devotees often refer to the ornate building as the “twin sister” of the highly similar Basilica of Saint Peter in Rome.

== History ==
The church has its roots in two miracles observed by local girl Maria di Gesù Landi (21 January 1861 – 26 March 1931). Known for her devotion to Our Lady of Good Counsel (Madonna del Buon Consiglio), she created a painting of the Virgin Mary in 1884. The image is credited by pious devotees for halting an outbreak of Cholera in the city in 1884. Twenty two years later, the same painting was credited for the clearance of the volcanic ash clouds from the eruption of Mount Vesuvius in April 1906.

The Roman architect, Vincenzo Vecchio designed the church in model of Saint Peter’s Basilica in Rome. The church was constructed between 1920 and 1940, on top of the ancient Catacombs of San Gennaro. It has become the destination of pilgrimages in the name of Maria di Gesù Landi.

The 1980 Irpinia earthquake toppled the finial head of the statue of the Madonna from the top of the church to the ground, where it crashed and lay inexplicably undamaged and claimed to be miraculous by its devotees.
