= Good Counsel Complex =

- U.S. National Register of Historic Places
- U.S. Historic district
- New York State Register of Historic Places
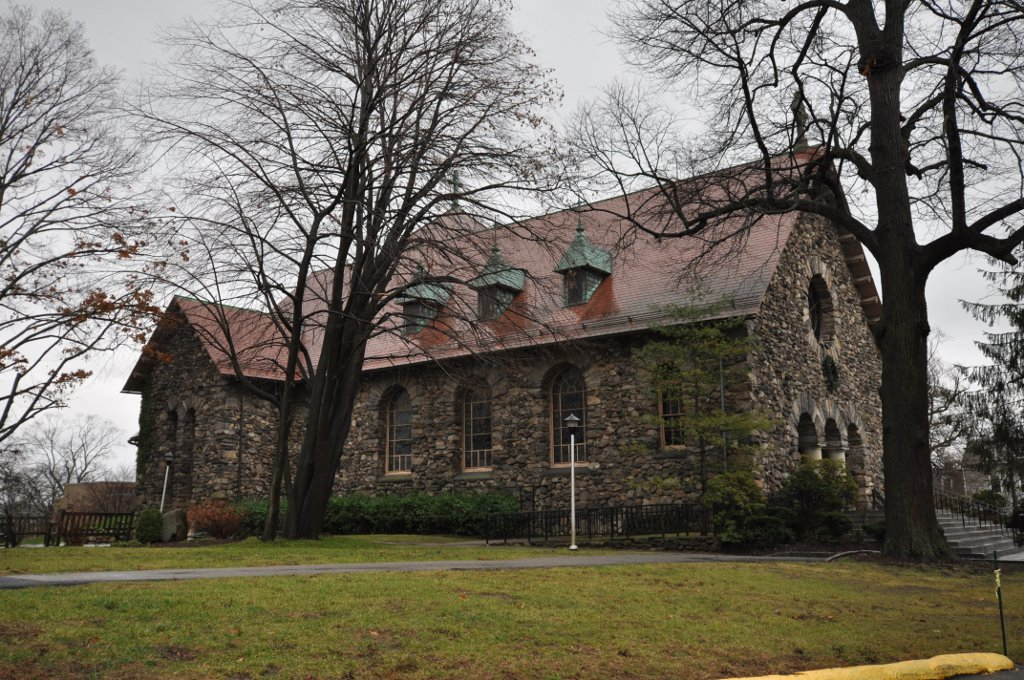

- Location within New York Location within the United States
- Location: 52 N. Broadway, White Plains, New York
- Coordinates: 41°2′21″N 73°45′52″W
- Area: 13 acres (5.3 ha)
- Built: 1856
- Architect: O'Conner, Lawrence
- Architectural style: Mission/Spanish Revival, Italianate
- NRHP reference No.: 97000358
- NYSRHP No.: 11943.000755

Significant dates
- Added to NRHP: April 25, 1997
- Designated NYSRHP: January 14, 1997

Good Counsel Complex, also known as Convent of the Sisters of the Divine Compassion, is a national historic district located at White Plains, Westchester County, New York. The district consists of 10 contributing buildings, including the separately listed Mapleton. In addition to Mapleton, contributing buildings in the complex includes the convent (1908, 1923 additions), chapel (1897), House of Nazareth (1891), cooking school / infirmary (1901-1902), heating plant / workshop (1898), Tilford House (1856), St. Ann's Cottage (1901), and carriage house / stable (1890). The buildings include regionally significant examples of Romanesque Revival and Mediterranean Revival inspired architecture. The buildings housed the Academy of Our Lady of Good Counsel which closed in 2015 after the complex was sold. Parts of the complex were sold to Pace University School of Law in 1975. The Sisters continue to maintain a presence on the complex grounds.

It was added to the National Register of Historic Places in 1997.

== See also ==
- National Register of Historic Places listings in southern Westchester County, New York
