= Our Lady of Good Counsel =

Miraculous painting

Our Mother of Good Counsel Mater Boni Consilii
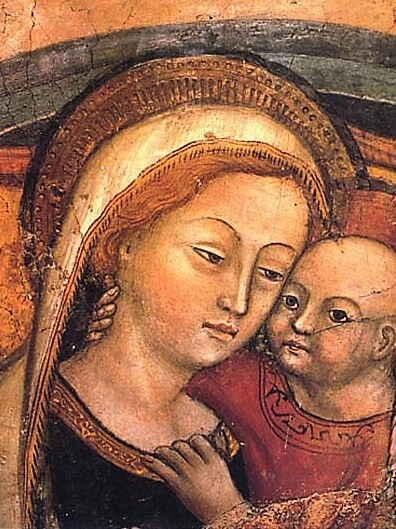
- Location: Genazzano, Italy
- Date: c. 1417-1431; 606-591 years ago
- Witness: Gentile da Fabriano; Petruccia da Nocera
- Type: Fresco and Plaster
- Approval: Pope Innocent XI
- Shrine: Basilica of Gennazano (1356)
- Patronage: Republic of Albania; The Missionary Sisters of Saint Peter Claver, Augustinian Province of Midwest U.S. Diocese of Parañaque, Philippines; Diocese of Essen, Germany; Mother of Good Counsel Seminary
- Attributes: Madonna and Child in tender embrace
- Feast day: 25—26 April

Our Mother of Good Counsel (Latin: Mater Boni Consilii) formerly known as Our Lady of Paradise (Latin: Domina Nostra Paradisi) is a Roman Catholic title of the Blessed Virgin Mary associated with a purported miraculous painting of the Madonna and Child enshrined within the Minor Basilica at Genazzano, Italy.

Pope Innocent XI granted a Pontifical decree of coronation to the image on 17 November 1682. The fresco image was reputedly painted by the Roman artisan Gentile da Fabriano and measures 40 to 45 centimetres (16 to 18 in) on a thin layer of plaster.

Over the centuries, devotions to this Marian title became widespread among Roman Pontiffs and Catholic saints, later added to the Litany of Loreto via the Pontifical decree Ex Quo Beatissima in 1903. The Rosary Pope raised her shrine to the status of Minor Basilica in the same year whilst the feast day is of the image is on 25—26 April.

== History ==
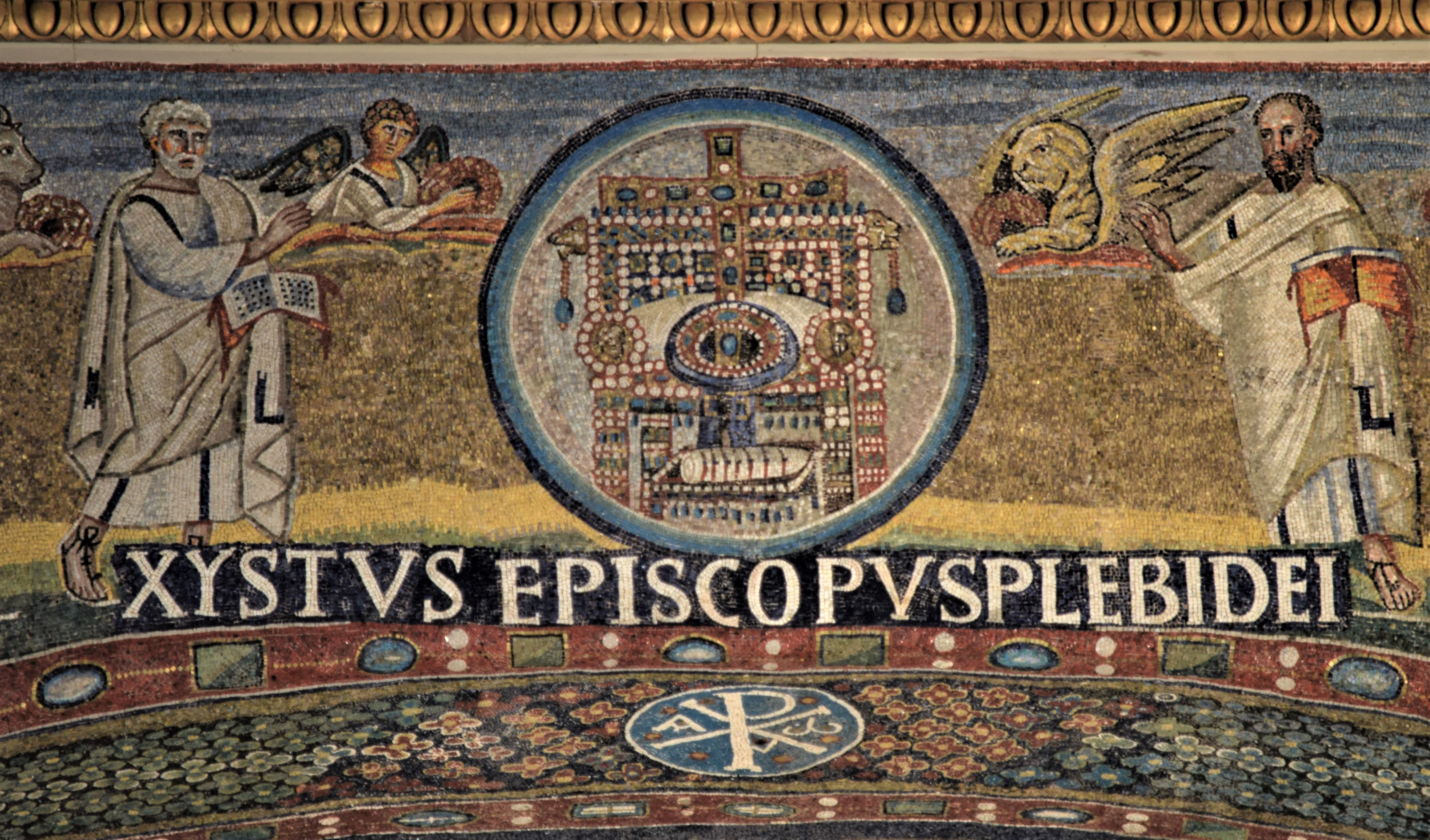
Memorial mosaic of Pope Sixtus III at the Basilica of Saint Mary the Great, circa 435

During the reign of Pope Sixtus III in the fifth century, the town of Genazzano, about 48 kilometres (30 mi) south of Rome, had contributed a large portion of its revenue for the Roman basilica now known as Saint Mary the Great. In appreciation, a church, called Santa Maria, was built in Genazzano and was later entrusted by Prince Pietro Giordano of the Royal House of Colonna to the Augustinian Order in 27 December 1356 via notarized decree.

The Genazzano church became a popular place of pilgrimage. Numerous cures were said to take place there. The Augustinian friars were invited to minister to the spiritual needs of the pilgrims. They continue to serve there to this day.

== Cult of the Blessed Virgin Mary ==
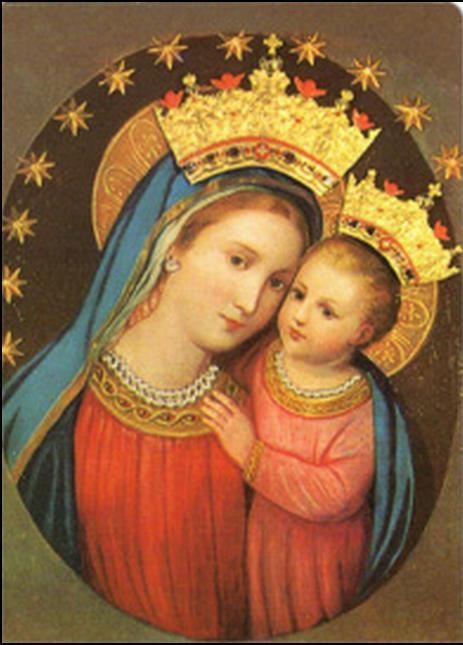
Our Lady of Good Counsel (1906) venerated in Naples, Italy.

According to pious tradition documented by the Prior General of the Augustinian Order, Ambrogio Massari, published in his culminated work, Defensorium Ordinis Fratrum Heremitarum Sancti Augustini Responsivium ad Maledicta Canonicorum Assertorum Regularium Congregationnis Frisonariæ (Section: Chronica, 1482), that the miraculous event had occurred in the year 1467.

The local convent was in dire need of repair and a local widow without any children (aged 39), Petruccia da Nocera (also known as Petruccia de Geneo) (1428–1470) sold her house and material possessions. She was known for piety and was dedicated to the restoration project, but ran out of construction funds before the task was completed.

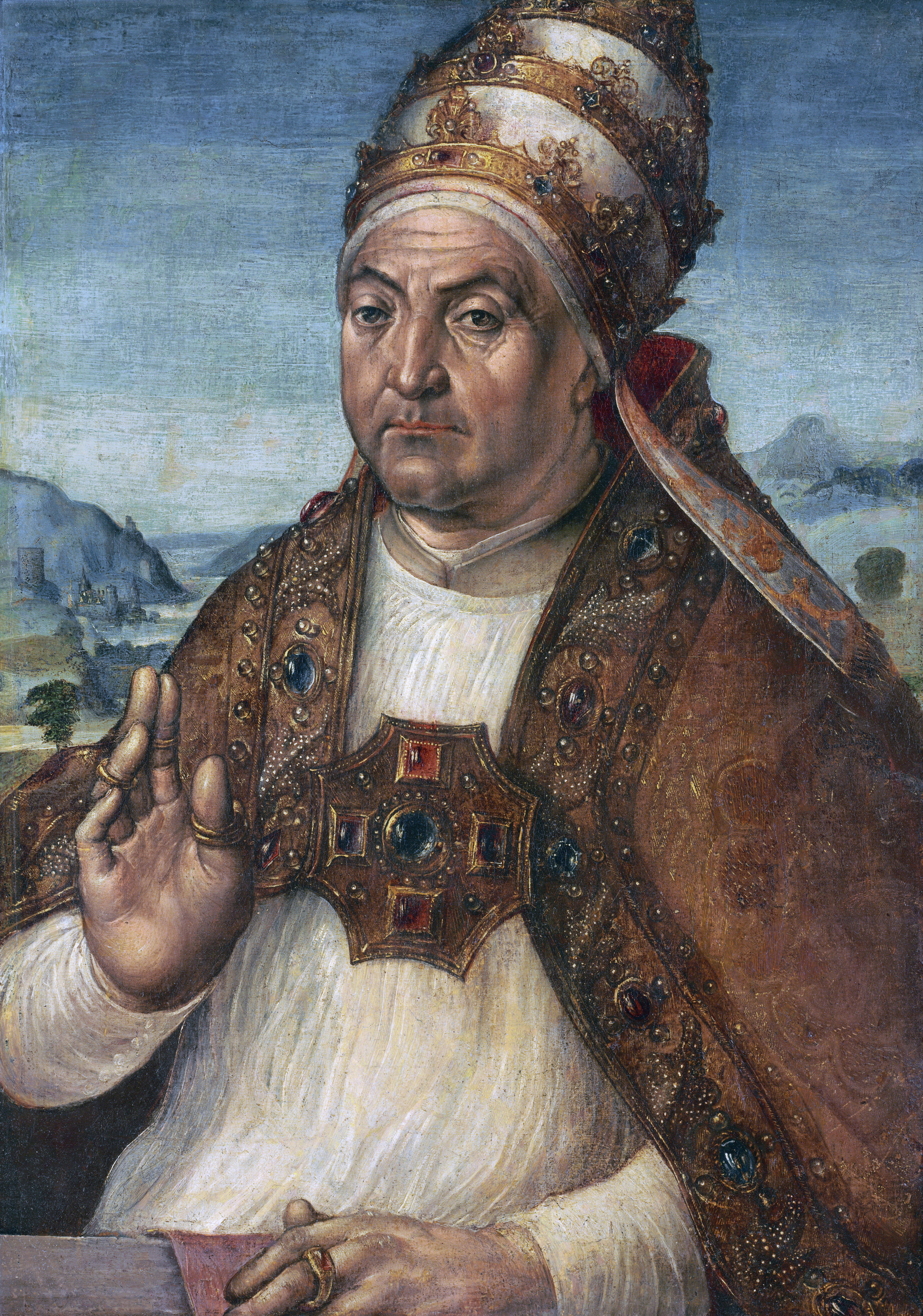
Pope Sixtus IV (1414–1484) who led a Holy Inquisition into the growing miraculous claims at the site in 1482. Oil on Canvas by Pedro Berruguete. The Cleveland Museum of Art.

Due to this failure, Petruccia was greatly mocked by the local townspeople for which she requested a miracle from Heaven. In the midst of the festivities for the feast of Saint Mark the Evangelist, the townsfolk suddenly heard "heavenly music." A mysterious cloud was then said to have descended on the unfinished wall of the parish church. In front of the people, the cloud dissipated and a beautiful fresco, no thicker than a carte-de-visite and no more than eighteen inches square, of the Virgin Mary and the Christ Child was revealed. It was widely believed that it had been miraculously transported by angelic beings from a church in Shkodër, Albania just prior to its invasion by the Ottomans. This work was presented to Pope Sixtus IV who led a scrutinized investigation to the miraculous claims.

Petruccia da Nocera died in 1470 (aged 42) and her mortal remains were interred in the capped niche above the Marian image until 1734. Because the Marian image was already considered "low" at the eye—level of the faithful, it would be impious to place anything above the venerated image. Therefore, the Augustinian Order elected to transfer her mortal remains to the backside of the altar in 1882, where they remain for public veneration today. She also has the localized title of Blessed due to her association to the site.

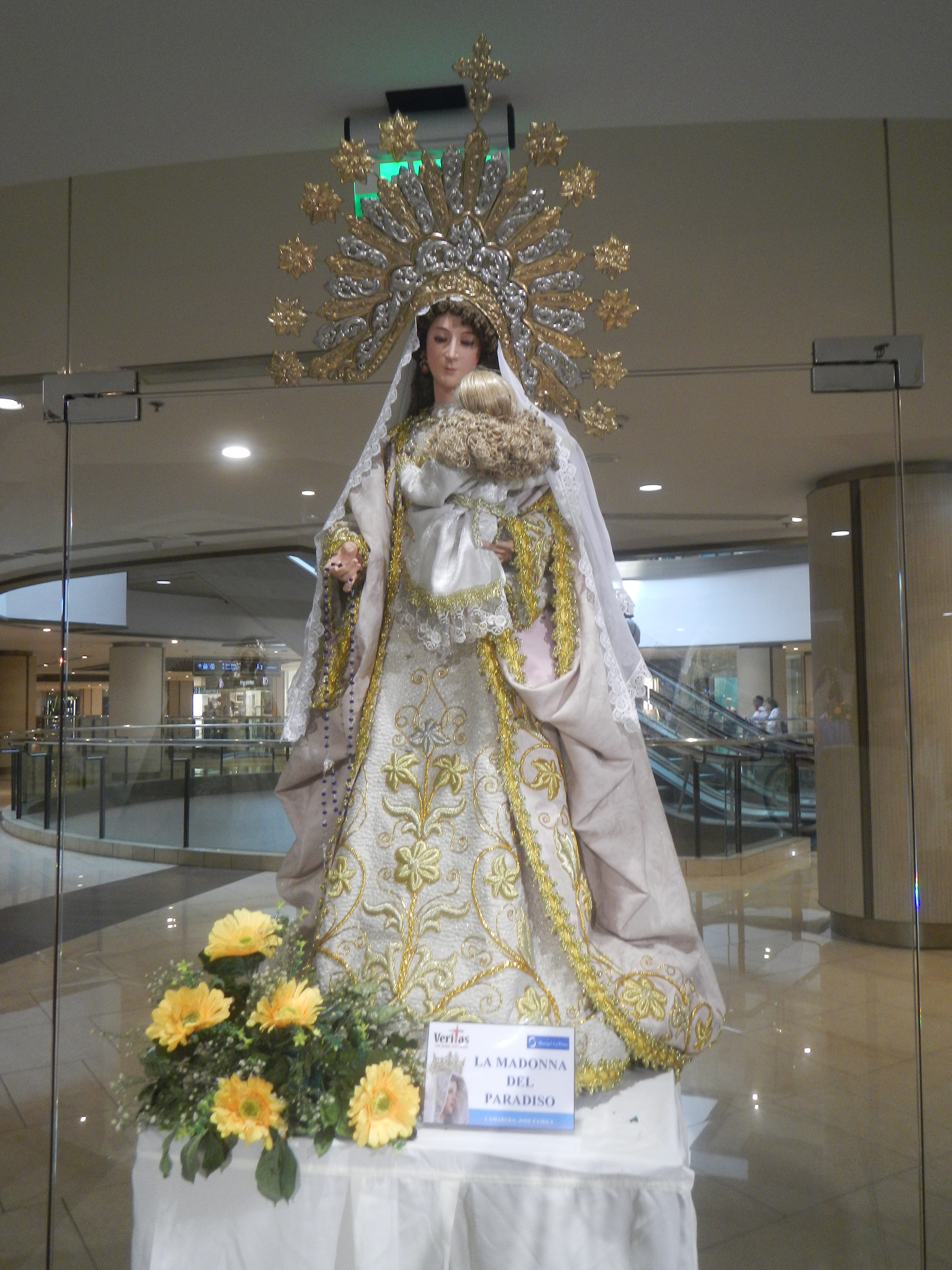
An image of Our Lady of Paradise, using the former title of the devotion, in Manila, Philippines

The image was originally called "La Madonna del Paradiso" and now known as "Madonna del Buon Consiglio" (English: Our Lady of Good Counsel). Among her noted devotees have been Saints Aloysius Gonzaga, Alphonsus Liguori, Don Bosco, and Blessed Stephen Bellesini.

Medieval art experts consulted during a restoration conducted between 1957 and 1959 suggest that the image of the Madonna was once part of a larger fresco that covered the wall and was subsequently covered over with plaster. They believe the fresco is likely the work of the early fifteenth century artist Gentile da Fabriano, probably painted around the time of Pope Martin V (1417–1431).

== Pontifical approbations ==
The white scapular of Our Lady of Good Counsel as authorized by the Sacred Congregation of Rites

Several Pontiffs have venerated Our Lady under this title:

- Pope Pius V gifted a heart shaped Ex Voto to the shrine in 1571 in honor of the Battle of Lepanto, still preserved at the site.
- Pope Urban VIII made a pilgrimage to the Gennazano shrine on 21 October 1630 due to the Roman plague at the time.
- Pope Clement XII granted Plenary indulgences to pious Catholics who visit the shrine on 25 April, the original feast date of its Marian apparition.
- Pope Innocent XI granted a Pontifical decree of canonical coronation to the image on 17 November 1682. The rite of coronation was executed on 25 November 1682.
- Pope Benedict XIII established an Office of Catholic Mass under this title for the priests of Gennazano locality on 10 April 1727 in the form of a Papal indult, retaining them the original privilege to celebrate on 25 April, while others must move the feast date to 26 April (to avoid conflict with the Feast of Saint Mark the Evangelist).
- Pope Benedict XIV granted the former Church of Saint Pantaleon in Monti, Rione to the Archconfraternity of Our Lady of Good Counsel in 1748 who renamed it to their own. Today it is converted into a charity shelter house for the Comboni Missionaries of the Heart of Jesus assisting foreign migrants and refugees.
  - Issued the Pontifical decree Iniunctæ Nobis Licet on 2 July 1753 which established the "Pious Union of Our Lady of Good Counsel".
- Pope Pius VI finally approved the cultus of documents In Festo Apparitionis Sacræ immaginis from the first submission of the In Memoriam Prodigiosæ Apparitionis (suppressed) by the Augustinian promoter—priests, Angelo Maria de Orgio and Pietro Paolo Ferrocci. The Pontifical approbation was finally granted through the former Prefect of the Sacred Congregation of Rites, Cardinal Giovanni Archinto who notarized the decree.
  - Ultimately established a renewed Office of Catholic Mass under this devotional title for the Augustinian Order on 18 December 1779.
- Pope Pius IX made the following Apostolic visits
  - Visited the Sanctuary of Madre del Buon Consiglio in Naples on 16 September 1849.
  - Visited the Genezzano shrine on 15 August 1864, accompanied by the former Papal Antechamber, the Augustinian Bishop Francesco Marinelli.

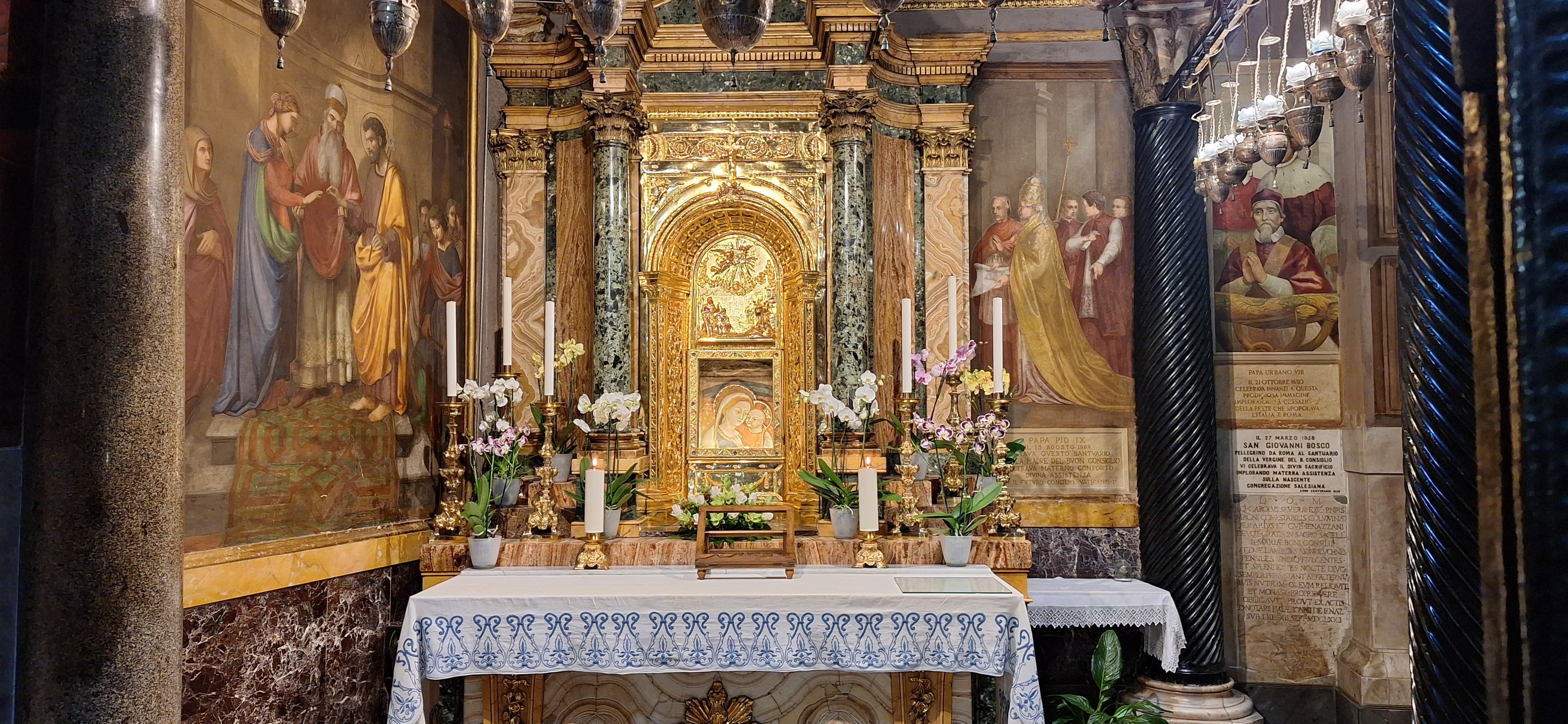
The altar of Genezzano, with the original fresco permanently secured.

- Pope Leo XIII was a member of the pious union and granted the following Pontifical decrees:
  - Renewed a new set of Office of Catholic Mass for the Augustinian Order on 18 December 1884.
  - Memorialized the motto Fili Acquisce Consiliis Eius for the (formerly) exclusive scapular on 21 December 1893 during a private audience with the Superior General of the Hermits of Saint Augustine.
  - Issued the Pontifical decree Sacris Ædibus Deo which raised the shrine of Genezanno to the status of Minor Basilica on 17 March 1903.
  - Issued a Pontifical decree titled Ex Quo Beatissima on 22 April 1903 which canonically added the title Mater Boni Consilii in the Litany of Loreto.
- Pope Pius X granted a Pontifical decree of canonical coronation to the Marian image of Madre del Buon Consiglio in Naples on 29 March 1911. The rite of coronation was executed by the former Archbishop of Naples, Cardinal Giuseppe Antonio Ermenegildo Prisco on 6 January 1912.
- Pope Pius XII composed a devotional prayer to this title in 1939 and later composed a Novena prayer published by the Sacred Congregation of Rites on 23 January 1953.
- Pope John XXIII issued a Pontifical decree titled Essendiæ in Urbe assigning this title to the Golden Madonna of Essen and the official Patroness of the Diocese of Essen on 8 July 1959.
  - Visited the Genazzano shrine on 25 August 1959.
- Pope John Paul II issued the following decrees:
  - Granted the Pontifical decree Beatæ Mariæ Virginis which raised the shrine of Madre del Buon Consiglio in Naples to the status of Minor Basilica on 2 January 1980. He later made an Apostolic Visit to this shrine on 21 October 1979 and 9 November 1990.
  - Visited the Gennazano shrine on 22 April 1993.
  - Visited the Sanctuary of Our Lady of Good Counsel in the Republic of Albania on its feast day, 25 April 1993.

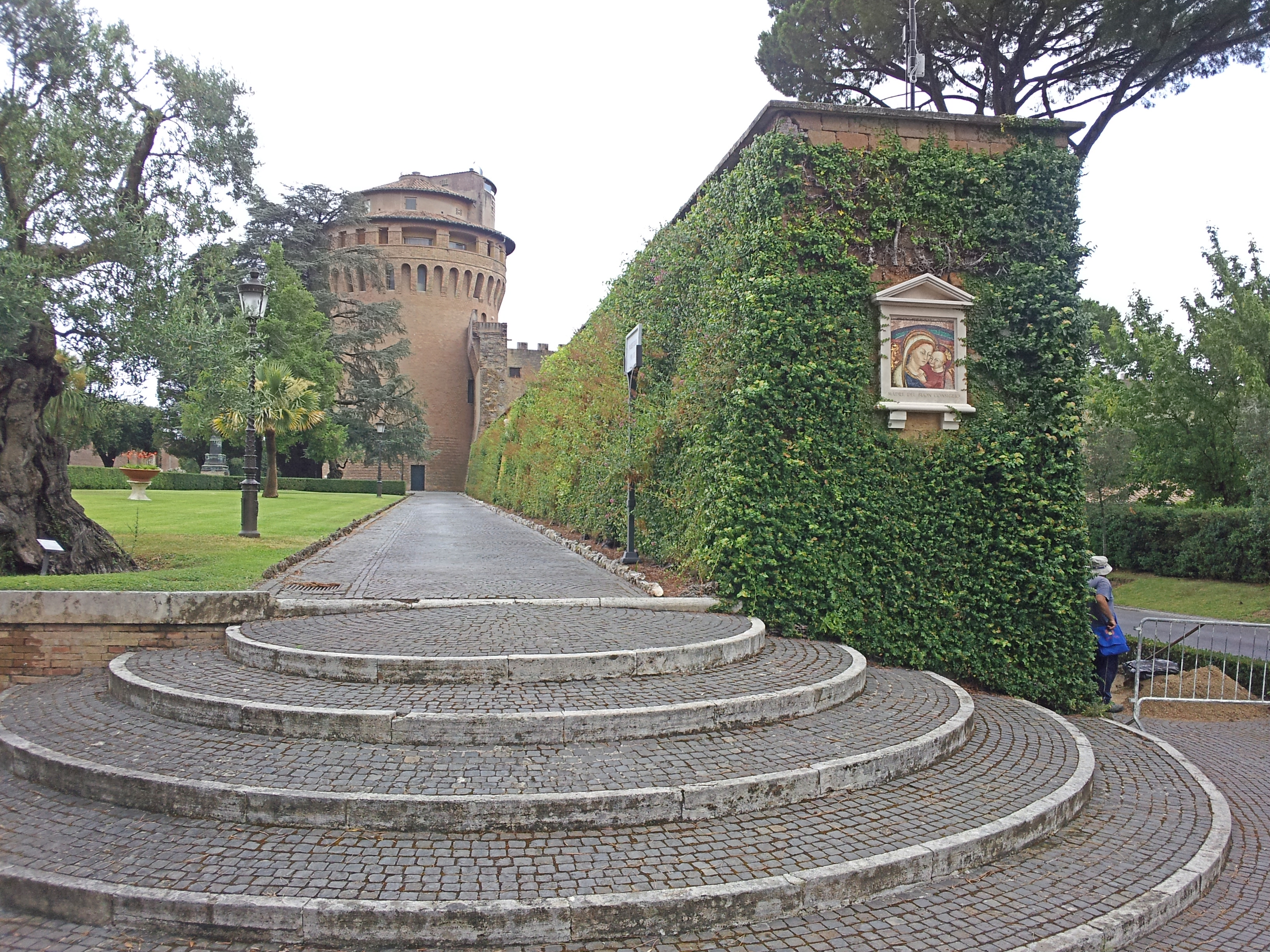
The mosaic image of the title installed at the Vatican Gardens in 2009 at the decree of Pope Benedict XVI

- Pope Benedict XVI granted several Pontifical decrees for the following:
  - As Prefect of the Holy Office, Cardinal Joseph Ratzinger officiated a Catholic Mass at the shrine on 26 September 2000.
  - Made an Apostolic Visit to the Basilica of Madre del Buon Consiglio in Naples on 21 October 2007.
  - Issued the decree authorizing the installation of the mosaic image in the Vatican Gardens on 9 July 2009. The event was attended by the Pontiff in person while the rite of installation was executed by the former President of the Governorate of Vatican City State, Cardinal Giovanni Lajolo and also attended by the former Prior General of the Augustinian Order, Robert Francis Prevost.
  - Issued a Pontifical decree on 13 June 2012 declaring Our Lady of Good Counsel as patroness of Gennazano. The decree was notarized by the Holy Office.
  - The same Pontiff considered transferring the original image to the Pauline Chapel of the Apostolic Palace, as was desired by Pope Pius IX and Pope Leo XIII (according to Papal correspondences discovered within the Vatican Secret Archives in 2011) but later decided against it.
- Pope Francis made an Apostolic visit to the Basilica of Madre del Buon Consiglio on 21 March 2015 and 21 June 2019.
  - Invoked the title during his Regina Caeli speech address on 3 May 2020.
  - Issued a Pontifical decree which raised the Sanctuary of Our Lady of Good Counsel to the status of a Minor Basilica in Shkoder, Albania on 22 April 2024.
- Pope Leo XIV visited the Gennazano shrine on 10 May 2025.

== The White Scapular ==
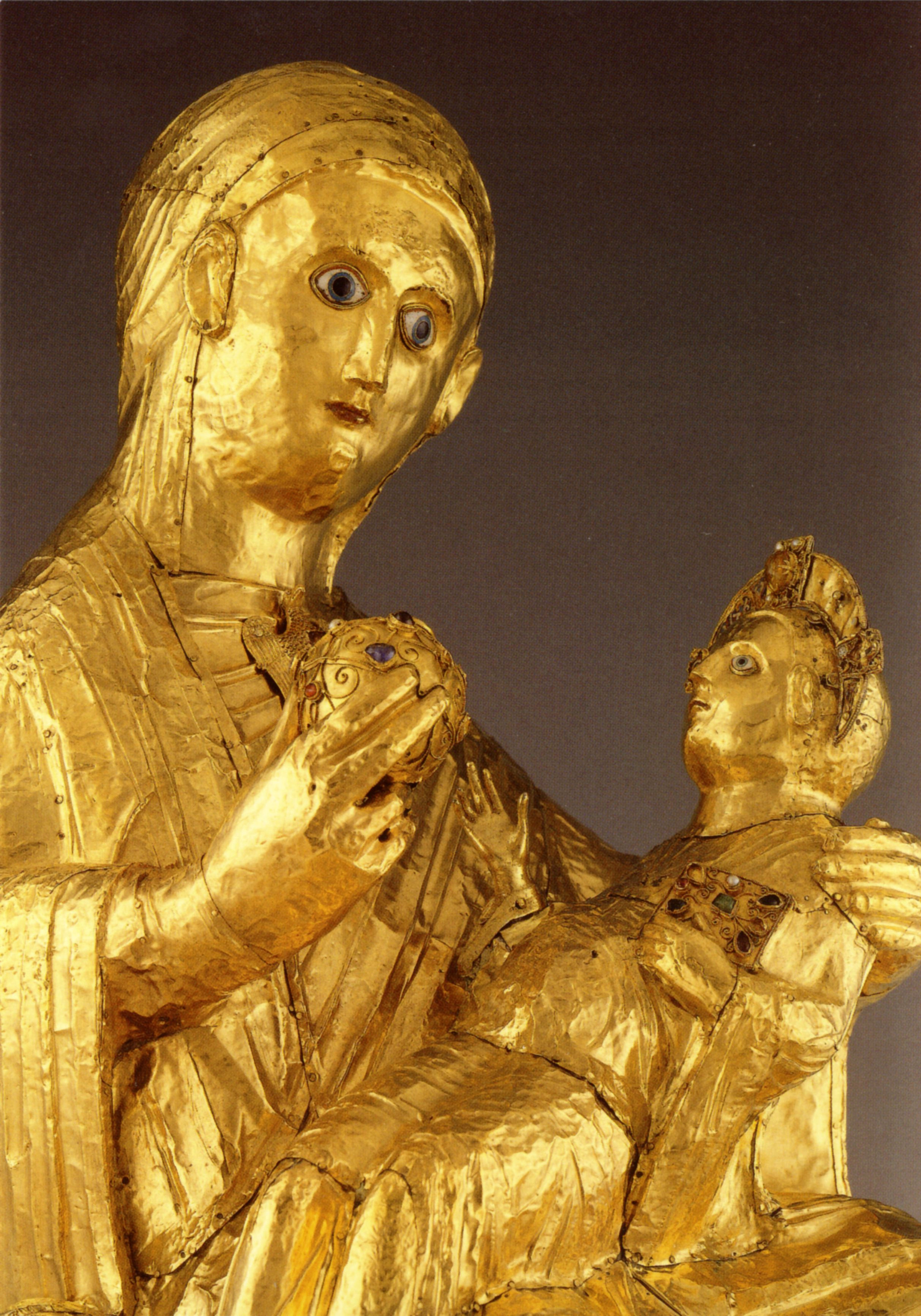
The golden image of Our Mother of Good Counsel (980), the oldest sculpted depiction in the Essen Cathedral, Germany

A religious sacramental called "the small scapular of Our Lady of Good Counsel" ("the white scapular") was presented by the Hermits of Saint Augustine to Pope Leo XIII on 19 December 1893, approved it on 21 December and endowed it with indulgences in a decree of the Sacred Congregation of Rites. The sacramental was previously restricted to the Augustinian Order by special privilege, but now democratized for all Catholic priests regardless of Order affiliation since the Second Vatican Council.

On the front panel of the sacramental (to be made of white wool) is the image of the fresco of Our Lady of Good Counsel, with the inscription, Mater boni consilii [ora pro nobis]. On the second segment is found the papal coat-of-arms, which includes the Triple Tiara and the Keys of Heaven, with the words of Leo XIII: "Fili acquisce consiliis ejus" ("Child, listen to her counsels").

== Patronage ==
Our Lady of Good Counsel is the Patroness of the following:

- Republic of Albania
- Mother of Good Counsel Seminary of the Philippines
- Missionary Sisters of Saint Peter Claver of North America
- National Council of Catholic Women of America
- Catholic Women's League of Canada
- The "Midwest Augustinians" in Chicago, United States
- Diocese of Paranaque in Manila, Philippines
- Diocese of Essen in the Ruhr, Germany
  - The Essen Cathedral's statue of Mary is considered to be the oldest fully sculpted depiction of the Madonna and Child Jesus.
- Istituto Mater Boni Consilii, a Traditionalist Catholic sect that rejects the modern Papacy in Rome.
- Buonconsiglio Castle, the former house of the Bishopric of Trent of the Holy Roman Empire since the 9th century.

== See also ==
- Marian art in the Catholic Church

== Bibliography ==
- The Virgin Mother of Good Counsel, by George F. Dillon, M. H. Gill and Son, 1888.
- The Mother of Good Counsel of Genazzano, by João S. Clá Dias, Western Hemisphere Cultural Society, Inc, 1992. ISBN 1-881008-03-7
- Miraculous Images of Our Lady, by Joan Carroll Cruz, OCDS, TAN Books and Publishers, Inc, 1993. ISBN 0-89555-484-4
