= List of former state routes in New York (101–200) =

This section of the list of former state routes in New York contains all routes numbered between 101 and 200.

Route	Southern or western terminus	Northern or eastern terminus	Formed	Removed
NY 104 (early 1930s)	Atlantic Beach Bridge in Lawrence	NY 27 in Queens	early 1930s	by 1932
NY 104 (1932-1936)	NY 137 in Pound Ridge	CT 29 at the Connecticut state line at Pound Ridge	ca. 1932	ca. 1936
NY 113 (1930-1972)	NY 27 in Quogue	NY 24 in Riverhead	1930	1972
NY 115 (1932-1970s)	Merrick Road in Wantagh	NY 107 in Bethpage	ca. 1932	early 1970s
NY 119A	US 1 in Rye	NY 119 / NY 120 in Harrison	ca. 1939	1960
NY 120B	NY 120 in Rye	NY 120 in North Castle	early 1930s	ca. 1939
NY 122 (1931-1934)	NY 129 at Croton Reservoir	US 9 in Peekskill	ca. 1931	1934
NY 126 (1930-1936)	US 1 in Mamaroneck	NY 125 in White Plains	1930	ca. 1936
NY 126 (1940-1972)	I-81 / US 104 in Mexico	NY 13 in Williamstown	ca. 1940	ca. 1972
NY 130 (1930-1938)	US 6 in Peekskill	NY 301 in Kent	1930	ca. 1938
NY 131 (1930-mid-1940s)	NY 129 in Cortlandt	NY 129 in Yorktown	ca. 1931	mid-1940s
NY 132A	Dead end in Yorktown	US 202 / NY 35 in Yorktown	1930	early 1970s
NY 135 (1930-1935)	NY 134 in Ossining	NY 134 in Yorktown	1930	ca. 1935
NY 135 (1937-1939)	US 20 / NY 5 in Aurelius	NY 5 in Sennett	ca. 1937	ca. 1939
NY 136 (1931-1938)	NY 22 in North Castle	Connecticut state line	ca. 1931	ca. 1938
NY 137A	NY 137 in Pound Ridge	Connecticut state line at Pound Ridge	1930	ca. 1932
NY 140 (1932-1936)	NY 131 at Croton Reservoir	NY 132A at FDR State Park	ca. 1932	ca. 1936
NY 142 (1931-1938)	NY 100 in Mount Pleasant	NY 100 in Hawthorne	ca. 1931	ca. 1938
NY 146B	NY 146 in Clifton Park	Miller and Sugarhill Roads in Clifton Park	ca. 1932	ca. 1965
NY 146C	NY 7 in Rotterdam	NY 146 in Rotterdam	mid-1930s	ca. 1962
NY 148 (1930-1960)	NY 7 in Schoharie	NY 30 in Mayfield	1930	1960
NY 152	US 4 / NY 43 in North Greenbush	NY 150 in Sand Lake	1930	1980
NY 153 (1932-1940s)	NY 154 in Poestenkill	NY 2 in Brunswick	ca. 1932	early 1940s
NY 153 (1962-early 1980s)	NY 22 in Salem	VT 153 at the Vermont state line at Salem	ca. 1962	early 1980s
NY 154	NY 66 in Troy	Rensselaer CR 77 in Poestenkill	ca. 1932	1980
NY 161A	NY 161 in Florida	NY 30 in Florida	ca. 1931	ca. 1938
NY 164 (1930-1940)	NY 10 in Cobleskill	US 20 in Sharon	1930	ca. 1940
NY 164 (1940-1960s)	US 9 / NY 9A in Yonkers	US 1 in The Bronx	ca. 1940	1960s
NY 179 (1930-1963)	NY 3 in Hounsfield	NY 12 / NY 12E in Clayton	1930	ca. 1963
NY 181 (1930-1939)	NY 12 in Clayton	NY 37 in Theresa	1930	ca. 1939
NY 181 (1960-1963)	NY 12 in Pamelia	NY 3 in Black River	1960	ca. 1963
NY 182 (1933-1935)	NY 3D at Palermo	US 11 in Hastings	ca. 1933	1935
NY 182 (1935-1939)	US 11 in Hastings	NY 49 in Constantia	1935	ca. 1939
NY 185 (1930s-1980)	NY 37 in Hammond	Brasie Corners – Rossie Road in Rossie	ca. 1931	1980
NY 186 (1931-1982)	NY 812 in De Kalb	NY 68 in Canton	ca. 1931	1982
NY 187 (1930-1938)	NY 11B in Lawrence	NY 30 in Malone	1930	ca. 1938
NY 188 (1930-1939)	NY 37 in Westville	US 11 in Burke	1930	ca. 1939
NY 188 (1969-1970)	NY 17 in Owego	NY 17 / NY 26 in Vestal	1969	1970
NY 191	NY 22 in Chazy	US 9 in Chazy	1930	2015
NY 192	NY 30 in Brighton	NY 86 in Harrietstown	1930	1989
NY 192A	NY 86 in Harrietstown	NY 192 in Brighton	early 1950s	1980
NY 194	NY 177 in Pinckney	NY 12 in Copenhagen	1930	1980
NY 195 (1930-1936)	US 9 in Elizabethtown	NY 22 in Westport	1930	1936
NY 195	NY 11B in Lawrence	US 11 in Lawrence	ca. 1938	1980
NY 198 (1932-1940s)	NY 33A / NY 251 in Chili	NY 383 in Chili	ca. 1932	1949
NY 200 (1930-early 1940s)	US 44 / NY 22 in Amenia	CT 343 at the Connecticut state line at Amenia	1930	early 1940s
