= List of county routes in Westchester County, New York =

County routes in Westchester County, New York, are maintained by the Westchester County highway department. They provide additional interconnections between state highways within the county. Some portions of state highways in Lower Westchester County are county-maintained and thus also carry county route designations. Additionally, actions relating to planning and zoning along some former county roads are still subject to review by the Westchester County Planning Board, and these roads still carry their county route numbers for inventory purposes. The vast majority (if not all) of county routes in Westchester County are unsigned.

== Routes 1–100 ==
Route	Length (mi)	Length (km)	From	Via	To	Notes
CR 2	0.66	1.06	Bronx River Parkway	Brook Street in Eastchester	NY 22	
CR 3	3.46	5.57	Connecticut state line at Pound Ridge (becomes Route 104)	Long Ridge Road	NY 172 in town of Bedford	Formerly continued west to NY 22
CR 4	1.02	1.64	Grandview Avenue	Washington Avenue in Pleasantville	CR 79 at Pleasantville–New Castle village/town line	
CR 5	0.34	0.55	CR 21 at NY 133 in New Castle	Seven Bridges Road	NY 100 in Yorktown	
CR 7 (Note: Comprises CR 7 and CR 7A.)	0.41	0.66	Croton Point Park entrance	Croton Point Avenue in Croton-on-Hudson	NY 9A	
CR 8 (Note: Comprises CR 8, CR 8A, CR 8B, CR 8C, and CR 8D.)	5.09	8.19	Mount Pleasant Avenue (CR 44) in village of Mamaroneck	Mamaroneck Avenue	Bryant Avenue in White Plains	Formerly part of NY 126 from 1930 to c. 1936
CR 9	0.57	0.92	CR 33II at Mile Square Road	Palmer Road in Yonkers	CR 33I at NY 100	Connects to NY 100 via CR 47IIA
CR 12	3.52	5.66	CR 56 at Middle Patent Road in North Castle	Bedford–Banksville Road and Greenwich Road	NY 22 in Bedford Village	
CR 14A	0.47	0.76	NY 448	Weber Avenue in Sleepy Hollow	Sleepy Hollow Road	
CR 15 (Note: Comprises CR 15 and CR 15II.)	0.85	1.37	US 9 in Tarrytown	Benedict Avenue	NY 119 in Greenburgh	
CR 18 (Note: Comprises CR 18 and CR 18A.)	3.21	5.17	Westchester Avenue (CR 62) in Harrison	Anderson Hill Road	NY 120A at the Connecticut state line in Rye Brook	
CR 19	0.22	0.35	NY 9A	Ryder Road in village of Ossining	CR 1323 at Sunset Drive east junction	
CR 21	1.52	2.45	NY 120	Seven Bridges Road in New Castle	CR 5 at NY 133	
CR 22	1.17	1.88	NY 128	Lexington Avenue in Mount Kisco	Lieto Drive	
CR 24	1.36	2.19	North Division Street (CR 63) / South Street (CR 63II)	South Division Street and Crompond Road in Peekskill	US 202 / NY 35 at Peekskill–Cortlandt city/town line	Mostly overlaps US 202 and NY 35
CR 25 (Note: Comprises CR 25 and CR 25I.)	2.27	3.65	US 6 / US 9 / US 202	Main Street in Peekskill	US 6 at Peekskill–Cortlandt city/town line	Entire length overlaps with US 6
CR 26	1.79	2.88	NY 125 at Scarsdale–White Plains town/city line	Old Mamaroneck Road in White Plains	NY 125 / Mamaroneck Avenue	Entire length overlaps with NY 125
CR 27	0.97	1.56	Pleasantville Road (CR 106)	Bedford Road in Pleasantville	NY 141	Formerly part of NY 117
CR 27A	0.12	0.19	NY 117 in Mount Pleasant	Bedford Road	CR 106 at View Street in Pleasantville	Formerly part of NY 117
CR 29 (Note: Comprises CR 29, CR 29II, and CR 29A.)	2.26	3.64	NY 22 in North Castle	Broadway, Legion Drive, and Commerce Street	NY 141 / Liberty Street in Mount Pleasant	Partially overlaps NY 141
CR 30	2.93	4.72	NY 127 / Hutchinson River Parkway	North Street in White Plains	I-287 / NY 127	Entire length overlaps with NY 127
CR 32 (Note: Comprises CR 32 and CR 32B.)	0.23	0.37	Entrance to Delfino Park in White Plains	Lake Street	NY 120 in Harrison	
CR 32A			I-287	Underhill Avenue in Harrison	Lake Avenue (CR 32)	
CR 33 (1) (Note: Comprises CR 33I, CR 33II, and CR 33III.)	1.09	1.75	NY 9A	Palmer Road in Yonkers	CR 9 at Mile Square Road	
CR 33 (2)	0.74	1.19	CR 9 at NY 100	Palmer Road in Yonkers	Yonkers–Bronxville city/village line	Connects to NY 100 via CR 47IIA
CR 35	0.18	0.29	NY 100	Virginia Road in Mount Pleasant	Bronx River Parkway	
CR 36 (Note: Comprises CR 36 and CR 36A.)	0.58	0.93	CR 59 at NY 100	Tuckahoe Road in Yonkers	Yonkers–Tuckahoe city/village line	
CR 37	0.50	0.80	Columbus Avenue in Tuckahoe	Main Street	Midland Avenue (CR 69) in Eastchester	
CR 38	0.64	1.03	NY 127 in Harrison	Park Avenue	US 1 in city of Rye	
CR 39	1.37	2.20	June Road (CR 310)	Bloomer Road in North Salem	NY 121	
CR 40I	1.89	3.04	South State Road in Briarcliff Manor	Pleasantville Road	CR 106 at Mount Pleasant–Pleasantville town / village line	
CR 40II	1.12	1.80	North State Road in Briarcliff Manor	Pleasantville Road	Ossining village–Ossining town line	
CR 43	0.89	1.43	Pearl Avenue	Willett Avenue in Port Chester	Putnam Avenue (NY 982C)	Formerly part of US 1A
CR 44 (Note: Comprises CR 44 and CR 44A.)	0.93	1.50	Larchmont–Mamaroneck village/town line at Mamaroneck	Palmer Avenue and Mount Pleasant Avenue	Mamaroneck Avenue (CR 8) in village of Mamaroneck	
CR 47 (Note: Comprises CR 47I, CR 47II, and CR 47IV.)	4.99	8.03	New York City line	Central Park Avenue in Yonkers	I-87 / New York State Thruway / NY 100	
CR 47IIA	0.38	0.61	Palmer Road (CR 9 / CR 33I)	Three interchange ramps in Yonkers	NY 100	
CR 51	0.37	0.60	NY 22	Virginia Road in North Castle	Washington's Headquarters	
CR 52 (Note: Comprises CR 52 and CR 52A.)	0.56	0.90	NY 119 / Ferris Avenue	Hamilton Avenue in White Plains	NY 22 (CR 87) / NY 119	Entire length overlaps with NY 119 westbound
CR 53	1.23	1.98	NY 22 at Scarsdale–White Plains town/city line	New York Post Road in White Plains	NY 22 (CR 108) / NY 125	Entire length overlaps with NY 22
CR 54 (1) (Note: Comprises CR 54, CR 54B, and CR 54C.)	1.75	2.82	CR 80A at NY 127 in Harrison	Halstead Avenue and Theodore Fremd Avenue	NY 120 in city of Rye	
CR 54 (2)	3.79	6.10	NY 120 in city of Rye	Wappanoca Avenue and Ridge Street	NY 120A at the Connecticut state line in Rye Brook	
CR 56 (Note: Comprises CR 56 and CR 56A.)	1.56	2.51	Connecticut state line	Bedford–Banksville Road in North Castle	CR 12 at Middle Patent Road	
CR 58				King Street in Port Chester		Decommissioned.
CR 59	1.02	1.64	I-87 / New York State Thruway	Tuckahoe Road in Yonkers	CR 36 at NY 100	
CR 61			New York City line	Sanford Boulevard in Mount Vernon	Hutchinson River Parkway	
CR 62	3.28	5.28	CR 71 at I-287 at White Plains–Harrison city/town line	Westchester Avenue in Harrison	NY 120	
CR 63 (Note: Comprises CR 63 and CR 63II.)	1.48	2.38	Washington Street (CR 92)	South Street and North Division Street in Peekskill	Peekskill–Cortlandt city/town line	Partially overlaps US 202 and NY 35
CR 64 (Note: Comprises CR 64 and CR 64II.)	3.05	4.91	CR 29 at Legion Drive (CR 29)	Columbus Avenue in Mount Pleasant	Kensico Road (CR 1308)	
CR 65 (Note: Comprises CR 65 and CR 65A.)	0.33	0.53	New York City line at Pelham Manor	Pelham Shore Road, Echo Avenue, and Main Street	US 1 at New Rochelle–Mamaroneck city/town line	Partially overlaps US 1; Formerly part of NY 1B.
CR 66A			Yonkers–Mount Vernon city line	Yonkers Avenue bridge in Mount Vernon	Eastern end of bridge	
CR 67 (Note: Comprises CR 67I and CR 67II.)	0.87	1.40	NY 982J at LaSalle Drive in New Rochelle	Palmer Avenue	CR 44A at Larchmont–Mamaroneck village/town line in Larchmont	
CR 68	0.77	1.24	Kensico Circle	Kensico Circle Connector in North Castle	NY 22	
CR 69 (Note: Comprises CR 69 and CR 69II.)	0.61	0.98	Bronxville–Tuckahoe village line in Tuckahoe	Midland Avenue and Main Street	NY 22 in Eastchester	
CR 70	0.30	0.48	NY 22 (CR 311) in Mount Vernon	Pelham Parkway	US 1 in Pelham Manor	
CR 71	0.69	1.11	NY 22 (CR 87) / NY 119	Westchester Avenue in White Plains	CR 62 at I-287	
CR 72	1.76	2.83	Playland Parkway	Midland Avenue in city of Rye	NY 982B at Rye–Port Chester city/village line	
CR 73	1.90	3.06	US 1 in city of Rye	North Street, Hammond Road, and Old Post Road	NY 127 in Harrison	
CR 74	0.95	1.53	Myrtle Boulevard	Murray Avenue in town of Mamaroneck	NY 125	
CR 75I	1.53	2.46	Yonkers–Hastings-on-Hudson city/village line	Warburton Avenue in Hastings-on-Hudson	US 9	
CR 78 (Note: Comprises CR 78 and CR 78A.)	0.74	1.19	NY 100 in Greenburgh	Ardsley Road	Garth Road in Scarsdale	
CR 79	0.66	1.06	CR 4 at Pleasantville–New Castle town line	Washington and Greeley Avenues in New Castle	NY 120	
CR 80A	0.91	1.46	Mamaroneck–Harrison village/town line	Halstead Avenue in Harrison	CR 54 at NY 127	
CR 81			US 1	North Avenue in New Rochelle	CR 101 at Eastchester Avenue	
CR 82	0.78	1.26	NY 22 in Eastchester	Mill Road	North Avenue (CR 101) in New Rochelle	
CR 84	0.49	0.79	NY 22 in Mount Vernon	East Lincoln Avenue	Pelham–New Rochelle village/city line	
CR 87	1.23	1.98	NY 22 (CR 71) / NY 119	North Broadway in White Plains	NY 22 at the White Plains–North Castle city/town line	Entire length overlaps with NY 22
CR 90	0.11	0.18	NY 100 (CR 99) / Harding Road	Central Avenue in White Plains	NY 100 / NY 119	Entire length overlaps with NY 100
CR 91			CR 111 at Sanford Boulevard (CR 61)	South Fifth Avenue in Mount Vernon	West 1st Street	
CR 92	1.64	2.64	Lower South Street	Welcher Avenue and Washington Street in Peekskill	South Street (CR 63II)	
CR 94	1.66	2.67	Mamaroneck Avenue (CR 8B)	Union Avenue in Harrison	NY 127	
CR 98	3.03	4.88	NY 117	Bedford Center Road in town of Bedford	NY 22	
CR 99	0.68	1.09	NY 100 at Greenburgh–White Plains town/city line	Central Avenue in White Plains	NY 100 (CR 90) / Harding Road	Entire length overlaps with NY 100

== Routes 101–200 ==
Route	Length (mi)	Length (km)	From	Via	To	Notes
CR 101			CR 81 at Eastchester Road	North Avenue in New Rochelle	Mill Road (CR 82)	
CR 103			CR 3 in Bedford	Pound Ridge Road	NY 124 in Pound Ridge	Transferred to state on September 1, 1980; now part of NY 172
CR 104 (Note: Comprises CR 104 and CR 104II.)	0.98	1.58	NY 127 in Harrison	Polly Park Road and Bowman Avenue	NY 120A (CR 112) in Port Chester	
CR 106	0.52	0.84	CR 40I at Mount Pleasant–Pleasantville town / village line	Pleasantville Road and Bedford Road in Pleasantville	CR 27 at View Street	
CR 108	0.32	0.51	NY 22 (CR 53) / NY 125	New York Post Road in White Plains	NY 22 / Westchester Avenue (CR 71)	Entire length overlaps with NY 22
CR 111			New York City line	South Fifth Avenue in Mount Vernon	CR 91 at Sanford Boulevard (CR 61)	
CR 112	0.83	1.34	NY 120A / Bowman Avenue (CR 104)	Westchester Avenue in Port Chester	US 1 / NY 120A	Entire length overlaps with NY 120A
CR 113	0.67	1.08	Wilmot Road in New Rochelle	New Wilmot Road	NY 22 in Eastchester	
CR 124	0.16	0.26	NY 100 (CR 99)	Aqueduct Road in White Plains	NY 119	
CR 127	0.15	0.24	Putnam Avenue	McLean Avenue Bridge in Yonkers	Tibbets Road	Formerly part of NY 164
CR 129	0.46	0.74	NY 125 at Mamaroneck–Scarsdale town line	Weaver Street along New Rochelle–Scarsdale town line	NY 125 / Hutchinson River Parkway at New Rochelle–Scarsdale town line	Entire length overlaps with NY 125
CR 131			NY 129	Underhill Avenue in Yorktown	NY 118	
CR 132	0.09	0.14	Midland Avenue in Yonkers	Broad Street	Locust Street in Mount Vernon	
CR 133	2.00	3.22	NY 22	Cox Avenue and Byram Lake Road in North Castle	30 feet (9.1 m) south of pole #34 at Byram Lake Reservoir	
CR 134	1.17	1.88	US 9 in Dobbs Ferry	Ashford Avenue	Saw Mill River Parkway in Ardsley	
CR 135	0.86	1.38	NY 120 in North Castle	County Airport Access Road	Westchester County Airport in Rye Brook	
CR 136	0.08	0.13	Putnam County line at Somers (becomes CR 34)	Croton Falls Road	NY 22 in North Salem	
CR 137			US 202	Daisy Lane in Somers	Putnam County line (becomes CR 35)	
CR 138	3.59	5.78	NY 22	Hardscrabble Road in North Salem	June Road (CR 310)	
CR 139			North Avenue (CR 101)	Quaker Ridge Road in New Rochelle	NY 125 (CR 129)	
CR 142	0.41	0.66	NY 100	Fort Hill Road in Yonkers	Yonkers–Greenburgh city/town line	
CR 143	1.13	1.82	NY 125	Heathcote Bypass in Scarsdale	NY 125	
CR 144	1.38	2.22	Columbus Avenue (CR 64II) in Mount Pleasant	West Lake Drive and Kensico Dam Road	NY 22 in North Castle	
CR 147	0.31	0.50	North Street (CR 73)	Playland Parkway access road in city of Rye	Theodore Fremd Avenue (CR 54)	
CR 148	0.15	0.24	North Street (CR 73)	New York State Thruway access road in city of Rye	Playland Parkway	
CR 149	0.30	0.48	NY 22 (CR 87)	Orchard Street in White Plains	Central Westchester Parkway	
CR 150	0.80	1.29	I-287 in White Plains	Central Westchester Parkway	NY 22 in North Castle	
CR 151	0.74	1.19	The Fenway	Farragut Parkway in Hastings-on-Hudson	US 9	
CR 152	1.20	1.93	Playland Parkway access roads (CR 147 / CR 148)	Playland Parkway in city of Rye	Playland	
CR 153	0.62	1.00	NY 127 (CR 30) in White Plains	Bryant Avenue	Westchester Avenue (CR 62) in Harrison	
CR 154	0.30	0.48	NY 9A in Briarcliff Manor	North State Road	NY 100 in New Castle	
CR 155 (Note: Comprises CR 155 and CR 155I.)	0.48	0.77	Charles Street (CR 156)	Louisa Street in Peekskill	US 9	
CR 156	0.42	0.68	Buchanan–Peekskill village/city line	Charles Street in Peekskill	Louisa Street (CR 155)	

== Routes 201 and up ==
Route	Length (mi)	Length (km)	From	Via	To	Notes
CR 300	1.11	1.79	NY 100C	Woods Road in Mount Pleasant	Peripheral Road (CR 301)	
CR 301	1.07	1.72	Dana Road (CR 302)	Hammond House, Sunshine Cottage, and Peripheral roads in Mount Pleasant	NY 100	
CR 302	0.38	0.61	NY 9A	Dana Road in Mount Pleasant	Dead end	
CR 303	0.46	0.74	Saw Mill River Parkway on Mount Pleasant–Greenburgh line	Old Saw Mill River Road	NY 9A on Mount Pleasant–Greenburgh line	
CR 305			Paradise Island Park	South Riverside Avenue in Croton-on-Hudson	NY 9A / NY 129	
CR 307	0.24	0.39	Mustato Road	Jay Street in town of Bedford	NY 22	
CR 308	0.40	0.64	Rye city line	Highland Avenue in town of Rye	NY 120	
CR 309			NY 22	Girdle Ridge and Pea Pond roads in Bedford	NY 121	Locally maintained; formerly part of NY 137
CR 310	3.19	5.13	NY 121	June Road in North Salem	Putnam County line (becomes CR 55)	Formerly part of NY 124
CR 311			NY 22 / Pelham Parkway (CR 70)	South Columbus Avenue in Mount Vernon	Sanford Boulevard (CR 61)	Mostly overlapped with NY 22
CR 312			NY 22 (CR 311)	Kimball Place in Mount Vernon	Dead end	
CR 313	0.30	0.48	NY 100C	Walker Road in Mount Pleasant	Dana Road (CR 302)	
CR 1308			NY 141	Kensico Road in Mount Pleasant	Columbus Avenue (CR 64)	
CR 1309 (1)			US 6	East Main Street in Yorktown	NY 132	Former routing of US 6
CR 1309 (2)			US 6	East Main Street in Yorktown	NY 6N	Former routing of US 6
CR 1323 (1)	3.12	5.02	CR 19 at Sunset Drive east junction in Ossining	Pines Bridge Road	NY 134 in Yorktown	Formerly part of NY 135 from 1930 to c. 1935
CR 1323 (2)			Crow Hill Road	Lake Road in Yorktown	Yorktown–Bedford town line	
CR 9987	13.36	21.50	New York City line at Yonkers (becomes NY 907H)	Bronx River Parkway	Taconic State Parkway / NY 22 / NY 141 in Mount Pleasant	

== See also ==
- County routes in New York
- List of former state routes in New York (101–200)
