= New York State Route 164 (disambiguation) =

New York State Route 164 is an east–west state highway in Putnam County, New York, United States, that was established in 1970.

New York State Route 164 may also refer to:

- New York State Route 164 (1930–1940) in Schoharie County
- New York State Route 164 (1940–1960s) in Westchester County and New York City
