= Central Westchester Parkway =

Highway in New York, United States

- Central Westchester Parkway highlighted in red

Route information
- Maintained by Westchester County
- Length: 1.01 mi (1.63 km)
- Existed: August 13, 1932–present
- History: Closed June 3, 1957–September 2, 1960
- Component highways: CR 150 (unsigned) entire length

Major junctions
- South end: I-287 in White Plains
- North end: NY 22 in North Castle

Location
- Country: United States
- State: New York
- County: Westchester

Highway system
- County routes in New York; County Routes in Westchester County

The Central Westchester Parkway is a 1.01-mile (1.63 km) controlled-access parkway in Westchester County, New York, in the United States. It runs from exit 7 of the Cross Westchester Expressway (I-287) to New York State Route 22 (NY 22). The road has two intermediate exits and is maintained by Westchester County as County Route 150.

The Central Westchester Parkway was first conceived in the 1920s, from a plan by Westchester County to construct an east–west parkway from Elmsford to White Plains. Never constructed to its full length, the parkway was opened on August 13, 1932 from Westchester Avenue to the city of White Plains. The parkway however became part of a new project to connect the New York State Thruway and the New England Thruway, which would entail using the southern piece of the Central Westchester Parkway. The road was closed in 1957 and was not reopened until 1960, when a rebuilt section of the Central Westchester Parkway was built as a bypass of White Plains and the Cross Westchester Expressway opened to traffic.

== Route description ==
The Central Westchester Parkway begins at an interchange (exit 7) with access to and from the eastbound direction of I-287 (the Cross Westchester Expressway) in White Plains. The parkway, four lanes wide, parallels the Cross Westchester for a short distance, crossing under Grant Avenue before reaching exit 7A, a right-in/right-out interchange with Clinton Street on both sides of the highway. After an southbound-only interchange with Orchard Street, the Central Westchester Parkway turns northward through North White Plains, paralleling NY 22. A couple blocks north of Holland Avenue, the Central Westchester Parkway reaches a junction with NY 22 (North Broadway), where the right-of-way for the parkway merges into the northbound lanes. This junction marks the northern terminus of the Central Westchester Parkway.

== History ==
=== Construction and opening ===
The Central Westchester Parkway dates to a proposal for three new east–west parkways designed by the Westchester County Park Commission (established in 1922), which included the Cross County Parkway and the unbuilt O'Dell Parkway. This parkway would connect the village of Elmsford at the Saw Mill River Parkway and the city of White Plains at Westchester Avenue. The parkway would eventually be extended to the Hutchinson River Parkway near Silver Lake Park in White Plains. Construction began in 1930 of the new parkway with an initial section on the eastern edge of White Plains.

The parkway, slated to open around August 1, 1932 would have, contrary to most parkways through Westchester County, truck traffic. Residents of White Plains felt they approved the money for the new parkway to have the same no-truck restriction that the rest of the parkway system would have. Residents began a petition in July 1932 to be sent to the Westchester County Park Commission to continue the ban onto the Central Westchester. This first section of the Central Westchester Parkway opened on August 13, 1932, with a celebration headlined by a ribbon cutting with White Plains mayor Chauncey Griffin. The parkway segment cost $1 million (1932 USD) to construct and the ribbon was placed at the location of George Washington's first defensive line in 1776 during the Battle of White Plains.

Meanwhile, the parkway was not completely finished. By 1935, Westchester County had budgeted more money to extend the parkway to Tarrytown Road in Elmsford, Money from the county totaling $5 million (equivalent to $89.8 million in 2024) would go to extend the parkway. However, this extra segment of the parkway was never constructed.

=== Conversion to controlled-access highway ===
In the early 1950s, plans developed of a new 12-mile (19 km) expressway connecting the new New York State Thruway and the New England Thruway. Approved by then-Governor of New York Thomas Dewey in April 1952, the new parkway would parallel the Central Westchester Parkway to help ease traffic congestion through the area. Local groups were opposed to the project, because of the number of houses being lost in the new project, calling the project "a skunk in the parlor". After approval of the new project by the New York State Legislature, local groups took the argument directly to the advisers of Governor Dewey, who had stated that the route of new expressway would be chosen carefully.

After several alignments were proposed, the final alignment was chosen by state engineers on May 11, 1954, with modifications of the parkway between Lake Street and Westchester Avenue. The rest of the parkway would not be used by the new expressway. This new expressway, costing the State of New York $40 million (equivalent to $370 million in 2024), would use a piece of the Central Westchester Parkway through White Plains, Construction of the new expressway was slated to be completed in 1957, with money coming from the United States Government.

After several disputes over alignment delayed the project, the state of New York announced the opening of bids on the first segment of the brand new Cross Westchester Expressway on November 23, 1956, which would start on December 20. This first section, 4.26 miles (6.86 km) would connect from Hillside Avenue and Tarrytown Road in the town of Greenburgh to Westchester Avenue at the city line of White Plains and the town of Harrison. The expressway would also boast 10.52 miles (16.93 km) of access roads along with the six mainline lanes and a center median. The first section would also have 22 bridges be constructed, including a 1,293 feet (394 m) long viaduct over Bronx River Parkway, the namesake Bronx River and the New York Central Railroad's Harlem Division. In total this section would cost $13.576 million (equivalent to $120 million in 2024) according to engineers.

On May 4, 1957, it was announced the Central Westchester Parkway would be closed to traffic for two years, which would shut down the only bypass of White Plains for truck traffic, and if everything were to go correctly, the state would shut it down in a few days. However, the parkway was not shut down until June 3 as the parkway was prepared for absorption by the new highway. The part of the parkway not used for the new expressway though saw car traffic for a time in November 1958 as the county wanted to use the parkway to test fencing and barriers that were approved for the Hutchinson River Parkway. Cars would be sent crashing into barriers to see the effectiveness of the new barriers.

Meanwhile, in October 1959, the state of New York announced that the Cross Westchester Expressway would be finished possibly eight months earlier than expected, with a slated completion date of December 1, 1960, although the contract for the Elmsford section would allow it to go until April 1961. However, in May 1960, the nine-mile-long (14 km) stretch of the Cross Westchester Expressway was announced to open between the Greenburgh–White Plains line and the New England Thruway in Rye in July. Traffic at that time would be directed onto Tarrytown Road into downtown Elmsford.

In September 1960, the remaining one-mile-long (1.6 km) alignment of the Central Westchester Parkway was reconstructed to connect between NY 22 in North Castle and the new Cross Westchester Expressway, creating a two-mile (3.2 km) bypass of downtown White Plains. The new bypass also included pieces of Westchester Avenue, which were rebuilt and opened to help get commuters from North Castle to Port Chester, paralleling the new expressway. On December 21, 1960, it was announced that the final piece of the Cross Westchester Expressway would open officially by Governor Nelson Rockefeller on December 27, completing the new alignment. The expressway opened on December 27, gaining the designation of I-487, before being redesignated I-287 a year later, with Governor Rockefeller, Lieutenant Governor Malcolm Wilson and other state officials, who held the ceremony at the interchange with NY 22.

== Exit list ==
The entire route is in Westchester County.

Location	mi	km	Exit	Destinations	Notes
White Plains	0.00	0.00	–	I-287 east – Long Island, New England	Southern terminus; exit 7 on I-287; former I-487
White Plains	0.38	0.61	7A	Clinton Street	Right-in/right-out connections only; exit number not signed southbound
White Plains	0.55	0.89	–	Orchard Street to I-287 west – Governor Mario M. Cuomo Bridge	Southbound exit and entrance
North Castle	1.01	1.63	–	NY 22 north	Northern terminus; at-grade intersection
1.000 mi = 1.609 km; 1.000 km = 0.621 mi: Incomplete access
