= New York State Route 182 (disambiguation) =

New York State Route 182 is a north–south state highway in Niagara County, New York, United States, that was established in 1962.

New York State Route 182 may also refer to:

- New York State Route 182 (1933–1935) in Ottawa County
- New York State Route 182 (1935–1939) also in Ottawa County, from Constantia to US 11 in Hastings, see List of former state routes in New York (101–200)
