= County Road 150 =

County Road 150 or County Route 150 may refer to:

- County Road 150 (Hamilton County, Florida), formerly State Road 150
- County Road 150 (Madison County, Florida), also formerly State Road 150
- County Road 150 (Pinellas County, Florida)
- County Road 150 (Hennepin County, Minnesota)
- County Route 150 (Cortland County, New York)
- County Route 150 (Fulton County, New York)
- County Route 150 (Onondaga County, New York)
- County Route 150 (Westchester County, New York)
