= Playland Parkway =

Highway in New York

- Playland Parkway highlighted in red

Route information
- Maintained by Westchester County
- Length: 1.20 mi (1.93 km)
- Existed: 1929–present
- Component highways: CR 152 (unsigned) entire length

Major junctions
- West end: I-95 in Rye
- East end: Playland amusement park in Rye

Location
- Country: United States
- State: New York
- County: Westchester

Highway system
- County routes in New York; County Routes in Westchester County

Playland Parkway is a 1.20-mile-long (1.93 km) parkway in Westchester County, New York, in the United States. The short stretch of surface road and low-standard freeway connects Interstate 95 (I-95, named the New England Thruway) and U.S. Route 1 (US 1) with the Playland amusement park in Rye. The road is maintained by Westchester County as County Route 152.

Playland Parkway was originally conceived as a part of the Cross County Parkway, which would have crossed from Yonkers via Mount Vernon and New Rochelle before reaching Playland. The parkway was constructed by the Westchester County Park Commission in 1928 between US 1 and the amusement park, although the extension of the Cross County was dropped during the Great Depression due to financial strains. During the mid-1960s and early-1970s, the parkway was part of a proposal to create a new bridge across the Long Island Sound connecting Rye to Oyster Bay. Led by Robert Moses and the Triborough Bridge and Tunnel Authority, the bridge would have demolished homes and used a part of Playland Parkway for the right-of-way. Opposition was heavy within Rye, and in 1973, once more opposition was raised in Long Island, Nelson Rockefeller killed the project.

The parkway originally terminated at US 1 (Boston Post Road) upon opening, but construction was completed on the New England Thruway in 1958, extending the new parkway from US 1 to its current western terminus.

== Route description ==
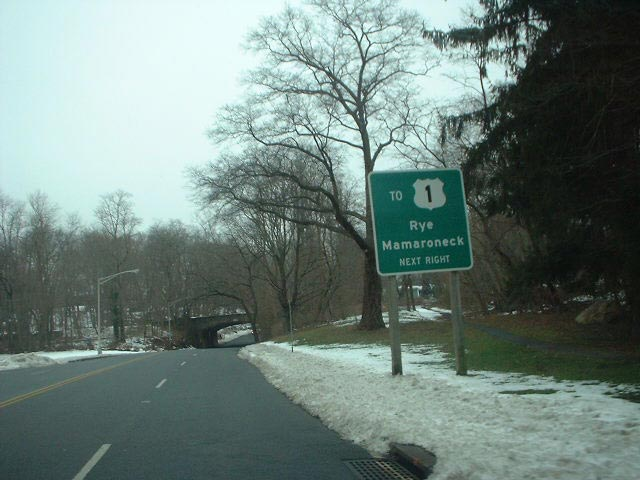
Playland Parkway approaching US 1 in Rye

Playland Parkway begins at an interchange with I-95 in Rye, heading southeast as a four-lane divided freeway. The road passes over Metro-North Railroad's New Haven Line and heads into wooded areas with nearby development, coming to an interchange with Old Post Road that provides access to US 1. Past this interchange, Playland Parkway becomes a four-lane undivided freeway and passes under US 1. The road continues through more woodlands near residential neighborhoods and becomes a four-lane boulevard, coming to an at-grade intersection with Milton Road. Playland Parkway curves more to the east and intersects Midland and Forest Avenues before ending at the entrance to the Playland amusement park on Long Island Sound, at which point the road gains a wide median.

== History ==
The four-lane parkway that would eventually become Playland Parkway was first conceived as part of the Cross County Parkway, which would connect the cities of Yonkers, Mount Vernon, and New Rochelle before reaching the shores of the Long Island Sound, where it would meet Playland Amusement Park. Playland Amusement Park, a new park maintained by the Westchester County Park Commission in Rye, opened to the public in 1928, bringing a more middle-class, family-oriented environment to the shores of Rye, which had been known for lewd behavior in the area. As result of the middle-class belief for the new park, the new parkway was designed so that a similar clientele could come by car to visit. Engineers considered Playland as the "junctional terminal of all the great boulevards of Westchester County", and as a result, designed the new parkway lined with elm trees to circle around the new Bath House and reach the entrance via a new traffic circle.

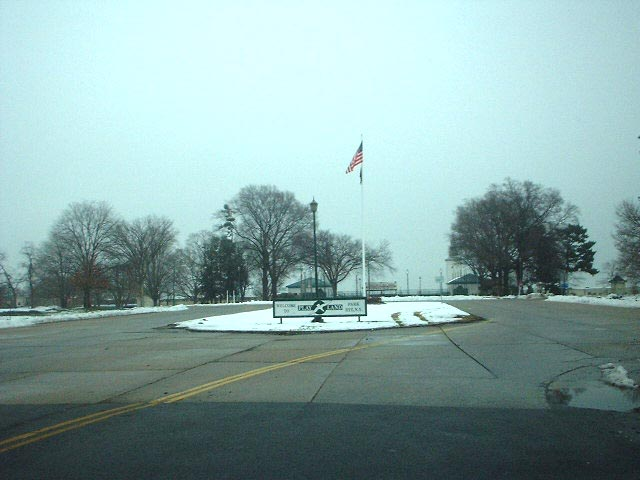
Playland Parkway at its eastern terminus, Rye Playland

The new parkway, which was conceptualized as a 15-mile (24 km) roadway, had the section between the Boston Post Road (US 1) and Rye Playland, with construction starting in 1928. The Westchester County Park Commission announced in its annual report in April 1928 that the new park and the parkway that it would go with would open in the summer of 1928 as part of appropriations of $47 million (1928 USD). While the section between the Boston Post Road and the park opened in 1929, the extension between the current-day Cross County Parkway and the current-day Playland Parkway was never constructed, due to the financial strains of the Great Depression.

In October 1958, the New England Thruway was completed through Westchester, connecting Pelham to Port Chester. With the opening of the new roadway, Playland Parkway was extended to then-exit 11 of the Thruway. This exit was renumbered to 19 as part of a complete number revamp in February 1980.

In the mid-1950s, proposals began for a bridge over the Long Island Sound, including a proposal for a crossing between the town of Oyster Bay and the city of Rye. A study was done in the 1960s for the Oyster Bay–Rye Bridge by Robert Moses and the Nassau-Suffolk County Planning Board to design the bridge, which originally would connect the Cross Westchester Expressway (I-287) and the Seaford–Oyster Bay Expressway (NY 135). The cost of the new project would run upwards of $150 million (1966 USD). The project also had the support originally of then-Governor of New York Nelson Rockefeller, along with several Long Island officials.

While there was support on the Long Island side of the sound, the amount of support in Rye was not as upbeat. In July 1965, Robert Moses had to redesign the route for the new bridge, so that rather than the Cross Westchester meeting the bridge, Playland Parkway would meet the new bridge. Opposition with Rye involved the fact that it would take $3 million of property demolition to fit the new bridges, although the original proposal would take over $6 million. Moving the approach to Playland did not amuse residents of Rye either, which would cost Playland Park its pool, bathhouse and some of the beach on the park. Other complaints included that while more houses would be saved, they would be in the area of heavy traffic. Clay Johnson, mayor of Rye opposed the project, citing it would ruin the neighborhoods of Rye. Rutherford Hubbard, the leader of the "Rye Citizens Advisory Committee Against The Sound Bridge" stated that Moses should think about the people and be more democratic about his decisions.

Once opposition started to appear on the Long Island side of the sound, Governor Rockefeller cancelled the project himself on June 20, 1973, seven years after the first proposal was selected.

== Major intersections ==
The entire route is in Rye, Westchester County.

mi	km	Destinations	Notes
0.00	0.00	I-95 to I-287 west – New York, White Plains, New Haven	Western terminus; exit 19 on I-95
0.40	0.64	To US 1 – Rye, Harrison, Mamaroneck	Access via Old Post Road; signed for US 1/Mamaroneck westbound, Harrison eastbound
		Eastern end of freeway section	
		Milton Road	
		Midland Avenue	
		Forest Avenue	
1.20	1.93	Playland amusement park	Eastern terminus
1.000 mi = 1.609 km; 1.000 km = 0.621 mi: Incomplete access
