= New York State Route 164 (1940–1960s) =

Former state highway in New York State

New York State Route 164
- NY 164 highlighted in red

Route information
- Maintained by NYSDOT
- Length: 5.06 mi (8.14 km)
- Existed: c. 1940–1960s

Major junctions
- West end: US 9 / NY 9A in Yonkers
- East end: US 1 in the Bronx

Location
- Country: United States
- State: New York
- Counties: Westchester, Bronx

Highway system
- New York Highways; Interstate; US; State; Reference; Parkways
← NY 163	→ NY 164

New York State Route 164 (NY 164) was a state highway in the New York City Metropolitan Area. It extended for 5 miles (8 km) from U.S. Route 9 (US 9) and NY 9A in Yonkers to US 1 in the New York City borough of the Bronx. The route ran mostly along the New York City line and indirectly met both the Saw Mill River Parkway and the New York State Thruway in Yonkers. NY 164 followed McLean Avenue in Yonkers and Nereid and Baychester Avenues in the Bronx.

The NY 164 designation was assigned c. 1940 to provide a signed route to the 1939–1940 New York World's Fair held in Queens. Originally, it began at the northern approach to the Bronx–Whitestone Bridge and followed Eastern Boulevard (now the path of the Bruckner Expressway) north to Baychester Avenue. As the Bruckner Expressway (Interstate 95 or I-95) was constructed in the 1960s, NY 164 was gradually truncated northward. The southern terminus was shifted north to the Bruckner Expressway's interchange with Gun Hill Road c. 1962, resulting in a partial realignment of NY 164, and to the junction of US 1 and Baychester Avenue by 1964. By 1970, the New York State Department of Transportation had completely removed the NY 164 designation, allowing it to be reassigned to another highway in Putnam County.

During the peak of expressway and parkway construction in New York City in the 1960s, a proposal was made to construct an expressway that would parallel the northern segment of NY 164. The proposed highway, known as the City Line Expressway, never advanced past the planning stages.

== Route description ==
NY 164 began at an intersection with US 9 and NY 9A (Broadway) in the Westchester County city of Yonkers. The highway headed southeastward as McLean Avenue, passing Sutherland Park and Pelton Park as it approached Van Cortlandt Park and the northern boundary of New York City. Just before the route reached the city line, it made a U-turn to the north and interchanged with the Saw Mill River Parkway by way of Putnam Avenue. East of Putnam Avenue, the route paralleled the city line southeast to Central Park Avenue, the latter split into two one-way streets as it served as service roads for the New York State Thruway.

Past the Thruway, NY 164 followed a more pronounced southeasterly alignment and entered the New York City borough of the Bronx, where it became known as Nereid Avenue. The route crossed the Bronx River and proceeded eastward through the Wakefield neighborhood of the Bronx to an intersection with Baychester Avenue. Here, NY 164 turned onto the aforementioned street and followed it southeastward through the northern Bronx. The route crossed East 233rd Street and went past Seton Falls Park just before it ended at a junction with US 1 (Boston Post Road).

== History ==
NY 164 was assigned c. 1940 to provide a signed route to the Bronx–Whitestone Bridge and the 1939–1940 New York World's Fair in Queens from Westchester County and the Bronx. The route began concurrent with NY 1A at the north approach to the Bronx–Whitestone Bridge and followed NY 1A north on Eastern Boulevard, now the path of the Bruckner Expressway. NY 1A and NY 164 split at the location of modern exit 8A, and NY 164 continued northwest on Baychester Avenue into the northern portion of the Bronx. At Nereid Avenue, NY 164 turned west, following Nereid and McLean Avenues to Broadway, where it ended at US 9 and NY 9A. The designation remained in place even after the World's Fair had concluded.

In the mid-1940s, NY 1A was realigned to follow the recently completed Hutchinson River Parkway Extension through the eastern Bronx, eliminating the overlap between NY 1A and NY 164. The routing of NY 164 itself remained unchanged until c. 1961, when the section of Eastern Boulevard (by this time known as Bruckner Boulevard) between Pelham Parkway and the Bruckner Interchange was upgraded into the Bruckner Expressway. Initially, there was no change to NY 164's routing as it followed the new highway from the Bronx–Whitestone Bridge to modern exit 12 (Baychester Avenue); however, by the following year, this section of the Bruckner Expressway was redesignated as part of I-95. As part of the change, NY 164 now began at exit 9 of the Bruckner Expressway and followed Gun Hill Road west to US 1. The two routes then embarked on an overlap northeast to Baychester Avenue, where NY 164 joined its previous alignment.

By 1964, NY 164 was truncated again, this time to the northeastern terminus of its overlap with US 1. The designation was removed entirely by 1970, allowing it to be reassigned to another road in Putnam County. Most of NY 164's former routing is currently maintained by the cities it passed through (New York City and Yonkers); the only part that is not city-maintained is the bridge carrying McLean Avenue over the Saw Mill River Parkway in Yonkers, which is maintained by Westchester County as the unsigned County Route 127.

In the mid-1960s, the Regional Plan Association (RPA) and the Tri-State Transportation Commission proposed that an expressway be built along East 223rd Street through the Woodlawn and Wakefield neighborhoods of the Bronx. The highway, known as the City Line Expressway, may have become a realignment of NY 164 if completed. The idea did not advance past the planning stages and was shelved in the late 1960s when Robert Moses was removed from his post as New York City's arterial coordinator.

== Major intersections ==
County	Location	mi	km	Destinations	Notes
Westchester	Yonkers	0.0	0.0	US 9 / NY 9A (Broadway)	Western terminus
Westchester	Yonkers	1.1	1.8	Saw Mill River Parkway south via Putnam Avenue	
Westchester	Yonkers	1.8	2.9	I-87 / New York Thruway via Central Park Avenue	
Bronx	Bronx	5.0	8.0	US 1 (Boston Road) / Baychester Avenue	Eastern terminus
1.000 mi = 1.609 km; 1.000 km = 0.621 mi

== See also ==
- List of county routes in Westchester County, New York
