= New York State Route 127 =

State highway in Westchester County, New York, US

New York State Route 127
- NY 127 highlighted in red

Route information
- Maintained by NYSDOT and Westchester County
- Length: 6.36 mi (10.24 km)
- Existed: 1930–present

Major junctions
- South end: US 1 in Mamaroneck
- Hutchinson River Parkway at the Harrison–White Plains line
- North end: I-287 at the White Plains–Harrison line

Location
- Country: United States
- State: New York
- Counties: Westchester

Highway system
- New York Highways; Interstate; US; State; Reference; Parkways
← NY 126	→ NY 128

New York State Route 127 (NY 127) is a 6.36-mile (10.24 km) north–south state highway in Westchester County, New York, in the United States. It begins at an intersection with U.S. Route 1 (US 1) in the village of Mamaroneck and ends at an interchange with Interstate 287 (I-287) in the city of White Plains. The route also connects to the Hutchinson River Parkway in the town of Harrison. NY 127 was assigned as part of the 1930 renumbering of state highways in New York; however, parts of the road had been state-maintained since the 1910s. Within White Plains, NY 127 is maintained by Westchester County as County Route 30 (CR 30). The concurrent county route designation is unsigned, as are all county routes in Westchester County.

== Route description ==
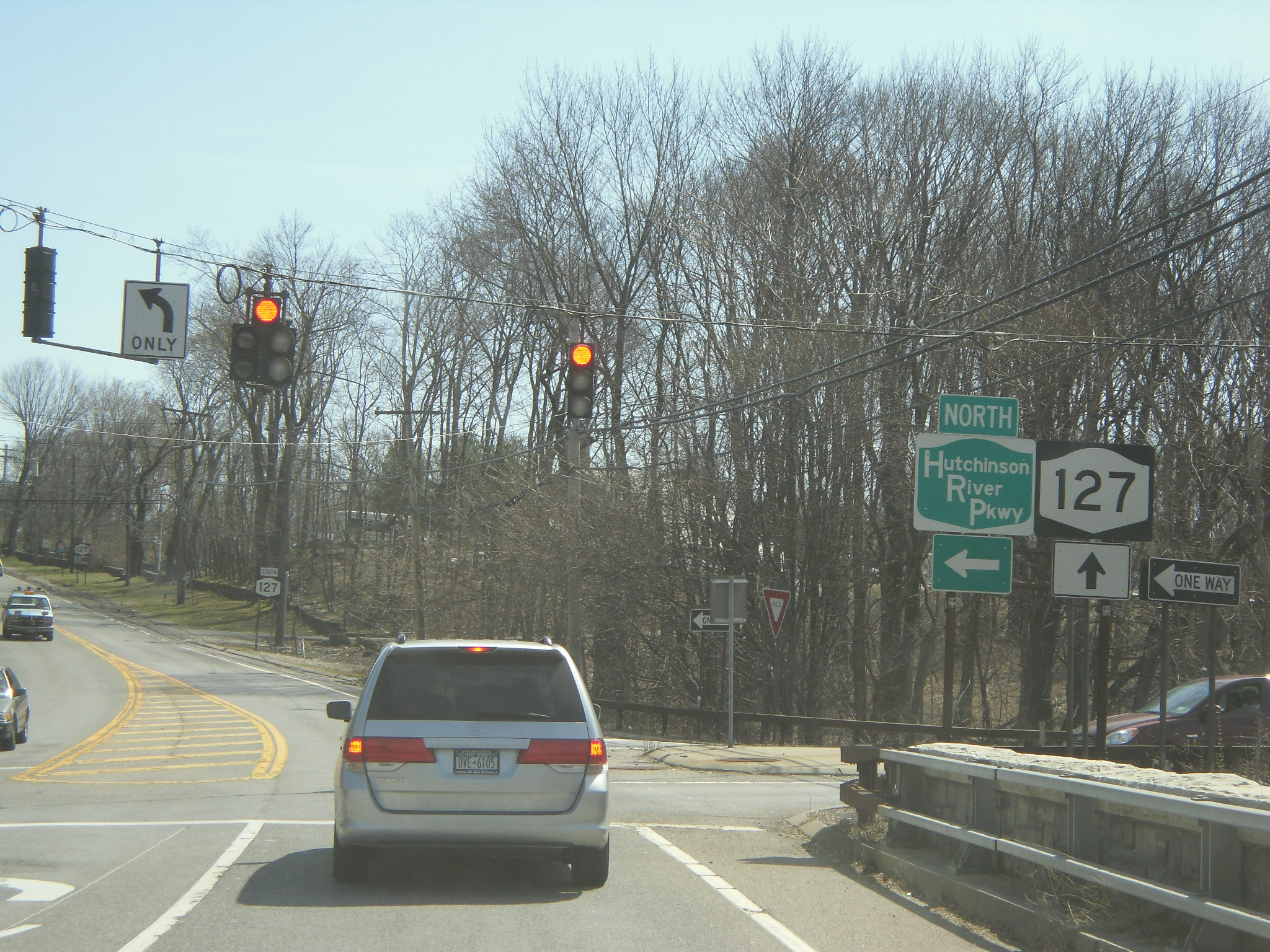
NY 127 southbound at the northbound Hutchinson River Parkway ramp in Harrison

NY 127 begins at an intersection with US 1 (East Boston Post Road) in the village of Mamaroneck. The highway proceeds northeast through Mamaroneck as a two-lane residential street named Keeler Avenue, crossing through the Old Rye Neck neighborhood. The route soon reaches a junction with Harrison Avenue, where it turns north off Keeler, leaving the Old Rye Neck neighborhood and soon the entire village. Now in the town and village of Harrison, NY 127 continues as Harrison Avenue, bending north into downtown Harrison, as a two-lane commercial street. Just after the junction with Halstead Avenue, the route crosses west of the parking lot for the Harrison Metro-North Railroad station and soon over the New Haven Line (Northeast Corridor) tracks.

After crossing the railroad, NY 127 enters a residential section of Harrison, crossing north as Harrison Avenue. Soon the route crosses under, but does not interchange with, the New England Thruway (I-95), winding northeast past the Harrison Avenue School and a junction with Union Avenue (unsigned CR 94). The route makes a gradual bend to the north, passing west of the Willow Ridge Country Club near the intersection with North Street. At the intersection, NY 127 drops the Harrison Avenue moniker, gaining the North Street one. The route bends northwest through a residential section of Harrison, reaching a junction with the Hutchinson River Parkway (exit 14). Upon crossing the Hutchinson River Parkway, NY 127 enters the Rosedale section of the city of White Plains.

Within White Plains, NY 127 becomes a county-maintained highway, gaining the designation of CR 30 as it passes the Maple Moor Golf Course. Winding up the hills of White Plains, the route crosses through the North Street section, becoming a four-lane residential street past White Plains Senior High School. Passing a commercial complex, NY 127 turns north and enters an interchange with the Cross Westchester Expressway (I-287). This interchange, which also serves Westchester Avenue (CR 62), marks the northern terminus of NY 127, whose right-of-way continues through the town of Harrison as White Plains Avenue.

== History ==
The state-maintained section of NY 127 was initially improved by the state of New York as part of two projects carried out in the 1910s. On March 17, 1910, the state awarded a contract to improve the 2.91-mile (4.68 km) segment of what is now NY 127 leading south from the White Plains–Harrison line. The rebuilt road was added to the state highway system on July 31, 1911, as State Highway 780 (SH 780). The remainder of the modern state-maintained segment of NY 127 was reconstructed as part of a contract let on September 28, 1916, to reconstruct 3.81 miles (6.13 km) of roads in Harrison and Rye. The rebuilt roads were accepted into the state highway system on December 21, 1921, as SH 1457. Both state highway numbers are unsigned. SH 780 and its southward continuation to US 1 in Mamaroneck did not receive a posted route number until the 1930 renumbering of state highways in New York when both roads became part of NY 127, a new route continuing north into White Plains to Westchester Avenue. The route's alignment has remained unchanged since that time.

== Major intersections ==
The entire route is in Westchester County.

Location	mi	km	Destinations	Notes
Village of Mamaroneck	0.00	0.00	US 1 (Boston Post Road)	Southern terminus
Harrison–White Plains line	3.86	6.21	Hutchinson River Parkway	Exit 14 on Hutchinson River Parkway
White Plains–Harrison line	6.36	10.24	To I-287 east – Rye I-287 west – White Plains, Governor Mario M. Cuomo Bridge	Northern terminus; access via Westchester Avenue; exit 8E on I-287
1.000 mi = 1.609 km; 1.000 km = 0.621 mi

== See also ==
- List of county routes in Westchester County, New York
