= New York State Route 125 =

State highway in Westchester County, New York, US

New York State Route 125
- Map of Westchester County in southeastern New York with NY 125 highlighted in red

Route information
- Maintained by NYSDOT, Westchester County and the city of White Plains
- Length: 7.50 mi (12.07 km)
- Existed: 1930–present

Major junctions
- South end: US 1 in Mamaroneck
- Hutchinson River Parkway at the New Rochelle–Scarsdale line
- North end: NY 22 in White Plains

Location
- Country: United States
- State: New York
- Counties: Westchester

Highway system
- New York Highways; Interstate; US; State; Reference; Parkways
← NY 124	→ NY 126

New York State Route 125 (NY 125) is a 7.50-mile (12.07 km) north–south state highway located within Westchester County, New York, in the United States. The route begins at an intersection with U.S. Route 1 (US 1) in the Town of Mamaroneck and ends at a junction with NY 22 in the city of White Plains. A section of the route in the city of White Plains is maintained by Westchester County and co-designated as County Route 26 (CR 26). A second county-owned segment exists along the New Rochelle–Scarsdale line as County Route 129. Both numbers are unsigned. NY 125 was assigned as part of the 1930 renumbering of state highways in New York, initially extending from US 1 to Mamaroneck Avenue in White Plains. It was extended north to NY 22 in the mid-1930s.

== Route description ==
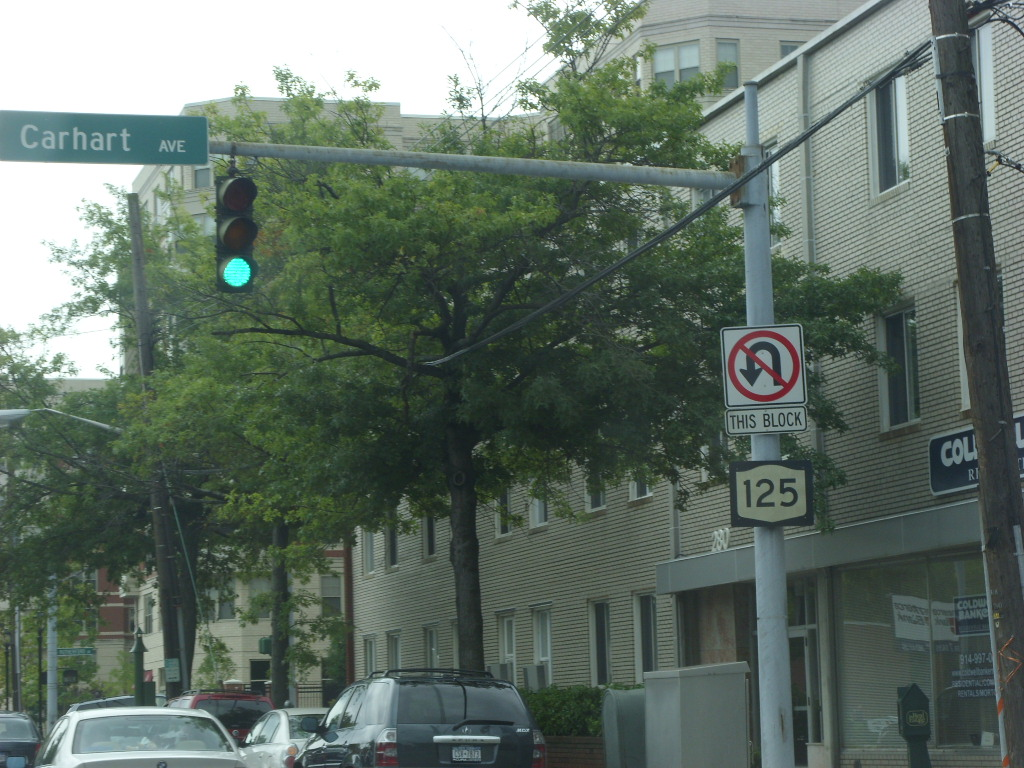
NY 125 at Carhart Avenue in White Plains, two blocks south of NY 22

NY 125 begins at an intersection with US 1 (Boston Post Road) in the town of Mamaroneck. Proceeding northwest as Weaver Street, NY 125 crosses through a residential section of Mamaroneck as a two-lane local road. It crosses over the New England Thruway (I-95) and the Metro-North Railroad's New Haven Line (shared with Amtrak as its Northeast Corridor) before bending southward around a school and climbing into the residential neighborhoods overlooking Mamaroneck. Passing Bonnie-Briar Country Club, the route crosses the Sheldrake River and turns northward to run along the border between the city of New Rochelle and the village of Scarsdale. After exiting Mamaroneck, the route becomes county-maintained and co-designated as CR 129.

It briefly runs along the eastern edge of New Rochelle's Pinebrook Heights and Pinebrook neighborhoods ahead of a partial interchange with the Hutchinson River Parkway (exit 20) in the Quaker Ridge section of New Rochelle. Access to the Parkway northbound is via Hutchinson Avenue. County maintenance ends just south of the junction while NY 125 continues past the parkway along the New Rochelle–Scarsdale line. It serves residential parts of both communities prior to fully entering Scarsdale and accessing the Heathcote section of the village. Here, the route connects to the west end of the Heathcote Bypass, a two-lane highway running below grade along the northern edge of the neighborhood. The bypass is designated County Route 143 and signed as NY 125 Bypass. NY 125 continues directly into the center of Heathcote, where it turns northeast onto Palmer Avenue at an intersection known locally as the Five Corners. The route continues northeastward for several blocks before gradually turning back to the north as it heads into nearby Secor Gardens.

The Palmer Avenue name ends at a junction with Secor Road, at which point NY 125 becomes known by the latter name. One block to the north, the highway connects to the east end of the Heathcote Bypass. From here, NY 125 takes a northeasterly track out of Secor Gardens and Scarsdale, passing the Fenway Golf Club on its way into the city of White Plains. Across the city line, maintenance of the route shifts to the county once again as CR 26. Now known as Old Mamaroneck Road, NY 125 serves several of the city's residential neighborhoods as it approaches downtown White Plains. The highway crosses into Gedney Park, becoming a two-lane residential street as it approaches Mamaroneck Avenue. At this junction, NY 125 shifts from a county-maintained road to a city street as it turns northwest through downtown White Plains. The route continues for another three blocks to its north end at junction with NY 22 (East Post Road), several blocks south of NY 119 (Main Street).

== History ==
On July 23, 1900, the state of New York awarded a contract to rebuild 2.78 miles (4.47 km) of roads in Mamaroneck and Scarsdale. The project covered the northernmost half-mile (0.8 km) and all but the northernmost 0.3 miles (0.48 km) of what is now NY 125 in Mamaroneck and Scarsdale, respectively. Both roads were added to the state highway system on October 24, 1901, as unsigned State Highway 19 (SH 19). The remainder of the route in Mamaroneck was added in the mid-1920s, and the 0.3-mile (0.48 km) segment leading south from the White Plains city line was taken over by the state sometime after 1926. NY 125 was assigned as part of the 1930 renumbering of state highways in New York. It began at US 1 and went north over the state highways in Mamaroneck and Scarsdale and locally maintained streets in New Rochelle and White Plains to Mamaroneck Avenue, then NY 126. The NY 126 designation was removed c. 1936, at which time NY 125 was extended north to NY 22.

In the mid-20th century, the route was proposed to be realigned onto an expressway loosely following the Bronx River Parkway and NY 22 between the Bronx and White Plains. While the parkway was restricted to non-commercial vehicles, the proposed highway was intended to serve vehicles of all types. The proposal was abandoned in the 1960s. Part of the expressway's planned route along the former right-of-way of the New York, Westchester and Boston Railway's line to White Plains was eventually used for the Heathcote Bypass in the mid-1960s.

== Major intersections ==
The entire route is in Westchester County.

Location	mi	km	Destinations	Notes
Town of Mamaroneck	0.00	0.00	US 1 (Boston Post Road) – Mamaroneck, Harrison	Southern terminus
New Rochelle–Scarsdale line	2.98	4.80	Hutchinson River Parkway north	Exit 11 on Hutchinson River Parkway
New Rochelle–Scarsdale line	3.85	6.20	NY 125 Byp. north (Heathcote Bypass)	Southern terminus of NY 125 Byp.
Scarsdale	5.33	8.58	NY 125 Byp. south (Heathcote Bypass) – New Rochelle, Mamaroneck, Larchmont	Northern terminus of NY 125 Byp.
White Plains	7.50	12.07	NY 22 (East Post Road)	Northern terminus
1.000 mi = 1.609 km; 1.000 km = 0.621 mi

== Related route ==
New York State Route 125 Bypass
- Heathcote Bypass, County Route 143
- Location: Scarsdale
- Length: 1.0 mi (1.6 km)

New York State Route 125 Bypass (NY 125 Bypass), also known as the Heathcote Bypass, is a bypass of a section of NY 125 along Weaver Street, Palmer Avenue, and Secor Road. The bypass was built on the roadbed of the former New York, Westchester and Boston Railway. The road travels below grade, passing Wilmont, Heathcote, and Mamaroneck Roads. The road's terminals are at stoplight-controlled intersections with slip ramps for the southbound lanes, which allow complete southbound travel through the bypass without stopping.

The route is co-designated, but not signed, as County Route 143.

== See also ==
- List of county routes in Westchester County, New York
