= New York State Route 120A =

Highway in New York and Connecticut

New York State Route 120A
- Map of southern Westchester County with NY 120A highlighted in red

Route information
- Auxiliary route of NY 120
- Maintained by NYSDOT, Westchester County and the village of Port Chester
- Length: 8.55 mi (13.76 km)
- Existed: c. 1931–present

Major junctions
- South end: I-287 / NY 120 in Harrison, NY
- Route 15 / Merritt Parkway / Hutchinson River Parkway at the Rye Brook, NY–Greenwich, CT line
- North end: NY 120 in North Castle, NY

Location
- Country: United States
- State: New York
- Counties: Westchester (NY), Fairfield (CT)

Highway system
- New York Highways; Interstate; US; State; Reference; Parkways
← NY 120	→ NY 121
State Routes in Connecticut

New York State Route 120A (NY 120A) is a state highway in southern Westchester County, New York, in the United States. It serves as an alternate route to the southern half of NY 120 running along the New York–Connecticut state line. The southern terminus of the route is at NY 120 in Harrison. Its northern terminus is at NY 120 in North Castle. Most of the 8.55-mile (13.76 km) route straddles the New York–Connecticut state line, and part of the route is physically located in Connecticut. However, this part of the highway is not recognized by Connecticut as "Route 120A", and is considered to be part of NY 120A by the New York State Department of Transportation (NYSDOT).

== Route description ==
NY 120A begins at an intersection with NY 120 next to I-287 (the Cross Westchester Expressway) in the village of Harrison. Although the route is signed north–south, it initially heads east along Westchester Avenue. East of the freeway overpass, NY 120 leaves to the northwest while NY 120A continues eastward on the four-lane Westchester Avenue. It serves residential areas until it crosses into Rye Brook, where the street makes a turn to the southeast and soon enters more commercialized neighborhoods. In the center of Rye Brook, the route meets Ridge Street (unsigned County Route 54 or CR 54). The businesses give way to homes east of the junction, and NY 120A passes into the village of Port Chester just three blocks from Ridge Street near an intersection with Bowman Avenue (CR 104).

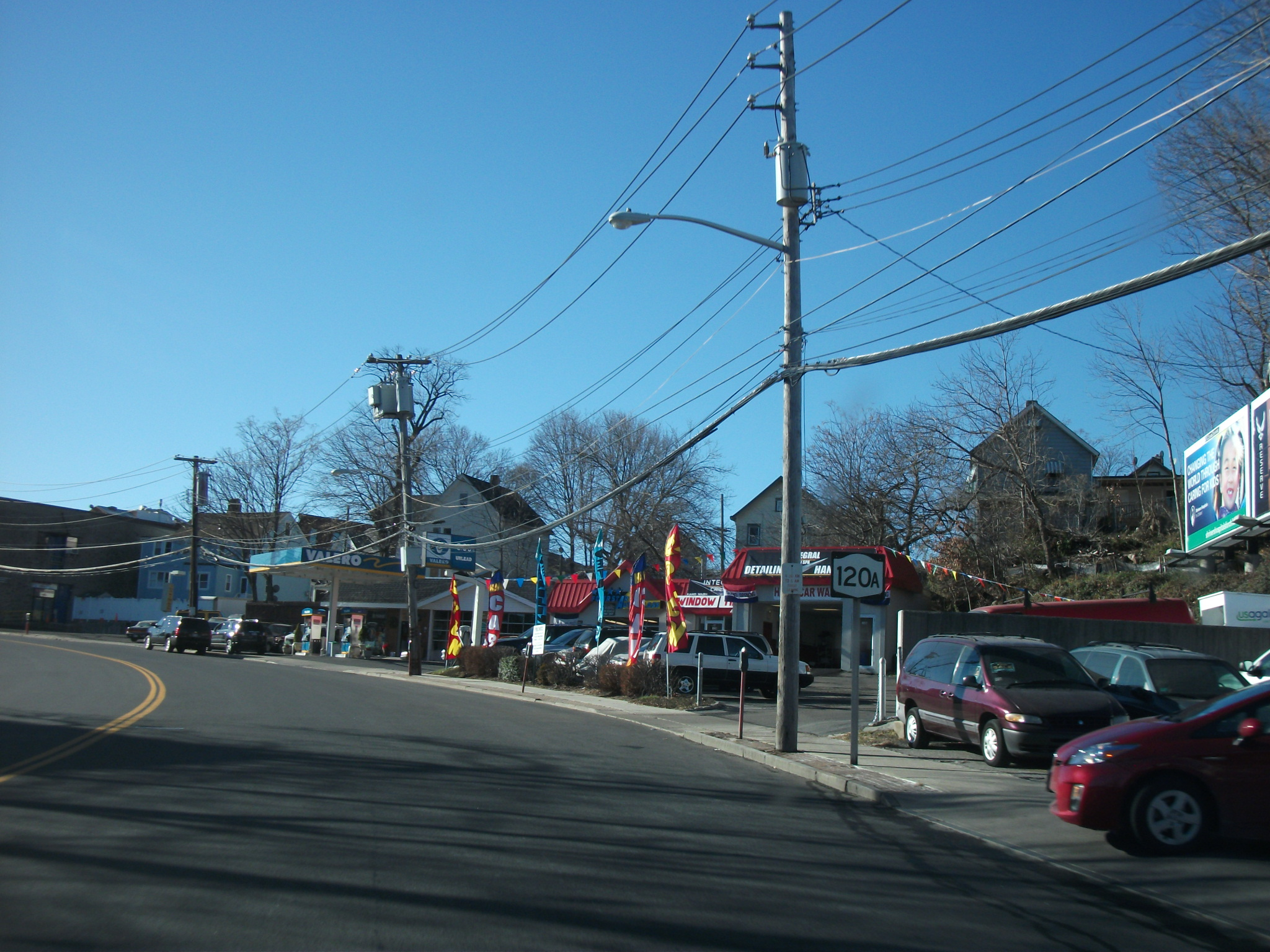
NY 120A through the village of Port Chester

Inside the village limits, maintenance of NY 120A shifts from the state to Westchester County, which inventories the route as CR 112. Continuing on, the road narrows to two lanes ahead of Port Chester's central business district, where NY 120A passes the Port Chester Public Library and the village's post office ahead of a junction with Pearl Street three blocks west of U.S. Route 1 and two blocks west of the Metro-North Railroad. Here, NY 120A turns off Westchester Avenue and onto North Pearl Street, becoming a village-maintained route in the process. The route's northeastward run on North Pearl Street is brief, however, as NY 120A turns northwest onto King Street after just two blocks.

As the route heads away from Pearl Street and Port Chester's commercial center, the blocks of businesses are gradually replaced with the residential neighborhoods that comprise most of northern Port Chester. About 0.8 miles (1.3 km) north of Pearl Street, NY 120A passes Lyon Park and reverts to a state-maintained road at an intersection with Putnam Avenue (unsigned NY 982C). Continuing on, the highway serves King Street School before crossing from Port Chester to Rye Brook several blocks later. In the latter village, the route slowly bends northward toward the Connecticut state line. It eventually reaches the boundary, at which point NY 120A begins to run northwestward along the state line, with the southbound lane in New York and the northbound lane in Connecticut. A short distance later, the route connects to the Hutchinson River Parkway and its Connecticut continuation, the Merritt Parkway (Route 15), by way of a modified cloverleaf interchange.

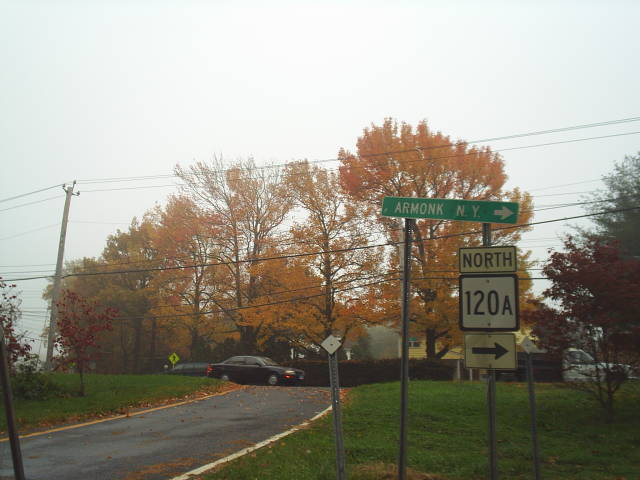
An erroneous CT 120A shield at the interchange between NY 120A and the Merritt and Hutchinson River Parkways in Greenwich, Connecticut

Not far from the interchange, the highway bends northward to fully enter Connecticut. Although the road is located outside of New York, it is maintained by NYSDOT and considered by the DOT to be part of NY 120A. In Connecticut, NY 120A travels generally northwestward through the town of Greenwich, intersecting several streets of local importance, including Greenwich's locally maintained continuation of Anderson Hill Road (CR 18). The foray into Connecticut ends soon afterward, and the route proceeds to straddle the state line for another 0.7 miles (1.1 km). Along this stretch, the route passes a series of commercial buildings in an otherwise residential area. Another New York-maintained stretch in Greenwich, Connecticut, soon follows as the route veers north to bypass the grounds of Westchester County Airport. As the route heads past the airport, it meets Rye Lake Road, Greenwich's connection to both the airport and Airport Road (CR 135).

Past Rye Lake Road, NY 120A serves the Griffith E. Harris Golf Club and several mansions on its way back to the New York–Connecticut state line. Just north of the airport, NY 120A turns westward onto Gateway Lane, a small east–west street leading back into New York and the town of North Castle. Gateway Lane and NY 120A both end just inside the state line at an intersection with NY 120. Here, NY 120 changes names from Purchase Street to King Street as the route continues NY 120A's course along the state line.

== History ==
The portion of Westchester Avenue from Purchase Street in Harrison to North Pearl Street in Port Chester was originally designated as part of NY 119 in the 1930 renumbering of state highways in New York. By the following year, a spur route connecting NY 119 to NY 120 in North Castle was assigned the NY 120A designation. It began at Westchester Avenue and went north to the Connecticut state line via Ridge Street, where it turned northwest to follow King Street to NY 120. The section of King Street between Ridge Street and Port Chester was designated as NY 120B by 1932.

NY 120A was truncated c. 1938 to consist only of the Ridge Street portion of its alignment while NY 120B was extended northwest along King Street to NY 120 in North Castle and southward along NY 119 and Ridge Street to a terminus at NY 120 in Rye. The NY 120B designation was eliminated by the following year, at which time NY 120A was reextended along King Street to North Castle and realigned east of Ridge Street to follow old NY 120B into Port Chester. NY 119 was truncated on its east end to NY 22 in White Plains in October 1960 while NY 120 was rerouted to follow what had been NY 119A south to Rye along Purchase Street. The former routing of NY 119 and NY 120 from Purchase Street to downtown Port Chester became an extension of NY 120A.

On September 1, 1980, ownership and maintenance of the 0.5-mile (0.80 km) section of NY 120A leading southeast from the northwestern crossing into Connecticut was transferred from Westchester County to the state of New York as part of a highway maintenance swap between the two levels of government. The road was one of 10 highways exchanged during the swap. That same day, the routing of NY 120A in Port Chester was modified slightly to follow North Pearl Street between Westchester Avenue and King Street.

== Major intersections ==
State	County	Location	mi	km	Destinations	Notes
New York	Westchester	Harrison	0.00	0.00	I-287 / NY 120 (Westchester Avenue) – Rye, White Plains	Southern terminus; exit 10 on I-287
New York	Westchester	Port Chester	1.93	3.11	To US 1	Access via Westchester Avenue
New York	Westchester	Port Chester	2.91	4.68	To US 1	Access via NY 982C
New York– Connecticut state line	Westchester– Fairfield county line	Rye Brook– Greenwich line	4.30	6.92	Route 15 north / Merritt Parkway north / Hutchinson River Parkway south	Exit 19A on Hutchinson River Parkway; exit 19B on Merritt Parkway
New York	Westchester	North Castle	8.55	13.76	NY 120 to I-684	Northern terminus; serves Westchester County Airport
1.000 mi = 1.609 km; 1.000 km = 0.621 mi

== See also ==
- List of county routes in Westchester County, New York
