= New York State Route 120 =

State highway in Westchester County, New York, US

New York State Route 120
- Map of the lower Hudson Valley with NY 120 highlighted in red

Route information
- Maintained by NYSDOT and the city of Rye
- Length: 18.03 mi (29.02 km)
- Existed: 1930–present

Major junctions
- South end: US 1 in Rye
- I-287 / NY 120A in Purchase; Hutchinson River Parkway in Purchase; I-684 in West Harrison; NY 22 in Armonk; Saw Mill River Parkway in Chappaqua
- North end: NY 100 in Millwood

Location
- Country: United States
- State: New York
- Counties: Westchester

Highway system
- New York Highways; Interstate; US; State; Reference; Parkways
← NY 119	→ NY 120A

New York Route 120 (NY 120) is a state highway in southern Westchester County, New York, in the United States. It begins in the city of Rye at an intersection with U.S. Route 1 (US 1) and runs for about 18 miles (29 km) north to the hamlet of Millwood, where it ends at a junction with NY 100. The route intersects with Interstate 684 (I-684) and the Saw Mill River Parkway, and serves the Westchester County Airport in North Castle. Portions of the route have been signed ceremonially in remembrance of American serviceman killed in the 2000s and 2010s during the wars in Iraq and Afghanistan.

NY 120 was assigned as part of the 1930 renumbering of state highways in New York, but only to the portion of its routing north of Westchester Avenue. It was extended south to Rye c. 1938, then rerouted to follow Westchester Avenue east to Port Chester by the following year. Most of NY 120's former routing to Rye became part of New York State Route 119A at that time. NY 120 was rerouted to serve Rye again in October 1960, replacing NY 119A.

== Route description ==
=== Rye to Harrison ===
NY 120 begins at an intersection with US 1 (Boston Post Road) in the city of Rye. The route proceeds northward along Purchase Street as a two-lane street through the Locust Avenue Business District, intersecting a handful of local streets and serving Rye's station on the Metro-North Railroad's New Haven Line. Past the station, the highway passes under the New Haven Line, Amtrak's Northeast Corridor line, and I-95 in quick succession ahead of the Purchase Street Business District. The commercial surroundings give way to residential neighborhoods after three blocks as NY 120 winds northward through the northern part of Rye to the adjacent village/town of Harrison.

In Harrison, NY 120 passes several mansions on both sides of the highway as it gradually turns northwestward and approaches I-287 (the Cross Westchester Expressway). The route parallels the western edge of the freeway for several blocks to Westchester Avenue, where NY 120 meets the southern end of NY 120A, an alternate route through the easternmost part of Westchester County. While NY 120A heads east toward Port Chester, NY 120 takes on the Westchester Avenue name as the two directions of the route split to follow collector/distributor roads running northwestward along both sides of I-287. The route remains on the frontage roads for about a half-mile (0.8 km) to another section of Purchase Street, where NY 120 turns to follow a slightly more northward track through another residential section of Harrison.

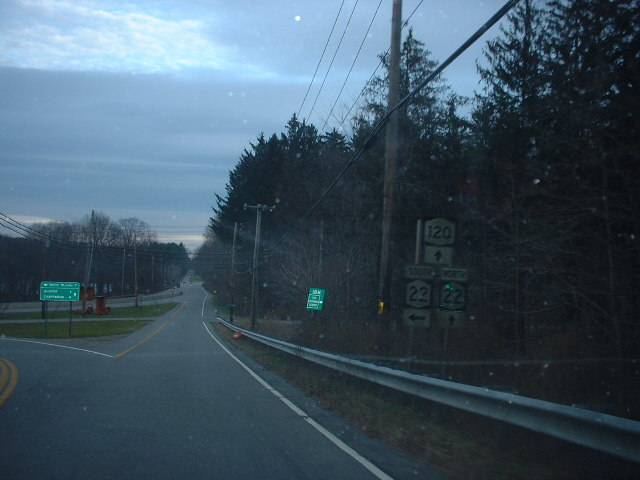
NY 120 northbound approaching the junction with NY 22 on the shores of the Kensico Reservoir in North Castle

Less than 1 mile (1.6 km) from I-287, NY 120 connects to the Hutchinson River Parkway by way of exit 27, a diamond interchange just northeast of the parkway's interchanges with I-287 and a reference route spur leading to I-684. Continuing northward from the parkway, the highway enters the hamlet of Purchase, where NY 120 runs along the eastern edge of Manhattanville College's campus and passes a short distance west of the State University of New York at Purchase. Part of Purchase Street near the entrance to SUNY Purchase at Anderson Hill Road is named the Specialist Anthony N. Kalladeen Memorial Highway in memory of United States Army Specialist Anthony Kalladeen, a SUNY Purchase student who was killed in Iraq in 2004. A dormitory at the school is also named for him.

Another stretch of homes north of Purchase leads to Westchester County Airport, situated between NY 120 and the New York–Connecticut state line about 1 mile (1.6 km) to the east. Here, NY 120 begins to run alongside I-684 as a four-lane undivided road and both roads pass by Rye Lake, an offshoot of the Kensico Reservoir. NY 120 meets the airport's main entrance in the town of North Castle, where the road connects to I-684 via Airport Road (unsigned County Route 135 or CR 135), where NY 120 reduces to two lanes.

=== North Castle to Millwood ===
Continuing northward, I-684 and NY 120 head due north toward the state line, where NY 120A rejoins its parent route at a junction with King Street just north of the airport. From here, I-684 continues north into Connecticut while NY 120 takes on the King Street name and turns northwest to straddle the state line for roughly 1 mile (1.6 km). The route passes over I-684 and the northern tip of Rye Lake and serves an industrial complex in the Connecticut town of Greenwich before the state line turns 90 degrees to the northeast. NY 120 remains on a northwesterly alignment, however, and it crosses the Delaware Aqueduct prior to meeting NY 22 (Mount Kisco Road) on the edge of another Kensico Reservoir inlet. The two routes briefly overlap to cross the inlet on a causeway before splitting on the water body's north shore. From here, NY 120 heads through substantially less developed, mostly wooded areas as it traverses the northeastern edge of the reservoir.

North of the reservoir, NY 120 crosses the northernmost part of the Bronx River and traverses the northeastern corner of the town of Mount Pleasant, where the woods give way to a handful of residential neighborhoods. The transition in surroundings continues into the adjacent town of New Castle, home to housing tracts that become less isolated as the road veers westward toward the hamlet of Chappaqua. NY 120 proceeds west through residential and commercial areas to Chappaqua's central business district, where it meets the community's main north–south route, NY 117 (Bedford Road). NY 120 heads north through the center of Chappaqua, overlapping with NY 117 to reach another section of King Street one block to the north. Past NY 117, NY 120 continues generally westward through Chappaqua, changing names to Quaker Road a short distance east of Chappaqua's station on the Metro-North Railroad's Harlem Line.

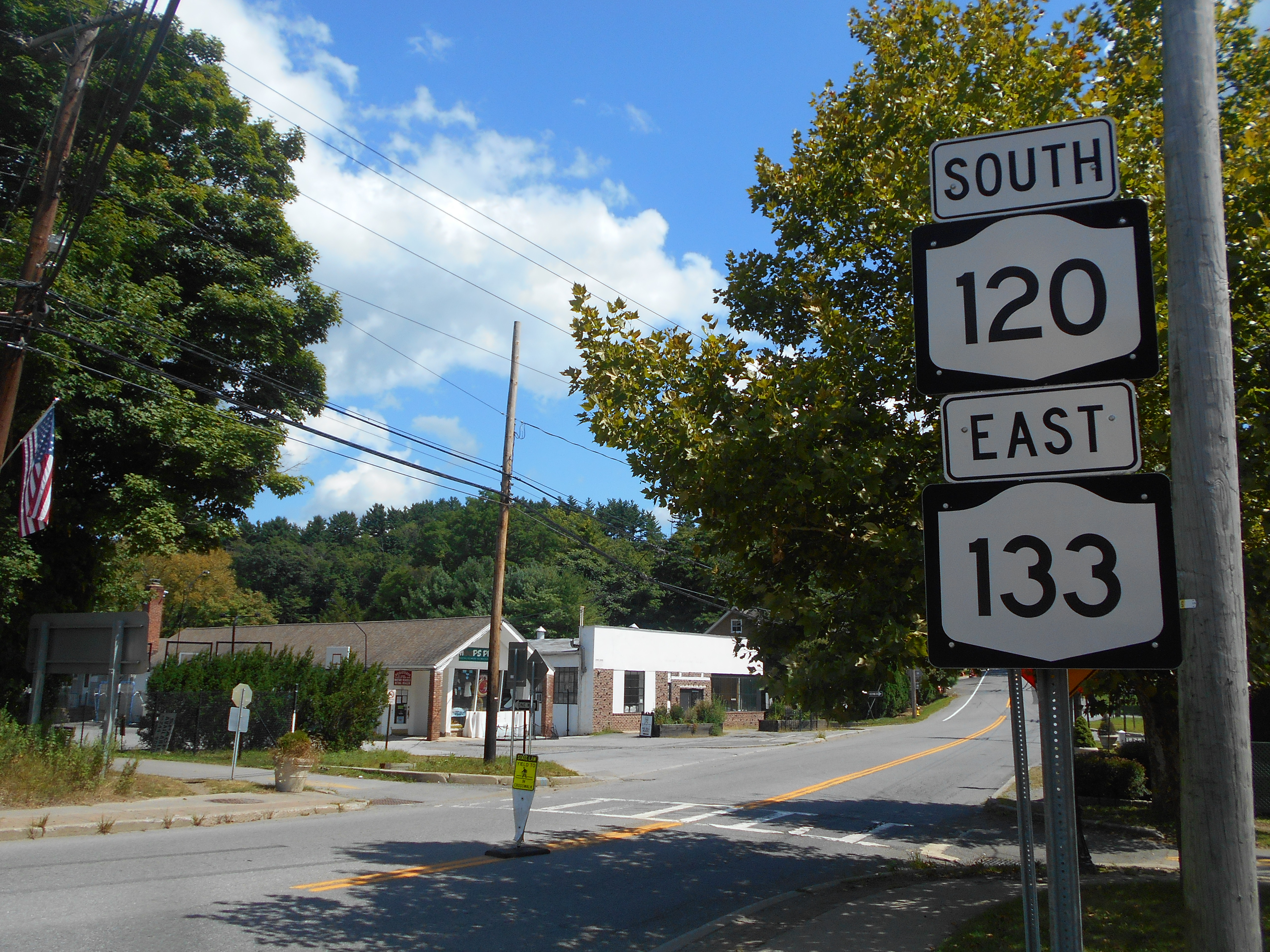
NY 120 southbound along concurrency with NY 133 in Millwood

After crossing the Harlem Line, the route dips under the Saw Mill River Parkway and intersects two parallel local streets leading to the parkway's exit 32. NY 120 turns northward here, crossing over the Saw Mill River and leaving Chappaqua for less densely populated areas of the town of New Castle. At 0.6 miles (0.97 km) north of Chappaqua early 19th-century farmhouses that clustered around the Quaker meeting house that was then the center of Chappaqua, line the road. Today these are listed on the National Register of Historic Places as the Old Chappaqua Historic District.

Roughly 1.5 miles (2.4 km) past the historic district, NY 120 makes a gradual turn to the west to reach a junction with NY 133 (Millwood Road). NY 120 turns onto NY 133, following Millwood Road westward into the hamlet of Millwood and its commercial center. Here, the two routes cross the right-of-way of the former Putnam Division of the New York Central Railroad and pass by the site of Millwood's station, which was demolished in May 2012 after years of neglect. Just after the railroad right-of-way, NY 133 turns southwestward onto Station Place while NY 120 proceeds northwest as Millwood Road for one more sparsely developed block before terminating at a junction with NY 100 (Saw Mill River Road) at the northern edge of the hamlet.

== History ==
The segment of modern NY 120 between Westchester Avenue and the north end of the overlap with NY 22 was originally designated as part of Route 1, an unsigned legislative route, by the New York State Legislature in 1908. Route 1 approached Purchase Street from the west on Westchester Avenue and continued north from Armonk on what is now NY 22. NY 120, meanwhile, was assigned as part of the 1930 renumbering of state highways in New York to the portion of its modern alignment north of the junction of Purchase Street and Westchester Avenue (then NY 119) in Harrison. It was extended south to US 1 in Rye c. 1938 by way of Purchase Street and Highland Road.

NY 120 was altered again by the following year to follow NY 119 east along Westchester Avenue to US 1 in Port Chester. Most of NY 120's former routing south of Westchester Avenue became part of NY 119A, a new route assigned to all of Purchase Street between NY 119 and NY 120 in Harrison and US 1 in Rye. NY 120 was realigned once more in October 1960 to follow Purchase Street south to Rye, supplanting NY 119A. At the same time, NY 119 was truncated on its east end to Purchase Street while the portion of Westchester Avenue that had carried NY 119 and NY 120 between Purchase Street and Port Chester became an extension of NY 120A.

The two-lane bridge carrying NY 120 over the Metro-North Railroad in Chappaqua was rebuilt as a four-lane bridge in 2012 for $19 million. Once completed, the bridge was named the SSG Kyu Hyuk Chay Memorial Bridge in memory of Army Staff Sergeant Kyu Chay, whose family owns a dry cleaning business adjacent to the bridge. A plaque was also erected in his honor at the war memorial by the Chappaqua train station. Chay, a Special Forces linguist and Korean immigrant, was three credits shy of his law degree at Brooklyn Law School when he was killed in Afghanistan.

== Suffixed routes ==
New York State Route 120B
- Location: Rye city–North Castle
- Existed: c. 1932–c. 1939

NY 120 once had two suffixed routes; only one still exists.

- NY 120A (8.55 miles or 13.76 kilometres) is an alternate route of NY 120 between Harrison and North Castle. The northern half of the route straddles the New York–Connecticut state line, and two portions of the route are physically located in Connecticut. It was assigned c. 1931.
- NY 120B was an alternate route of NY 120 between Rye and North Castle. It was assigned by 1932 and partially replaced by NY 120A c. 1939.

== Major intersections ==
The entire route is in Westchester County.

Location	mi	km	Destinations	Notes
City of Rye	0.00	0.00	US 1 (Boston Post Road)	Southern terminus
Harrison	2.15	3.46	NY 120A north (Westchester Avenue)	Southern terminus of NY 120A; former NY 119
Harrison	2.49	4.01	I-287 west – White Plains	Exit 10 on I-287; former I-487
Harrison	3.50	5.63	Hutchinson River Parkway	Exit 16B on Hutchinson River Parkway; hamlet of Purchase
Town of North Castle	7.59	12.21	I-684 to I-287 – Westchester County Airport	Access via Airport Road; exit 2 on I-684
Town of North Castle	7.97	12.83	NY 120A south	Northern terminus of NY 120A
Town of North Castle	9.44	15.19	NY 22 south – White Plains	Southern end of NY 22 concurrency
Town of North Castle	9.76	15.71	NY 22 north – Armonk	Northern end of NY 22 concurrency
Town of New Castle	13.99	22.51	NY 117 south – Pleasantville	Southern end of NY 117 concurrency; hamlet of Chappaqua
Town of New Castle	14.05	22.61	NY 117 north – Mount Kisco	Northern end of NY 117 concurrency; hamlet of Chappaqua
Town of New Castle	14.73	23.71	Saw Mill River Parkway	Access via Hunts Place/Mill River Road; exit 32 on Saw Mill River Parkway
Town of New Castle	17.30	27.84	NY 133 east – Mount Kisco	Southern end of NY 133 concurrency
Town of New Castle	17.83	28.69	NY 133 west	Northern end of NY 133 concurrency; hamlet of Millwood
Town of New Castle	18.03	29.02	NY 100 – Somers	Northern terminus; hamlet of Millwood
1.000 mi = 1.609 km; 1.000 km = 0.621 mi: Concurrency terminus; Incomplete access
