= New York State Route 119 =

State highway in Westchester County, New York, US

New York State Route 119
- Map of Westchester County in southeastern New York with NY 119 highlighted in red

Route information
- Maintained by NYSDOT, Westchester County, and the city of White Plains
- Length: 6.06 mi (9.75 km)
- Existed: 1930–present

Major junctions
- West end: I-87 / I-287 / New York Thruway / US 9 in Tarrytown
- I-87 / I-287 / New York Thruway in Tarrytown and Greenburgh; Saw Mill River Parkway in Elmsford; I-287 in Greenburgh; NY 100 / Bronx River Parkway in White Plains
- East end: NY 22 in White Plains

Location
- Country: United States
- State: New York
- Counties: Westchester

Highway system
- New York Highways; Interstate; US; State; Reference; Parkways
← NY 118	→ NY 120

New York State Route 119 (NY 119) is an east–west state highway in Westchester County, New York, in the United States. The road starts in Tarrytown at an intersection with U.S. Route 9 (US 9) and comes to an end at a junction with NY 22 in White Plains. The road is a major thoroughfare in the county and provides access to the New York State Thruway, Saw Mill River Parkway, Sprain Brook Parkway and Bronx River Parkway, four of the major roads in the county. NY 119 closely parallels Interstate 287 (I-287) and connects to the highway multiple times. The route was assigned in the 1930 renumbering of state highways in New York and once had a spur route, NY 119A. That highway is now part of NY 120.

== Route description ==
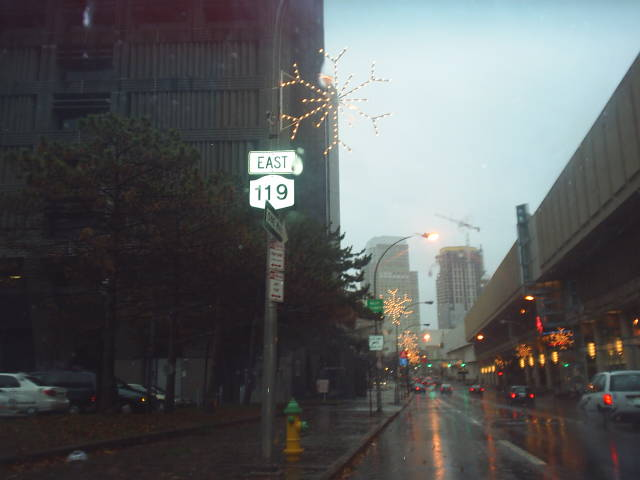
NY 119 eastbound in downtown White Plains

NY 119 begins at an intersection with US 9 in the village of Tarrytown, near an interchange with the New York State Thruway (I-87 and I-287). The route heads east, following the four-lane White Plains Road through a mostly residential area of the village. At the village line, the highway widens to six lanes ahead of a more commercialized area of the town of Greenburgh. NY 119 continues through this area to the western edge of the village of Elmsford, where it meets I-87 and I-287 at an interchange just east of where the two Interstate Highways split. NY 119 continues into Elmsford, becoming Main Street and narrowing to four lanes as it connects to the Saw Mill River Parkway at an interchange just west of the village center.

The route heads across Elmsford on a northwest–southeast alignment, passing several densely populated blocks of homes and meeting NY 9A at Central Avenue (also known as Saw Mill River Road) before it passes under the Sprain Brook Parkway at the eastern edge of the village. Outside of Elmsford, NY 119 becomes Tarrytown Road as it maintains a southeasterly alignment through the rest of the commercialized town of Greenburgh. It roughly parallels I-287 to a junction with NY 100 near the White Plains city line. NY 100 turns east here, following NY 119 for the next 0.75 miles (1.21 km). Along this stretch, the highway splits to become a four-lane divided highway.

NY 100 leaves NY 119 just inside the White Plains city limits at Central Avenue; however, NY 119 continues on, paralleling the Bronx River for four blocks to a partial interchange with the Bronx River Parkway. At this point, NY 119 splits to follow a one-way couplet through downtown White Plains. Eastbound NY 119 is routed along Main Street and is maintained by the city of White Plains, while westbound NY 119 is routed on Hamilton Avenue and is maintained by Westchester County as the unsigned County Route 52 (CR 52). The couplet and the route end at junctions with NY 22 (Post Road) on the eastern edge of the downtown district. NY 119 connects to I-287 and NY 127 at its eastern terminus via the 0.4-mile (0.6 km), unsigned CR 71 (known locally as Westchester Avenue). The portion of the route west of the one-way couplet in White Plains is maintained by the New York State Department of Transportation (NYSDOT).

== History ==
NY 119 was established as part of the 1930 renumbering of state highways in New York and originally ran 13 miles (21 km) from Tarrytown through White Plains to Port Chester. The old route east of White Plains utilized Westchester Avenue, which is now designated as CR 62 between NY 127 and NY 120 and as NY 120A east of NY 120. Originally, NY 120 continued south past Westchester Avenue to Rye, as it does today. It was realigned c. 1939 to follow Westchester Avenue east to Port Chester, creating an overlap with NY 119. NY 120's former alignment to Rye became NY 119A.

In early 1961, the Cross Westchester Expressway (I-287) was opened to traffic, utilizing the Westchester Avenue corridor from White Plains to just west of Port Chester. Westchester Avenue itself was split into two one-way highways located on both sides of the new freeway, essentially converting Westchester Avenue into a pair of service roads. NY 119 was moved onto both directions of the reconfigured Westchester Avenue and truncated to end at Purchase Street (NY 120) following the opening of the expressway. It was cut back to the junction of I-287 and NY 127 by the following year and to its current eastern terminus in White Plains in the 1970s.

== NY 119A ==
New York State Route 119A
- Location: Rye city–Rye Brook
- Existed: c. 1939–October 1960

NY 119A was a short spur off of NY 119 connecting US 1 in Rye to NY 119 and NY 120 (now NY 120A) near Rye Brook. The route was assigned c. 1939 and became part of a realigned NY 120 in October 1960.

== Major intersections ==
The entire route is in Westchester County.

Location	mi	km	Destinations	Notes
Tarrytown	0.00	0.00	I-87 south / I-287 east / New York Thruway south / US 9 – New York City, White Plains	Western terminus; exit 9 on I-87 / I-287 / Thruway
Tarrytown	0.25	0.40	I-87 north / I-287 west / New York Thruway north – Tappan Zee Bridge	Exit 9 on I-87 / I-287 / Thruway
Elmsford	1.83	2.95	I-87 / I-287 / New York Thruway – Tappan Zee Bridge	Exit 8A on I-87 / Thruway; exit 1 on I-287
Elmsford	2.33	3.75	Saw Mill River Parkway	Exits 21E-W on Saw Mill River Parkway
Elmsford	2.41	3.88	NY 9A (Saw Mill River Road)	
Elmsford	3.42	5.50	NY 100A – Hartsdale	Diamond interchange
Town of Greenburgh	4.11	6.61	NY 100B west – Ardsley	Eastern terminus of NY 100B; hamlet of Fairview
Town of Greenburgh	4.24	6.82	NY 100 north	Western end of NY 100 concurrency; hamlet of Fairview
Town of Greenburgh			I-287	Westbound exit and eastbound entrance; exit 5 on I-287; former I-487
White Plains	4.73	7.61	NY 100 south / Bronx River Parkway – Yonkers	Access to Bronx Parkway via Central Avenue; eastern end of NY 100 concurrency; exit 22 on Bronx Parkway
White Plains			Bronx River Parkway south	Exit 21 on Bronx River Parkway
White Plains	6.06	9.75	NY 22 to I-287	Eastern terminus
1.000 mi = 1.609 km; 1.000 km = 0.621 mi: Concurrency terminus; Incomplete access

== See also ==
- List of county routes in Westchester County, New York
