= U.S. Route 1 in New York =

Section of U.S. Route in New York state

U.S. Route 1
- US 1 highlighted in red

Route information
- Maintained by NYSDOT, PANYNJ, NYCDOT, and the cities of New Rochelle and Rye
- Length: 21.54 mi (34.67 km)
- Existed: 1926–present

Major junctions
- South end: I-95 / US 1-9 / US 46 at the New Jersey state line in Fort Lee, NJ
- US 9 / NY 9A / Henry Hudson Parkway in Washington Heights; Harlem River Drive in Washington Heights; I-87 in Morris Heights; Bronx River Parkway / Pelham Parkway in Bronx Park; Hutchinson River Parkway in Pelham Manor; I-95 in New Rochelle; I-95 / I-287 in Rye
- North end: US 1 at the Connecticut state line in Port Chester

Location
- Country: United States
- State: New York
- Counties: New York, Bronx, Westchester

Highway system
- United States Numbered Highway System; List; Special; Divided; New York Highways; Interstate; US; State; Reference; Parkways
← NY 990V	→ NY 1A

U.S. Route 1 (US 1) is a part of the U.S. Highway System that extends from Key West, Florida, to the Canada–United States border at Fort Kent, Maine. In the U.S. state of New York, US 1 extends 21.54 miles (34.67 km) from the George Washington Bridge in Manhattan to the Connecticut state line at Port Chester. It closely parallels Interstate 95 (I-95) for much of its course and does not serve as a major trunk road within the state. It is not concurrent with any other highways besides I-95 and (briefly) US 9, and few other state highways intersect it.

It travels through a variety of different terrain within the city and Westchester County, from the Cross Bronx Expressway to several important surface roads in the northwestern Bronx and then the main street of the Westchester suburbs along Long Island Sound. In many of the latter communities, it begins to intermittently follow the route of the historic Boston Post Road and often still carries that name.

US 1 was designated as part of the 1926 establishment of the U.S. Highway System. It was first signed in New York in 1927, replacing New York State Route 1 (NY 1), a route assigned three years earlier as part of the creation of the modern New York state route system.

== Route description ==
US 1 enters New York concurrent with I-95 and US 9, but returns to a solo surface route a short distance into the Bronx. It remains a busy urban and suburban artery all the way to Connecticut, often four lanes wide and serving as the main street of many of the communities it passes through once it leaves the city. I-95 returns to close proximity in the suburbs as well, and the two roads intersect twice.

=== New York City ===
US 1 enters Manhattan on the George Washington Bridge together with I-95 and US 9. The concurrency between US 1 and US 9 that began at Woodbridge 31 miles (50 km) to the south ends at the first exit, when US 9 splits to the north to follow Broadway. The expressway continues another mile (1.6 km), crossing under several buildings in short tunnels before crossing the Harlem River via the Alexander Hamilton Bridge into the Bronx. It is bookended by an exit to the Harlem River Drive on the west and the Major Deegan Expressway (I-87) on the east.

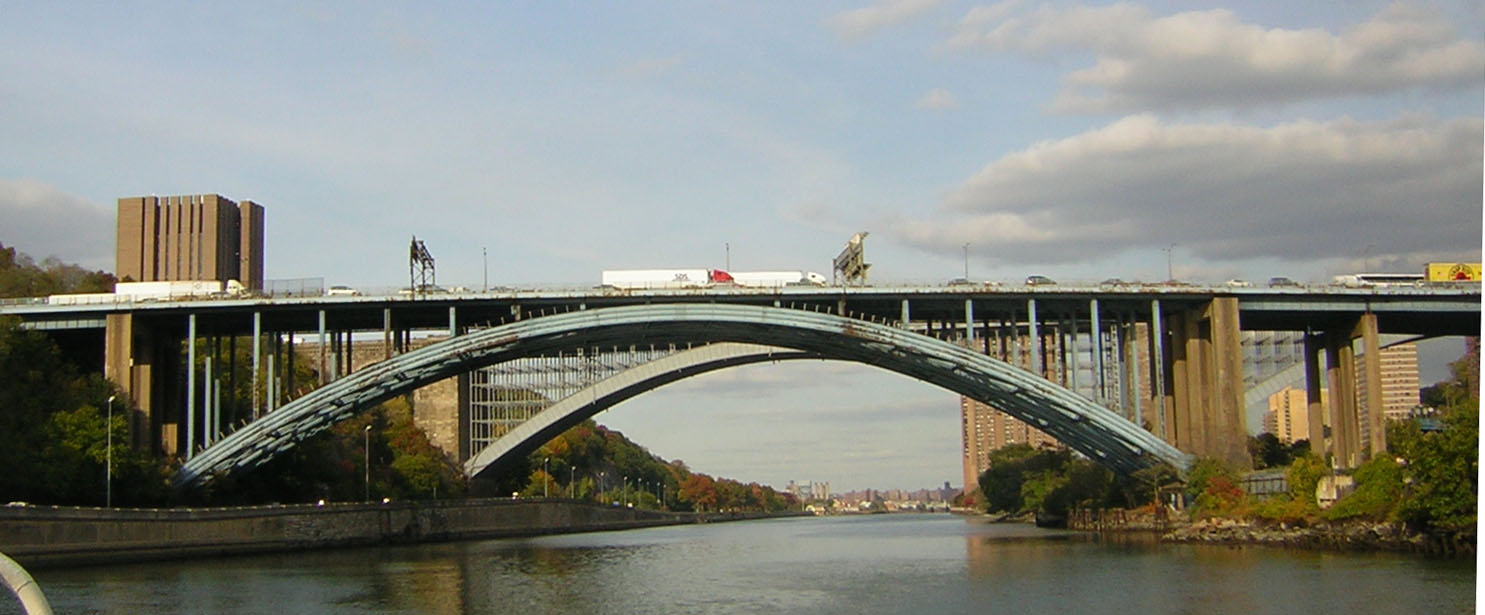
The Alexander Hamilton Bridge

The busy highway, now known as the Cross Bronx Expressway, continues another two miles (3.2 km) until US 1 leaves it at Webster Avenue, one of the Bronx's longest streets, in the Tremont section of the borough, on a northerly heading. A mile and a half (2.4 km) beyond the Cross Bronx, US 1 turns right (east) onto Fordham Road, near the eponymous university. At this busy transportation hub, the road also crosses Metro-North Railroad at Fordham station. Due to the prohibition of left turns from Fordham Road to Webster Avenue, southbound traffic on US 1 requires taking a detour onto Washington Avenue and East 189th Street.

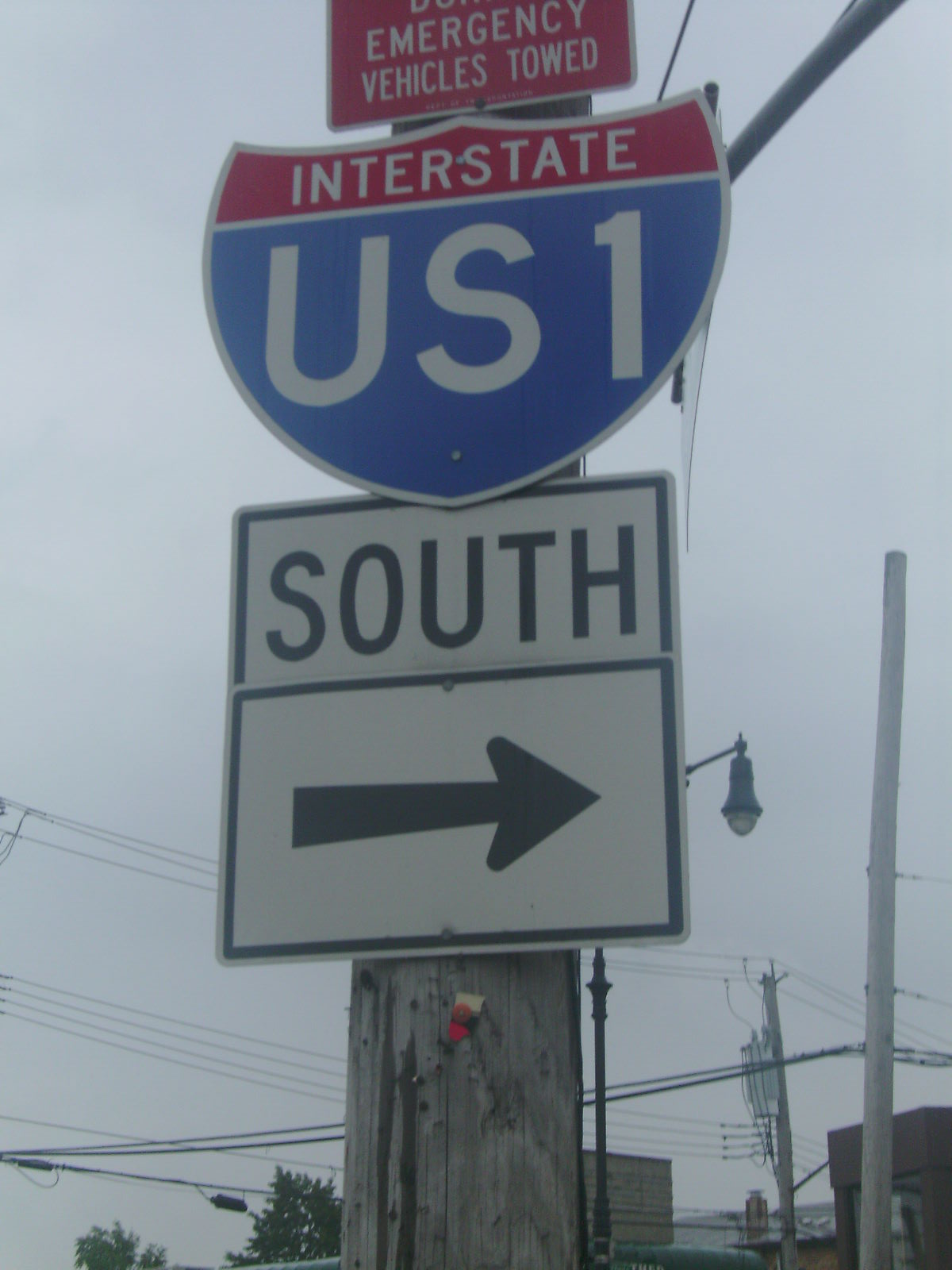
Erroneous "Interstate US1" shield at the intersection between US 1 and Gun Hill Road. This sign has since been removed.

US 1's eastward heading trends to the south as it enters Bronx Park a mile (1.6 km) to the east, after a complex junction with Southern Boulevard. In the park, it crosses the Bronx River, where it trends back to the north again, and has a full cloverleaf interchange with the Bronx River Parkway. Immediately following that, it turns north on Boston Road, the first section of the Boston Post Road it follows into Connecticut. This slants northeast across the eastern outskirts of Williamsbridge past Gun Hill Road into Eastchester, where it starts to veer eastward again, to a route more closely parallel with I-95. At Provost Avenue, NY 22, New York's longest north–south route, starts a journey to the Canada–United States border. After leaving Provost Avenue, US 1 then crosses the Eastchester Bridge named for the neighborhood it passes through. The bridge passes over the Hutchinson River and then descends toward Ropes Avenue to the south, where it leaves New York City.

=== Westchester County ===
One-quarter mile (0.40 km) into the village of Pelham Manor, the Hutchinson River Parkway crosses over, with access available in both directions. Now Boston Post Road, it crosses the village and, another mile (1.6 km) to the northeast, has another interchange at I-95 (now the New England Thruway) just after entering New Rochelle at Pelham Country Club. Just after that it crosses under Amtrak's Northeast Corridor.

A mile (1.6 km) past that junction, in New Rochelle's busy downtown, US 1 divides, with northbound traffic staying on Main Street while Huguenot Street takes southbound drivers. The roads rejoin after another mile, at Pratt Street, as the surrounding neighborhood becomes more residential. New Rochelle gives way to Larchmont after another mile (1.6 km) and returns to being Boston Post Road. A mile and a half (2.4 km) later, after passing through downtown, NY 125, a short route to White Plains, leaves to the north at Weaver Street. The junction with NY 125 is just north of the Larchmont village limits.

After another few blocks, US 1 comes to the Mamaroneck town line. Here, it comes closer to Long Island Sound when it passes Harbor Island Park a mile (1.6 km) from the municipal boundary, and then enters the village at Mamaroneck Avenue. A mile (1.6 km) past that junction and downtown, NY 127, also bound for White Plains, forks left at Keeler Avenue as US 1 itself begins to trend more to the east into Rye, passing Rye Neck High School at the town line.

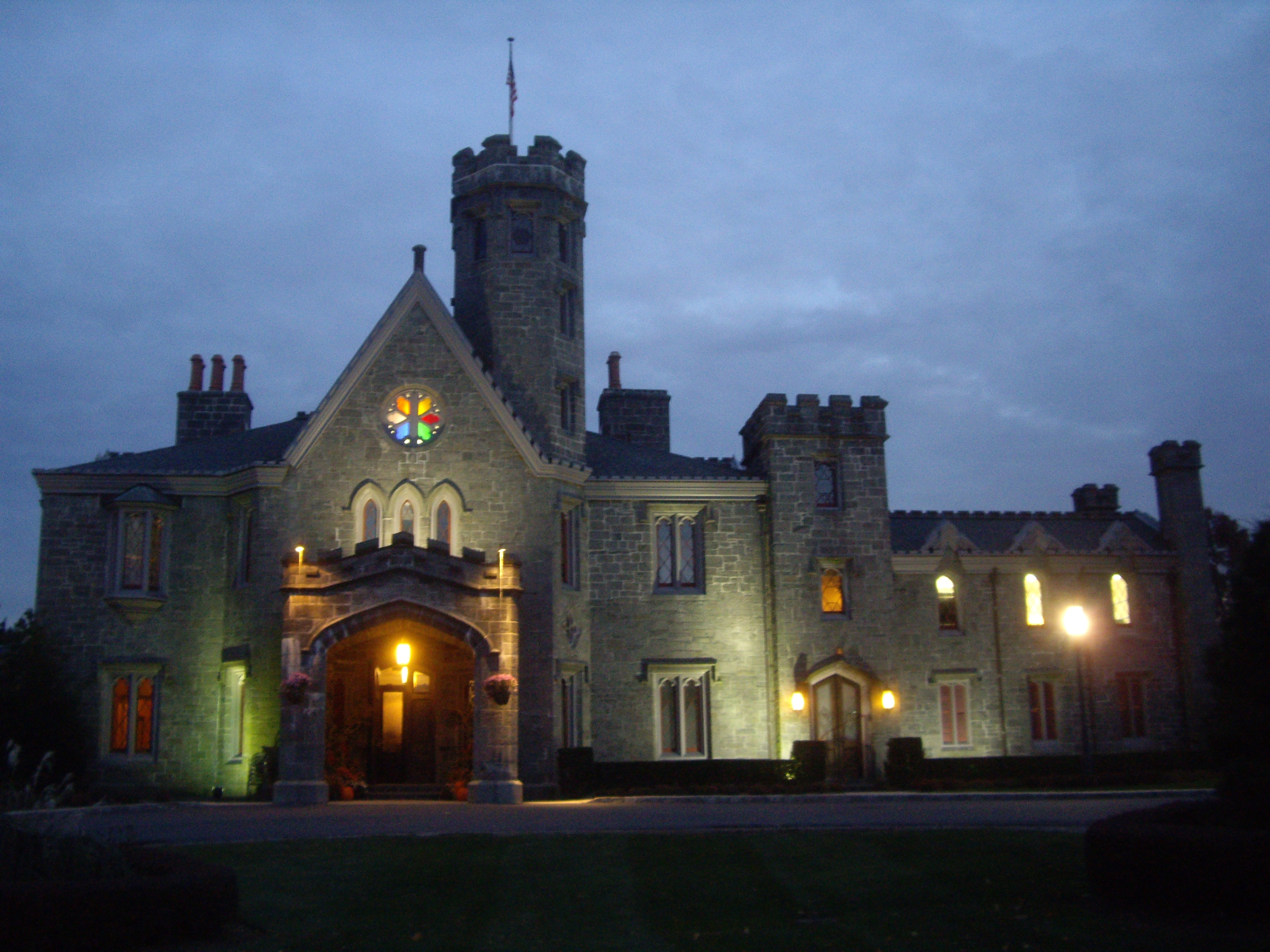
Whitby Castle, part of the Boston Post Road Historic District in Rye

To the right of the wooded area to the north is the Boston Post Road Historic District, a National Historic Landmark (NHL) characterized by mansions and homes that have remained unchanged since before the Civil War including the Jay Estate, Lounsberry, and Whitby Castle. The road begins to head more to the north after passing it and Rye Golf Club, to its interchange with Playland Parkway, which leads to the popular amusement park, Rye's other NHL.

One mile (1.6 km) past this junction, US 1 crosses downtown Rye, where NY 120 forks off to the north at Purchase Street, and then passes through the junction that marks the eastern terminus of I-287, the Cross Westchester Expressway, crossing it and I-95 again in the process, with access to both. Immediately afterward it enters Port Chester, its last community in New York.

It curves a bit toward the east here, crossing the railroad tracks again after an industrial area, then turning left on South Main Street to follow a more northern route through the working-class city's busy downtown, where NY 120A touches at Westchester and King streets to eventually follow the New York–Connecticut border back to its parent route.

Now North Main Street, US 1 continues through downtown Port Chester to cross under the tracks again. Traffic lessens here as the neighborhood grows less commercial, and, a half-mile (0.80 km) later, at Putnam Avenue, the road crosses the Byram River into Greenwich, Connecticut, at the beginning of a brief split (southbound traffic enters New York on Hillside Avenue).

== History ==
US 1 roughly follows the old Boston Post Road, an early colonial highway between New York City and Boston originally laid out in 1673 for transporting mail and later utilized for stage coach travel. The old Boston Post Road began in Lower Manhattan and went north across the length of Manhattan. It crossed into the mainland on Kingsbridge, then continued through a largely abandoned road to Williamsbridge, then across the northern part of the Bronx along Bussing Avenue. It then continued into Westchester County along Kingsbridge Road, South Columbus Avenue, Colonial Avenue, and Kings Highway to present US 1. From there, the old Boston Post Road roughly followed modern US 1 into Connecticut. By 1797, a new bridge over the Harlem River, approximately at the site of the Third Avenue Bridge, had been constructed. This significantly shortened the route out of Manhattan and this new alignment became the preferred route. The new alignment used Third Avenue and Boston Road in the Bronx, then continued along modern US 1 through Westchester County.

In 1800, the Westchester Turnpike company was chartered to build and maintain a toll road between New York City and Connecticut. The company straightened out the old Boston Post Road in Westchester County to more or less the modern alignment of US 1. By the middle of the 19th century, most of the toll roads had been dissolved and the roads reverted to public management. In the beginning of the 20th century, the state highway system was established in New York and most of the main thoroughfares came under the control of the New York State Department of Highways. Highways were first publicly marked with route numbers in 1924. The old Westchester Turnpike alignment was designated as NY 1, which matched the route number across the Connecticut state line. NY 1 ended at the New York city limits since roads in the city were not under the control of the New York State Department of Highways.

In 1926, the U.S. Highway System was established. US 1 in New York was designated from Jersey City, New Jersey, through New York City and lower Westchester, to Greenwich, Connecticut. Old NY 1 was incorporated into the new US 1. However, because New York city did not post route numbers, US 1 ended at the 42nd Street Ferry landing in Weehawken (where the old Lincoln Highway crossed into the city) and resumed again at the Bronx–Westchester boundary. By 1928, the Holland Tunnel opened and the end of US 1 on the New Jersey side was moved there.

For several years, the Automobile Club of New York had been lobbying New York City to sign state highways within the city, including US 1. Their proposal was to sign US 1 from the Holland Tunnel, then along Houston Street and Second Avenue, then crossing the Harlem River along the Willis Avenue Bridge, then via Southern Boulevard, West Farms Road, and Boston Road. In December 1934, New York City finally agreed to sign routes within the city. By this time, the new George Washington Bridge had opened, and it was decided that US 1 and US 9 would be routed through there. The old proposed US 1 alignment through Manhattan became NY 1A. When first signed in New York City, US 1 utilized 181st Street, then crossed the Harlem River on the Washington Bridge, and then continued on University Avenue and Fordham Road before continuing on modern US 1. In 1977, US 1 was moved to Webster Avenue and the Cross Bronx Expressway, crossing the Harlem River using the Alexander Hamilton Bridge.

== Suffixed routes ==
US 1 once had as many as three suffixed routes; however, all three were eliminated by the 1960s.

- NY 1A is a former alternate route of US 1 via the Holland Tunnel and Lower Manhattan. It existed from 1934 to c. 1962.
- The NY 1B designation was used for two distinct highways:
  - The first NY 1B was a connector between NY 1A at Pelham Bay Park and US 1 in New Rochelle that utilized Shore Road, Pelham Road, and Echo Avenue. When it was assigned c. 1932, it ended at the New York City line. The route was extended into the Bronx in the late 1930s but removed c. 1941.
  - The second NY 1B is a former designation for the Major Deegan Expressway (now part of I-87). The route was assigned c. 1941 and removed by 1947.
- NY 1X is a former designation for a portion of the Hutchinson River Parkway. It existed from 1941 to 1946.

== Major intersections ==
County	Location	mi	km	Exit	Destinations	Notes
Hudson River		0.00	0.00	–	I-95 south / US 1-9 south (US 46 west) – New Jersey	Continuation into New Jersey at the river's center
Hudson River		0.00	0.00	George Washington Bridge (northbound toll in New Jersey)		
Manhattan	Washington Heights	0.43	0.69	1	NY 9A / Henry Hudson Parkway / West 178th Street (US 9 north)	Northbound left exit and southbound entrance; northern end of US 9 concurrency; exit 14 on Henry Hudson Parkway
Manhattan	Washington Heights	0.43	0.69	1A	NY 9A / Henry Hudson Parkway / West 181st Street – Downtown	Southbound exit and northbound entrance; exit 14 on Henry Hudson Parkway
Manhattan	Washington Heights	1.16	1.87	1B	Harlem River Drive south to FDR Drive south – Manhattan	Northbound exit and southbound entrance; exit 24 on Harlem River Drive
Harlem River		1.24– 1.41	2.00– 2.27	Alexander Hamilton Bridge		
The Bronx	Morris Heights	1.41	2.27	1B	To Amsterdam Avenue	Southbound exit and northbound entrance; access via Washington Bridge
The Bronx	Morris Heights	1.41	2.27	1C-D	I-87 (Major Deegan Expressway) – Albany, Queens, Yankee Stadium	Signed as exits 1C (I-87 north) & 1D (I-87 south); exits 7N and 7S on I-87
The Bronx	Morris Heights	2.08	3.35	2A	Jerome Avenue	
The Bronx	Tremont	2.55	4.10	2B	I-95 north (Cross Bronx Expressway) / Webster Avenue – New Haven	Northbound exit and southbound entrance; northern end of I-95 concurrency
The Bronx	Tremont	2.55	4.10	Northern end of freeway section		
The Bronx	Belmont	4.06	6.53		Fordham Road / Webster Avenue	Former NY 22
The Bronx	Belmont	4.22	6.79		To US 1 south (Webster Avenue)	Access via Washington Avenue
The Bronx	Belmont	4.7	7.6		Bronx Zoo, Fordham University, Botanical Garden	Interchange; access via Southern Boulevard
The Bronx	Bronx Park	5.17	8.32		Bronx River Parkway – White Plains, Soundview Park Pelham Parkway begins	Western terminus of Pelham Parkway; exits 7E & 7W on Bronx River Parkway
The Bronx	Bronx Park	5.35	8.61		Pelham Parkway east – Orchard Beach, City Island	Northern end of Pelham Parkway concurrency; former NY 1B
The Bronx	Williamsbridge	6.78	10.91		Gun Hill Road	
The Bronx	Eastchester	8.42	13.55		NY 22 north (Provost Avenue)	Southern terminus of NY 22
Westchester	Pelham Manor	9.18	14.77		Hutchinson River Parkway – Whitestone Bridge	Exit 4B on Hutchinson River Parkway; former NY 1A
Westchester	New Rochelle	10.38	16.70		I-95	Exit 15 on I-95
Westchester	Town of Mamaroneck	13.97	22.48		NY 125 north (Weaver Street)	Southern terminus of NY 125
Westchester	Village of Mamaroneck	15.77	25.38		NY 127 north (Keeler Avenue)	Southern terminus of NY 127
Westchester	City of Rye	17.94	28.87		Playland Parkway east – Playland	Interchange
Westchester	City of Rye	18.85	30.34		NY 120 north (Purchase Street)	Southern terminus of NY 120; former NY 119A
Westchester	City of Rye	19.1	30.7		To I-95 north – New Haven	Access via Peck Avenue
Westchester	Rye–Port Chester line	19.6	31.5		I-95 south / I-287 west – White Plains	Exit 20 on I-95; exit 11 on I-287
Westchester	Port Chester	20.60	33.15		To NY 120A	Access via Westchester Avenue
Westchester	Port Chester	21.51	34.62		To NY 120A	Access via NY 982C
Westchester	Port Chester	21.55	34.68		US 1 north	Continuation into Connecticut
1.000 mi = 1.609 km; 1.000 km = 0.621 mi: Concurrency terminus; Electronic toll collection; Incomplete access

== See also ==
U.S. Route 1
Previous state: New Jersey	New York	Next state: Connecticut
