= Hutchinson River Parkway =

North–south parkway in southern New York

Hutchinson River Parkway
- Hutchinson River Parkway highlighted in red

Route information
- Maintained by NYCDOT and NYSDOT
- Length: 18.71 mi (30.11 km)
- Existed: 1928–present
- Restrictions: No commercial vehicles; no drivers with learner's permits north of exit 4A

Major junctions
- South end: I-278 / I-678 in Throggs Neck
- I-95 in Baychester and Pelham Bay Park; Cross County Parkway in Mount Vernon and Eastchester; I-287 / I-684 in Harrison
- North end: Route 15 / Merritt Parkway at the Connecticut state line

Location
- Country: United States
- State: New York
- Counties: Bronx, Westchester

Highway system
- New York Highways; Interstate; US; State; Reference; Parkways
← NY 1B	NY 1X	→ US 2

The Hutchinson River Parkway (known colloquially as the Hutch) is a controlled-access parkway in the southern part of the U.S. state of New York. It extends for 18.71 miles (30.11 km) from the Bruckner Interchange in the Throggs Neck section of the Bronx to the New York–Connecticut state line at Rye Brook. The parkway continues south from the Bruckner Interchange as the Hutchinson River Expressway (Note: This name is seldom used in practice, but the distinction is made to show that trucks and commercial vehicles are permitted; with very few exceptions, parkways in the region are limited to passenger vehicles only.) (Interstate 678) and north into Greenwich, Connecticut, as the Merritt Parkway (Connecticut Route 15). The roadway is named for the Hutchinson River, a 10-mile-long (16-kilometer) stream in southern Westchester County that the road follows alongside. The river, in turn, was named for English colonial religious leader Anne Hutchinson.

Construction of the parkway began in 1924 and was completed in 1941. The section of the parkway between Eastern Boulevard (now Bruckner Boulevard) in the Bronx and U.S. Route 1 (US 1) in Pelham Manor was designated as New York State Route 1X (NY 1X) from 1941 to 1946. NY 1A was subsequently realigned to follow the Hutch between Eastern Boulevard and US 1. The NY 1A designation was removed around 1962.

== Route description ==
The road is designated as NY 908A within the Bronx and is maintained by the New York City Department of Transportation (NYCDOT). In Westchester County, the road is designated as NY 907W and is maintained by the New York State Department of Transportation (NYSDOT). Both designations are unsigned reference routes. Like the Bronx River Parkway, the reference route designation of the parkway in Westchester County violates the numbering scheme used by the NYSDOT. The second digit of a reference route designation typically indicates its region. While other reference routes in the county carry a second digit of "8", as Westchester County is located in region 8, the "0" in 907W is indicative of regions 10 and 11, containing Long Island and New York City, respectively.

=== Throggs Neck to Pelham ===
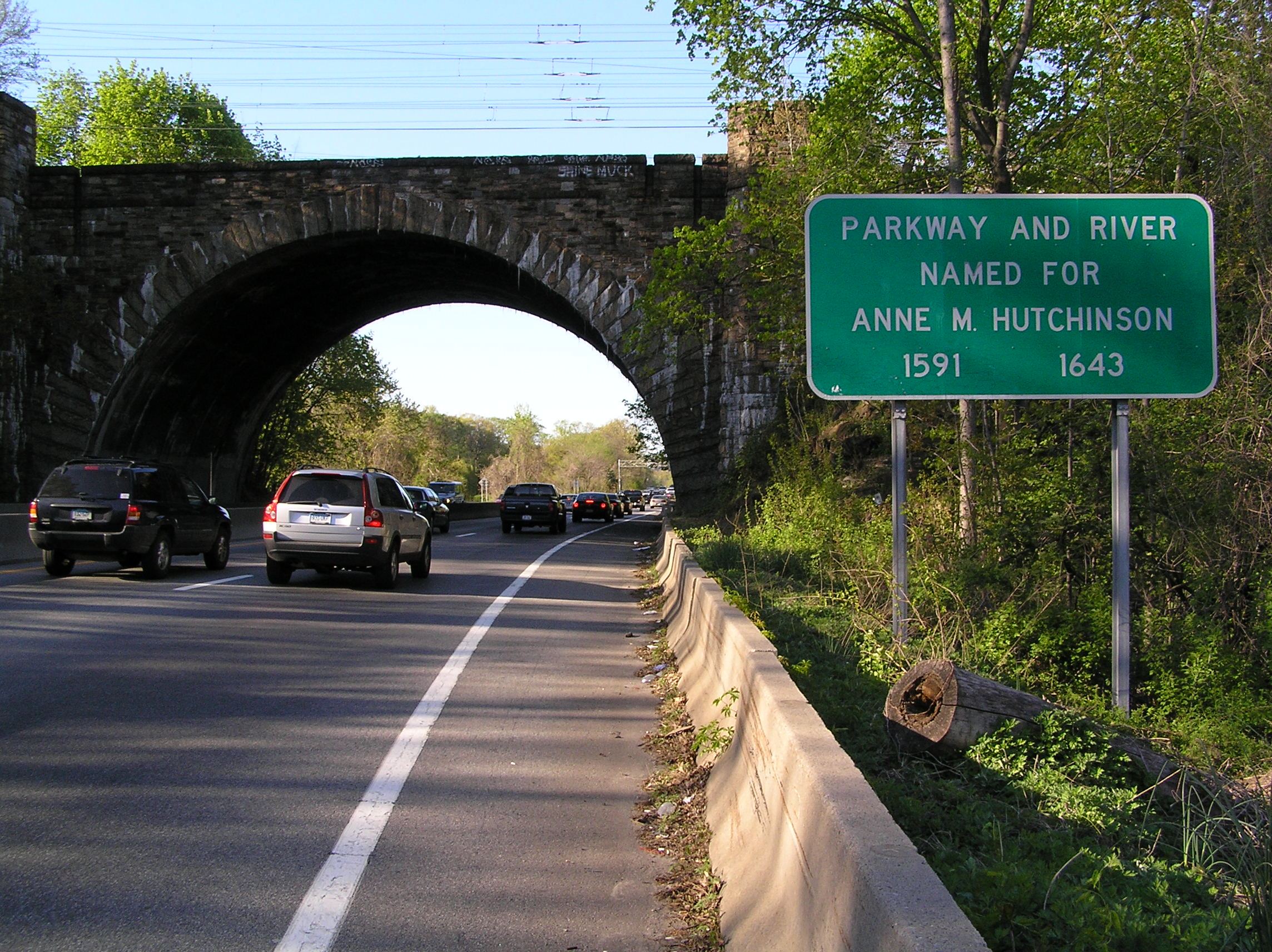
Northbound on the Hutchinson River Parkway in Pelham. Signage present off the shoulder denotes the parkway's namesake, Anne Hutchinson.

The Hutchinson River Parkway begins at the large Bruckner Interchange in the Throggs Neck section of the Bronx. This interchange consists of junctions with the Cross Bronx Expressway (I-95 and I-295), the Hutchinson River Expressway (I-678), and the Bruckner Expressway (I-95 and I-278). The Hutchinson River Parkway proceeds north as a continuation of I-678, entering exit 1A, a small 1-lane ramp to Bruckner Boulevard near Saint Raymond's Cemetery. Just to the north of exit 1A, gas stations appear on each side of the road, which turns northeast and into exit 1B, a connection to East Tremont Avenue. After exit 1B, the parkway crosses under the IRT Pelham Line just west of Middletown Road subway station, crossing into the Pelham Bay section of the Bronx.

Just after crossing into Pelham Bay, the parkway enters exits 1C–D, an interchange with Pelham Parkway in a small section of Pelham Bay Park. After crossing over Amtrak's Northeast Corridor, the parkway crosses out of Pelham Bay Park and into exit 2A–B, a junction with I-95 and the New England Thruway. Crossing over Bartow Avenue and the Hutchinson River, the parkway crosses into the main section of Pelham Bay Park, where exit 3 forks off towards the center of the park. The now six-lane parkway crosses north through Pelham Bay Park, entering exit 4A, another junction with the New England Thruway. When the Hutchinson River Parkway leaves Pelham Bay Park, the right-of-way leaves the Bronx and enters Westchester County. Now in the village of Pelham Manor, the parkway enters exit 4B, an interchange with US 1 (Boston Post Road). Southbound, an exit 5A is present, a ramp to Sandford Boulevard in Pelham Manor. Proceeding northbound, exit 5 connects to Colonial Avenue, the continuation of Sandford Boulevard after the Hutchinson River Parkway in the adjacent village of Pelham. The parkway winds north through Pelham, entering exit 5B on the southbound lanes, a connection to East 3rd Street. Winding northeast, the parkway crosses under the Metro-North Railroad New Haven Line just west of Pelham station. Just after the line, the Hutchinson River Parkway crosses into exit 6A, a bi-directional junction with Lincoln Avenue in Pelham.

=== Mount Vernon to Connecticut ===
Soon the parkway leaves Pelham for Mount Vernon, entering the Chester Heights section. In Mount Vernon, the Hutchinson River Parkway enters exit 6B, a connection to the Cross County Parkway. The parkway winds northeast into exit 7, a junction with New Rochelle Road, bending northwest through Nature Study Woods Park. The parkway then bends north into New Rochelle. Just after crossing into New Rochelle, the Cross County Parkway merges into the northbound lanes. Crossing through Twin Lakes Park, the parkway enters exit 8, a junction with the northern end of Webster Avenue. Passing around Reservoir 3, the Hutchinson River Parkway crosses into Eastchester and soon back into New Rochelle near exit 9, which connects to North Avenue.

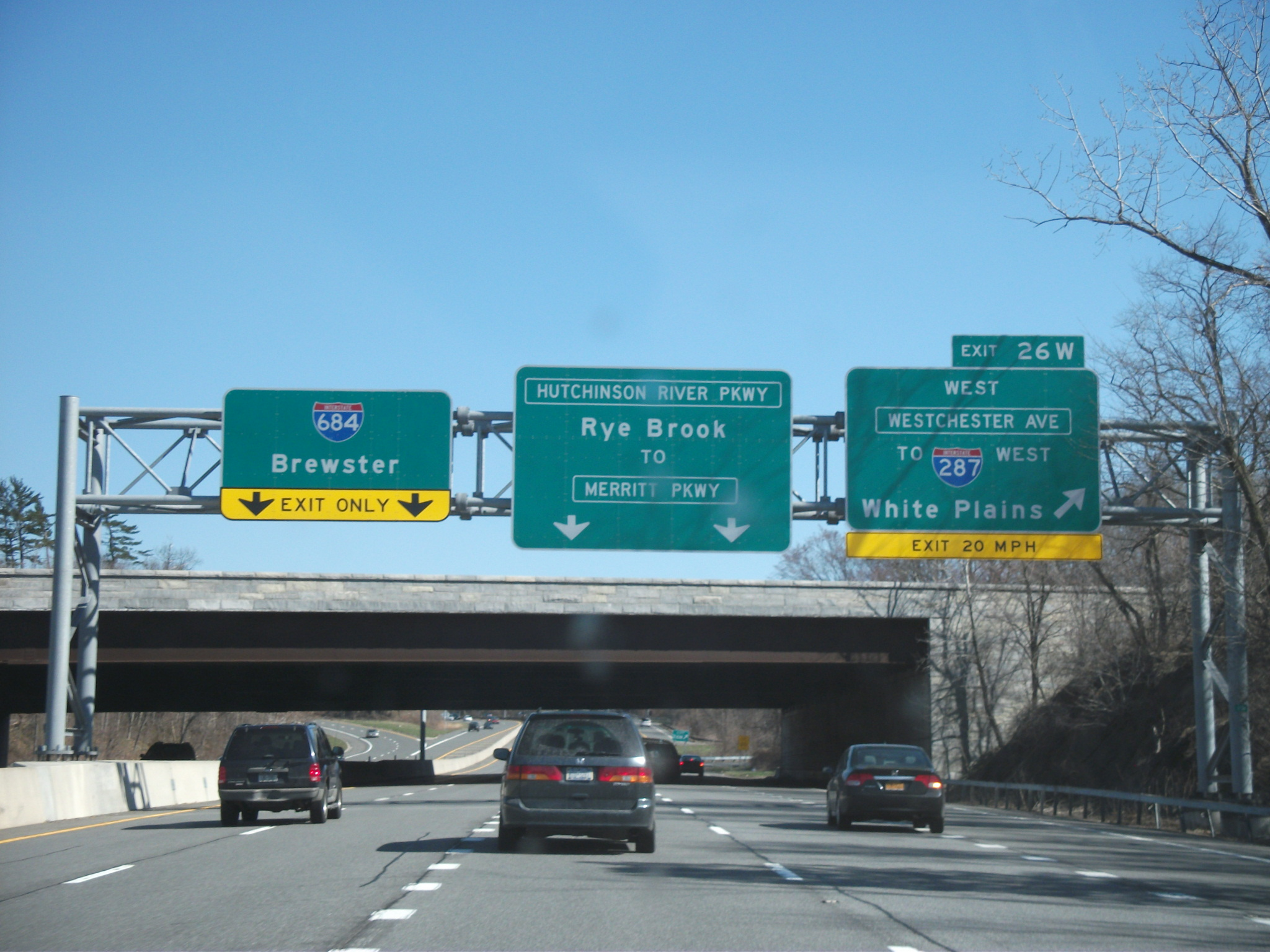
The Hutchinson River Parkway northbound approaching old exit 26W, I-287 west in Harrison. Signage for the upcoming junction of I-684 via NY 984J (new exit 16A) is present.

To the north, exit 9A and exit 9B going southbound junctions with Mill Road in Eastchester, the continuation of North Avenue. After exits 9A and 9B, the parkway passes east of Reservoir 1 and south of exit 9C, Wilmot Road. The Hutchinson River Parkway proceeds northeast as a four-lane freeway through New Rochelle. The parkway crosses under NY 125 (Weaver Street), which is accessible southbound via exit 11. Proceeding northbound, exit 11 services Hutchinson Avenue, which connects to NY 125 and Quaker Ridge Country Club. Now in the Quaker Ridge section of Scarsdale, the Hutchinson River Parkway crosses into exit 12, Mamaroneck Road near Saxon Woods County Park. The parkway runs along the southern end of the park, entering exit 13A-B in the center of the park.

Exit 13A-B services Mamaroneck Avenue as it crosses over the West Branch of the Mamaroneck River. Leaving the park, the Hutchinson River Parkway enters White Plains, crossing past a median rest area. The parkway continues northeast, entering exit 14, a diamond interchange with NY 127 (North Street) in Harrison. Passing Maple Moor Golf Course, the Hutchinson River Parkway enters exit 15A–B, a cloverleaf interchange with I-287 (the Cross Westchester Expressway). Just to the north of the interchange, NY 984J forks to the northwest towards I-684 in Harrison at exit 16A. Just northeast of NY 984J, exit 16B forks to NY 120 (Purchase Street).

After exit 16A-B the parkway makes a bend to the southeast entering exit 17, a junction with Lincoln Avenue in Harrison. The four-lane parkway winds northeast once again, entering exit 18, a junction with North Ridge Street in Rye Brook. The Hutchinson River Parkway enters exit 19A, a connection with NY 120A (King Street). At this interchange, the Hutchinson River Parkway crosses into the state of Connecticut and continues northeast as the Merritt Parkway (Route 15).

== History ==
Construction of the parkway began in 1924 and the first two-mile (3 km) section was completed in December 1927. By October 1928, 11 miles (18 km) of the parkway were open, connecting US 1 in Pelham Manor, New York with Westchester Avenue in White Plains, New York. The original roadway was an undivided freeway, designed with gently sloping curves, stone arch bridges, and wooden lightposts. The original 11-mile (18 km) section included bridle paths along the right-of-way. There was also a riding academy where the public could rent horses.

In 1930, Robert Moses, an American public official who worked on New York metropolitan area infrastructure, announced plans to build more parkways in the Bronx. A southward extension from Pelham Manor to Pelham Bay Park opened on December 11, 1937. The new southerly extension became part of a rerouted New York State Route 1A. The final segment of the parkway—a southward extension to the Bronx–Whitestone Bridge—was completed on October 11, 1941 and was initially designated NY 1X. The NY 1X designation was removed in 1946 and replaced with a realigned NY 1A, which had previously followed Bruckner Boulevard and Shore Road between what is now the Bruckner Interchange and Exit 5 on the Hutch. The NY 1A designation was completely removed c. 1962.

Originally, the parkway was built and designated all the way to the Bronx–Whitestone Bridge, but the original parkway designs did not allow for commercial traffic. When the bridge was designated I-678, the section between the Bruckner Interchange and the Bronx–Whitestone Bridge had to be converted to Interstate Highway standards. Once that was completed in 1972, that section was assigned the I-678 designation and renamed the Hutchinson River Expressway. Modifications in 1984 included the straightening of some curves, increased sight distances, removal of the rustic lightposts, and lengthening of acceleration and deceleration lanes. Originally, there was a 10 cent toll in Pelham between exits 7 and 8. The toll was increased to 25 cents in 1958 and removed on October 31, 1994, with the last toll collected just before midnight. The tolls were abolished on the Saw Mill River and Hutchinson River parkways in November 1994. In mid-2021, the parkway's exit numbers were changed from sequential to mileage-based numbering. In addition, I-684 was assigned an exit number after initially being unsigned, which is Exit 16A.

== Exit list ==
County	Location	mi	km	Old exit	New exit	Destinations	Notes
The Bronx	Throggs Neck	0.00	0.00	0	0	I-678 south (Hutchinson River Expressway) – Whitestone Bridge, Queens, Kennedy Airport	Continuation beyond Bruckner Interchange
The Bronx	Throggs Neck			1	1A	I-278 west (Bruckner Expressway) / Bruckner Boulevard to I-95 south (Cross Bronx Expressway) – RFK Bridge	I-95/I-278 not signed northbound; eastern terminus and exit 54 on I-278
The Bronx	Schuylerville	0.70	1.13	2	1B	East Tremont Avenue / Westchester Avenue	
The Bronx	Pelham Bay	1.93	3.11	3	1D-C	Pelham Parkway	Signed as exits 1C (Pelham Parkway east) & 1D (Pelham Parkway west); former NY 1B
The Bronx	Baychester	2.36	3.80	4	2	I-95 south / Stillwell Avenue – George Washington Bridge To I-95 north – New Haven	Signed as exits 2A (I-95 south) & 2B (I-95 north); southbound exit and northbound entrance; exit 9 on I-95; access to I-95 north via Baychester Avenue
The Bronx	Baychester	2.7	4.3	4	2	Bartow Avenue	Northbound exit only
The Bronx	Hutchinson River	2.90	4.67	Hutchinson River Drawbridge			
The Bronx	Pelham Bay Park	3.35	5.39	5	3	Orchard Beach, City Island	Access via Orchard Beach/Shore Roads
The Bronx	Pelham Bay Park	4.20	6.76	6	4A	I-95 north – New Haven	Northbound exit and southbound entrance; exit 14 on I-95
Westchester	Pelham Manor	4.54	7.31	7	4B (NB) 4 (SB)	US 1 (Boston Post Road) – Pelham Manor, New Rochelle	Signed as exit 4B northbound. Signed as Boston Road northbound; New Rochelle not signed northbound
Westchester	Pelham Manor	5.20	8.37	8	5A	Sanford Boulevard – Mount Vernon, Pelham Manor	Southbound exit and entrance
Westchester	Village of Pelham	5.31	8.55	9	5	Wolfs Lane – Mount Vernon, Pelham	Northbound exit and entrance
Westchester	Village of Pelham	5.53	8.90	10	5B	East Third Street – Mount Vernon, Pelham	Southbound exit only
Westchester	Pelham–Mount Vernon line	6.29	10.12	12	6A (NB) 6 (SB)	East Lincoln Avenue – Mount Vernon, Pelham	Signed as exit 6A northbound
Westchester	Pelham–Mount Vernon line	6.67	10.73	13	6B	Cross County Parkway west to Saw Mill River Parkway – Yonkers	Northbound exit and southbound entrance; exit 9 on Cross County Parkway
Westchester	Pelham–Mount Vernon line	7.11	11.44	14	7	Hutchinson Boulevard – Mount Vernon	Southbound exit and entrance
Westchester	Pelham–Mount Vernon line	7.11	11.44	14	7	Pelhamdale Avenue / New Rochelle Road – New Rochelle	Northbound exit and entrance
Westchester	Eastchester	7.95	12.79	15	8	Cross County Parkway west – George Washington Bridge	Southbound exit and northbound entrance; eastern terminus of Cross County Parkway
Westchester	New Rochelle	8.56	13.78	16	8	Webster Avenue – New Rochelle	No southbound exit
Westchester	New Rochelle	8.94	14.39	17 18	9	North Avenue – New Rochelle, Eastchester	Northbound exit and entrance
Westchester	New Rochelle	9.30	14.97	17 18	9	Mill Road – New Rochelle, Eastchester	Southbound exit and entrance; signed as exits 9A (Mill Road east) & 9B (Mill Road west)
Westchester	New Rochelle	9.90	15.93	19	9C	Wilmot Road – New Rochelle	Southbound exit and northbound entrance
Westchester	New Rochelle–Scarsdale line	11.10	17.86	20 (SB); 21 (NB)	11	NY 125 (Weaver Street) – Scarsdale, New Rochelle, Larchmont	No southbound entrance
Westchester	Scarsdale	12.09	19.46	22	12	Mamaroneck Road – Scarsdale, Mamaroneck	
Westchester	Harrison–White Plains line	13.05	21.00	23	13S-N	Mamaroneck Avenue – Mamaroneck, White Plains	Signed as exits 13A (Mamaroneck Avenue south) & 13B (Mamaroneck Avenue north)
Westchester	Harrison–White Plains line	14.57	23.45	25	14	NY 127 (North Street) – White Plains, Harrison	
Westchester	Harrison	15.69– 16.01	25.25– 25.77	26A-B	15W-E	I-287 / Westchester Avenue – Rye, White Plains	Cloverleaf interchange; signed as exits 15A (I-287 east) & 15B (I-287 west); exits 9S & 9N on I-287
Westchester	Harrison	15.69– 16.01	25.25– 25.77	26C	16A	To I-684 north – Brewster	Northbound exit and southbound entrance; southbound terminus and exit 1 on I-684; access via NY 984J
Westchester	Harrison	16.41	26.41	27	16B (NB) 16 (SB)	NY 120 (Purchase Street) – Westchester County Airport	Signed as exit 16B northbound; Westchester County Airport not signed northbound
Westchester	Harrison	17.23	27.73	28	17	Lincoln Avenue – Rye Brook, Harrison	
Westchester	Rye Brook	17.96	28.90	29	18	North Ridge Street – Rye Brook	
Westchester	Rye Brook	18.70	30.09	30S (NB); 27S (SB)	19A	NY 120A south (King Street) – Rye Brook, Greenwich, Port Chester	Access to NY 120A north via Merritt Parkway exit 19B; signed for Rye Brook/Greenwich northbound, Port Chester southbound
Westchester	Rye Brook	18.71	30.11	31	19B	Route 15 north / Merritt Parkway north	Continuation into Connecticut
1.000 mi = 1.609 km; 1.000 km = 0.621 mi: Incomplete access
