= Bedford Road Historic District =

Historic district near downtown Armonk, New York

- U.S. National Register of Historic Places
- U.S. Historic district
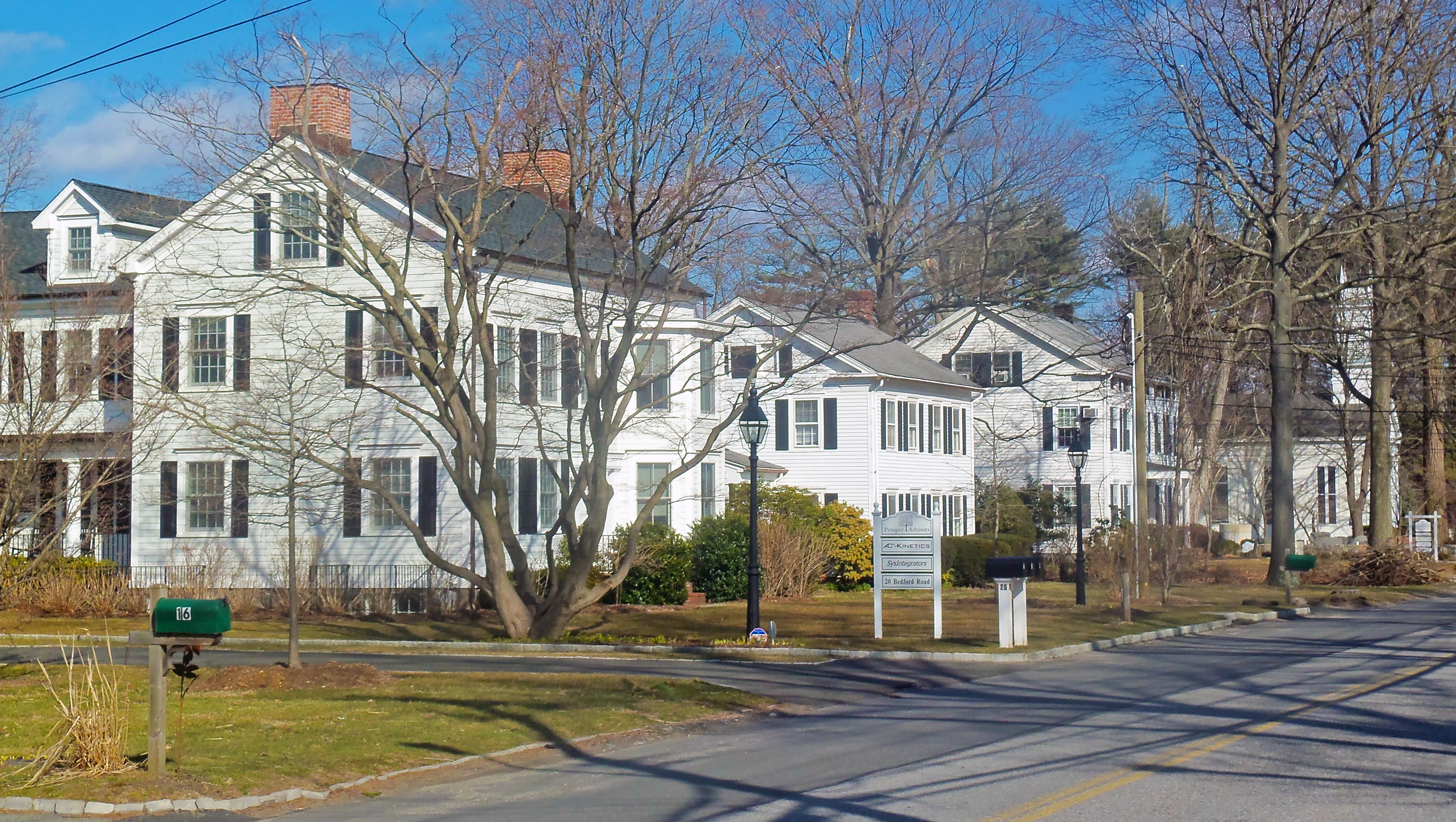
- 24, 30, 40 Bedford Road and St. Stephen's Church, 2013

- Location within New York Location within the United States
- Location: Armonk, New York
- Nearest city: Stamford, Connecticut
- Coordinates: 41°7′31″N 73°42′45″W
- Area: 4.5 acres (1.8 ha)
- Architectural style: Greek Revival, Federal
- NRHP reference No.: 85002903
- Added to NRHP: November 21, 1985

The Bedford Road Historic District is located along that street in the unincorporated hamlet of Armonk, New York, United States. Its 4.5 acres (1.8 ha) contain nine contributing properties, all wood frame buildings from the mid-19th century in variations and combinations of the Federal and Greek Revival architectural styles. In 1985 the group was recognized as a historic district and listed on the National Register of Historic Places.

Armonk's history began with the buildings, erected in the mid-19th century when the congregants of St. Stephen's Episcopal Church, the oldest building in the district, subdivided and sold the large parcel the church was on to their rector in order to give the church a solid financial footing. In selling the land for house construction, the congregation was the first to use the name Armonk for the area, and the properties have likewise been described as the hamlet's first residential subdivision.

Architecturally, the houses and church are a rare surviving group in classically inspired styles in that part of Westchester County. Some are used as professional offices today. The church's cemetery, in which many of the inhabitants of the houses and other early residents of North Castle are buried, is also part of the district.

Since its construction, the district has undergone some changes. Another, smaller house was built within it in the 1880s. The church has gone through several parsonages, one of which has been demolished, along with an additional building used as a girls' school. Highway construction and relocations following IBM's 1964 choice of Armonk for its corporate headquarters changed Bedford Road from a major through route to a dead-end street. In the early 21st century the redevelopment of the land north of the district into Armonk Square, a mixed-use shopping center and apartment complex required the construction of a street in the middle of the district to meet parking requirements, a move which was highly controversial within the community.

== Geography ==
The roughly L-shaped district is located along the north side of the road, in the southern section of downtown Armonk. Its boundaries mostly follow land lot lines, beginning one lot east of Main Street (also New York State Route 128 (NY 128)) and taking in the next seven lots to the west, crossing Elm Street, where 44 Bedford Road, the church's former rectory, now has its frontage, in the process. At Maple Avenue, where St. Stephen's church is located, it extends further north than the other rear lot lines almost to that street's westward turn.

On these lots are 12 buildings, most located on 100-by-200-foot (30 by 61 m) lots. Eight of them—the six houses, one outbuilding and the church—are considered contributing properties to the district's historic character. The church's cemetery is further included as a contributing site. The remaining three buildings are all non-contributing detached modern garages.

Map of the district

To the south of the district, across the street, is North Castle's town hall, a mid-20th century brick Colonial Revival building. It is the center of a municipal complex that includes parking lots, baseball fields and other auxiliary government buildings between Bedford Road and New York State Route 22 (NY 22), at this point a divided four-lane highway, with IBM's corporate headquarters opposite. East of the district is the Wampus River, a tributary of the Byram, buffered on either side by public parks.

Bedford Road continues for 500 feet (150 m) before reaching a dead end at one of the exit ramps for the interchange of Interstate 684 and NY 22. North of the district is the Armonk Square development, a mix of retail and residential properties. The rest of downtown Armonk, a mix of residential buildings on side streets with larger institutional and commercial buildings on and near main, moderately developed with many large interspersed mature shade trees, is to the northwest. The terrain of the district, like downtown as a whole, is level, one of the few large breaks in an otherwise continuously hilly region.

== Buildings ==
Except as noted below, the houses have a number of features in common—timber framing, two stories, side-gabled roofs, modern siding, six-over-six double-hung sash windows with louvered wooden shutters. Also, construction date is ca. 1850 unless noted otherwise.

Two buildings, both former parsonages, that were erected by the church, have since been demolished. One, built across Bedford Road from the church in the 1850s, was demolished almost a century later when the town hall was built. The other, the former home of a girls' school established by the church, was extant at the time of the Register listing but was considered non-contributing due to extensive modifications and deterioration at the time; the district's boundaries were thus drawn to exclude it. It was demolished around 1990 to clear the way for a mixed-use development on the land north of the district where it had been sited, vacant and neglected for several decades.

- 12 Bedford Road: Like its neighbor at 16 Bedford, the westernmost house in the district is on a lot with only 50 feet (15 m) of frontage. It has an asphalt-shingled roof with return eaves pierced by a central brick chimney. On the three-bay south (front) facade is a wraparound veranda with a hipped roof supported by Doric columns with entases; the paneled entrance door has sidelights. A rear addition and detached garage are of more modern construction and non-contributing.
- 16 Bedford Road: Also three bays wide, the next house is the only one with a front gable. At ground level a stone foundation is visible. The Doric pillars support the hipped roof of a front porch. It was moved to its present location in 1888.

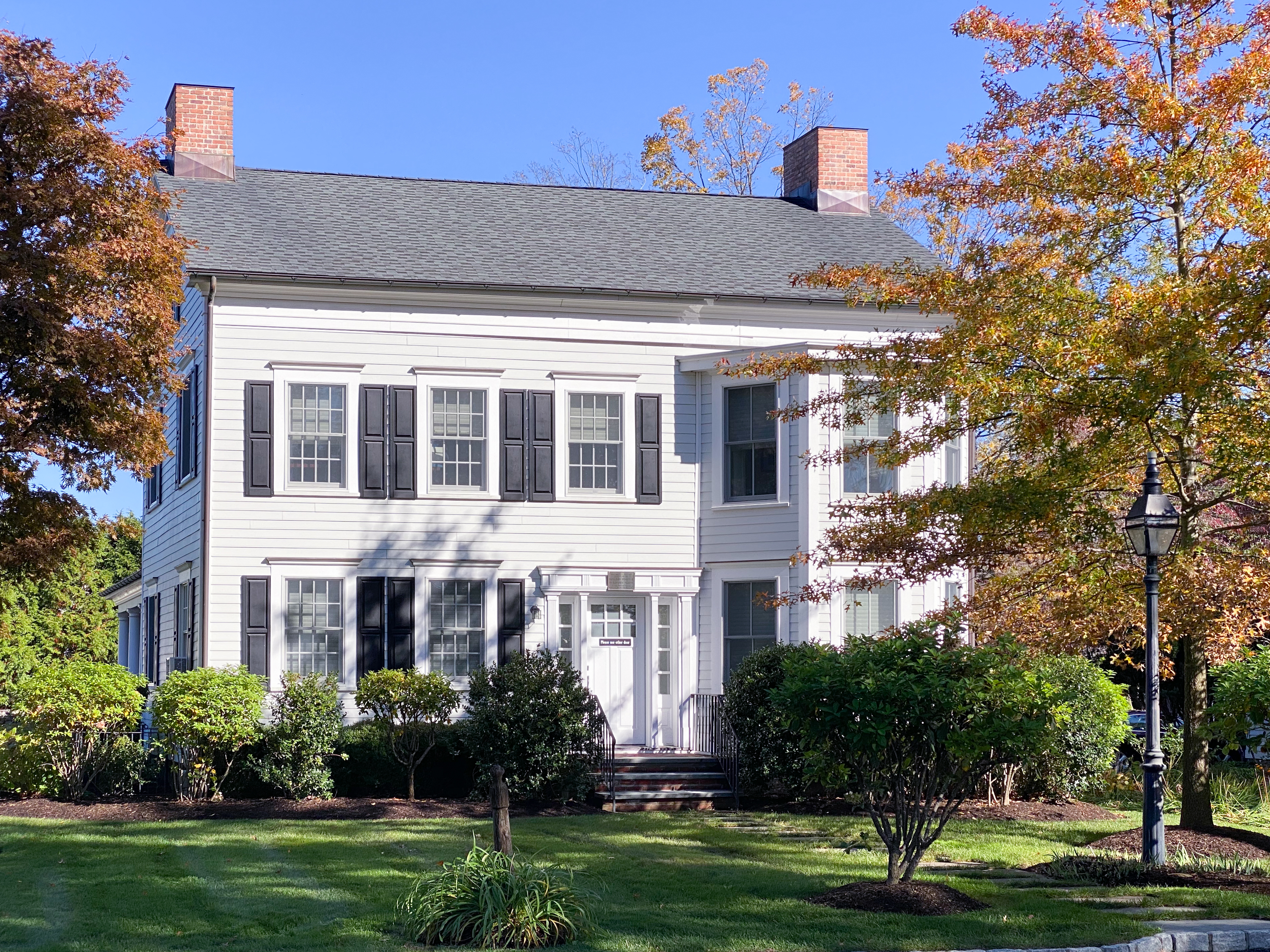
24 Bedford Road; Fall, 2020

- 24 Bedford Road: A driveway separates 16 Bedford from the next house over, a more sophisticated four-by-three-bay structure with a side gable and two brick end chimneys piercing its roof. It has no porch or veranda; however, on the east of the front facade is a two-story bay window with two-over-two double-hung sash, added in 1880. The main entrance, immediately adjacent on the west, has a Greek Revival door surround, sidelights, Doric pilasters and a full Doric entablature. In the house's rear is another modern non-contributing detached garage. Although a historic map shows this lot as 24 Bedford Road, the address in the year 2020 is 20 Bedford Road.
- 30 Bedford Road: Also known as the Nehemiah Searles House, this four-by-three structure retains its original clapboard siding. Its roof is pierced by a single brick chimney at the east end; at the roofline are Yankee gutters and return eaves. Among its windows are some six-light casement windows; all have molded surrounds. The main entrance is on the west side with an enclosed vestibule. Another non-contributing detached modern garage is in the rear.

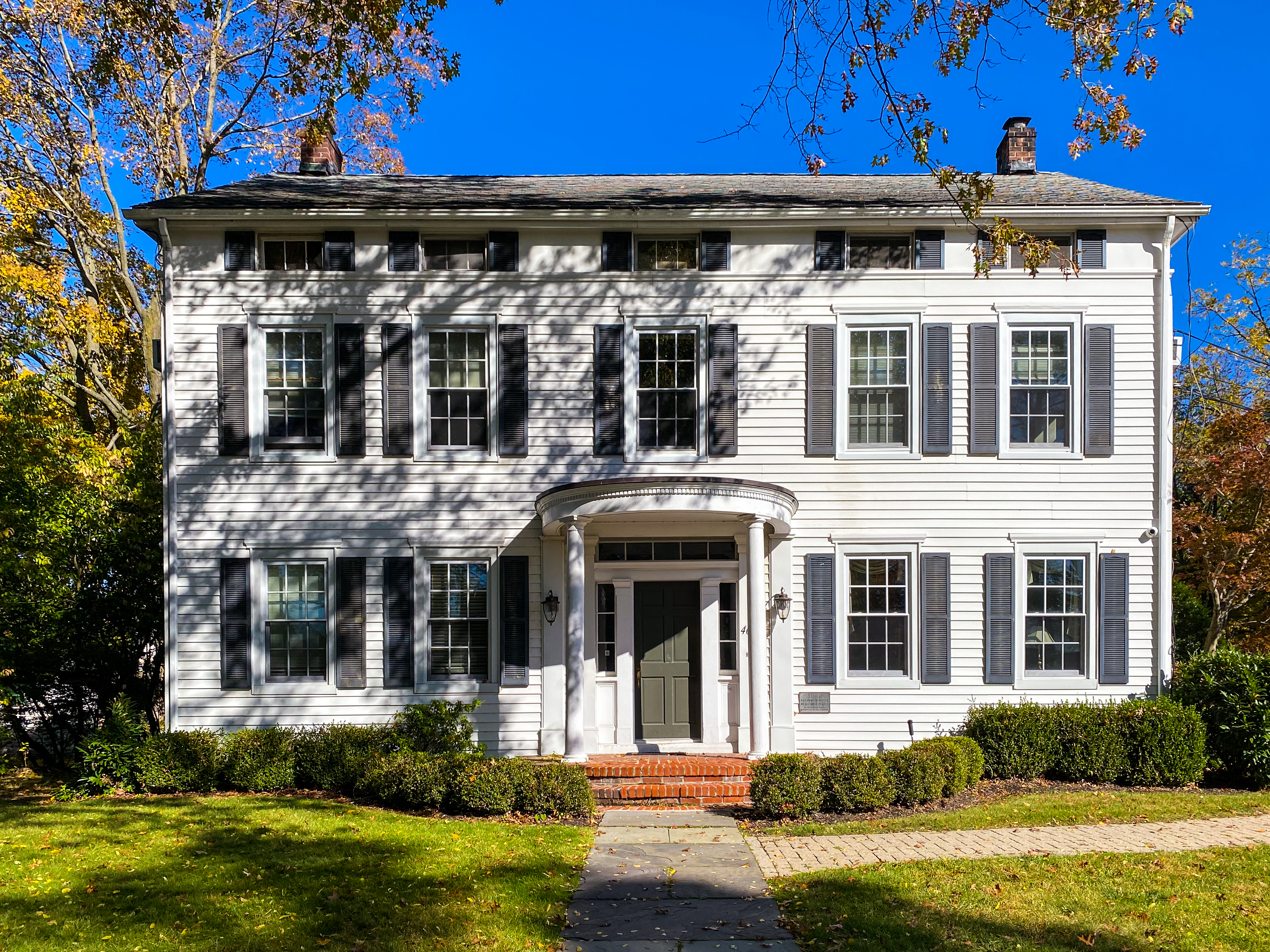
40 Bedford Road; Fall, 2020

- 40 Bedford Road: At two and a half stories this is the tallest of the houses. Two brick end chimneys pierce its roof, which is distinguished by wide fasciae at the roofline above a row of three-light casement eyebrow windows. The centrally located main entrance on the five-bay facade has a semi-circular Colonial Revival porch supported by two pillars with a conical roof. It has a similar door treatment to 24 Bedford, with a transom taking the place of the entablature.

In the rear, north of a parking lot, is the only contributing outbuilding in the district. It is a small timber-frame structure with clapboard siding and a gabled roof on a stone foundation. In the front a small entrance ramp provides access to one of two vertical board doors; there is another one at the west end of the south facade.

- 44 Bedford Road. At the time of the National Register listing, the former rectory for St. Stephen's Church was located at the end of a short driveway. That has since become part of an extended Elm Street; however, the building's address has not been changed and the building's three-bay south (front) facade still faces Bedford Road. It was built in 1880, making it the newest of the district's houses.

This one-and-a-half-story frame structure on a concrete-covered foundation, sided in clapboard and wood shingle with a front-gabled roof, is the smallest of the district's houses. Most of the windows are the same six-over-six double-hung sash as that seen on the other houses; there is one six-light casement on the south. The foundation windows are all three-light casement.

The south facade also has a hip-roofed veranda with exposed rafters. It is supported by turned posts rising from a millwork balustrade. The main entrance, on the west, has a paneled door. On the north side there is a one-story two-by-one-bay shed-roofed addition. It has a secondary entrance.

=== St. Stephen's Episcopal Church ===
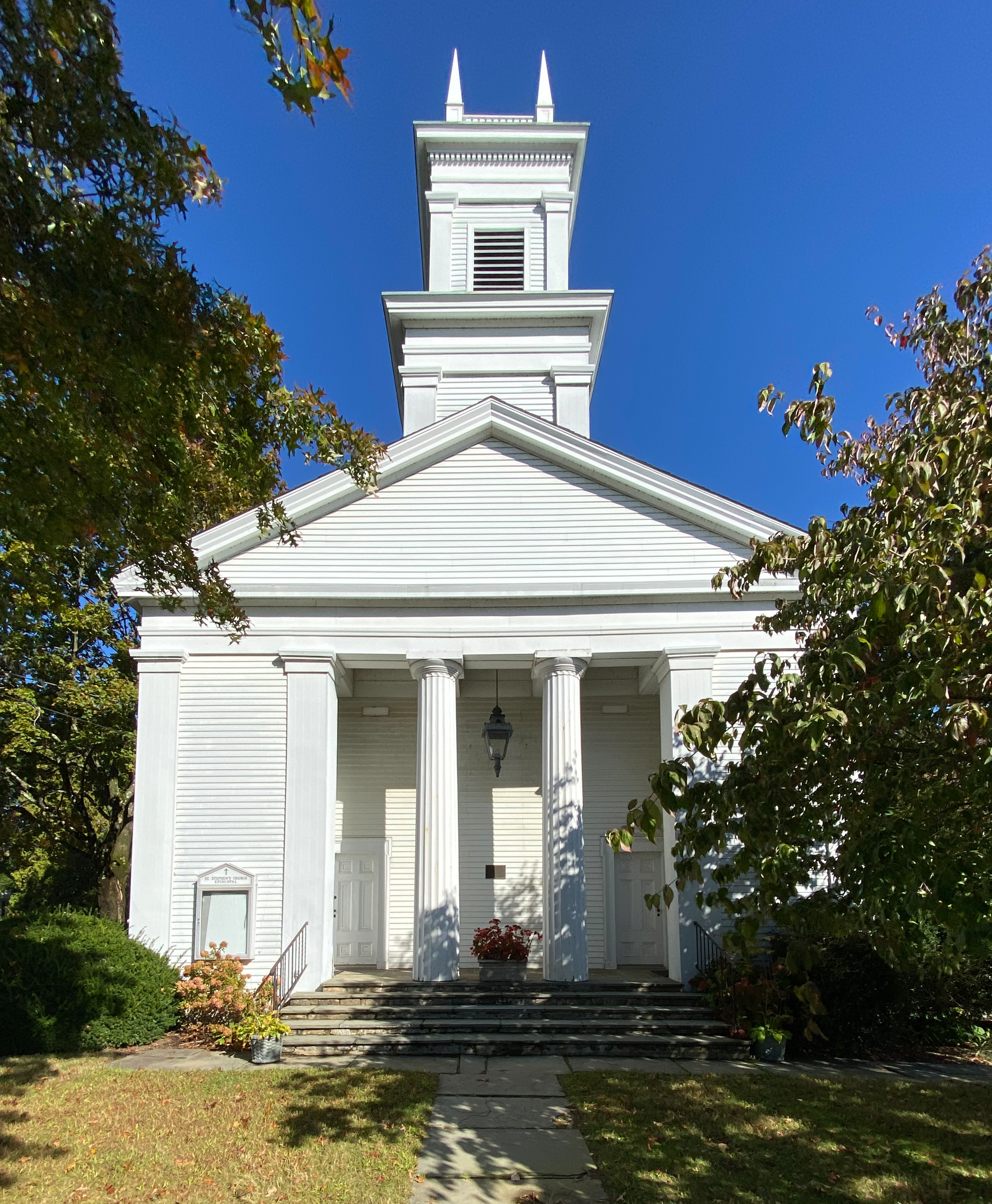
St. Stephen's, 2020

Built in 1842, this Greek Revival church at 50 Bedford Road is the oldest building in the district. Its clapboard-clad facades rise to a front-gabled roof topped by a two-stage tower with belfry. On its north (rear) is a non-contributing mid-20th century Sunday school wing.

The main entrances, on the south facade, are on either side of a recessed porch. Two round fluted Doric columns in antis are in the center, flanked by square Doric pilasters. The porch is topped by a full entablature and pediment.

The tall, narrow rectangular stained glass windows on the east and west sides are set in decorative surrounds. Inside the church has been remodeled in the Gothic Revival style; the pews are arranged so that there is no center aisle. Both stages of the tower have corner pilasters topped by molded cornices with broad overhanging eaves; the second stage has louvered vents. Atop are four narrow wooden steeples connected by a balustrade.

To the rear and west of the church, filling out most of the remainder of its two-acre (8,100 m^{2}) lot, is its cemetery, considered a contributing site to the district. It contains approximately 450 marked graves, dating to 1844 at the earliest. To its south it is bordered by a wood post and rail fence, with a more modern stone fence topped with a wooden rail on the west, parallel to Elm Street. A wire fence sets it off on the east, leaving the north open.

== History ==
The development of the district has until the late 20th century largely been driven by St. Stephen's Church.

=== 1700s–1830: North Castle before the church ===
What is now the Town of North Castle was first settled by Europeans at the beginning of the 18th century. The colonial governor gave the town its name around 1721, when it was first used in records. Pound Ridge was split off from it in 1745. Even so, it still rivaled nearby Bedford as the most populous town in Westchester County as of the first U.S. census in 1790, the year before New Castle was created from the town's former northern portion.

Most of the land in North Castle was ideal for agriculture, and thus the town was primarily known for its large farms. Over the century, a few small settlements had sprung up, such as Banksville, Kensico and Mile Square, the beginnings of today's Armonk. But despite the large and prosperous population, most of whom were of English descent and members of what had, after American independence, become the Episcopal Church, there was as of the early 19th century no house of worship in North Castle. Congregants had to go to Bedford, or other nearby towns such as Mount Kisco or White Plains, for services. A plan that had supposedly in the works in the early 1740s to build a church near the present St. Stephen's location was abandoned. Instead, one was built in 1761 at what is now North Castle Corners.

=== 1831–1842: Establishment and construction of the church ===
This began to change in 1831, when The Rev. Robert William Harris was appointed rector of Grace Church in White Plains, one of those that North Castle residents traveled to for services. He took it upon himself to tend to the area's other congregations that did not have clerical leadership, including a growing group in Mile Square. By 1841 he was conducting informal services in a log cabin near the church's present site.

Late in the following year the church was formally incorporated as St. Stephen's Church North Castle, Westchester County, New York. Harris was appointed its rector. The first order of business was to build a dedicated church, and two of the first committees formed had the tasks of raising money for that project and overseeing its planning and construction.

The church soon settled on a draft plan, and the building committee was expanded. One of its new members, Elisha Sutton, donated a quarter-acre (1,000 m^{2}) from the northeast corner of his farm. After the committee budgeted $2,000 for the construction of the actual church, a vestryman, Ziel Eggleston, donated some of the lumber and built the church for free.

=== 1843–1866: Development of neighboring land ===
With the church erected, the congregation concentrated on two more goals: financial stability and getting a pastor who would be exclusive to St. Stephen's. Harris proposed a way of ensuring both. The congregation should obtain a lot on which it could build a parsonage, or already had a suitable house. It would be owned by the vestrymen and wardens, who could purchase shares for a hundred dollars apiece. Once he was settled in the home, the new pastor would be able to buy back those shares at that same price when he so chose, and thus the house would over time revert to his ownership. He would also have to set up a girls' school in the building.

It took until 1850 to begin to put this plan into action. A 13-acre (5.3 ha) lot to the north and west of the church was purchased from the estate of Sutton, the congregant who had donated the church's original land. It would be subdivided into 40 lots, with two set aside to serve as a burial ground and parsonage (now 40 Bedford Road) respectively. Construction of the house on the latter lot was financed via subscription, to start when two-thirds of the possible subscriptions had been sold; like the church, its budget was capped at $2,000.

The new land soon became known as "the Armonk Square", after the new name of the growing hamlet, derived from the Native American term for the area meaning "a valley or fishing place between hills" that the church officers were using to promote the available land. St. Stephens' officers heavily promoted the lots within it, and the houses to be built on it were expected to cost at least a thousand dollars. In 1852 a new pastor, The Rev. Isaac Dychman Vermilye, was appointed assistant rector and the principal of Chester Female Institute, the girls' school, then run out of the rectory. Early the next year, Rev. Harris resigned the rectorship, and Vermilye replaced him. The church's board also approved a plan to add classroom and dormitory space for at least 32 students to the parsonage; however, a separate structure (no longer extant) was built instead. Two years later the church formally adopted Harris's plan by which Vermilye would come to own the remaining lots and received the proceeds of their sale.

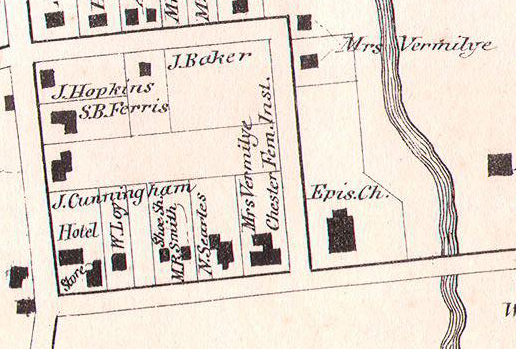
Armonk and the Bedford Road buildings on the 1867 Beers North Castle map

Vermilye served as pastor through his death in 1864. The church prospered during this period, with its congregation including Major Gen. Alexander Hamilton, grandson of his namesake, whose service during the Civil War included commanding the Union Army troops that suppressed the New York City Draft Riots. After his death, the congregation conveyed the house and accompanying lots to his wife Josephine; she continued to operate the Female Institute for several years.

=== 1867–1888: Renovations and other improvements ===
In 1867, Vermilye's successor, The Rev. Cornelius Winter Bolton, referred to as just C.W. Bolton, became rector. In 13 years, he oversaw significant renovations to the church. The original clear glass side windows were replaced with stained glass and the original pew doors were removed. Across the street, he supervised the construction of a new rectory (no longer extant), since Josephine Vermilye was still living in the original one.

The changes to the church and its surroundings continued after Bolton left in 1880. Four years later, the church bought from Josephine Vermilye, who was still living at 30 Bedford, two of the lots of the Square in order to expand its cemetery. Around the same time, 44 Bedford Road, the last of the district's contributing properties, was built. In 1888, 16 Bedford was moved from its location closer to 24 Bedford and converted from a shoemaking shop into a residence. At the other end of the district, the church's interior was renovated, with the original gallery removed and the entire sanctuary redone in the more contemporary Gothic Revival style, the only concession to tastes that had changed since church and accompanying buildings were constructed. Vermilye later sold her house to a family whose members lived in it and grew an extensive vegetable garden throughout the first half of the 20th century.

=== 1889–1984: Effects of Armonk's growth ===
As the 20th century dawned, the automobile made its presence felt in Armonk. Three of the Bedford Road houses had garages built behind them in the 1910s. Westchester's growing suburbanization made itself felt in Armonk, which was not on the railroad lines that had fed that growth, in the early part of that decade when New York City's continuing growth necessitated the construction of Kensico Reservoir two miles (3.2 km) to the south. Kensico, the hamlet that had given the reservoir its name, was abandoned and flooded. Some of its former residents resettled in Armonk, further contributing to its growth.

During the next decade, New York began to build its state highway system to serve its growing population of motorists. Bedford Road was designated part of what has since become NY 22 in 1924, and then a decade later NY 128 was routed along Bedford Road as well. These developments brought traffic from the city and Greenwich, Connecticut, respectively, into Armonk from the south along Bedford Road.

Thus, in 1948, North Castle decided to build its new town hall complex on the south side, opposite the church and houses. This required the demolition of the new parsonage that Rev. Bolton had had built in the 1860s. The church repurchased 30 Bedford Road to serve as the parsonage; it has remained in their ownership. A decade later, the last member of the family Josephine Vermilye had sold her house to died; the heirs in turn sold it to a man who used it as an auction house for several years before closing that business down. It remained unused until its demolition late in the century.

A decade and a half later, Armonk and Bedford Road would face another transformation. In 1964 IBM moved its corporate headquarters from New York City to the hills south of the hamlet, between it and the Connecticut state line. By the end of the decade the state had begun construction of Interstate 684 to handle the increased traffic.

In conjunction with the construction of I-684's Armonk interchange just to the hamlet's west, the state highways were realigned off Bedford Road. NY 22, which had followed the Old Post Road into town past IBM, now overlapped with New York State Route 120 for a short distance at the north end of the reservoir to a new four-lane divided highway that bypassed Armonk to the south on its way to the interstate exit. Similarly, NY 128 was truncated so that it followed an extension of Main Street to end at a new intersection with NY 22. Both no longer followed Bedford Road, which in turn was vacated to a dead end at one of the interchange's offramps, greatly reducing passing traffic.

=== 1985–present: Redevelopment ===
In the years after the historic district was delineated and listed on the National Register, Armonk began to become a desirable suburb despite its distance from local commuter rail lines. Residential property values rose in the area, and developers began looking at opportunities to build commercial projects downtown, where demand was quickly outgrowing the buildings that had served the hamlet well through its time as a country town and early years of suburbanization. Of particular interest was the property just north of the district, part of the original lots the church and the Vermilyes had subdivided and sold.

However, development had been hindered by toxic waste contamination of groundwater in the area. For years several dry cleaners had dumped and spilled their waste chemicals in the area, until the county health department discovered the extent of the pollution in 1979. Downtown Armonk had been declared a Superfund site, and the federal Environmental Protection Agency was supplying affected homes and businesses with bottled water while monitoring it.

During the late 1980s, a developer proposed a project called Heritage Square, with condominiums and residences, to be built mostly on the land that had once been the Vermilyes'. It would solve the water problems via a pipeline from a similar condominium project in the town of New Castle to the north. But local opposition to that aspect and the extra parking it would require blocked it.

In the late 2000s, the Armonk Square project, a 51,000-square-foot (4,700 m^{2}) development mixing commercial space and one-room apartments with a supermarket, was proposed. In order to meet town parking requirements and provide access from the south, Elm Street was upgraded from a driveway serving 44 Bedford Road into a full paved public street. This met with heavy opposition from local preservationists as well as the state's Historic Preservation Office, who claimed it would needlessly divide the historic district. After a slight reduction in size, the project was completed and opened in 2014.

== Aesthetics ==
The identity of the church's architect is not known. The building's application of the vernacular Greek Revival style is unusual for its eclecticism. It uses aspects of the style more frequently associated with academic buildings, such as the Doric columns and entablature on the front facade; the window surrounds on the sides are also not commonly found on vernacular Greek Revival churches.

At that time the Greek Revival style for churches was at its highest; there would have been many other churches to influence the design. The Doric facade and recessed porch were prominent features of the 1835 St. James' Roman Catholic Church in Manhattan, based on patterns by Minard Lefever; the Town and Davis Carmine Street Church, also in Manhattan and of the same era, had the same feature and was also widely imitated. In turn, St. Stephen's seems to have influenced later churches in Westchester such as the Methodist Church of Mamaroneck and the Banksville Baptist Church. Its side entrances are unique among those churches, however.

The church'a cemetery follows the standard churchyard pattern of the time it was established. Graves are laid out in a regular north–south rows, filling most of the space allotted, with no overall landscaping evident. All graves are marked by single stones, generally either simple white marble markers from the time of settlement to more elaborate granite stones typical of the later Victorian period, with a few more modern plain markers. There are no crypts or large monuments, nor fenced groupings.

Between the early 1850s and 1867, all the remaining houses in the district were built save 44 Bedford Road. They show differing degrees to which the Federal style that had characterized American architecture at the beginning of the century was being supplanted by the similarly neoclassical Greek Revival mode. At the west end, 12 and 16 Bedford are, befitting smaller houses, very restrained in their application of the style, the former showing it mostly in form and its sidehall entrance plan, with minimal ornament. Next door, 16 Bedford Road, a former shoemaker's shop located at 24 Bedford until 1888, uses its front-gable orientation to suggest a pediment.

On the other end of the district and its stylistic extreme is 40 Bedford Road, the original rectory. With a more openly cubic form, and post and lintel construction openly recalling classical Greek architecture, it establishes itself firmly in the emerging Greek Revival. The two-and-a-half-story size is unusual in rural applications of the style; it is emphasized with the frieze windows. At the same time, its minimal decoration overall echoes the simplicity of the Georgian style that prevailed during the 18th century.

In between are 24 and 30 Bedford, both buildings where the Federal influence is stronger. Their vertical forms and lighter proportions are more in keeping with the earlier style. Similar applications from their time period can be found in rural communities in this part of New York and adjacent regions of New England.

The last house built, 44 Bedford, hews closely to the same style. Despite being the smallest in size, it retains the same general forms and materials as its older neighbors. This suggests a conscious effort to retain stylistic continuity with the buildings around it rather than embrace newer styles such as the Picturesque and other less restrained Victorian trends that had emerged in the decades since St. Stephen's and the other Bedford Road houses had been built. It also reflects the influence exerted on Armonk's builders by the more conservative architectural trends of nearby Connecticut rather than the rest of the Hudson Valley, where the Picturesque took hold early. However, the novelty siding, porch and porch detailing are more in accord with post Civil War houses.

== Preservation ==
In 1978 North Castle established a Landmarks Preservation Committee. It has nine members, appointed to staggered three-year terms by the Town Board, at least one of whom must be an architect, civil engineer, historian, or realtor. It is charged with considering nominations for landmark status and any alterations to them that might impact their historic character. As the first residential subdivision in Armonk and the town's sole historic district, the Bedford Road properties are one of its major concerns.

== See also ==
- National Register of Historic Places listings in northern Westchester County, New York
