= Smith Tavern =

Historic commercial building in New York, United States

- U.S. National Register of Historic Places
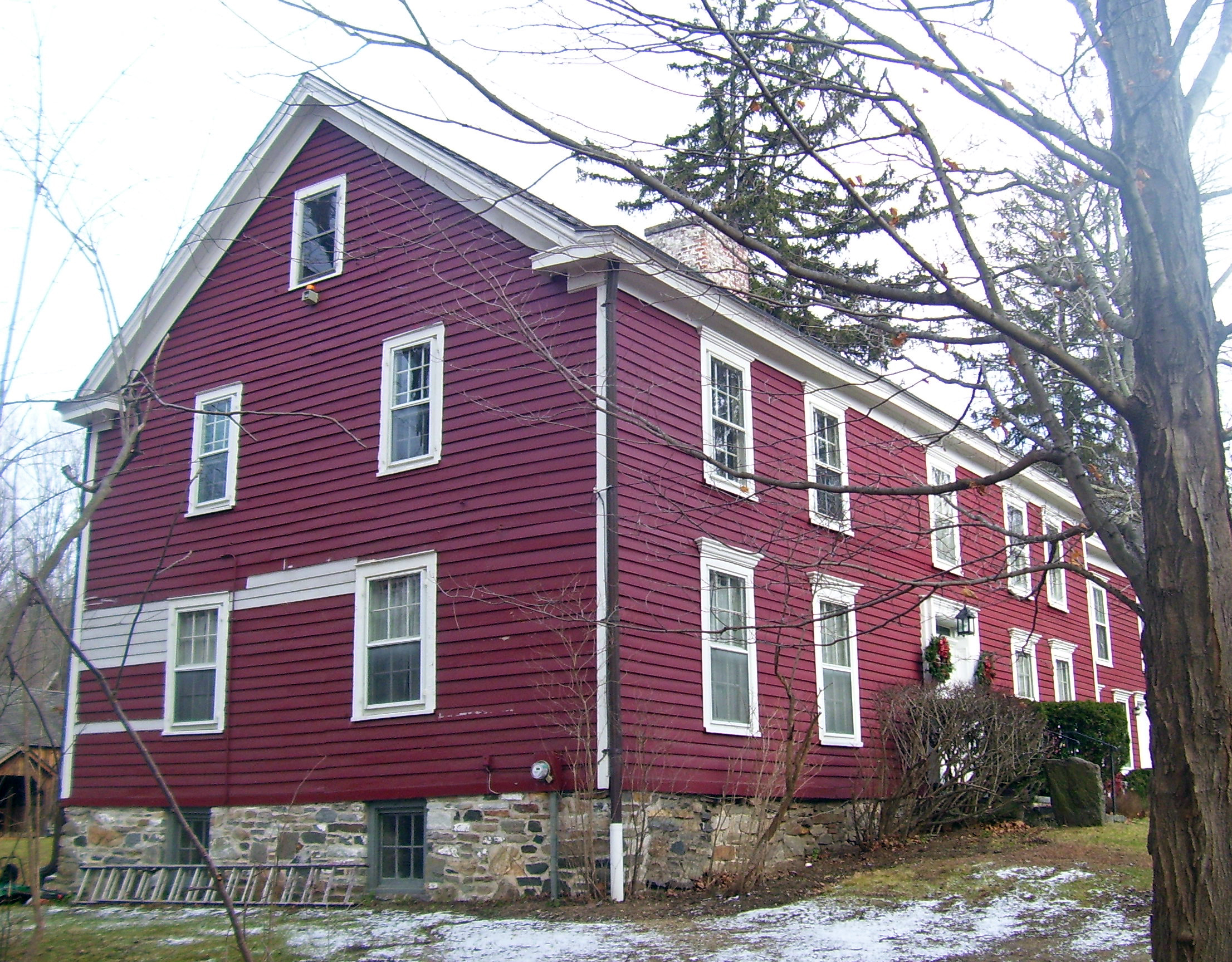
- West profile and south elevation, 2008
- Location: Armonk, NY
- Nearest city: White Plains
- Coordinates: 41°7′34″N 73°41′38″W
- Area: 2 acres (0.81 ha)
- Built: ca. 1779
- NRHP reference No.: 83001833
- Added to NRHP: September 15, 1983

The former Smith Tavern (or Smith's Tavern) is located on Bedford Road (NY 22) in the hamlet of Armonk, Westchester County, New York, United States. It is a red frame building dating to the late 18th century, one of the few left in a region that has rapidly suburbanized over the past century. The Smith family, for whom it is named, did not build it but owned it for most of the 19th century.

It has seen many uses over its existence, most of them important to the development of the Town of North Castle. During the Revolutionary War it served as headquarters for the local militia. It was a frequent overnight stop for stagecoaches between New York City and Danbury, Connecticut. Later it was the post office and offices of the town clerk. Yale University owned it briefly, and it was also a parsonage for a nearby church. Two owners renovated it extensively, one reverting an addition made by the other. In 1977 it became the town's historical museum, and six years later it was listed on the National Register of Historic Places.

== Building ==
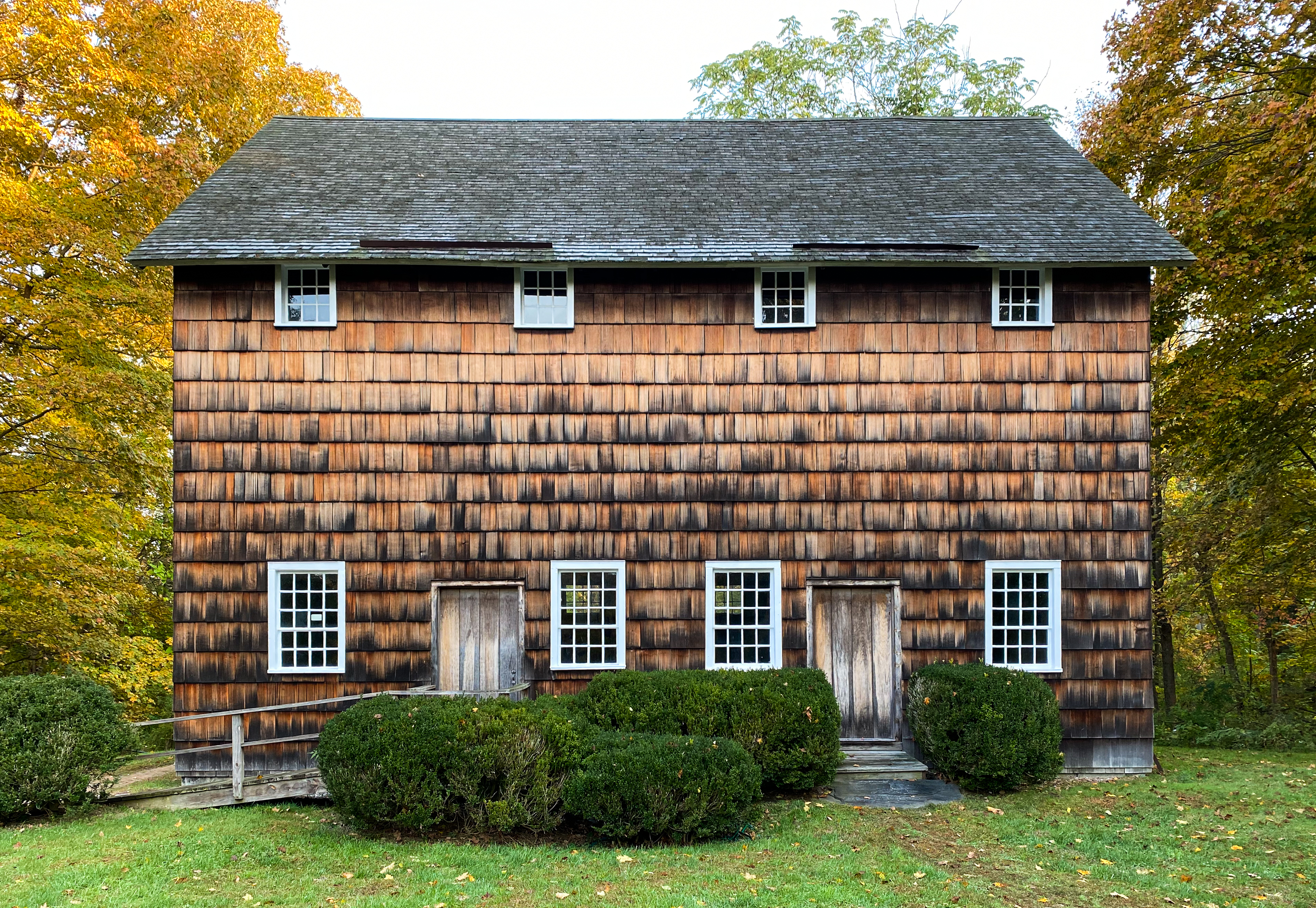
The 1798 Quaker Meeting House, part of the Smith Tavern Educational Complex

The 2-acre (0.81 ha) lot the tavern sits on is located on the north side of Route 22, a north-south highway which runs closer to east-west at this point, paralleling the Connecticut state line. It is in a residential area of large and mostly wooded properties a half-mile north along the highway from a commercial area between the junctions with Byram Lake Road and NY 433. A church is to the northeast.

A small fieldstone wall separates the building from the road. It is a clapboard-sided building on a stone foundation in three sections. The main one is five by two bays on the south (front) elevation and four in the rear, its two stories topped with a gabled roof shingled in asphalt and pierced by a single brick chimney. On the northeast, the wing that includes the original house is two by two bays and two stories high with a shallow pitched hipped roof. It has been extended to the northwest to create a garage.

Ornamentation on the building is minimal. At the roofline there is a simple cornice and returns. The windows have simple wooden sills and lintels. At the center of the first story, the main entrance is a double door with glass transom. The rear entrance is off-center.

On the inside the largest rooms on each story are in the southwest section. The meeting room on the first floor has a fireplace, paneling and wide floorboards, both in pine and all original. Other rooms on the floor have their original flooring and late 19th century wallpaper. In the master bedroom above it, museum collection items like tools and toys are displayed. The other bedrooms also have similar decor to their downstairs counterparts.

== History ==
It is unclear exactly when the current building was built, but there had been a tavern at the site since at least the Revolutionary War. The local militia was headquartered at a tavern on the site in 1779. The first known owner, a Quaker named Benjamin Hopkins, sheltered there "the poor and homeless" who fled from British-occupied New York City early in the war before himself departing for Fishkill in search of more neutral territory.

The British burned his house along White Plains Road in 1779, along with others in Bedford, and may have burned his tavern as well, then occupied by a tenant named Ichabod Ogden. The current building may have been built around what remained afterwards.

By 1792, the tavern was owned by a Benjamin Tripp. Records show that the Town Board of that time met at the town clerk's office (his house) and then went to the tavern afterwards. The town clerk, Harrison Palmer, bought the tavern himself in the early 1790s, making the board's post-meeting trip unnecessary.

In 1797, Palmer sold the tavern to John Smith, a former Continental Army captain who had spent most of the war as a prisoner. He was elected town clerk the following year. Soon all political activity in the town, debates and rallies as well as meetings of official bodies, took place at the tavern. Since it was located at the 37th milestone along the Danbury Post Road, it was a frequent place for the stagecoach to overnight on the road, and its passengers gave the rural town a connection to events in the city and New England.

John Smith ran the tavern, farmed the nearby land and served as town clerk until 1830, when he was succeeded by his son Samuel. In 1809, when the local post office was established there, he was its first postmaster. By the time he left the post in 1855, the rise of the railroad displaced the Danbury stagecoach, and the inn became less locally important, eventually ceasing all commercial function and becoming the family house. Samuel Smith continued to live there and farm the land until his death in 1884.

His heirs sold it to Odle Knapp, a successful farmer from nearby Greenwich, Connecticut, who gave it to his son and daughter-in-law as a wedding gift. Augustus and Kate Knapp expanded and renovated the house greatly in 1898. They replaced all the front windows, extended the northeast wing and added a second story to it. A front gable and Victorian porch they added were later removed to restore the tavern's historical appearance.

In 1905 they sold the house and accompanying farmlands to a George Smith of Armonk, unrelated to the original owners. He farmed the land until selling it 11 years later, in 1916. The buyer, Fay Stanton of New York, was taken with the building's history and tried to revive it as a tavern, the Red Jacket Inn. It failed, and two years it and the remaining 17 acres (6.9 ha) of the farm were sold at auction to wealthy New York City businessman John Sterling, joining a number of rental properties he owned in the area.

Sterling died later that year, and willed the property to his alma mater, Yale University. Almost two decades passed before the trustees of his estate transferred the property. Yale sold it and what was now five acres (2 ha) to Franklin and Frances Brown two years later. They began renovating it extensively, and sold it six years later to another couple, the Datlowes, who continued the renovations.

The combined work by the two couples was the most extensive done on the house. The Knapps' porch and gable were removed, and the chimney rebuilt. Inside, much of the wallpaper was removed to reveal the original paneling, and the kitchen and bathrooms modernized. The finished house was painted in its current colors.

The Datlowes sold it in 1974 to the nearby Christian and Missionary Alliance Church, which used as a parsonage and meeting place. Three years later, the church decided to build a more modern facility for this latter purpose, and sold the house and the last two acres of its original holdings to the North Castle Historical Society. It was converted into a museum and has remained in that role ever since. The society's docents graciously offer guided tours two days a week.

== Smith Tavern Educational Complex ==
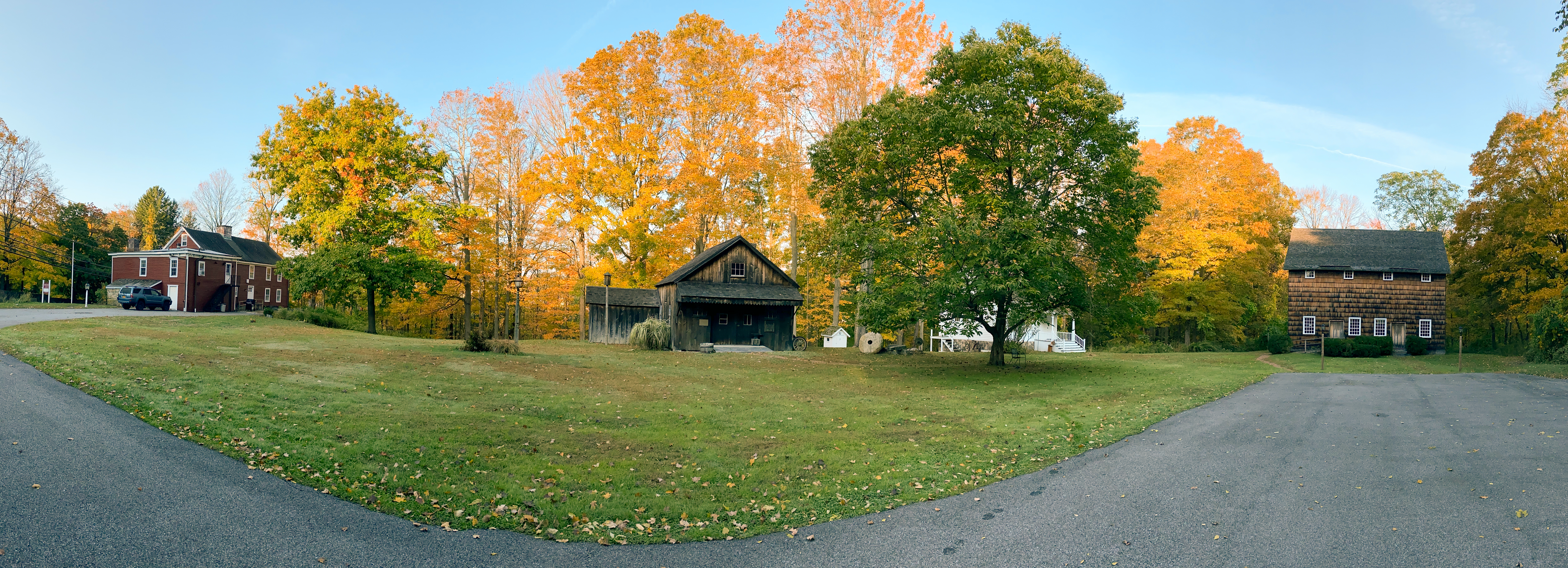
This 180° view of the Smith Tavern Educational Complex shows, from left to right, the Smith Tavern, the Brundage Blacksmith Shop, Dr. Jerry Light's Privy (partially obscured), the one-room East Middle Patent Schoolhouse, and the 1798 Quaker Meeting House.

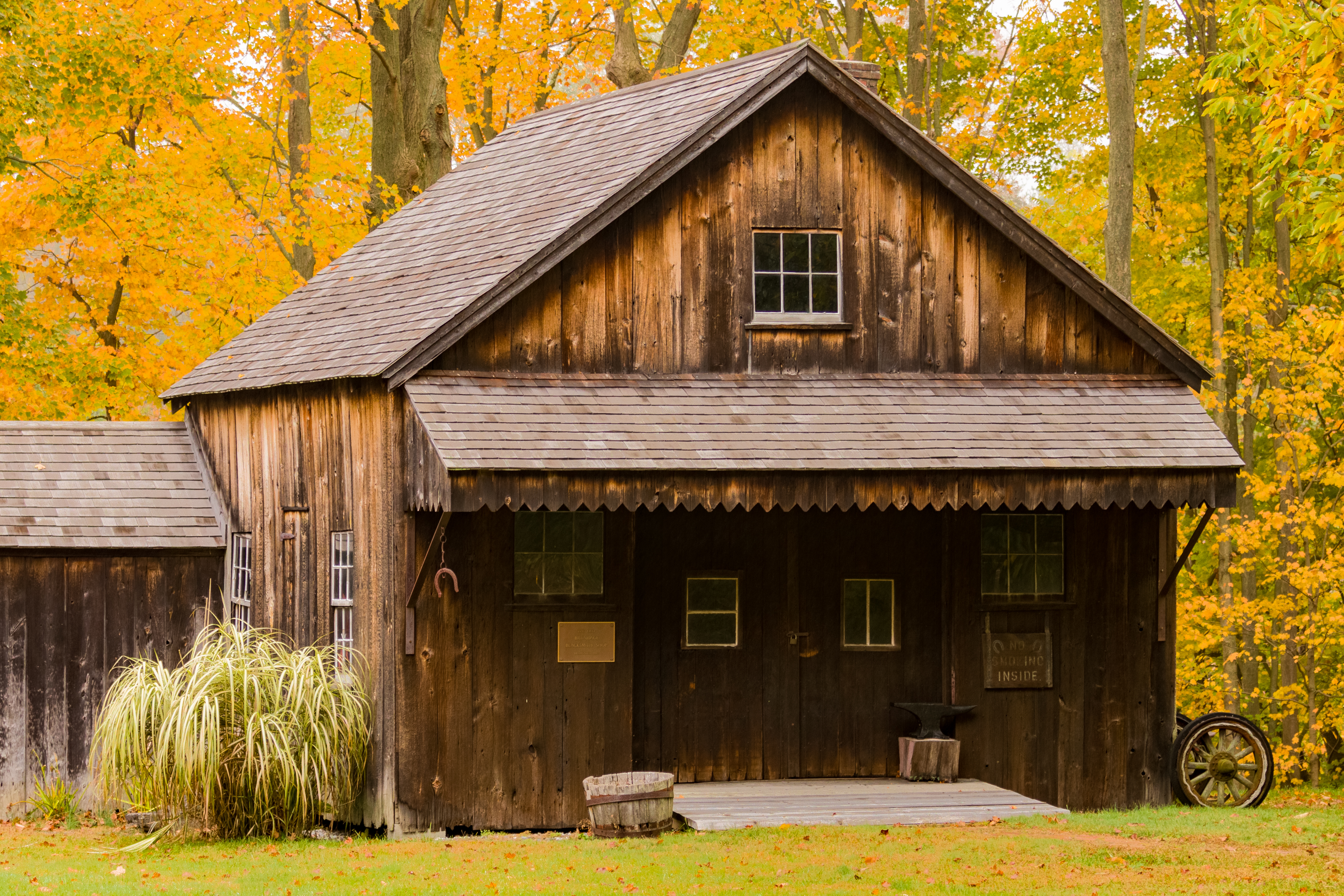
The Brundage Blacksmith Shop, which was built in the 1800s and acquired in 1981.

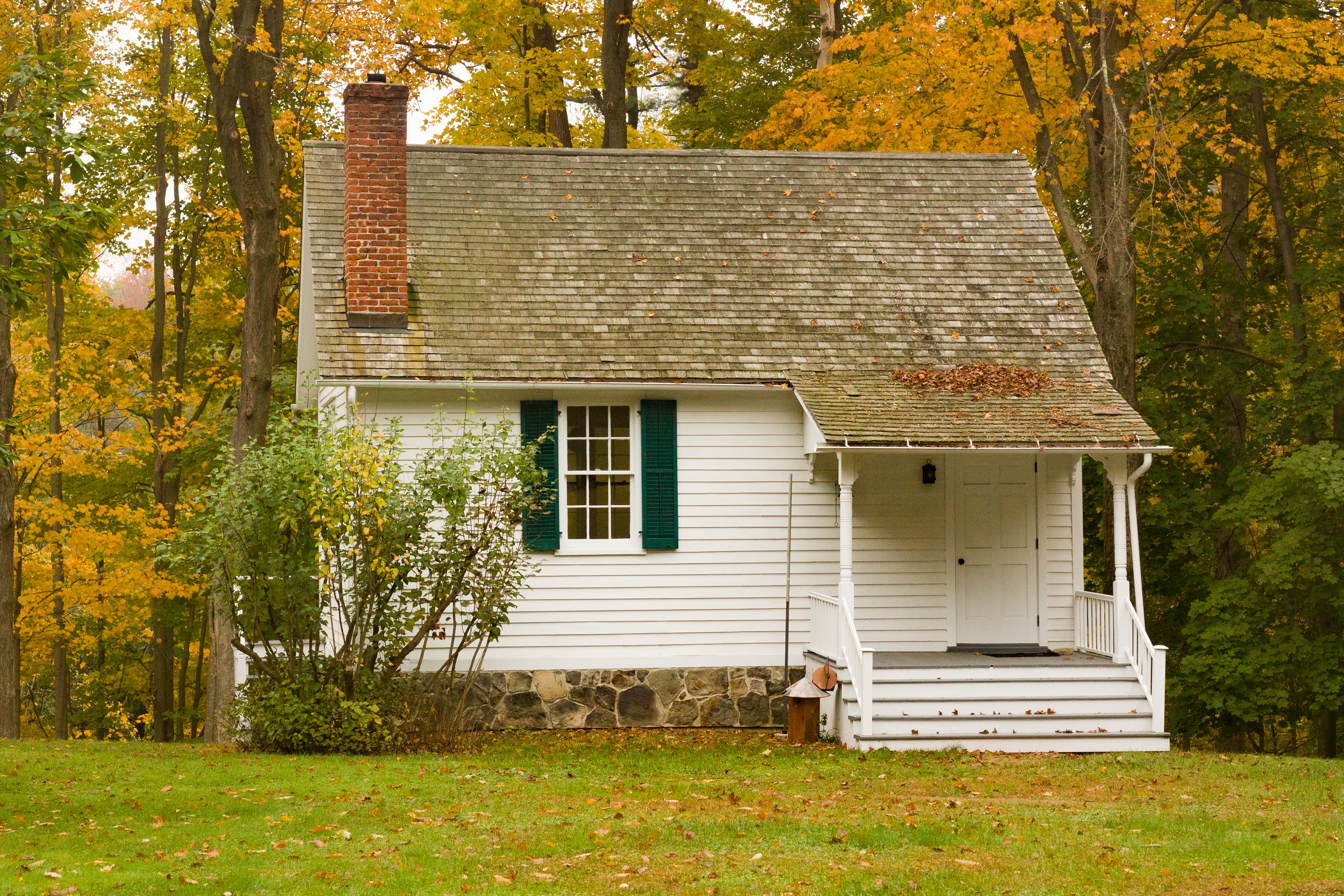
The one-room East Middle Patent Schoolhouse, which served first through eighth graders for 40 years during the 19th and 20th centuries.

The Smith Tavern is part of the Smith Tavern Educational Complex, which contains four additional buildings: the Brundage Blacksmith Shop, Dr. Jerry Light’s Privy, the one-room East Middle Patent Schoolhouse, and the 1798 Quaker Meeting House. The Brundage Blacksmith Shop was acquired in 1981, as was Dr. Jerry Light’s Privy. The Schoolhouse was acquiring in 1984 and the Quaker Meeting House was acquired in 1995.

== See also ==
- National Register of Historic Places listings in northern Westchester County, New York
