= New York State Route 128 =

State highway in Westchester County, New York, US

New York State Route 128
- Map of Westchester County in southeastern New York with NY 128 highlighted in red

Route information
- Maintained by NYSDOT
- Length: 5.53 mi (8.90 km)
- Existed: 1930–present

Major junctions
- South end: NY 22 in Armonk
- North end: NY 117 in Mount Kisco

Location
- Country: United States
- State: New York
- Counties: Westchester

Highway system
- New York Highways; Interstate; US; State; Reference; Parkways
← NY 127	→ NY 129

New York State Route 128 (NY 128) is a 5.53-mile (8.90 km) long north–south state highway in northern Westchester County, New York. The route begins at an intersection with NY 22 just west of I-684 in the hamlet of Armonk. Crossing through downtown Armonk, the route connects to NY 117 in the southern end of the village of Mount Kisco.

NY 128 was first constructed during the early 1900s with a pair of contracts handed out by the state of New York, which constructed the new alignment between NY 22 and the triangle junction with NY 117 in Mount Kisco. These segments were both added into the state highway system in 1903. NY 128 itself was designated in the 1930 renumbering of state highways from Armonk to Mount Kisco. This was extended in the mid-1930s to connect to the Connecticut state line at Riversville Road. However, in 1971, the state truncated NY 128 back to NY 22 in Armonk and renumbered the short connector as NY 433.

== Route description ==
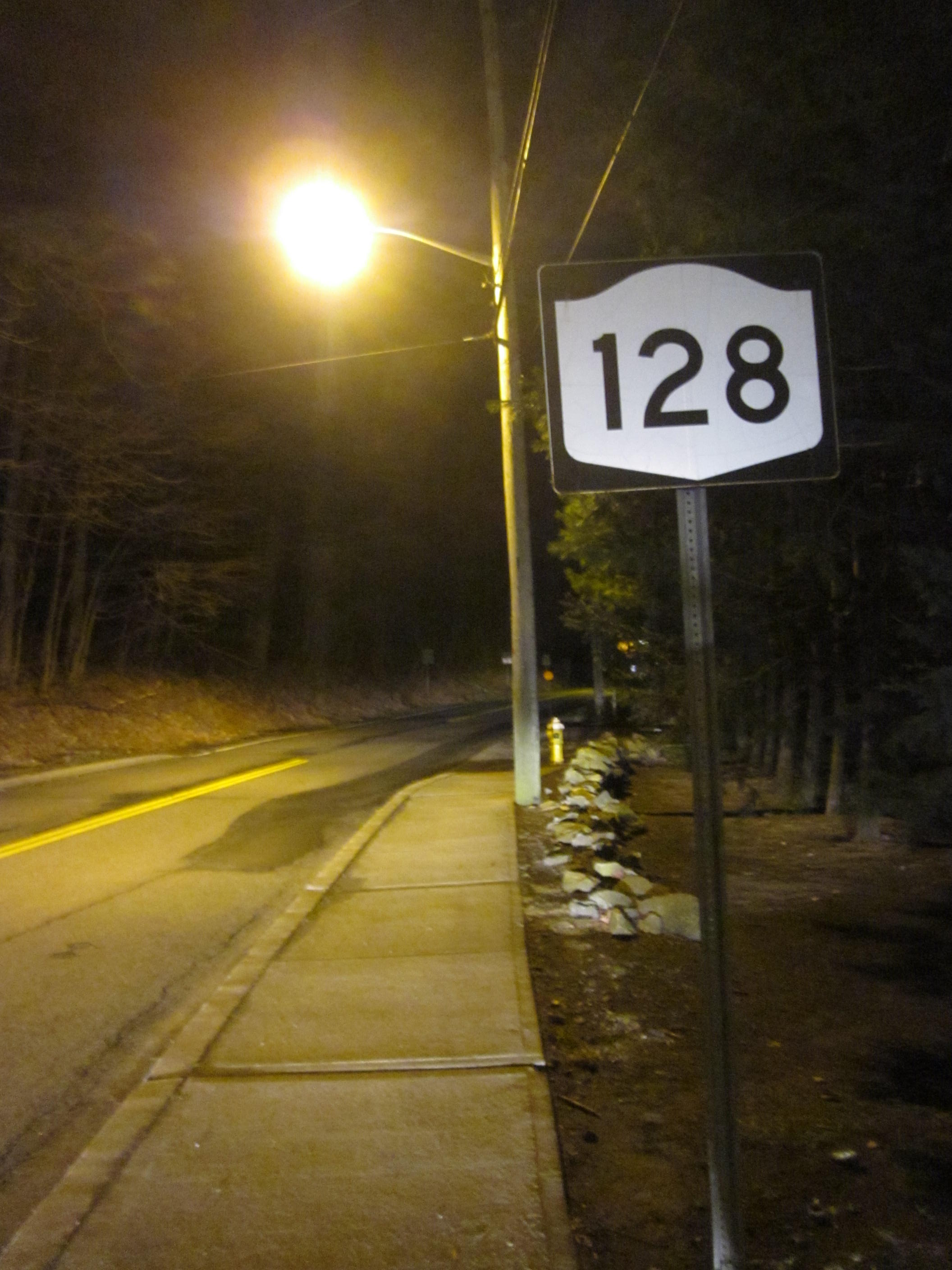
NY 128 northbound at night through the hamlet of Armonk

NY 128 begins at an intersection with NY 22 (Armonk–Bedford Road), an expressway, in the hamlet of Armonk (within the town of North Castle). NY 128 proceeds north on Main Street, a two-lane commercial street, intersecting with an old alignment of NY 22, entering the town center for North Castle, where it maintains the commercial backdrop through town. Passing west of Wampus Brook Park, NY 128 intersects with Old Mount Kisco Road, an old alignment as it leaves the town center. NY 128 soon parallels the park and Wampus Brook on its way north, maintaining the Main Street moniker until an intersection with Old Mount Kisco Road. At that junction, the route becomes Armonk–Mount Kisco Road, making a large bend westward near Al Ehrmann Park.

Now running northwest, NY 128 crosses through North Castle as a two-lane residential roadway, paralleling Wrights Mill Road into Wampus Pond County Park. Through the parkland, NY 128 bends northwest, running along the northern edge of the park, and passing Wampus Pond. NY 128 soon enters the town of New Castle, where it changes names to Armonk Road on its way north, remaining a two-lane residential street. The route winds its way north via several bends, soon becoming a wooded roadway through New Castle. Residences remain spacious, paralleling NY 128 into the village of Mount Kisco. Now in Mount Kisco, NY 128 splits off Armonk Road and becomes Lexington Avenue before intersecting NY 117 (Main Street), where the NY 128 designation ends.

== History ==
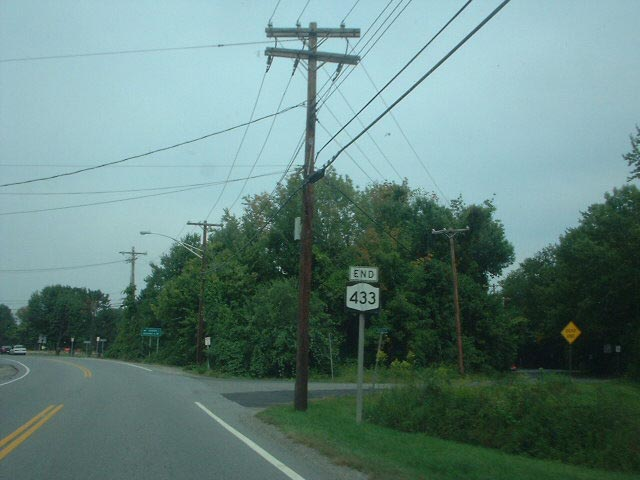
NY 433, the former alignment of NY 128 south of NY 22

The roadways that make up a majority of NY 128 through Westchester were upgraded to state highway standards in the early 1900s by local contractors. Designated unsigned State Highway 35 (SH 35), the southern part of NY 128 from NY 22 and School Street in Armonk, along with a segment of NY 22 to NY 120. The segment was given a contract on July 22, 1901 at the cost of $26,000 (1901 USD), half of which was paid by the state. The segment was completed and accepted into the state highway system on October 1, 1903, over two years after construction began on the 3.21-mile (5.17 km) alignment.

The other segment of NY 128, and the majority of the current road, was designated as SH 50, running from School Street in Armonk to the current triangle junction with NY 117 in Mount Kisco was also contracted on July 22, 1901. This segment, 4.44 miles (7.15 km) long, came at the cost of $38,103.08 (1901 USD), which was paid by the state at the total of $10,051.54. While longer than the other segment, this section of NY 128 was completed and accepted into the state highway system on February 9, 1903, eight months prior to SH 35.

NY 128 was assigned as part of the 1930 renumbering of state highways in New York. In the mid-1930s, NY 128 was extended southward to the Connecticut state line by way of an overlap with NY 22 and Greenwich Road. It was truncated back to its current southern terminus in the January 1971. The former routing of NY 128 south of NY 22 was redesignated as NY 433.

== Major intersections ==
The entire route is in Westchester County.

Location	mi	km	Destinations	Notes
Town of Bedford	0.00	0.00	NY 22 – Bedford, White Plains	Southern terminus; hamlet of Armonk
Mount Kisco	5.40	8.69	To NY 117 north	Access via Armonk Road
Mount Kisco	5.53	8.90	NY 117	Northern terminus
1.000 mi = 1.609 km; 1.000 km = 0.621 mi
