= New York State Route 433 (disambiguation) =

New York State Route 433 is a north–south state highway in Westchester County, New York, United States, that was established in the 1970s.

New York State Route 433 may also refer to:

- New York State Route 433 (1937–1940) in Schoharie County
- New York State Route 433 (1950s–1960s) in Onondaga County
