= Banksville =

Banksville may refer to:

- Banksville, New York, a hamlet in the town of North Castle, New York, and an area including Stamford and Greenwich, Connecticut
- Banksville (Pittsburgh), a neighborhood in Pittsburgh, Pennsylvania
