= Byram Hills High School =

Public school in Armonk, New York, US

Coordinates: 41°08′04″N 73°41′23″W

Location
- 12 Tripp Lane; Armonk, New York 10504; United States

Information
- Type: Public, co-educational, 9–12
- Established: 1965
- School district: Byram Hills Central School District
- CEEB code: 330225
- Principal: Christopher Walsh
- Faculty: 79.81 (FTE)
- Enrollment: 710 (2022–2023)
- Student to teacher ratio: 8.90
- Colors: navy blue #002855 and red #9c1918.
- Mascot: Bobcat
- Newspaper: The Oracle
- Yearbook: The Arch
- Website: www.byramhills.org/bhhs

Byram Hills High School is a four-year co-educational public secondary school located in Armonk, New York, United States. It is the only secondary school in the Byram Hills Central School District, and serves students from the towns of North Castle, Bedford, Mount Pleasant, and New Castle. The school has over 700 students in grades 9–12.

== Athletics ==
The mascot of Byram Hills is the Bobcat and its colors are navy and red.

== Honors ==
In the 2022 "Best High Schools" edition by U.S. News & World Report, Byram Hills was ranked number 20 in the state and 186 nationally.

== Notable alumni ==
- Laura Branigan – singer
- Eddie Cahill – actor
- Peter Gallagher – actor
- David Harbour – actor
- Bryce Dallas Howard – actress
- Chance Kelly – actor
- Tom Kitt – musician and composer
