= Kensico, New York =

Former hamlet in New York

Coordinates: 41.08°N 73.77°W

Kensico is a former hamlet in central Westchester County, New York. It was relocated and flooded to build the Kensico Reservoir, one of the central storage reservoirs for the New York City Reservoir system.

Neighboring towns and hamlets included North Castle, Mount Pleasant, Chappaqua, Valhalla, Armonk, and White Plains.

== History ==
Kensico was named after the Siwanoy Indian chief, Coken-se-co, a signatory of the deed for the city of White Plains. Prior to the town being flooded and removed from existence, Kensico was a stop on the Harlem Line out of Grand Central Terminal in New York City, shortly north of the White Plains stop. It was also one of three settlements in the area, Kenisco, Wright's Mills, and Davis Brook.

In 1845, residents of Kensico, about 2.5 miles away from Davis Brook, successfully appealed to change the name of the railroad station at Davis Brook to Kensico.

The hamlet, located in a valley between two larger mountains, featured a large red mill in its center, portions of the Bronx and Byram Rivers, and a Methodist Episcopal church.

Despite being a sleepy farming village in Westchester, the town had some reputation for quirky controversy. In 1882, storeowner Albert Montfort was found murdered in his store. The apparent weapon an axe, and his murderer was never found. On June 16, 1884, four intoxicated workers from the new dam entered the Joseph Reed Hotel and assaulted the bartender - two were arrested and two escaped after returning to Grand Central Terminal in New York City. On November 6, 1884, farmer John Donnelly died from mysterious injuries he obtained after a day of drunken carousing, his injuries presumably inflicted by a group of highwaymen who attacked him for unclear reasons.

Initial construction of the Kensico Dam began in 1881, however, plans were expanded which ultimately required the annexation of all of the land in the town. Property from the entire town was purchased for approximately $92,000, with the largest award of $24,000 being paid to the estate of Joseph Warren Tompkins for the destruction of his mill. Frank Tilford was paid $19,135 for the destruction of his stock and dairy farm on Big Rye Pond. The Westchester Ice Company was compensated $9,592 for the destruction of their facilities in Kensico. Compensation for the property was overseen by lawyer Henry T. Dykman.

Some protests were seen as the town was cleared for the reservoir. On April 1, 1893, hotel owner William Ackerly (owner of the Brookside Hotel) protested the mandatory evacuation by refusing to leave his property. Henry Dykman, Sheriff John Duffy, and Deputy Sheriff John Verplank then proceeded to remove Ackerly's belongings, leaving them outside. Ultimately, Ackerly and other townspeople evacuated their homes. On March 29, 1893, Commissioner of Public Works Daly began burning houses, barns, outhouses, and other potential sources of contamination in his 'war against microbes'.

The final water tunnel leading to Kensico broke ground on December 29, 1893. On August 22, 1895, about 500 Italian laborers working on the tunnel went on strike against their employer, John McQuade. The final Kensico Dam was built between 1913 and 1917, at an estimated cost of about $15,000,000, ultimately forming the Kensico Reservoir.
