= The Whippoorwill Club =

Private country club near Armonk, New York

Coordinates: 41°08′50″N 73°44′16″W

Whippoorwill Country Club
- Interactive map of Whippoorwill Country Club

Club information
- Location: New Castle / North Castle, near Armonk, New York, USA
- Established: 1928
- Type: Private
- Tota holes: 18
- Website: Whippoorwill Country Club

Course
- Designed by: Donald Ross, Charles H. Banks
- Par: 71
- Length: 6,697 yards (6,124 m)
- Course rating: 72.7

The Whippoorwill Club is a private country club facility near Armonk, New York. In 2010 Golfweek magazine ranked the Whippoorwill golf course as the 73rd best classic course in the United States. The club is not just about golf. There is a swimming pool, tennis courts, paddle ball courts and golf simulators, as well as the traditional club house with first class dining facilities. The Club offers golf, tennis and house memberships.

== History ==
Whippoorwill was founded in 1928 on the 2nd highest point in Westchester County, Whippoorwill Hill. The club is divided between the hamlets of Chappaqua and Armonk, New York, with the club house and half of the course lying in Armonk and another half lying in Chappaqua. The course was designed by world-famous golf course architect Donald Ross and renovated by Charles H. Banks.

== Course layout ==
The course was originally designed by Ross to lie all on one side of Whippoorwill Road, colloquially known as "Squirrel Alley." After Banks did renovations in 1928, holes 4-9, and 12-14 were moved to the other side of the road. The course is unique in that no holes from four through nine are parallel. Legend has it, among members, that during the construction of the 7th hole a steam shovel sank in the muddy bottom of the pond below the tee box. To this day the steam shovel has never been discovered and the story continues to grow. On the left side of the 18th fairway, as players are approaching the green and the current clubhouse, the foundation of a monastery. Whippoorwill has undergone multiple clubhouse renovations, most recently in 2017.
