= Witthoefft House =

Historic house in New York, United States

- U.S. National Register of Historic Places
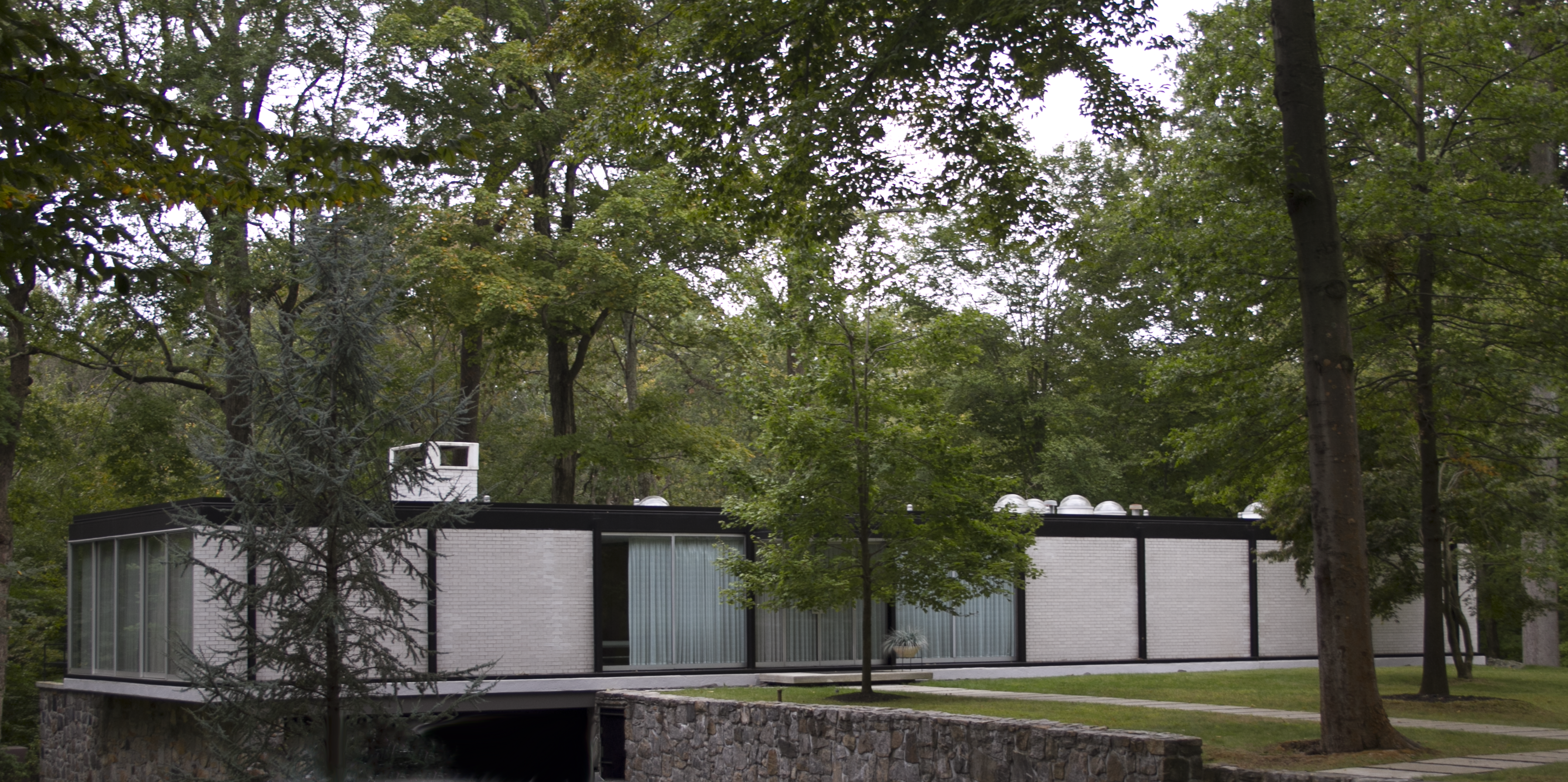

- Location within New York Location within the United States
- Location: 11 Tallwood Rd., Armonk, New York
- Coordinates: 41°07′48″N 73°44′13″W
- Area: 2.75 acres (1.11 ha)
- Built: 1957
- Architect: Witthoefft, Arthur
- Architectural style: Modern
- NRHP reference No.: 11000039
- Added to NRHP: February 22, 2011

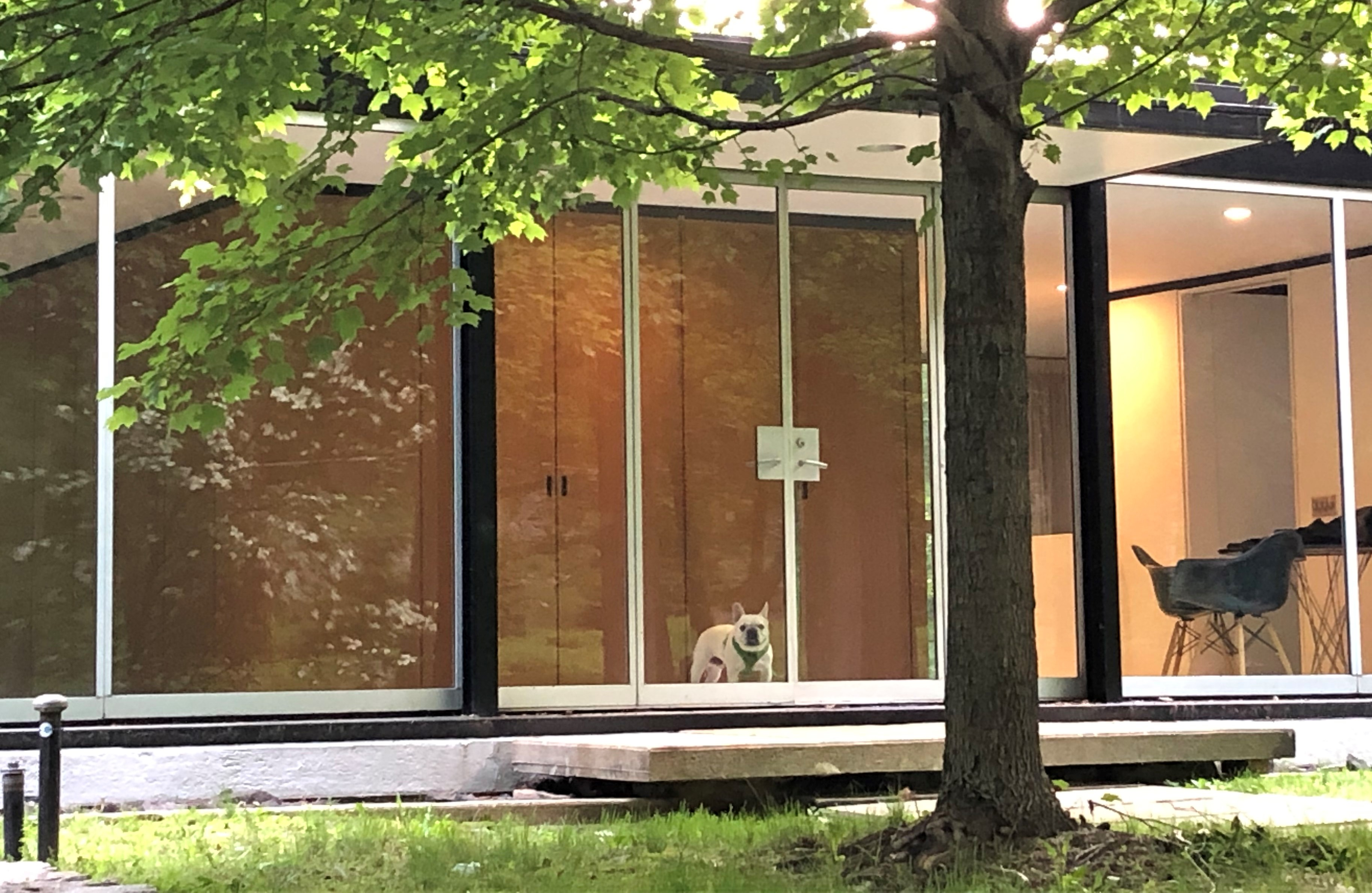

Witthoefft House is a historic home located at Armonk, Westchester County, New York. It was built in 1957, and is an International Style dwelling on a concrete slab foundation and stone covered concrete retaining walls. It features exposed structural steel, white glazed-brick walls, and full elevations of glass. The house is perched atop rock outcroppings in a semi-rural setting.

It was added to the National Register of Historic Places in 2011.

== See also ==
- National Register of Historic Places listings in northern Westchester County, New York
