= New York State Route 433 =

State highway in Westchester County, New York, US

New York State Route 433
- North Greenwich Road
- Map of Westchester County in southeastern New York with NY 433 highlighted in red

Route information
- Maintained by NYSDOT
- Length: 0.70 mi (1,130 m)
- Existed: January 1971–present

Major junctions
- South end: Riversville Road at the Connecticut state line
- North end: NY 22 in Armonk

Location
- Country: United States
- State: New York
- Counties: Westchester

Highway system
- New York Highways; Interstate; US; State; Reference; Parkways
← NY 432	→ NY 434

New York State Route 433 (NY 433) is a state highway located entirely in the town of North Castle in Westchester County, New York, United States. It runs for 0.70 miles (1.13 km) from the Connecticut state line, where it continues south into Greenwich as Riversville Road, to an intersection with NY 22 near the hamlet of Armonk. NY 433 is one of six New York touring routes less than one mile (1.6 km) in length. The route was originally designated as part of NY 128 in the 1930s. NY 128 was truncated to its junction with NY 22 in Armonk in January 1971, at which time its former routing along North Greenwich Road was redesignated as NY 433.

== Route description ==
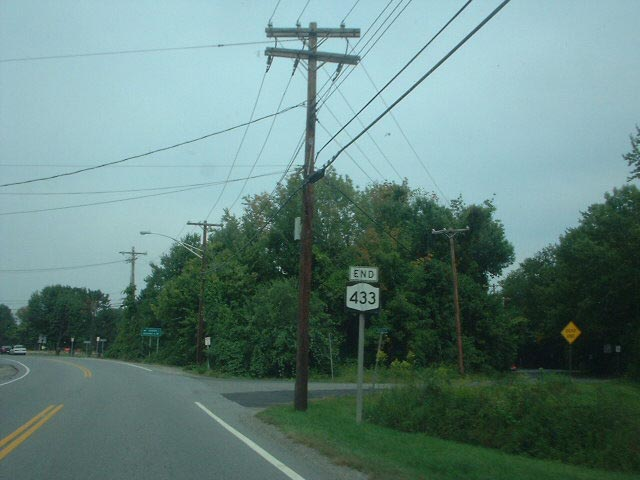
NY 433 approaching the junction with NY 22

NY 433 begins at the Connecticut state line in the town of North Castle. A northern, state-maintained continuation of Greenwich's Riversville Road, NY 433 proceeds north through North Castle as North Greenwich Road. NY 433 winds northward through a residential area of North Castle, passing the wooded Johnson Park on the southbound side of the highway. The route winds northward past several intersections with local streets, soon reaching the junction with NY 22 (Armonk–Bedford Road). This junction marks the northern terminus of NY 433, just 0.7-mile (1.1 km) north of the state line. The right-of-way continues north of NY 22 as Niles Avenue, while just east of this intersection are junctions with NY 128 and I-684 in Armonk.

== History ==
When NY 128 was assigned as part of the 1930 renumbering of state highways in New York, it initially ended at NY 22 in Armonk. It was extended southward to the Connecticut state line in the mid-1930s over NY 22 and North Greenwich Road. The extension of NY 128 remained intact until January 1971 when NY 128 was cut back to its original terminus in Armonk. NY 128's former routing along North Greenwich Road was then re-designated as NY 433.

== Major intersections ==
The entire route is in Westchester County.

Location	mi	km	Destinations	Notes
North Castle	0.00	0.00	Riversville Road – Glenville	Continuation into Connecticut
Armonk	0.70	1.13	NY 22 – Armonk, Bedford	
1.000 mi = 1.609 km; 1.000 km = 0.621 mi
