= Byram Hills Central School District =

School district in the United States

Byram Hills Central School District is a school district headquartered in Armonk, New York.

The schools include Coman Hill Elementary School, Wampus Elementary School, H.C. Crittenden Middle School, and Byram Hills High School.

William Donohue became superintendent in 2012; he had been an employee since 1990. He retired in 2017. In fall 2017 Jen Lamia, an employee since 1990, became the superintendent.
