= Gregory Ryan =

Australian cricketer

Personal information
- Born: 13 March 1913; Wallsend, New South Wales, Australia
- Died: 10 May 1986 (aged 73); Sydney, Australia
- Source: ESPNcricinfo, 25 January 2017

Gregory Ryan (13 March 1913 – 10 May 1986) was an Australian cricketer. He played one first-class match for New South Wales in 1934/35.

== See also ==
- List of New South Wales representative cricketers
