= Armonk, New York =

- CDP
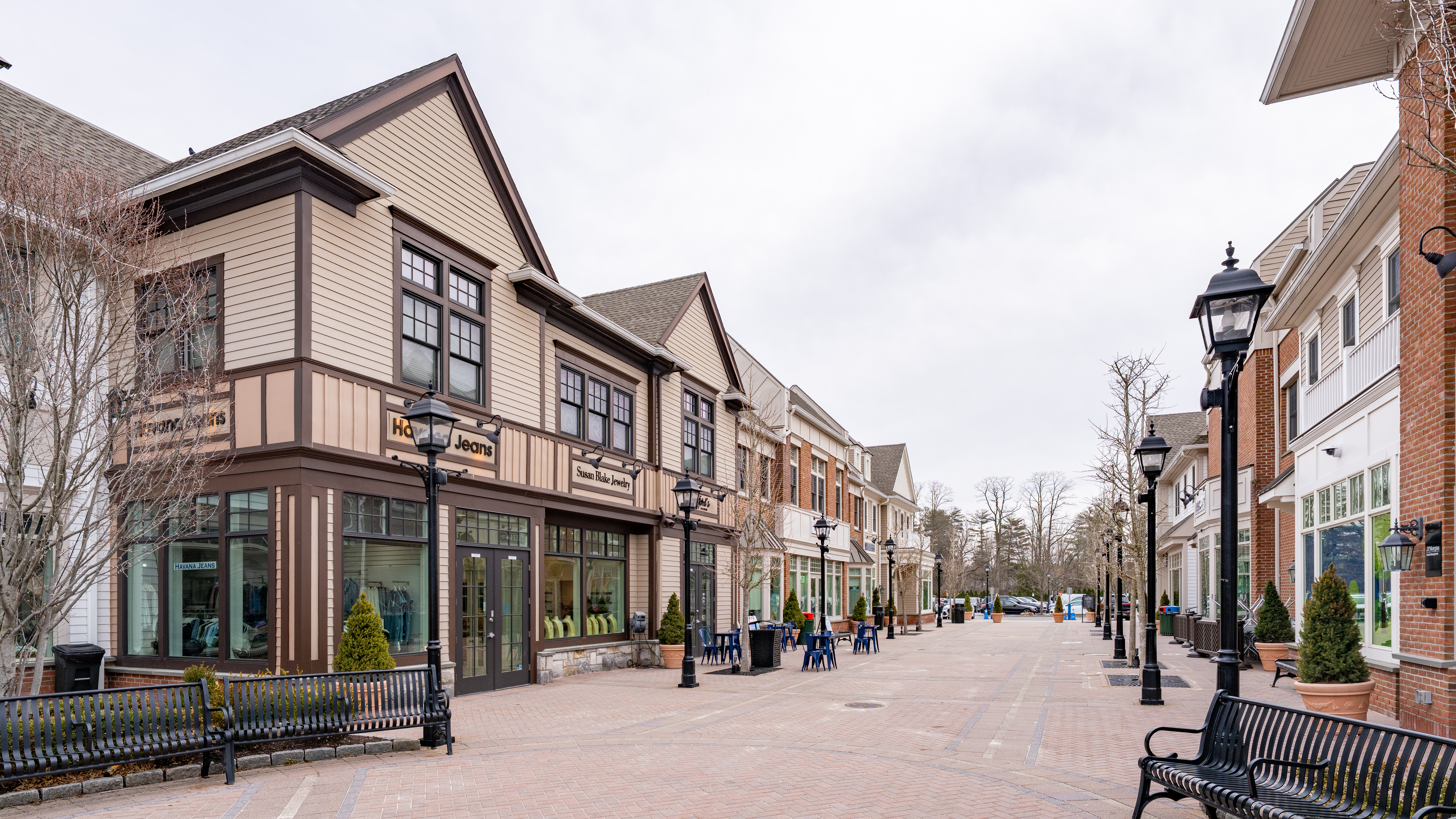
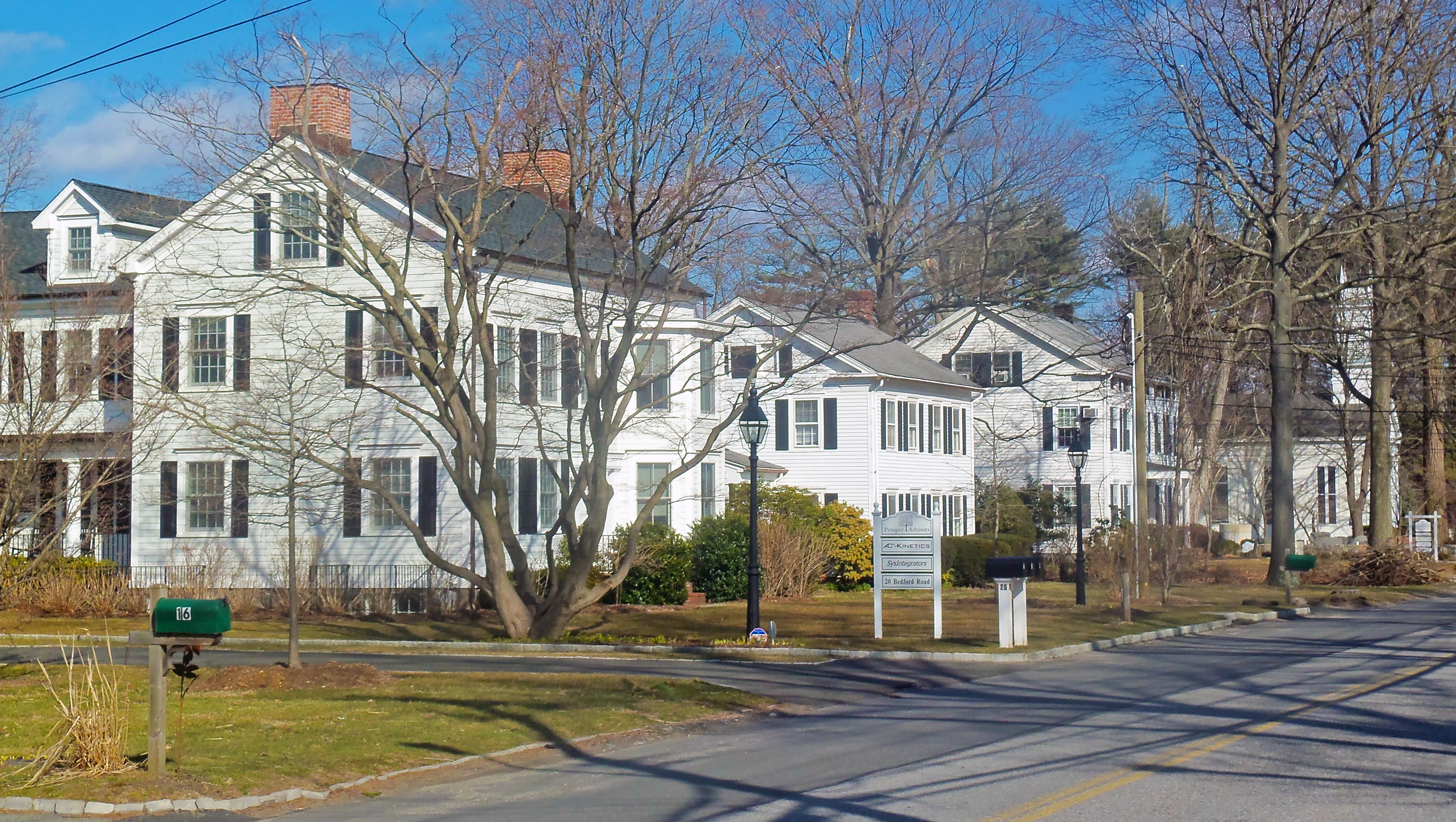
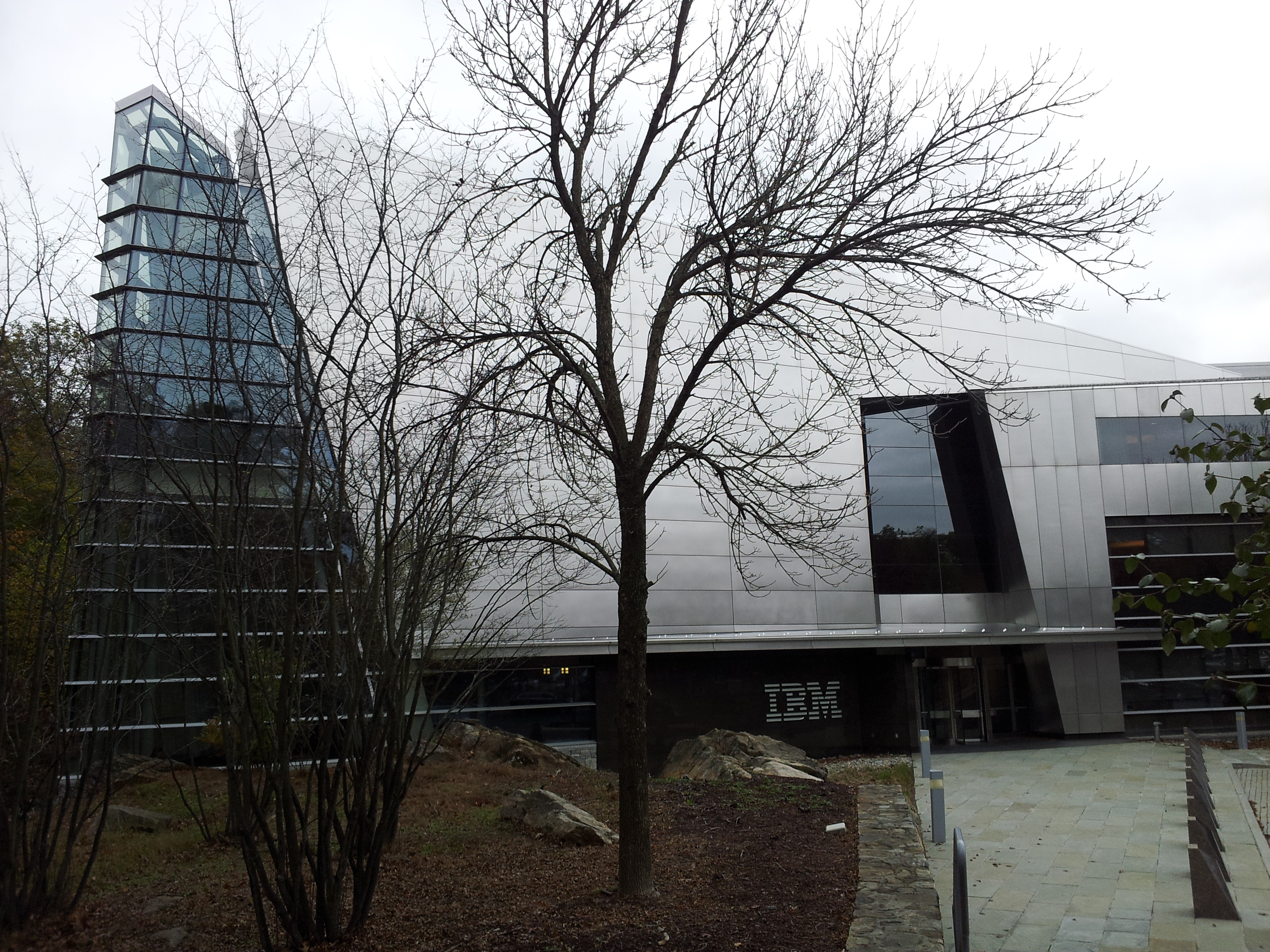
- Top (L–R): Armonk Square; Middle (L–R): the Bedford Road Historic District buildings, where it connects the district Bottom (L–R): IBM's corporate headquarters

- Location of Armonk, New York
- Coordinates: 41°7′43″N 73°42′28″W
- Country: United States
- State: New York
- County: Westchester
- Town: North Castle

Government
  - Supervisor: Joseph A. Rende

Area
  - Total: 6.03 sq mi (15.61 km^{2})
  - Land: 5.93 sq mi (15.37 km^{2})
  - Water: 0.093 sq mi (0.24 km^{2})
- Elevation: 387 ft (118 m)

Population (2020)
  - Total: 4,495
  - Density: 757.5/sq mi (292.49/km^{2})
- Time zone: UTC−5 (Eastern (EST))
  - Summer (DST): UTC−4 (EDT)
- ZIP Code: 10504
- Area code: 914
- FIPS code: 36-02649
- GNIS feature ID: 0942567
- Website: www.northcastleny.com

Armonk is a hamlet and census-designated place (CDP) in the town of North Castle, located in Westchester County, New York, United States. As of the 2020 census, Armonk had a population of 4,495. The corporate headquarters of IBM are located in Armonk.

== Geography and climate ==
As of the 2020 census, Armonk's CDP population was 4,450 and it has a total area of 6.1 square miles (15.7 km^{2}), of which 6.0 square miles (15.5 km^{2}) is land and 0.077 square miles (0.2 km^{2}), or 1.54 percent, is water.

Armonk, New York

Climate chart (precipitation, max. and min. temperature)
J	F	M	A	M	J	J	A	S	O	N	D
4.5 37 27	4.2 40 30	5.7 50 37	4.7 61 47	3.2 73 57	1.9 79 67	2.1 83 70	4.1 82 69	4.6 75 60	4.3 62 50	5.1 53 39	5.3 42 31
- █ Average max. and min. temperatures in °F
- █ Precipitation totals in inches
- Source: MyForecast
Metric conversion
J	F	M	A	M	J	J	A	S	O	N	D
114 3 −3	107 5 −1	145 10 3	119 16 8	81 23 14	48 26 19	53 28 21	104 28 20	117 24 15	109 16 10	130 12 4	135 6 0
- █ Average max. and min. temperatures in °C
- █ Precipitation totals in mm

Situated 11 miles from the coast in the southeastern corner of New York, Armonk shares a border with Connecticut. The landscape is hilly and forested with a mean elevation of 387 feet.

Armonk has a humid subtropical climate (Type Cfa) with cold, wet winters with occasional snow and hot, humid summers. Precipitation is plentiful, with the winter months receiving more precipitation than the summer months. Snowfall varies a lot from year to year, some years seeing just a few inches while others may see upwards of 35 inches (0.97 yd), but the average snowfall is 28 inches (0.78 yd). Winter precipitation comes mainly in the form of coastal storms that bring rain, snow and wind to New England and the Mid-Atlantic. Summer brings mostly stable, hot weather with 18 days per summer reaching 90 °F (32 °C). Summer is relatively dry, with scattered thunderstorms and the risk of a rare tropical storm in August and September. Spring and fall are transition seasons with moderate temperatures and moderate precipitation.

== Demographics ==
Historical population
Census	Pop.	Note	%±
2000	3,461		—
2020	4,495		—
U.S. Decennial Census

=== 2020 census ===
As of the 2020 census, Armonk had a population of 4,495. The median age was 44.1 years. 25.6% of residents were under the age of 18 and 19.4% of residents were 65 years of age or older. For every 100 females there were 90.9 males, and for every 100 females age 18 and over there were 87.3 males age 18 and over.

96.8% of residents lived in urban areas, while 3.2% lived in rural areas.

There were 1,537 households in Armonk, of which 39.6% had children under the age of 18 living in them. Of all households, 66.9% were married-couple households, 10.9% were households with a male householder and no spouse or partner present, and 19.8% were households with a female householder and no spouse or partner present. About 19.2% of all households were made up of individuals and 13.5% had someone living alone who was 65 years of age or older.

There were 1,608 housing units, of which 4.4% were vacant. The homeowner vacancy rate was 0.9% and the rental vacancy rate was 3.2%.

Racial composition as of the 2020 census
Race	Number	Percent
White	3,802	84.6%
Black or African American	36	0.8%
American Indian and Alaska Native	0	0.0%
Asian	329	7.3%
Native Hawaiian and Other Pacific Islander	1	0.0%
Some other race	65	1.4%
Two or more races	262	5.8%
Hispanic or Latino (of any race)	254	5.7%

=== 2000 census ===
As of the census of 2000, there were 3,461 people, 1,172 households, and 995 families residing in the CDP. The population density was 568.9 inhabitants per square mile (219.7/km^{2}). There were 1,204 housing units at an average density of 197.9 units per square mile (76.4 units/km^{2}). The racial makeup of the CDP was 93.38 percent white, 0.61 percent African American, 0.06 percent Native American, 4.16 percent Asian, 0.00 percent Pacific Islander, 0.40 percent from other races, and 1.24 percent from two or more races. 3.76 percent of the population were Hispanic and Latino Americans.

There were 1,172 households, out of which 44.5 percent had children under the age of 18 living with them, 74.7 percent were married couples living together, 7.7 percent had a female householder with no husband present, and 15.1 percent were non-families. 13.1 percent of all households were made up of individuals, and 6.0 percent had someone living alone who was 65 years of age or older. The average household size was 2.95 and the average family size was 3.23.

In the CDP, the population was spread out, with 29.8 percent under the age of 18, 4.4 percent from 18 to 24, 27.2 percent from 25 to 44, 26.7 percent from 45 to 64, and 11.8 percent who were 65 years of age or older. The median age was 39 years. For every 100 females, there were 90.6 males. For every 100 females age 18 and over, there were 90.2 males.

=== Income and poverty ===
As of the census of 2013, the median income for a household in the CDP was $159,530, and the median income for a family was $189,163. The per capita income for the CDP was $92,750. 1.3 percent of the population and 0.0 percent of families were below the poverty line. Out of the total population, 0.0 percent of those under the age of 18 and 3.9 percent of those 65 and older were living below the poverty line.

== Education ==
The Byram Hills Central School District serves North Castle, New Castle, Mount Pleasant, and Bedford. All of the schools in the district are located in Armonk. The district has one high school, Byram Hills High School (for students in grades 9–12), one middle school, H. C. Crittenden Middle School (grades 6–8), and two primary schools, Wampus Elementary School (grades 3–5) and Coman Hill Elementary School (grades K–2).

Since 2015, St. Nersess Armenian Seminary, a seminary under the auspices of the Armenian Church of America, which is the American branch of the Armenian Apostolic Church, has been located in Armonk.

== Economy ==
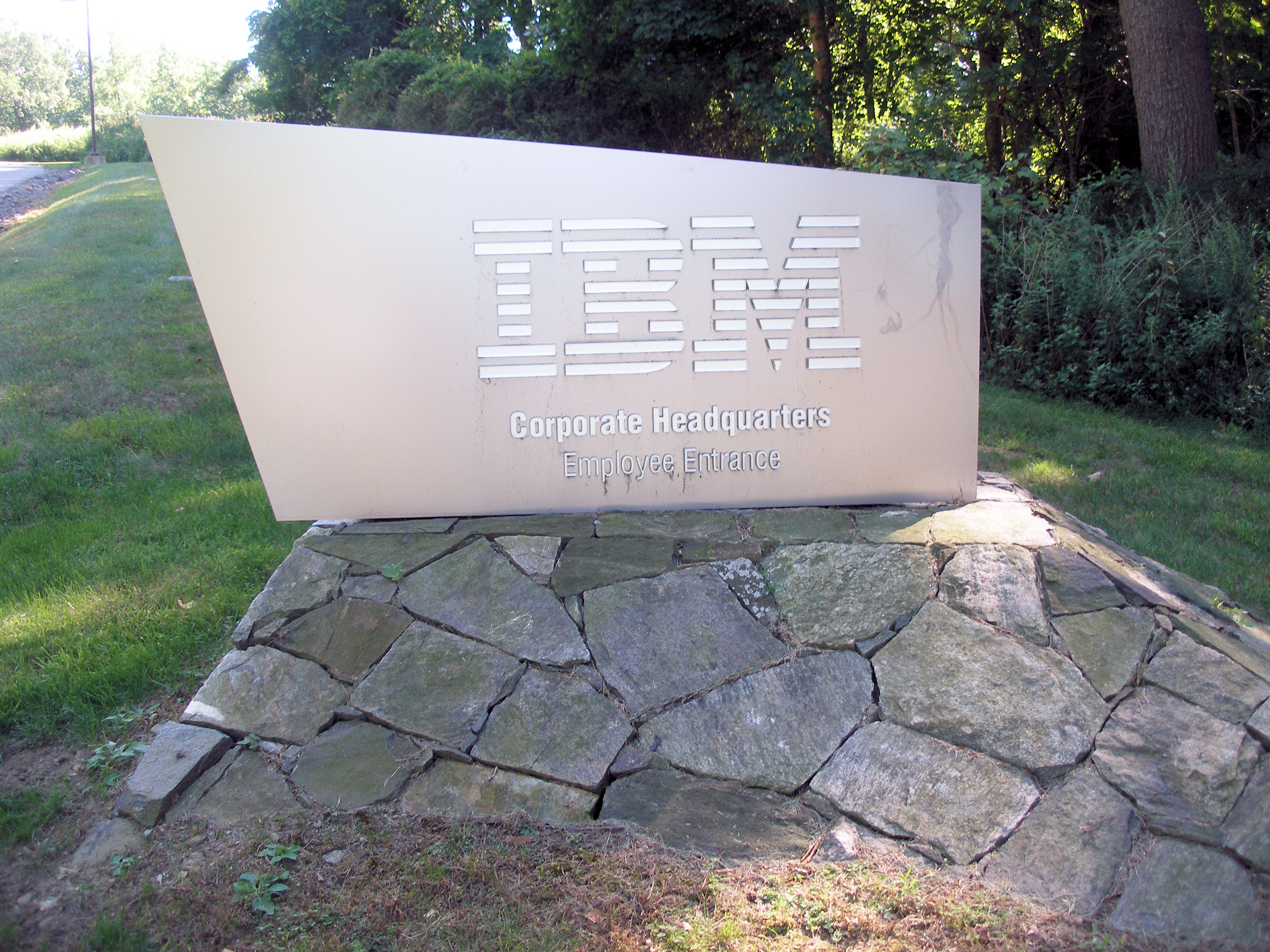
IBM headquarters entrance sign

IBM has its world headquarters in Armonk. In addition, M. E. Sharpe also has its headquarters in Armonk. The second-largest reinsurance company in the world, Swiss Re, has had its U.S. headquarters in Armonk since 1999. It was expanded in 2004, and has more than 1,200 employees. The 127-acre site overlooks Westchester County's Kensico Reservoir. The Indian information technology giant Wipro also hosts its headquarters here.

== Historic sites ==
The Smith Tavern, a historical site and landmark of the Revolutionary War, is located in Armonk and is the home of the North Castle Historical Society. It is listed on the National Register of Historic Places along with the Bedford Road Historic District. The Witthoefft House was added to the National Register in 2011. Near current day Elide plaza was once a small airport, at which Charles Lindbergh landed.

== Annual events ==
Armonk hosts several annual events. The Armonk Outdoor Art Show is a fine art and crafts juried show sponsored by Friends of the North Castle Public Library ("the Friends") where approximately 200 artists gather at Community Park to show and sell their work. The event involves local volunteers with the proceeds from the show benefiting the North Castle Public Library and its Whippoorwill Hall performance auditorium. One week before the Art Show, the Armonk Chamber of Commerce sponsors the "Jamie's 5K Run For Love" run/walk road race. The proceeds from this event also go to the library with a portion reserved specifically for children's programs. The Friends also sponsors the Armonk Players, a community theater group that stages two full productions and several readings each year at Whippoorwill Hall.

In addition, the Armonk chapter of the Lions Club sponsors a Fol-De-Rol, held during either the first or second weekend in June. The four-day event takes place in Wampus Brook Park and by Wampus Elementary School. It draws local businesses and artisans to set up tents and sell their merchandise. In addition, local restaurants set up tents to sell food and there are rides and midway games for children. Local student and professional music groups play in the gazebo to entertain the crowds. Another Part of the Fol-De-Rol is the carnival that is set up on the athletic field outside Wampus school. The carnival is full of standard fair games and rides for the weekend.

Armonk also holds a community-wide Relay For Life during the first weekend in May. The event is sponsored locally by the Byram Hills chapter of Youth Against Cancer.

An Armonk tradition is Frosty Day. A parade goes down Main Street onto Bedford Road, past the "Village Square" mentioned in the song "Frosty the Snowman" to Wampus Brook Park for a gala holiday lighting ceremony. Steve Nelson, the song's lyricist, was a frequent visitor to Armonk after World War II from his home in nearby White Plains. In 1950, he wrote the song's lyrics which he put to Walter E. Rollins' music; it was the same year that he was looking for land in Armonk on which to build his new home.

== Housing boom and construction ==
Armonk experienced a surge in new housing construction and development beginning in the late 1990s. New condominiums, town houses, and larger single-family homes were constructed primarily north of the Armonk business district and just to the west. Armonk's Thomas Wright Estates or Sands Mill Estates, consisting primarily of large homes, were constructed in the late 1990s and early 2000s. Armonk real estate prices have increased substantially since the late 1990s, having peaked in the mid-2000s, and never returning to their pre-2000s rates despite the subprime mortgage crisis. The new construction projects and increased housing costs have increasingly made the community unaffordable. In a construction project, a real estate company purchased the long-standing Schultz's Cider Mill just south of Main Street and had it razed. The company then constructed a premium gated community of 27 townhouses and homes (named "Cider Mill") in its place. As a result, the population of Armonk increased significantly but caused the public schools to become overcrowded and push forth a series of expensive school expansion projects that significantly raised property taxes.

Much of the new construction was pinned on the connections that former Town Supervisor John Lombardi had with the areas' construction and development companies. In 2005, after over 40 years in office, Lombardi was ousted in the election by political newcomer Reese Berman. A former librarian at the town's middle school, Berman's campaign promise was to put a moratorium on new residential construction to be enacted during her term in office. As of Berman's election, no new purely residential projects have broken ground in Armonk. A new community; Cider Mill was added in 2007–2008.

=== Businesses ===
Armonk Square is a 3.5-acre development of shops, banking center, offices, one-bedroom apartments and food market.

Organizations located in the hamlet include Whippoorwill Country Club and the North Castle Public Library, which is part of the Westchester Library System.

== Notable people ==
Notable current and former residents of Armonk include:

- Ernie Anastos, an Emmy Award–winning New York City television news anchor
- Dave Barry, a humorist who grew up in Armonk
- John Berman, co-host of CNN's New Day morning TV show
- Harold T. Bers, inventor of the themed crossword puzzle, advertising executive
- Jessica Boevers, a stage actress
- David Boies, an attorney who represented Al Gore in the Bush v. Gore election case and currently lives in Armonk
- Laura Branigan (1952–2004), a Grammy-nominated musician who grew up in Armonk and is a Byram Hills High School graduate (1970)
- Eddie Cahill, an actor who is a Byram Hills High School graduate
- Pearl Chertok, a harpist
- Peter Gallagher, an actor who was raised in Armonk
- David Harbour, an actor from Stranger Things who attended Byram Hills High School
- Chance Kelly, actor
- Reed Kessler, a 2012 Team USA Olympian in the equestrian jumping event, was born in Armonk
- Tom Kitt, the Tony Award– and Pulitzer Prize–winning composer of Next to Normal, was raised in Armonk
- Ted Nierenberg (1923–2009), the founder of Dansk International Designs and started the company in the garage of his Great Neck home
- Gregory Ryan, winner of the Gold Pencil award
- Renata Scotto, an opera soprano
- Howard Stern, host of the Howard Stern Show, lived in Armonk from 1990 to 2010
- Beatrice Straight (1914-2001), Academy Award- and Tony Award-winning actress
- Tom Virtue, an actor who is a Byram Hills High School graduate
- Bernie Williams, a former New York Yankees baseball player

== See also ==
- IBM
- Smith Tavern
