= Banksville, New York =

Banksville
- Hamlet
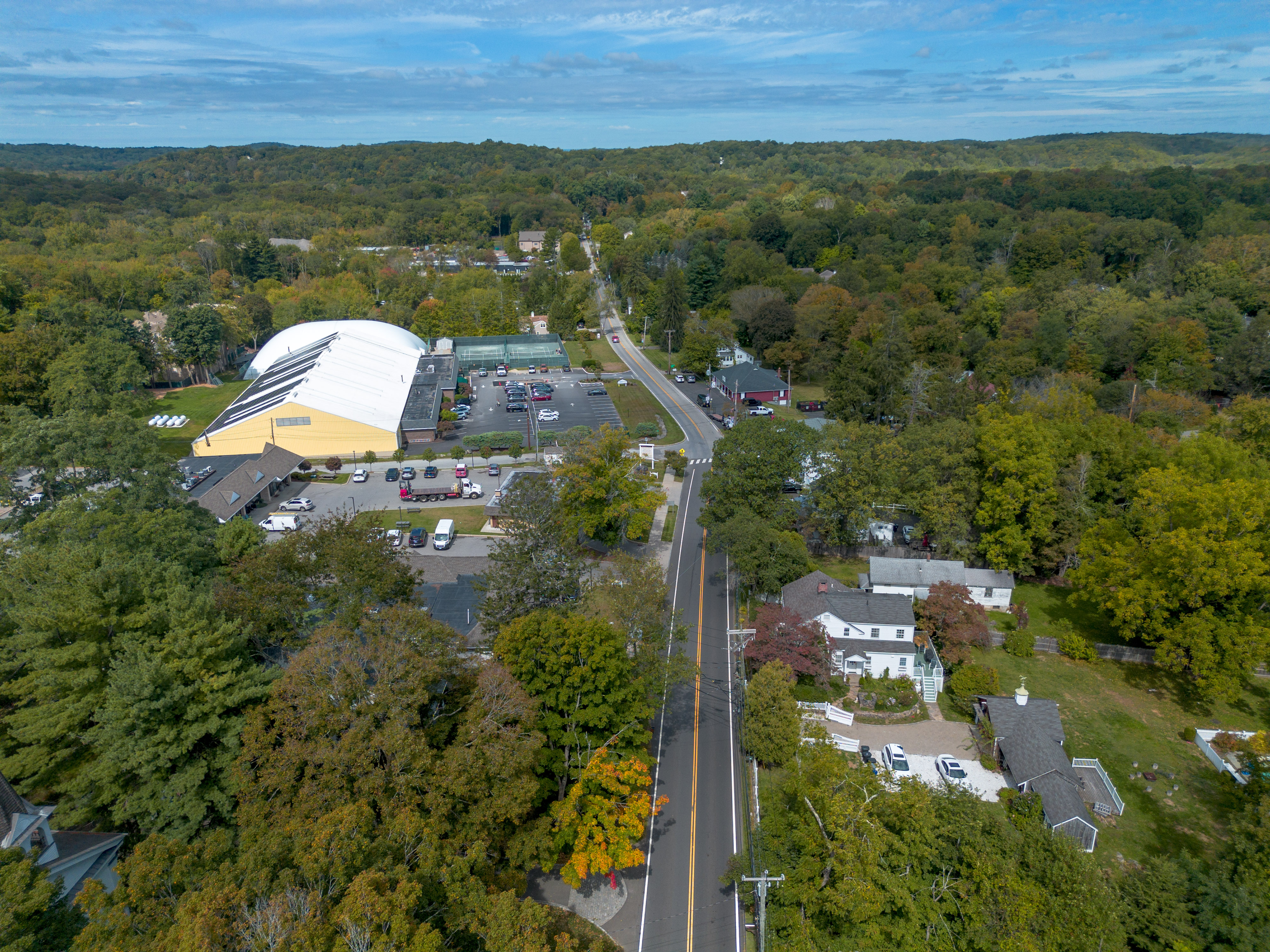
- Banksville in 2025

- Location within New York Location within the United States
- Coordinates: 41°08′30″N 73°38′24″W
- Country: United States
- State: New York
- County: Westchester
- Town: North Castle
- Time zone: UTC-5 (Eastern (EST))
  - Summer (DST): UTC-4 (EDT)
- ZIP Code: 10506
- Area code: 914

Banksville is a hamlet in the town of North Castle, Westchester County, New York, United States and an area including Stamford and Greenwich, Connecticut. Estimated to have been founded in the late 1600s, it is an area which had importance for local cottage industries, a boarding school, and local merchants to support its residents in its early days. Banksville was the home of many patriots including veterans who fought in the American Revolution, Civil War and World Wars I and II.

== History ==
The village of Banksville was named after the Banks family, who had settled in this area which is now a part of North Castle, NY, Stamford and Greenwich, CT. In the days prior to being inhabited by its earliest European settlers of the area, Banksville was a fishing and hunting ground for the Native Americans. The Native American Chief, Myn Myano, named the Mianus River, which flows from North Castle through Greenwich to the Long Island Sound, after himself. The early days of the area being settled by non-Native Americans had families granted land further out from the burgeoning population as a way of expanding the township of Greenwich. Prior to the American Revolution, Banksville was a community of independent farmers who were mostly patriots that did not have a strong allegiance to King George III of England. Banksville had numerous citizens who fought in the American Revolution including Colonel David Hobby, who belonged to the Westchester County Militia. One of the founders of Banksville, Benoni Platt, was another proud patriot and Captain in the Second Regiment, Westchester County Militia, New York during the American Revolution.

Among these early settlers were Samuel Banks and Joseph Finch with their respective families. Samuel Banks was born in Fairfield County, CT around the year 1677. In 1737, it is recorded that he purchased 300 acres of land in North Castle from John Lyon. During colonial times, the village of Banksville also included Middle Patent which borders Bedford, NY and Greenwich. When Samuel Banks died in 1743 in Middle Patent, he was buried atop a hill on his farm, which is today known as the Middle Patent Cemetery. The hill on which Banks was buried became a burial ground for local families and in 1907, it was incorporated into an association of families called “The Middle Patent Rural Cemetery Association.” Middle Patent's Cemetery remains located on Middle Patent Road in North Castle, New York.

Prominent families residing in Banksville during this period included the Veeks, Hobbys, Platts and Brushes. Many of these families worshiped at Stanwich Church, which is presently along Taconic Road in Greenwich. Stanwich Church was founded in 1731.

=== Shoe industry ===
The community of Banksville began in the mid-1800s and was named after John Banks, a descendant of Samuel Banks, who lived in the home diagonally across from the former Banksville Baptist Church building and to the right (north) of St. Timothy's Chapel on what is now North Street in Greenwich. He was born in 1811 and died in 1882 at the age of 71. By 1850, he owned the country store in Banksville and manufactured ladies’ shoes. The shoe industry around this time became prominent, largely credited to John Banks for bringing the shoe industry to the area of Banksville.

As the demand for shoes grew in large cities, including New York, the shoe industry began to make shoes in rural areas such as North Castle, Greenwich, Bedford and Stanwich. John Banks established a cottage industry of shoemakers during the 1840s and 1850s. He supplied the shoes for John Dayton's Shoe Store, which was located on Greenwich Avenue in Greenwich. Greenwich Avenue had become and was continuing to grow into a retail hub for the Town of Greenwich some nine mile south of Banksville.

In 1850, a shoe store called “Hobby, Van Ranst and Parker'' opened in Banksville, which later became Finch’s Store in 1869 (originally called “M. M. Finch and Son”). This retailer was located on what is now North Street on Greenwich/ North Castle border. In the mid-1800s, the shoe making industry became an important source of additional income for local farmers and their families. Entire families would make shoes together. When the shoes were complete, they were delivered to Finch's Store where families were given tobacco, kerosene, silk, thread, coffee, tea and salt mackerel in exchange for their completed goods. The shoe industry provided income for organizations such as the Ladies’ Society of Middle Patent Church. In Banksville, the business of shoes continued from its inception to about the late 1880s when shoe manufacturing became more of a mass market and industrialized commodity made in large factories in other parts of New England.

== Geography ==
Banksville covers property in three towns in two states: Greenwich, CT, Stamford, CT, & North Castle, NY. The Banksville side in New York is considered a hamlet of the town of North Castle NY whereas Banksville in Connecticut is considered an area of Greenwich, CT. The oldest part of Banksville is the present location of Taconic Road, which was originally called the Main Road. Today's main thoroughfare through Banksville, North Street, did not exist in the 1700s and 1800s. The Main Road during that time was a stagecoach route that came from Greenwich and Cos Cob, CT up along Stanwich Road. Additionally, in the early days, all of Banksville, Middle Patent up to Bedford Village was a part of the current State of Connecticut. In the late 1600s, there was a dispute between the colonies of Connecticut and New York over the border lines of Banksville. The boundary line was ultimately settled in about 1731 for which there was a prior disagreement between the colonies of Connecticut and New York, which predated the Revolutionary War.

== Culture and landmarks ==
=== Community House ===
The Banksville Community House (BCH) was founded in 1937 by R. Eugene Curry and Julian Howay. It originally was located in Finch's Country Store to serve the residents of the community, especially the younger children, and for a local Boy Scout Troop. Howay recognized the need for a place to hold children's activities in the area as well as for families to gather. Additionally, there were many immigrants living and moving to the area, so a need arose for a place where they would receive help with their citizenship papers and getting acclimated to the area as well as the United States. The BCH was serving the needs of both the young and their parents as well as newcomers to Banksville in a variety of ways. The original location moved from Finch's General Store after Curry and Howay were able to get financial backing to construct a new community house solely dedicated for its own use. One of the people who helped start the BCH, Mr. Herbert Betrand, bought the Old Jensen Farm in 1939, which was originally an apple orchard. This is the present location of where the BCH is today on Banksville Avenue in Greenwich on the state line border of New York.

During World War II, the Banksville Community House served as a center for civilian war relief activities organized by residents from both New York and Connecticut, including rolling bandages and preparing medical supplies.

For many years, the BCH in conjunction with the United Way of Greenwich, sponsored a summer camp. The popularity waned as it ceased operation in the early 2000s. The BCH time and time again has been a place where people come together during war times and peace times to contribute to the strong feeling of a community.

=== Clubs ===
During the Revolutionary War, the building that is the present location to the French restaurant, La Cremiere, was home of the Widow Brush. During the time of around the Civil War, the Hobby family resided there. It was later sold and became the Westchester Women's Golf and Tennis club in 1925. Tennis courts were adjacent to the present building and a golf course was subsequently developed. Eventually that club closed due to the financial crash starting the Great Depression and later became the Middle Patent Golf Club with both men and women members. In 1947 it became its present business, La Cremiere.

Additionally, there was the Banksville Golf Club near the same location later in the 20th century. The Golf Club was on the farmland of James Banks, who owned it during the Revolutionary War and later became the farm of J. Hobby who owned it in the 1800s. Later in the 1960s, two men, Joseph M. Auresto and Michael Sinistore, envisioned a golf course on the previous farmland. Opened around the late 1960s or early 1970s, it was an 18-hole golf course with a clubhouse. It closed in the 1980s due to Joseph Auresto deciding to sell the land which resulted in the development of new homes on the present location of Hobby Lane and Hobby Farm Drive.

=== St. Timothy's Chapel and Conyers Farm ===
Prior to St. Timothy's Chapel, there was no convenient way for Catholic families to access church to practice their religion. Three boys used to walk from Banksville to Glenville for religious education, until Reverend John Burke found out about this and realized the challenges Catholics from Banksville were enduring. In response, he arranged occasional religious services in Banksville at the home of George Zygmont, a member of another prominent Banksville family.

In 1904, Conyers Farm was established by Edmund Converse, who was the founder of United States Steel. He bought up twenty farms in the area and created Conyers Farm. Many Italian and Polish people worked at Conyers Farm, yet had nowhere to attend Catholic Mass.

The increased Catholic population grew which created the need for a Catholic church. Catholic families petitioned to establish a permanent Chapel; however, their request was turned down by Bishop John Nilan, the Bishop of Hartford.

Nevertheless, the cause gained momentum to the point where a location was identified for a church by the local Polish, Irish, and Italian Catholic parishioners who purchased an abandoned building that had previously operated as a creamery which processed milk collected from the local farms and closed before World War I. Today it is the location of St. Timothy's Chapel on North Street in Greenwich. The first Mass at St. Timothy's was on Sunday, December 21, 1919. Once it became a chapel and the congregation grew, a choir was formed, there were lawn parties, carnivals, and many fundraisers. Today, St. Timothy's Chapel is a part of St. Michael the Archangel Catholic Church, a few miles south on North Street. The address of St. Timothy's is 1034 North Street, Greenwich, CT.

=== Finch's Country Store ===
In 1860, Marvin Finch and George Derby formed a partnership to purchase Hobby, Van, Ranst and Parker. Finch and Derby to establish Finch's Store (originally called “M. M. Finch and Son”). The store has always been in the location it is in today at 4 Bedford-Banksville Rd, Bedford, NY, however it was originally in the automobile repair building. The autobody building was later moved to 16 Banksville Ave, Bedford, NY. Today, Finch's Country Store has transformed from a general store to more of a local restaurant and deli.

== Education ==
=== Miss Purdy's School ===
Around the late 1850s to early 1860s, wealthy New York City parents were looking for places outside of the city to send their daughters for school. In 1859, Ann Purdy arrived from Syracuse, New York to settle in Banksville where she opened “Miss Purdy’s Seminary for Young Ladies. The school was described as a “fashionable” boarding school and had regular classes, in addition to teaching French, proper posture and etiquette. Girls would arrive from various areas including Greenwich, Stamford, and New York City to attend her school. Girls living in Greenwich or Stamford would commute to and from school, while those living in New York City would live at the school. This led to the start of a stagecoach service when Ms. Purdy offered Silas Derby, a former shoe maker, a loan of $100 to begin stagecoach services for her students. The school operated for over 20 years, yet the date of its closing is unclear.

The stagecoach service, also known as the “Banksville Stage”, lasted from 1861 to about 1900 providing a round trip from the Greenwich Train station to Bedford, New York. In his stagecoach, Silas Derby transported passengers, produce, and mail from docks in Greenwich to Banksville. He made his first trip on June 23, 1861, and operations ceased 39 years later on June 23, 1900. Ms. Purdy's Seminary was located in the building across the street from what is now the North Street Shopping Center on North Street in Greenwich.

=== Middle Patent School ===
The Middle Patent School was a small building at the corner of Round Hill and Banksville Bedford Road. In 1812, a plan was made to build a school because of the many families living in the area. With many farms, families with young children were populating the area, so it was decided to build a schoolhouse in order to serve these people. It first opened in 1813, built on land that had been a part of the Hobby Farm, where it was a one-room wooden schoolhouse. Families that are on the early records from the school include the names Mead, Banks, Finch, Hobby, Platt, Reynold, Smith, Lyon, Miller, and Palmer families. The one room school was active for over 100 years and stayed open through the Civil War and the Spanish-American War. The Middle Patent School closed after 151 years in 1964 and the building burned to the ground in 1976.

== Fire department ==
The Banksville Independent Fire Department was founded in 1949. The first firetruck for the recently formed fire department was an old secondhand 1926 American LaFrance which was purchased for $318. Before the fire house was built, the first firetruck was housed in George Zygmont's garage on Banksville Avenue. The first fire call that the Banksville Fire Department responded to was at Henker Farm where a bolt of lightning hit the barn, which the fire department was able to save. This led to the fire department's emblem to be a fire helmet with a lightning bolt over it. The weekend prior to every Thanksgiving, the Banksville Fire Department in conjunction with the BCH, hosts the Turkey Jamboree where residents gather for this community event.
