= North Castle, New York =

- Town
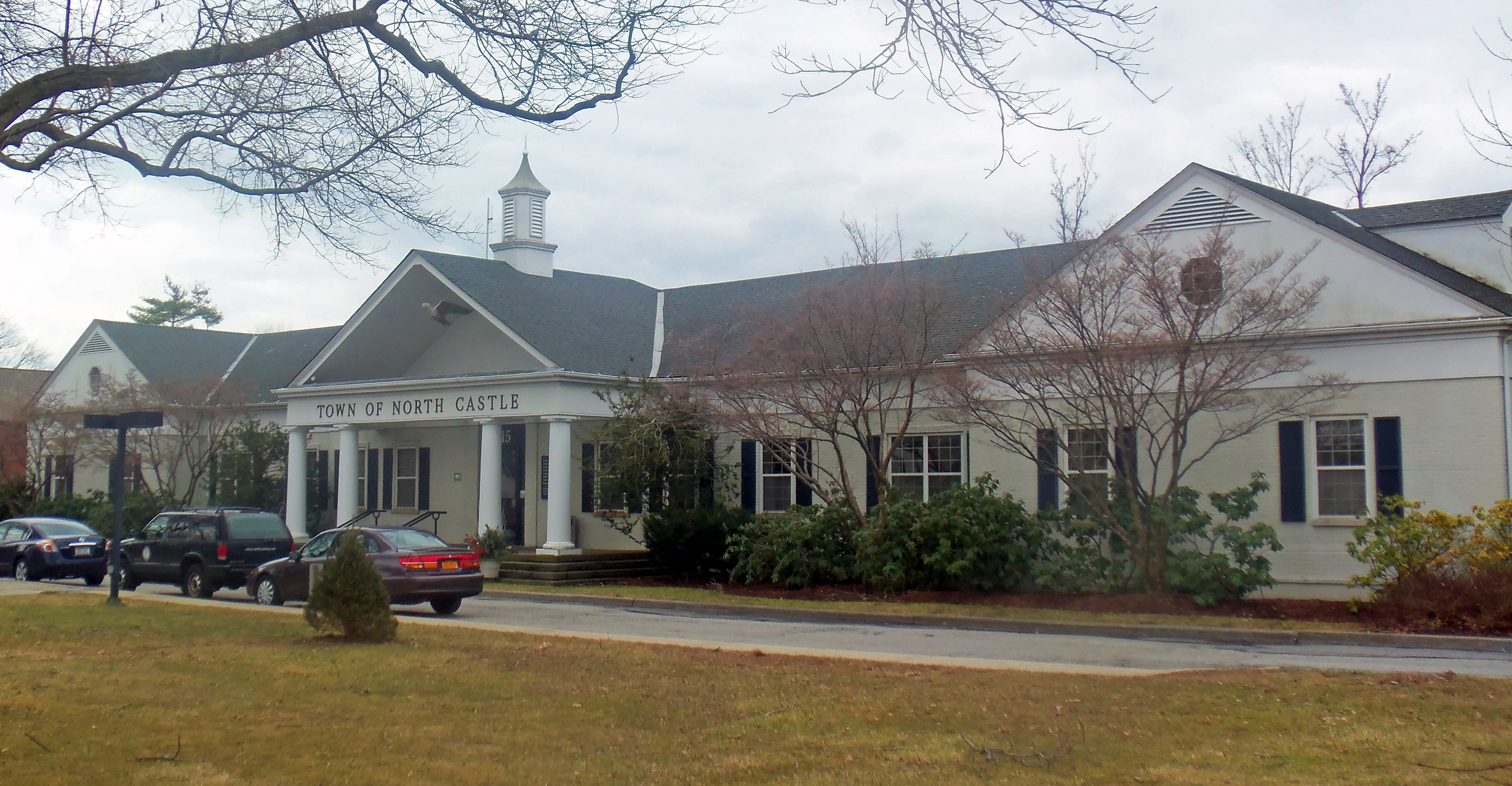
- North Castle town hall, 2013

- Seal

- Location of North Castle, New York
- Coordinates: 41°6′44″N 73°42′37″W
- Country: United States
- State: New York
- County: Westchester

Government
  - Type: Manager-Council
  - Town Supervisor: Joseph A. Rende (D)
  - Town Board: Members: • José L. Berra (D); • Barbara W. DiGiacinto (R); • Saleem Hussain (D); • Matt Milim (R)

Area
  - Total: 26.18 sq mi (67.81 km^{2})
  - Land: 23.73 sq mi (61.47 km^{2})
  - Water: 2.45 sq mi (6.34 km^{2})
- Elevation: 384 ft (117 m)

Population (2020)
  - Total: 12,408
  - Density: 523/sq mi (201.8/km^{2})
- Time zone: UTC-5 (Eastern (EST))
  - Summer (DST): UTC-4 (EDT)
- ZIP code: 10504
- Area code: 914
- FIPS code: 36-51693
- GNIS feature ID: 0979282
- Website: www.northcastleny.com

North Castle is a town in Westchester County, New York, United States. The population was 12,408 at the 2020 census. It has three hamlets: Armonk, Banksville, and North White Plains.

== Geography ==
According to the United States Census Bureau, the town has a total area of 26.5 square miles (69 km^{2}), of which 24.1 square miles (62 km^{2}) is land and 2.4 square miles (6.2 km^{2}), or 9.06%, is water.

== Demographics ==
Historical population
Census	Pop.	Note	%±
1790	2,478		—
1820	1,135		—
1830	1,653		45.6%
1840	2,058		24.5%
1850	2,189		6.4%
1860	2,487		13.6%
1870	1,996		−19.7%
1880	1,818		−8.9%
1890	1,475		−18.9%
1900	1,471		−0.3%
1910	1,522		3.5%
1920	1,705		12.0%
1930	2,540		49.0%
1940	3,306		30.2%
1950	3,855		16.6%
1960	6,797		76.3%
1970	9,591		41.1%
1980	9,467		−1.3%
1990	10,061		6.3%
2000	10,849		7.8%
2010	11,841		9.1%
2020	12,408		4.8%
U.S. Decennial Census

As of the 2020 census there were 12,408 people living in North Castle. As of the 2000 census of 2000, there were 10,849 people, 3,583 households, and 3,002 families residing in the town. The population density was 450.4 inhabitants per square mile (173.9/km^{2}). There were 3,706 housing units at an average density of 153.9 per square mile (59.4/km^{2}). The racial makeup of the town was 92.38% White, 1.76% African American, 0.03% Native American, 3.96% Asian, 0.05% Pacific Islander, 0.63% from other races, and 1.20% from two or more races. Hispanic or Latino of any race were 4.14% of the population.

There were 3,583 households, out of which 44.2% had children under the age of 18 living with them, 74.6% were married couples living together, 6.9% had a female householder with no husband present, and 16.2% were non-families. 13.1% of all households were made up of individuals, and 5.5% had someone living alone who was 65 years of age or older. The average household size was 2.99 and the average family size was 3.28.

In the town, the population was spread out, with 29.7% under the age of 18, 4.5% from 18 to 24, 26.8% from 25 to 44, 28.3% from 45 to 64, and 10.7% who were 65 years of age or older. The median age was 40 years. For every 100 females, there were 97.1 males. For every 100 females age 18 and over, there were 94.7 males.

The median income for a household in the town was $117,815, and the median income for a family was $141,764. Males had a median income of $86,950 versus $49,500 for females. The per capita income for the town was $60,628. About 1.0% of families and 3.0% of the population were below the poverty line, including 1.7% of those under age 18 and 3.4% of those age 65 or over.

== Communities in North Castle ==
North Castle has three distinct geographical areas, each taking the form of a hamlet.

- Armonk – a hamlet located in the central part of the town. It is the seat of town government and the main town library.
- Banksville – a hamlet, also known as the "Eastern District of North Castle", located in the eastern part of the town, of which the southern boundary is contiguous with Connecticut.
- North White Plains – a hamlet located in the southern part of the town. It is south of the Kensico Reservoir Dam, west of the White Plains Reservoirs, and east of the Bronx River, although the name generally refers to any portion of North Castle south of the Kensico Reservoir. The Elijah Miller House was added to the National Register of Historic Places in 1976.

== Economy ==
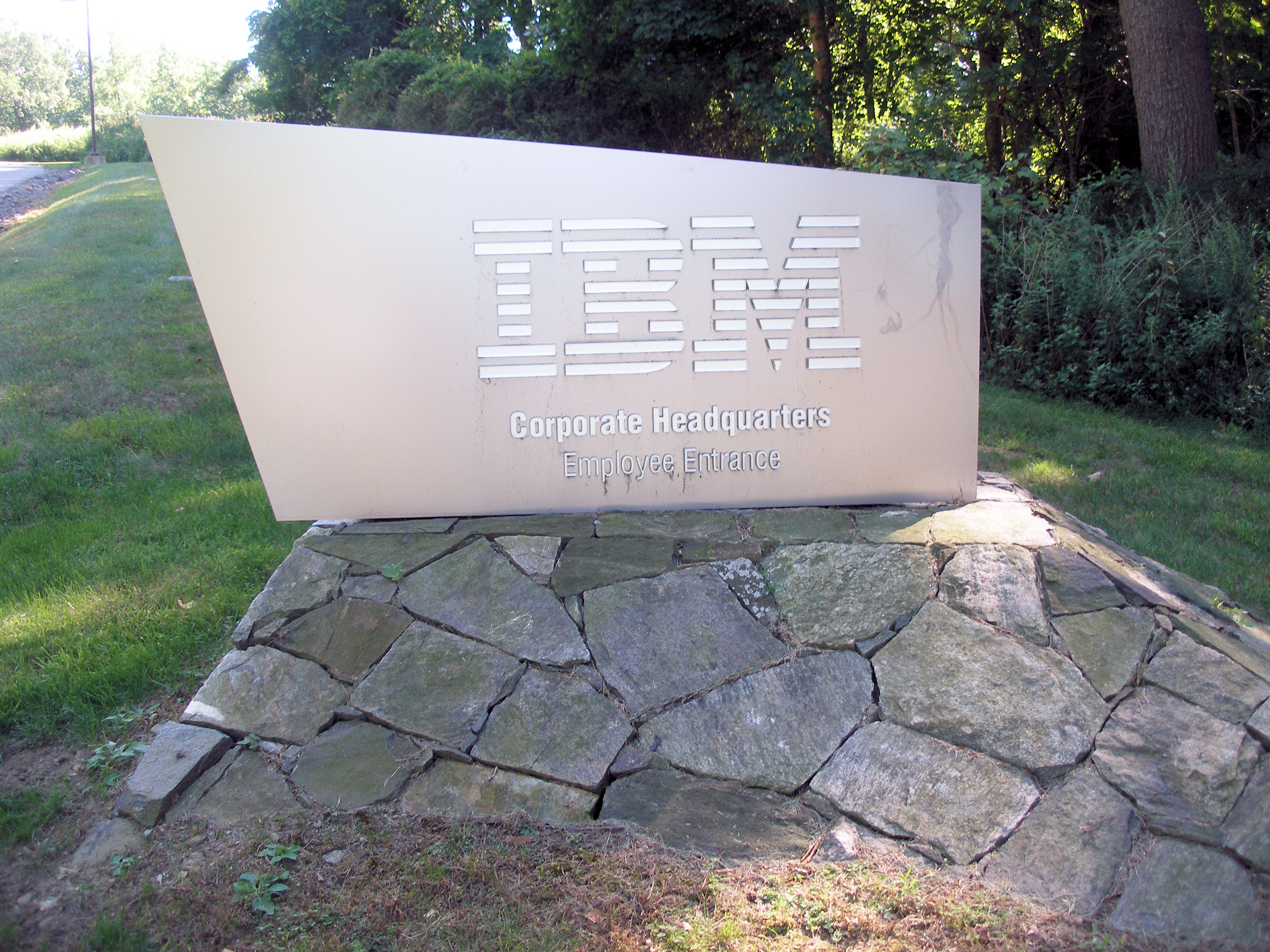
IBM headquarters

Due to its proximity to Manhattan and its idyllic setting, a number of major companies call Armonk home. IBM has its world headquarters in Armonk. Its principal building, referred to as CHQ, is a 283,000-square-foot (26,300 m2) glass and stone edifice on a 25-acre (10 ha) parcel amid a 432-acre (175 ha) former apple orchard the company purchased in the mid-1950s. The American headquarters of Swiss Re is located in Armonk on a 127-acre (51 ha) site overlooking the Kensico Reservoir. In addition M.E. Sharpe, the academic publisher, also has its headquarters in Armonk.

=== Top employers ===
According to North Castle's 2023 Annual Comprehensive Financial Report, the top employers in the city are:

#	Employer	# of Employees
1	IBM	850
2	Byram Hills School District	498
3	Swiss Re	450
4	Breezemont Day Camp	267
5	MBIA	192
6	JMC	150
7	Opengate Inc	100
8	Moderne Barn	80
9	Byram Hills School Transportation	77
10	Sotheby's International Realty	75
