= Galleria =

Galleria may refer to

== Shopping centres named Galleria ==
=== Australia ===
- Galleria Shopping Centre (Perth), Morley, Western Australia
- Galleria Shopping Centre (Melbourne), Melbourne, Victoria

=== Canada ===
- Allen Lambert Galleria, Toronto, Ontario
- Galleria Shopping Centre (Toronto), Toronto, Ontario
- Galleria Mall, London, Ontario

=== Finland ===
- Galleria (Espoo shopping centre), Leppävaara, Espoo

=== Hong Kong ===
- Luk Yeung Galleria, above Tsuen Wan MTR Station

=== India ===
- Galleria, Hiranandani Gardens, Powai, Mumbai

=== Italy ===
- Galleria Vittorio Emanuele II, Milan
- Galleria Umberto I, Naples

=== Japan ===
- Galleria of Tokyo Midtown

=== Korea ===
- Galleria Department Store, a franchise owned by Hanwha Group

=== Philippines ===
- Robinsons Galleria, Quezon City
- Robinsons Galleria Cebu, Cebu City
- Robinsons Galleria South, San Pedro, Laguna

=== South Africa ===
- Galleria Shopping Mall, a shopping mall in Amanzimtoti near Durban

=== Turkey ===
- Galleria Adana, Adana
- Galleria Ankara, Ankara
- Galleria Ataköy, Istanbul

=== United Kingdom ===
- The Galleria, Hatfield, Hertfordshire
- Hay's Galleria, Bankside, London

=== United States (by state) ===
- Riverchase Galleria, Birmingham, Alabama
- Galleria at Tyler, Riverside, California
- Glendale Galleria, Glendale, California
- Sherman Oaks Galleria, Sherman Oaks, California: outdoor mall, but formerly enclosed
- South Bay Galleria, Redondo Beach, California
- Westfield Galleria at Roseville, Roseville, California
- Crocker Galleria, San Francisco, California
- The Galleria at Fort Lauderdale, Florida
- Cobb Galleria, Atlanta, Georgia
- Galleria Center, Algonquin, Illinois: outdoor mall
- Louisville Galleria, Louisville, Kentucky; redeveloped to become Fourth Street Live!
- The Galleria (Metairie, Louisiana)
- CambridgeSide Galleria, Cambridge, Massachusetts
- Silver City Galleria, Taunton, Massachusetts
- Galleria Edina, Edina, Minnesota
- Saint Louis Galleria, St. Louis, Missouri
- Mershops Galleria at Sunset, Henderson, Nevada
- The Galleria (Manhattan), New York, New York
- Galleria at Crystal Run, Walkill, New York
- Galleria at White Plains, White Plains, New York
- Poughkeepsie Galleria, Poughkeepsie, New York
- Walden Galleria, Cheektowaga, New York
- The Galleria at Erieview, Cleveland, Ohio
- The Galleria (Portland, Oregon), a United States mixed-use building (and former shopping mall)
- The Johnstown Galleria, Johnstown, Pennsylvania
- Galleria at Pittsburgh Mills, Tarentum, Pennsylvania
- York Galleria, York, Pennsylvania
- Cool Springs Galleria, Franklin, Tennessee
- Wolfchase Galleria, Memphis, Tennessee
- Galleria Dallas, Dallas, Texas
- The Galleria, Houston, Texas
- Tysons Galleria, Tysons Corner, Virginia

== Other uses ==
- Galleria (moth), a snout moth genus containing only the greater wax moth (G. mellonella)
- Galleria degli Uffizi, an art gallery in Florence, Italy
- Galleria Kunstfestival, an art festival in Norway
- Galleria Garibaldi, character and lead singer of the musical film franchise The Cheetah Girls

== See also ==
- Galleria Mall (disambiguation)
- Gallery (disambiguation)
