= Galleria Mall =

Galleria Mall may refer to a variety of shopping malls, including:

- CambridgeSide Galleria, Cambridge, Massachusetts
- The Galleria, Houston, Texas
- Galleria at Crystal Run, Wallkill, New York
- Galleria Dallas, Dallas, Texas
- Galleria Mall, Toronto, Ontario, a fictional mall that is the main setting of the cartoon 6teen.
- Galleria Shopping Centre (Toronto)
- Galleria Shopping Mall, Amanzimtoti, South Africa
- Galleria at White Plains, White Plains, New York
- Luk Yeung Galleria, Tsuen Wan, Hong Kong
- Poughkeepsie Galleria, Poughkeepsie, New York
- Silver City Galleria, East Taunton, Massachusetts
- Stonestown Galleria, San Francisco, California
- Tysons Galleria, McLean, Virginia
- Walden Galleria, Buffalo, New York
- Westfield Galleria at Roseville, California
- York Galleria Mall, York, Pennsylvania
- Galleria Department Store, Seoul
- Galleria Mall, Abu Dhabi, United Arab Emirates

== See also ==
- Galleria (disambiguation)
