= Gallery =

Gallery or The Gallery may refer to:

== Arts, entertainment and media ==
=== Music ===
- Gallery (band), an American soft rock band of the 1970s
- Gallery (Elaiza album), 2014
- Gallery, a 2017 album by Arizona
- Gallery, a 1974 album by Bert Kaempfert
- Gallery, a 1999 compilation album by Great White
- The Gallery (album), by Dark Tranquility, 1995
- "Gallery" (Mario Vazquez song), 2006
- "Gallery" (Yōko Oginome song), 1990
- "Gallery", from the music of Deltarune games, 2018
- "Gallery", a 2021 song by Park Ji-hoon
- "The Gallery", a song by Joni Mitchell from the 1969 album Clouds
- "The Gallery", a song by Bradley Joseph from 1997 album Rapture

=== Other uses in arts, entertainment and media ===
- Gallery (magazine), a 1970s adult sex magazine
- Gallery (TV series), Canadian documentary 1973–1979
- The Gallery (video game)
- The Gallery, a 1947 novel by John Horne Burns

== Buildings and spaces ==
- Art gallery, a room or a building in which visual art is displayed
  - Art museum
- Gallery, a level or drive in a mine
- Gallery, a production control room, in a television studio
- Gallery (theatre), a form of balcony
- Gallery (New Orleans), a wide platform projecting from the wall of a building
- Gallery Hotel, a hotel in Singapore
- The Gallery (disco), a 1970s disco in New York City, US

== Other uses ==
- Gallery (surname), including a list of people with the surname
- Gallery Project, software for management and publication of digital photographs
- Gallery Publishing Group, an American publishing group, and its imprint Gallery Books

== See also ==
- Galley (disambiguation)
- Galleria (disambiguation)
- The Galleries (disambiguation)
- Shooting gallery (disambiguation)
- The Gallery Mall (disambiguation)
- Gallery forest, formed as a corridor along rivers or wetlands
- Gallery grave, a type of prehistoric megalithic tomb
- Gallery road, a mountain road in China
- Long gallery, a long, narrow room, often with a high ceiling
- Minstrels' gallery, a balcony used by performing musicians
- Oil gallery, a lubricating-oil passage within an internal combustion engine
- Help:Gallery tag, the Wikipedia gallery feature
