= The Source at White Plains =

Coordinates: 41°1′44.3″N 73°45′33″W

The Source at White Plains is a large urban-style shopping complex in downtown White Plains, New York, owned and managed by 'New England Development'. The Source is located next to The Westchester and Crowne Plaza hotel, and features several major brand-name retailers and restaurants including Dick's Sporting Goods, The Cheesecake Factory, and Whole Foods Market. The Source previously featured Raymour & Flanigan, which was recently moved out of The Source and into the former Stickly Audi & Co in White Plains, which is about two miles west of The Source.

The Source opened in 2004 and was built on the site of one of the first suburban branches of Saks Fifth Avenue, which closed in early 2002. The mall is connected to a large 4-story parking garage. Within close proximity of The Source are complementary retail developments such as The Westchester mall (featuring anchor stores Neiman Marcus and Nordstrom), a freestanding Bloomingdale's department store, the City Center at White Plains, and the Galleria at White Plains mall.

As of December 2015, the management contract for The Source at White Plains was awarded to The Wilder Companies, based out of Boston and managed by John Tacij.

Danone International has established their headquarters at The Source, moving from their previous North White Plains location. Danone took over space on the top floor of the center, which had been vacant since the closure of the three-level Fortunoff store.
