= The Gallery Mall (disambiguation) =

The Gallery Mall, now known as Fashion District Philadelphia, is a shopping mall in Philadelphia, Pennsylvania.

The Gallery Mall may also refer to:

- The Gallery at Harborplace, Baltimore, Maryland (closed 2022)
- The Gallery at Military Circle, Norfolk, Virginia, former name of Military Circle Mall (closed 2023)
- Gallery Place (shopping center), Washington, D.C.

== See also ==
- Galleria (disambiguation)
- Gallery (disambiguation)
- The Gallery at Harborplace (mixed-use complex)
