= Interstate 287 =

Interstate Highway in New Jersey and New York

Interstate 287
- Map of New Jersey, Southern New York, and part of the Hudson Valley with I-287 highlighted in red; original route highlighted in brown

Route information
- Auxiliary route of I-87 (NY)
- Maintained by NJDOT and NYSTA
- Length: 98.72 mi (158.87 km)
- Existed: 1961–present
- NHS: Entire route
- Restrictions: No explosives on the Tappan Zee Bridge

Major junctions
- South end: I-95 Toll / N.J. Turnpike / Route 440 / CR 514 in Edison, New Jersey
- I-78 in Bedminster, New Jersey; Route 24 in Hanover Township, New Jersey; I-80 / US 46 in Parsippany–Troy Hills, New Jersey; Route 208 at the Oakland–Franklin Lakes, New Jersey line; I-87 / New York Thruway / NY 17 in Suffern, New York; G.S. Parkway Connector in Chestnut Ridge, New York; Palisades Parkway in West Nyack, New York; I-87 / New York Thruway / NY 119 / Saw Mill River Parkway in Elmsford, New York; I-684 at the White Plains–Harrison, New York line; Hutchinson River Parkway in Harrison, New York
- East end: I-95 / US 1 in Rye, New York

Location
- Country: United States
- States: New Jersey, New York
- Counties: New Jersey: Middlesex, Somerset, Morris, Passaic, Bergen; New York: Rockland, Westchester

Highway system
- Interstate Highway System; Main; Auxiliary; Suffixed; Business; Future
- New Jersey State Highway Routes; Interstate; US; State; Scenic Byways
- New York Highways; Interstate; US; State; Reference; Parkways
← Route 284	New Jersey	→ I-295
← NY 286	New York	→ NY 287

Interstate 287 (I-287) is an auxiliary Interstate Highway in the US states of New Jersey and New York. It is a partial beltway around New York City, serving northern New Jersey and the counties of Rockland and Westchester in New York. I-287, which is signed north–south in New Jersey and east–west in New York, follows a roughly horseshoe-shaped route from the New Jersey Turnpike (I-95) in Edison, New Jersey, clockwise to the New England Thruway (I-95) in Rye, New York, for 98.72 miles (158.87 km). Through New Jersey, I-287 runs west from its southern terminus in Edison through suburban areas. In Bridgewater Township, the freeway takes a more northeasterly course, paralleled by US Route 202 (US 202). The northernmost part of I-287 in New Jersey passes through mountainous surroundings. Upon entering New York at Suffern, I-287 turns east on the New York State Thruway (I-87) and runs through Rockland County. After crossing the Hudson River on the Tappan Zee Bridge, I-287 splits from I-87 near Tarrytown and continues east through Westchester County on the Cross Westchester Expressway until it reaches the New England Thruway. Within New Jersey, I-287 is maintained by the New Jersey Department of Transportation (NJDOT), and, within New York, it is maintained by the New York State Thruway Authority (NYSTA).

A bypass around New York City had been planned since the 1950s and would become a part of the Interstate Highway System and receive the I-287 designation. The Cross Westchester Expressway, which was originally designated as Interstate 187 (I-187), opened in 1960 as Interstate 487 (I-487) before becoming part of I-287 a year later. The New York State Thruway portion of I-287, which included a crossing of the Hudson River, opened in 1955. In New Jersey, the proposed I-287 had originally been designated as FAI Corridor 104 and incorporated what was planned as the Middlesex Freeway. The New Jersey section of I-287 between the New Jersey Turnpike in Edison and US 202 in Montville opened in stages between the 1960s and 1973; the remainder was completed by 1994. The aging Tappan Zee Bridge was replaced with a new span which opened in stages between 2017 and 2018.

A proposed tunnel across the Long Island Sound between Rye and Oyster Bay on Long Island would link the eastern terminus of I-287 to New York State Route 25 (NY 25) and NY 135 in Syosset.

== Route description ==
Lengths
	mi	km
NJ	67.54	108.70
NY	31.18	50.18
Total	98.72	158.87

=== New Jersey ===
==== Middlesex County ====
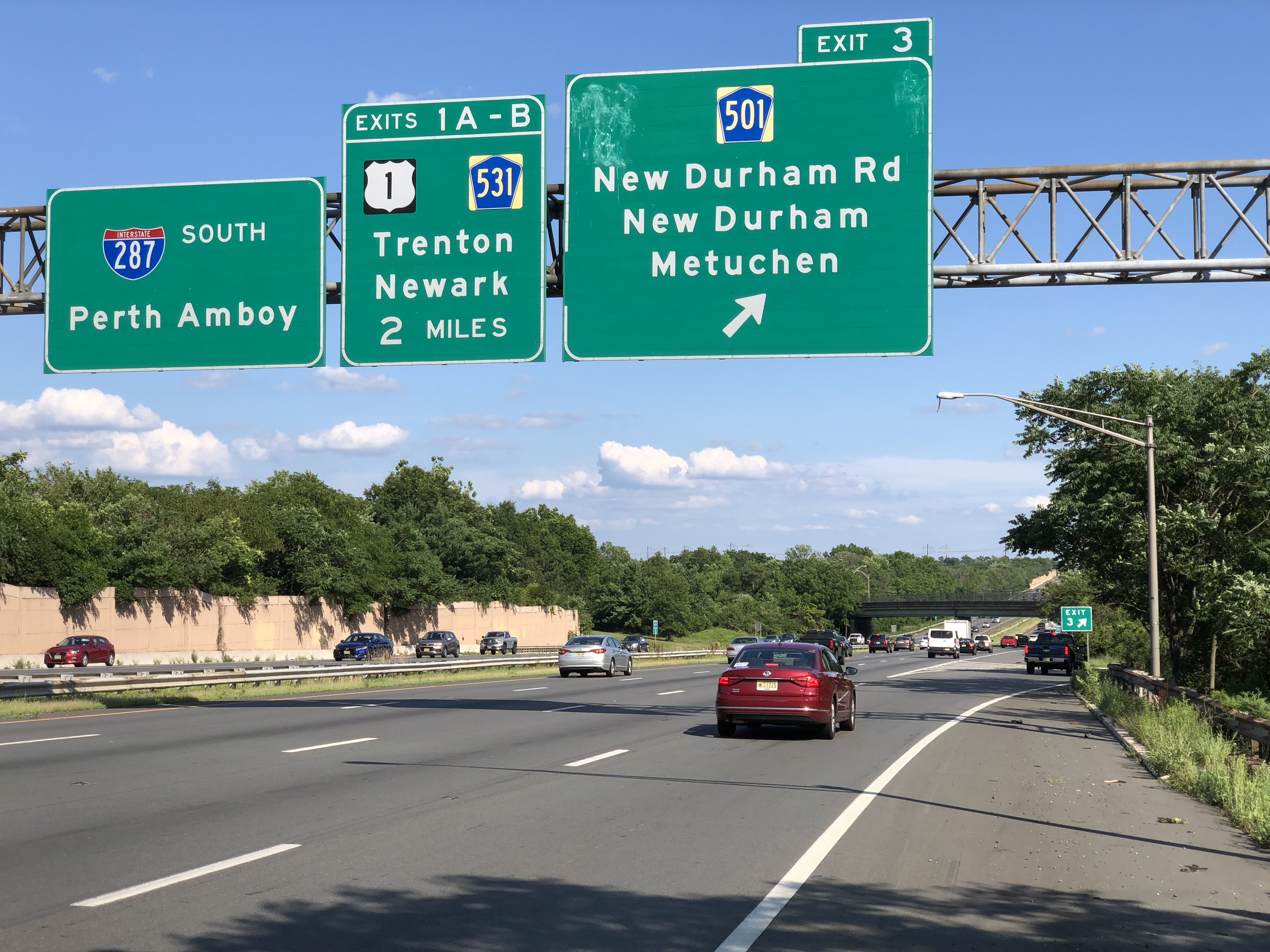
View south along I-287 at exit 3 (CR 501) in Edison

I-287 begins at an interchange with the New Jersey Turnpike (I-95) in Edison in Middlesex County, New Jersey, where the freeway continues east as Route 440 toward Perth Amboy and Staten Island. Within Middlesex County, I-287 is called the Lt. Col. (Ret) Richard F. Lauer, US Army Highway. From this point, it heads west as an eight-lane freeway through suburban areas, soon reaching an interchange with US 1 that also has access to County Route 531 (CR 531) in the southbound direction. Past this point, the road turns more to the northwest and passes under Conrail Shared Assets Operations's Bonhamtown Industrial Track line and a railroad spur before it comes to the junction with Route 27 (Lincoln Highway). Following Route 27, I-287 narrows to six lanes and passes over Amtrak's Northeast Corridor as it continues to a southbound exit and northbound entrance with CR 501.

As the freeway continues into South Plainfield, it passes near several business parks and comes to a partial interchange with Durham Avenue which only has a northbound exit and southbound entrance. At this point, the road starts to turn more west before it comes to a full junction with CR 529. Here, the road enters Piscataway and reaches an interchange with CR 665 (Washington Avenue). Continuing near more business parks, I-287 comes to the exit for South Randolphville Road. Following this interchange, the road heads west more before it turns to the southwest and comes to an interchange with the northern terminus of Route 18. After Route 18, the freeway comes to the CR 622 (River Road) exit.

==== Somerset County ====
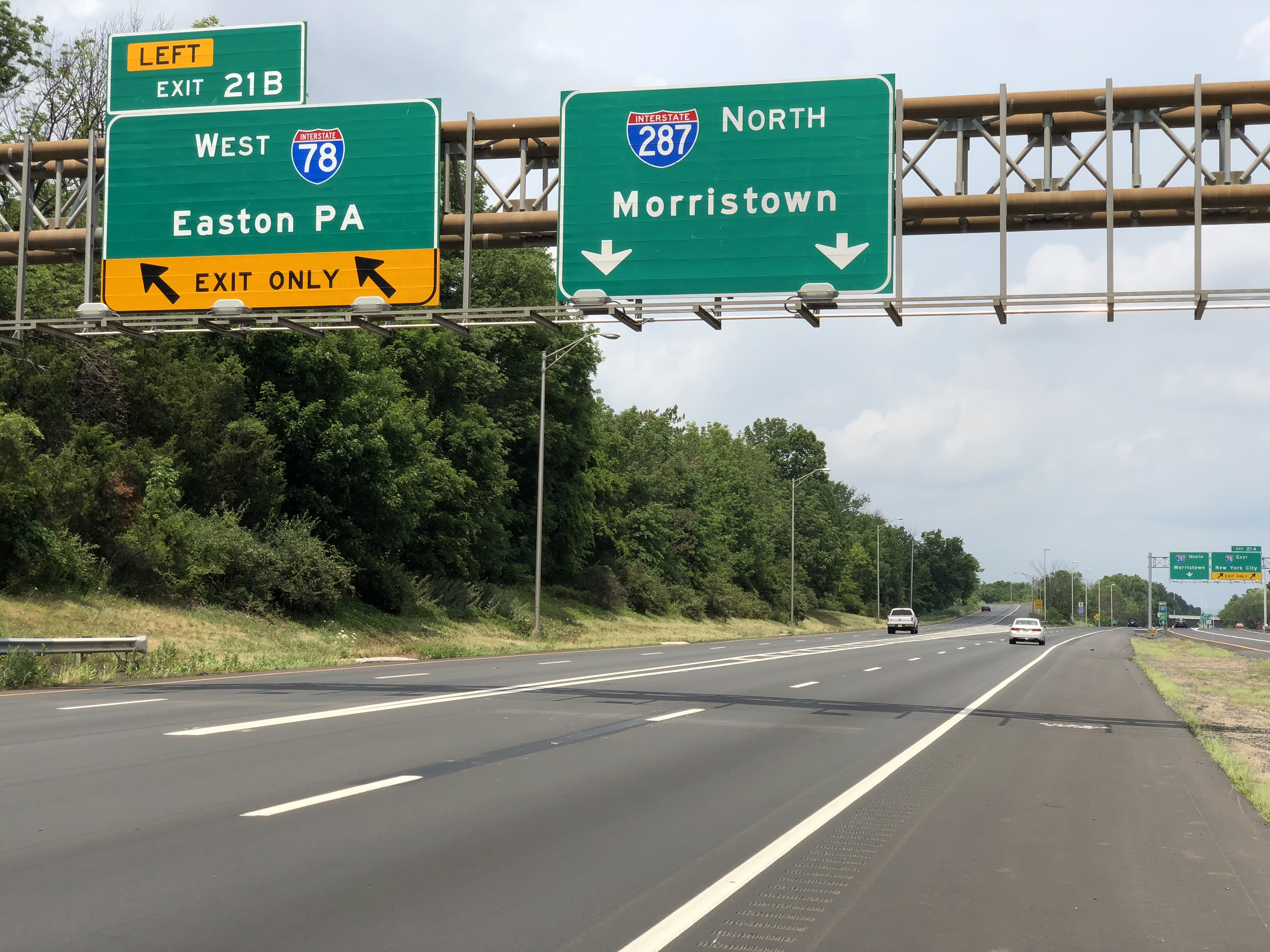
I-287 northbound at I-78 in Bedminster

After crossing over the Raritan River, I-287 enters Franklin Township, Somerset County, and becomes the Captain (Ret) Joseph Azzolina, US Navy Highway. Soon after the river, there is an interchange with CR 527. After CR 527, the freeway makes a turn to the northwest and passes a mix of residential areas and business parks. The road has an interchange with CR 623 (Weston Canal Road) before crossing the Raritan River again and continuing into Bridgewater Township. Within Bridgewater Township, I-287 curves north-northwest and passes over Conrail Shared Assets Operations's Lehigh Line and then both NJ Transit's Raritan Valley Line and CR 533 near TD Bank Ballpark, which is home to the Somerset Patriots baseball team. Past this area, the road encounters Route 28 at an interchange. Past Route 28, the freeway turns northwest and passes over Norfolk Southern Railway's Middle Brook Industrial Track line before it intersects US 22 at a partial interchange with a northbound exit and entrance and southbound entrance. From this point, I-287 makes a turn to the west and runs to the north of US 22 as it has a wide median. The freeway turns northwest as it passes near the Bridgewater Commons shopping mall and reaches a partial interchange with US 202/US 206. Through the remainder of New Jersey, US 202 parallels the course of I-287. At this point, I-287 gains a local–express lane configuration, with three local and two express lanes southbound and three express and three local lanes northbound. Both the southbound local and express lanes have access to southbound US 202/US 206 at this interchange, whereas northbound US 202/US 206 only has access to the local lanes of northbound I-287.

From here, the road continues north past suburban residential areas, with the northbound direction narrowing to two local lanes, before entering Bedminster. Here, I-287 intersects I-78 at the Vincent R. Kramer Interchange, where the local–express lane configuration ends. Access from eastbound I-78 to southbound I-287 is only to the local lanes. Meanwhile, the express lanes of northbound I-287 provides access to westbound I-78 while the local lanes provide access to eastbound I-78. Following I-78, I-287 heads north with four northbound lanes and three southbound lanes into more wooded surroundings, reaching another interchange with US 202/US 206. At this point, the freeway median widens again as it turns northeast before continuing more to the east and entering Far Hills. Within Far Hills, the road passes under CR 512 before the northbound direction narrows to three lanes and the wide median ends. Entering Bernards Township, I-287 runs east-northeast to an interchange with CR 525. After the CR 525 interchange, the road gains a wide median that narrows again before the road runs under NJ Transit's Gladstone Branch, heading more to the northeast. Before leaving Bernards Township, there is an exit for North Maple Avenue.

==== Morris County ====
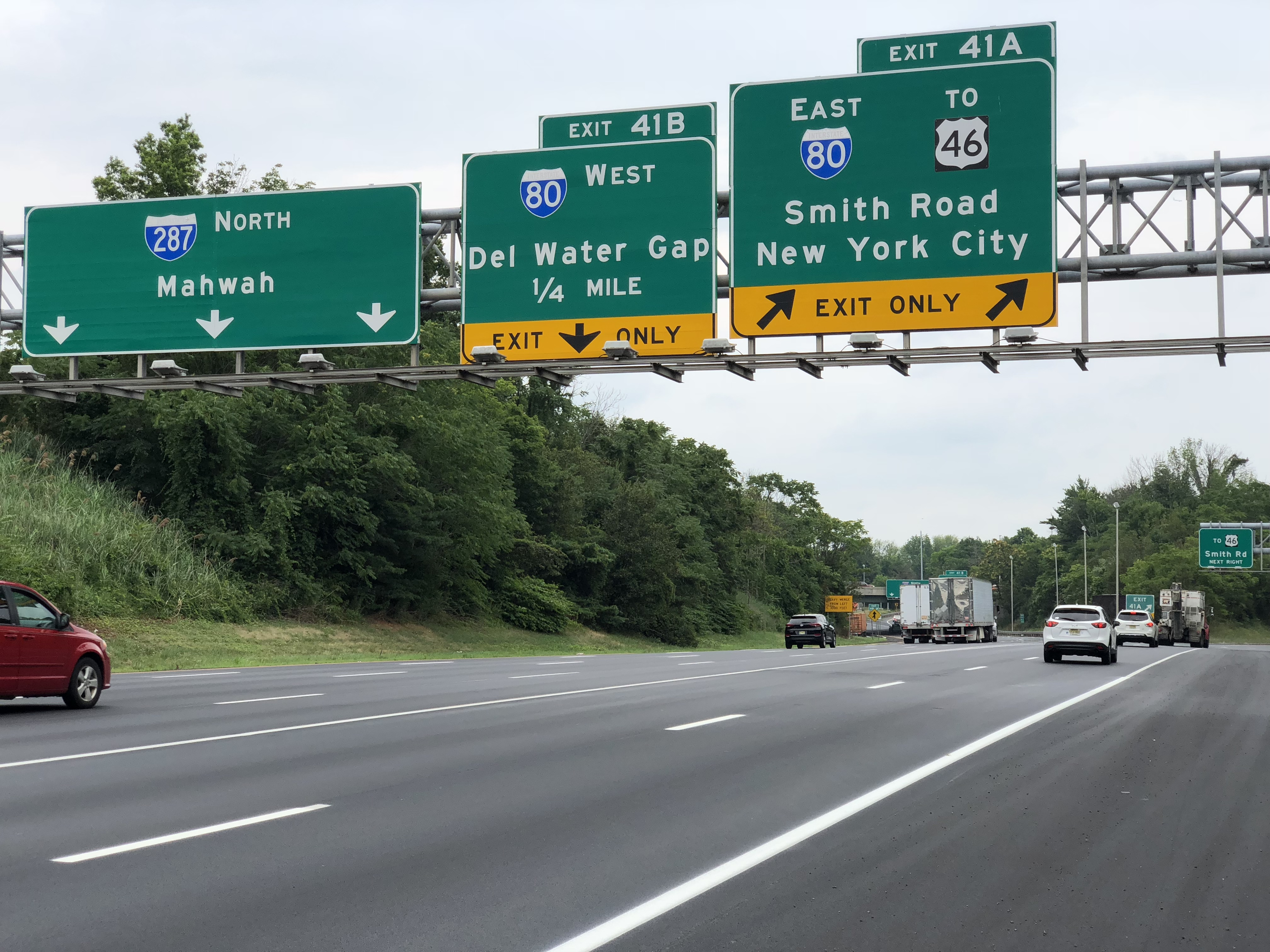
I-287 northbound approaching I-80 in Parsippany–Troy Hills

A short distance after this interchange, I-287 enters Harding Township, Morris County, at the crossing of the Passaic River, where it becomes the Marine Hector Cafferata Jr. Cong. Medal of Honor Highway. It continues northeast, with US 202 running a short distance to the west. The freeway makes a turn more to the east as it comes to a truck-only rest area in the northbound direction. The road crosses into Morris Township, where it reaches an exit-only interchange with Harter Road; there are no entrances present. Shortly after Harter Road, there is a junction with CR 663 (James Street) that only has entrances to I-287. After this, I-287 turns north and enters Morristown, where the southbound direction gains a fourth lane as the median narrows. The freeway enters more developed areas as it comes to the Route 124 interchange. From this point, the road becomes eight lanes total, with four in each direction, as it passes west of Morristown Medical Center. After crossing under NJ Transit's Morristown Line, it reaches the exit for CR 510. From CR 510, I-287 makes a turn to the northeast, crossing back into Morris Township before continuing into Hanover Township. Here, the route comes to the western terminus of the Route 24 freeway and becomes ten lanes total. Following Route 24, the freeway passes over the Morristown and Erie Railway's Whippany Line before it intersects Route 10 and becomes nine lanes, with five southbound and four northbound. I-287 passes near several business parks as it enters Parsippany–Troy Hills. In this area, there is an interchange with CR 511 east of Lake Parsippany that also has access to Entin Road in the southbound direction. After this, I-287 widens to eleven lanes with five northbound lanes, two express southbound lanes, and four local southbound lanes as it comes to the I-80 junction.

Following this interchange, the freeway becomes six lanes, with three in each direction as it continues into more wooded areas and reaching an exit with access to US 46 and US 202/CR 511. In this area, the highway runs to the west of the Boonton Reservoir and immediately to the east of US 202/CR 511. I-287 comes to the Intervale Road exit, which carries US 202 and CR 511. The freeway enters Boonton, where it turns northeast, with NJ Transit's Montclair-Boonton Line located a short distance to the northwest. In Boonton, there is another interchange with US 202/CR 511. From here, I-287 curves more to the east, with US 202 running immediately to the north of the road. Along this stretch, there is an exit for US 202 and Vreeland Avenue. Upon entering Montville, the passes near wooded residential areas before coming to another interchange with US 202. I-287 continues northeast from this point, drawing away from US 202, crossing under NJ Transit's Montclair-Boonton Line before running north-northeast through more woodland as the terrain starts to get more mountainous. This stretch of I-287 continues for six miles (9.7 km) before its next exit. The freeway runs through Kinnelon, where the northbound direction has four lanes, and Pequannock Township before entering Riverdale. In Riverdale, there is an interchange with Route 23. A short distance later, I-287 reaches the CR 694 interchange which provides access to CR 511 Alternate (CR 511 Alt.).

==== Passaic and Bergen counties ====
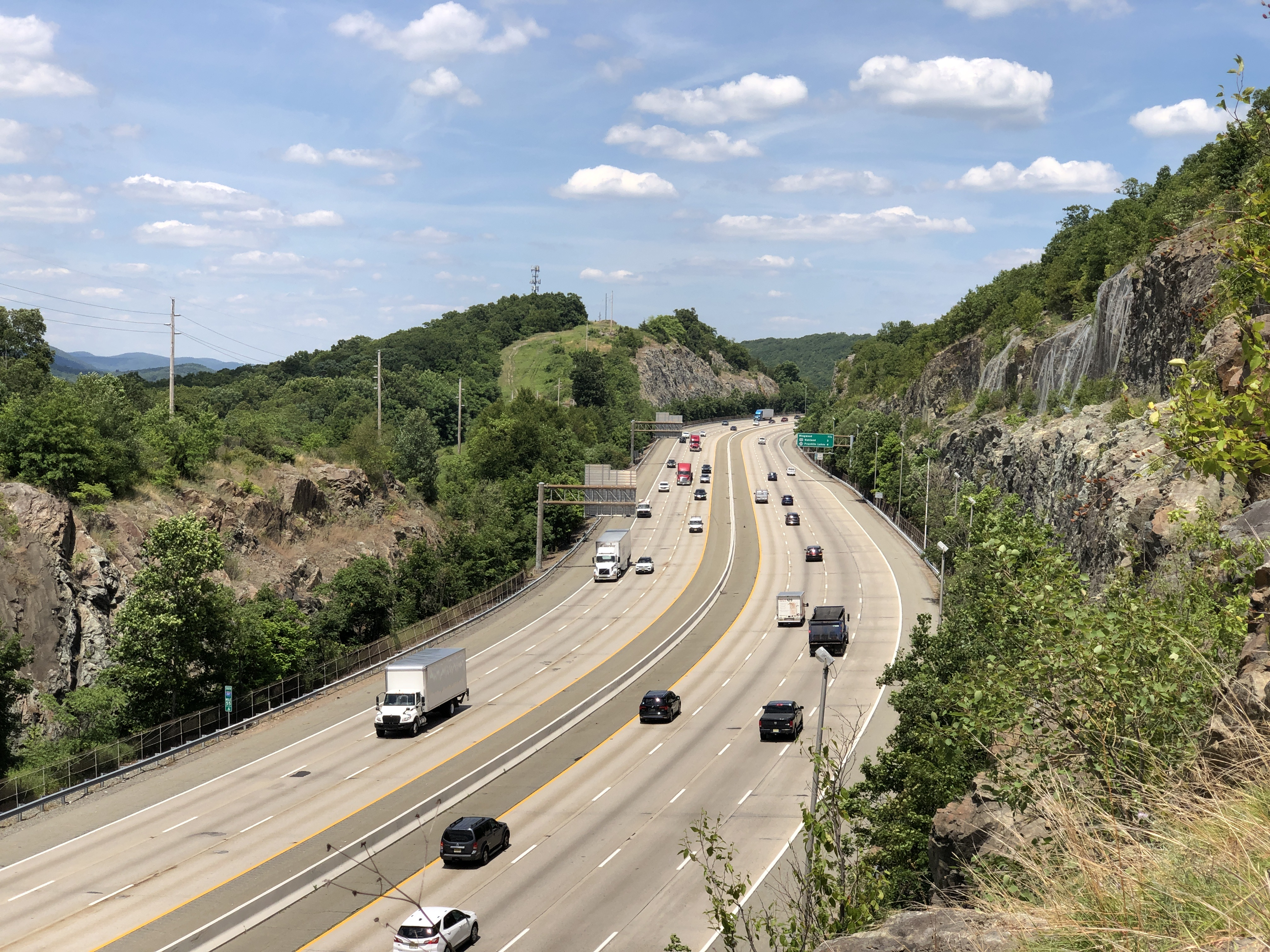
I-287 passing through rock cuts in Wanaque

Immediately after this, I-287 crosses over the Pequannock River and New York, Susquehanna and Western Railway's New Jersey Subdivision line into Bloomingdale, Passaic County, where the highway becomes US Air Force Gunner Clarence "Red" Mosley Highway. The road continues northeast and turns north as it briefly passes through Pompton Lakes before crossing into Wanaque. Here, the road makes a turn northeast again as it comes to the CR 511 Alternate interchange. After this, I-287 passes through rock cuts in the Ramapo Mountains before making a sharp turn east as it crosses high above the Wanaque River valley on a bridge. The freeway continues into Oakland, Bergen County, where the name becomes Army Staff Sergeant Walter Bray Highway.

Here, there are a couple of businesses near the road before the interchange with Skyline Drive. Following this, the road crosses the Ramapo River before passing near neighborhoods and reaching a junction with US 202. After US 202, I-287 turns southeast and closely parallels the New York, Susquehanna and Western Railway line to the southwest before coming to an interchange with the northern terminus of Route 208 at the Franklin Lakes borough line. Past this interchange, I-287 narrows to four lanes and turns northeast as the railroad line draws away. The freeway passes wooded residential neighborhoods prior to turning north and entering Mahwah, where it continues near more wooded suburban areas as well as the Campgaw Mountain Reservation to the west of the road. After passing to the east of the Ramapo College campus, I-287 passes over US 202. The freeway crosses the Ramapo River again before reaching an interchange with Route 17. At this point, Route 17 forms a concurrency with I-287 and the road widens to six lanes as it passes between the Ramapo Valley County Reservation to the west and business parks to the east.

=== New York ===
==== New York State Thruway ====
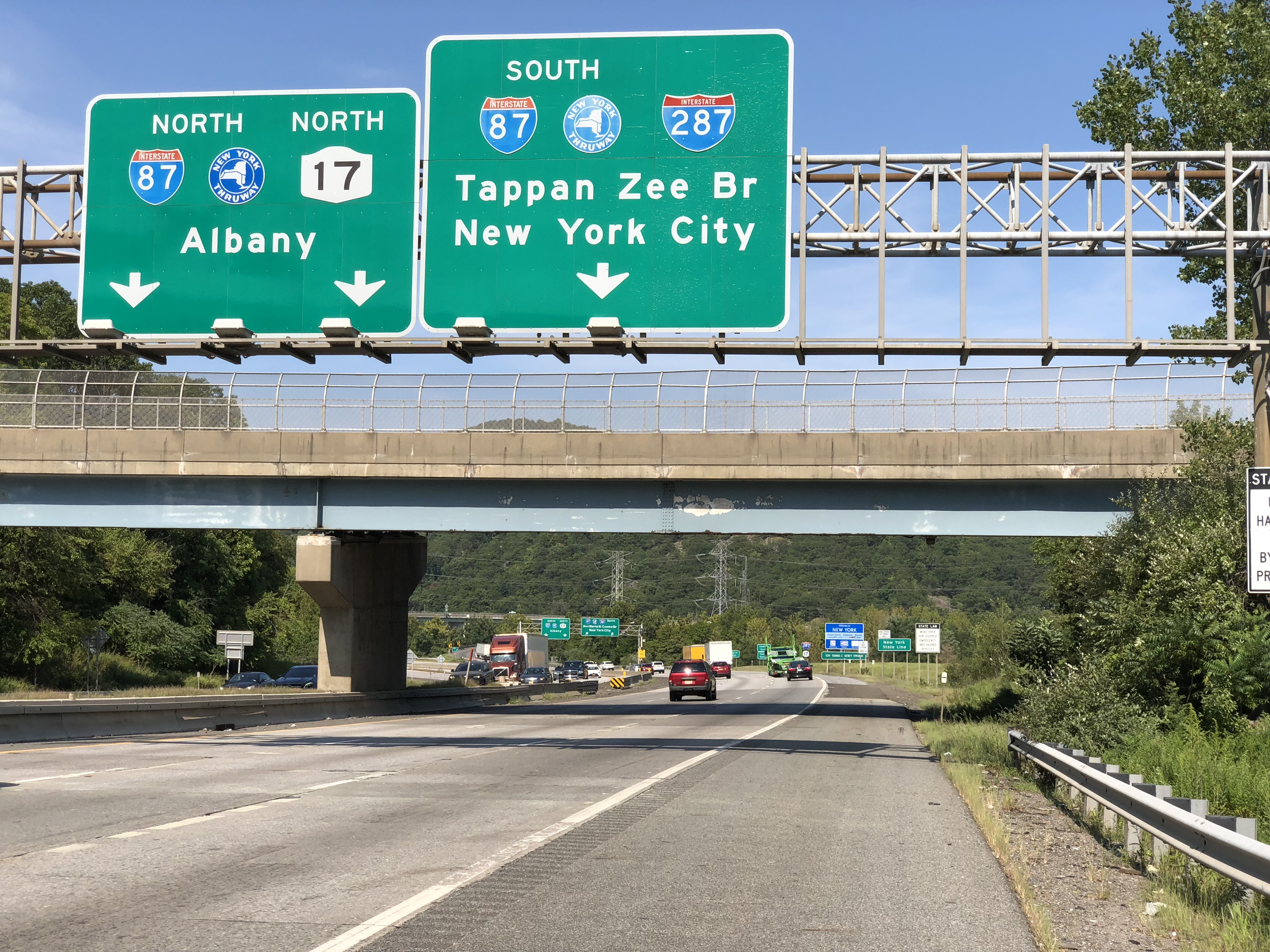
I-287/Route 17 crossing into New York just south of the New York State Thruway

Upon entering New York in the village of Hillburn in the town of Ramapo in Rockland County, New York, New Jersey's Route 17 ends and NY 17 follows I-287 as the road comes to an interchange with the New York State Thruway (I-87). At this point, NY 17 splits north onto I-87 and I-287 joins I-87 on the eight-lane New York State Thruway, passing over Metro-North Railroad's Port Jervis Line as it heads east out of the mountains into suburban residential and commercial surroundings as it narrows to six lanes. After passing through the village of Montebello, the freeway reaches an interchange with Airmont Road where it becomes the border between Montebello to the north and the village of Airmont to the south. Continuing to the east, the New York State Thruway becomes the border between Monsey and Airmont before separating Monsey from the village of Chestnut Ridge to the south as it turns slightly to the east-southeast. After briefly running along the south edge of the village of Spring Valley, where there is a westbound toll gantry for trucks, the highway fully enters Chestnut Ridge. In this area, it comes to the Thruway's Garden State Parkway Connector, which heads south to New Jersey and becomes the Garden State Parkway. Following this junction, I-87/I-287 continues east into the town of Clarkstown, coming to an exit for NY 59. After this, the road passes to the north of Nanuet, crossing under NJ Transit/Metro-North Railroad's Pascack Valley Line. The freeway crosses under NY 304 before the cloverleaf interchange with the Palisades Interstate Parkway. As the Thruway continues into West Nyack, it passes under CSX Transportation's River Subdivision line before coming to the exit for NY 303 that provides access to the Palisades Center shopping mall to the south of the road.

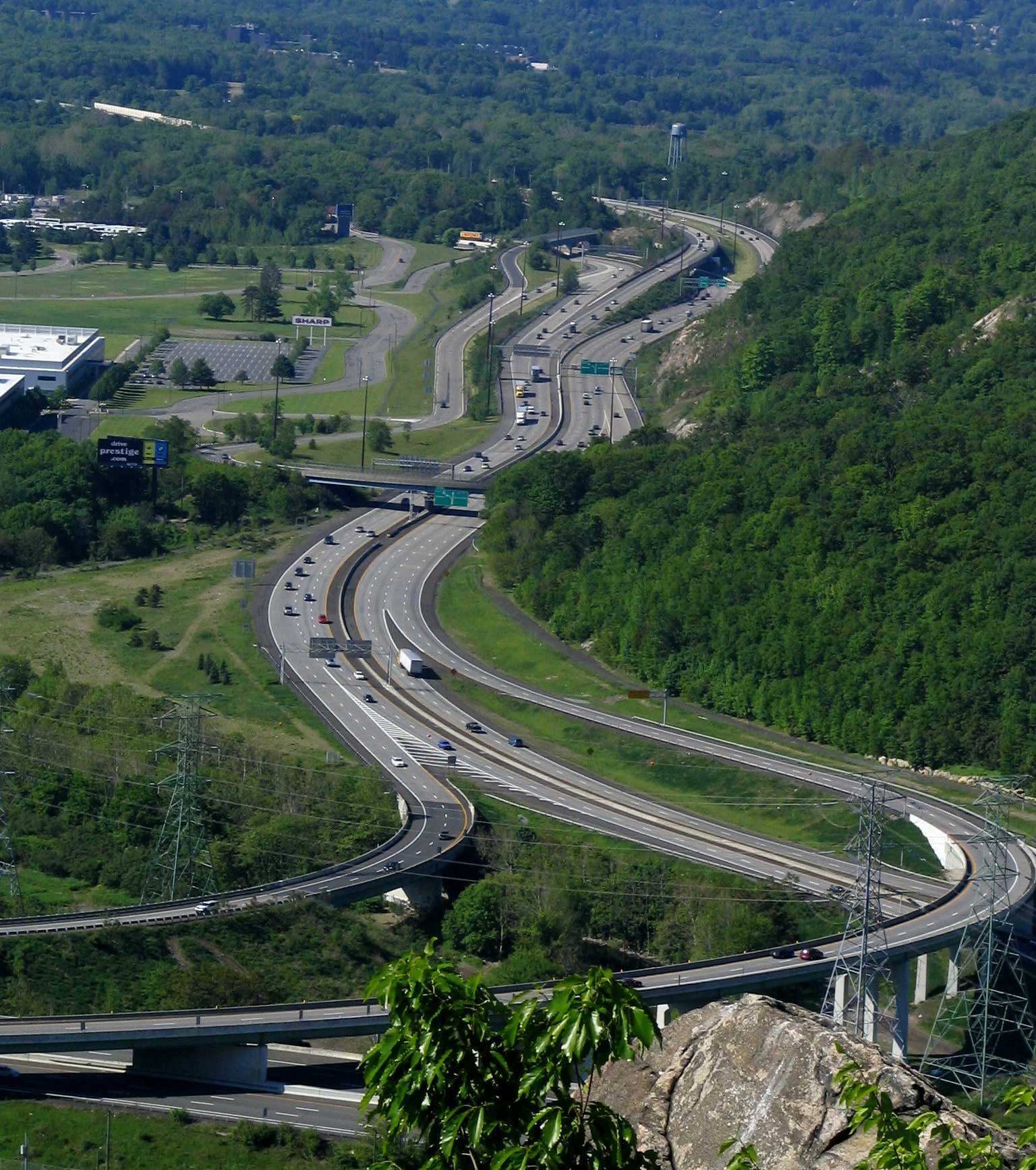
I-287 interchanges with I-87 in Suffern and Hillburn, New York (foreground) and New Jersey Route 17 in Mahwah, New Jersey (background). The border between New York and New Jersey is about halfway up the photo.

Past NY 303, I-87/I-287 turns to the east-southeast and passes near wooded areas as well as suburban neighborhoods of Central Nyack. It comes to another interchange with NY 59 that also provides access to US 9W. Within this interchange, the roadway has an eastbound toll gantry for the Tappan Zee Bridge that allows tolls to be collected at highway speeds using E-ZPass or toll by mail. At this point, the New York State Thruway widens to eight lanes and turns to the south-southeast into the village of Nyack in the town of Orangetown, crossing over US 9W prior to passing near residential areas in the village of South Nyack as it runs to the east of US 9W, descending into the Palisades. The last interchange in Rockland County is with US 9W and has no southbound exit. From here, the New York State Thruway crosses the Hudson River on the Tappan Zee Bridge east into the village of Tarrytown in the town of Greenburgh in Westchester County. After passing over the river, the road crosses over Metro-North Railroad's Hudson Line. After this, the freeway comes to the exit for US 9 that also serves the western terminus of NY 119. I-87/I-287 continues east past woodland and business parks, leaving Tarrytown. The two routes then split; I-87 continues south on the New York State Thruway, while I-287 heads east on the Cross Westchester Expressway. This interchange also has access to and from the northbound Saw Mill River Parkway and NY 119.

==== Cross Westchester Expressway ====
The Cross Westchester Expressway, which is maintained by the NYSTA, is six lanes wide and carries I-287 east to a westbound exit for NY 119 that is intertwined with the ramps between the New York State Thruway and NY 119/Saw Mill River Parkway. After passing over the Saw Mill River Parkway and the Saw Mill River, the road enters the village of Elmsford and runs through developed areas as it has a partial diamond interchange with NY 9A that does not have an eastbound exit. The Cross Westchester Expressway turns southeast from this point and intersects the Sprain Brook Parkway. I-287 widens to eight lanes at this junction and continues to the exit for NY 100A. After the NY 100A interchange, the freeway leaves Elmsford and turns to the east near residential areas, narrowing to six lanes before coming to an exit for NY 100 and NY 119 that also has access to the Bronx River Parkway.

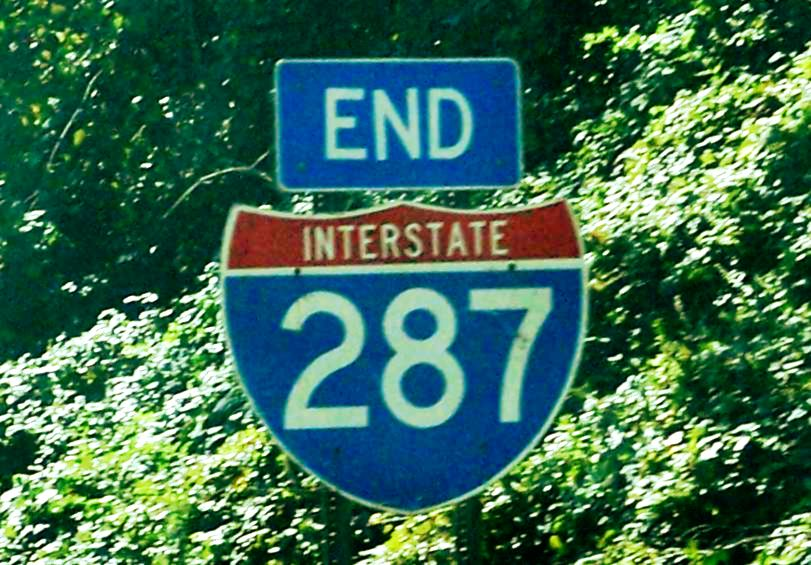
I-287 sign at the end of the route at the I-287/I-95 intersection in Rye, New York

Following this exit, the road becomes eight lanes again and crosses over the Bronx River Parkway, the Bronx River, and Metro-North Railroad's Harlem Line. Here, the road crosses into White Plains and reaches an interchange with NY 22. Past NY 22, I-287 makes a sharp curve to the south as it narrows to six lanes and runs near inhabited neighborhoods. The road has a westbound exit and eastbound entrance with the Central Westchester Parkway, a road that provides access to the Taconic State Parkway by way of NY 22. The freeway runs past commercial areas to the east of downtown White Plains as it encounters Westchester Avenue, which connects to The Westchester shopping mall in the downtown area. Within this interchange, the Cross Westchester Expressway turns east along the border between Harrison to the north and White Plains to the south. Westchester Avenue becomes a frontage road for I-287 as the road passes corporate parks to the north and populated neighborhoods to the south.

The road begins to turn southeast as it comes to a directional interchange with the southern terminus of I-684. The I-287 freeway heads south along the White Plains–Harrison border before turning east and fully entering Harrison, where there is a cloverleaf interchange with the Hutchinson River Parkway. At this interchange, the Westchester Avenue frontage road serves as a collector–distributor road. The Cross Westchester Expressway turns southeast again past wooded areas of development, with NY 120 coming onto the Westchester Avenue frontage road. I-287 reaches an interchange where the frontage road ends as Westchester Avenue heads east as NY 120A and NY 120 continues to the south. Here, the freeway enters the village of Rye Brook in the town of Rye as it continues southeast. The Cross Westchester Expressway comes into the village of Port Chester, where the road runs near more dense suburban development as it intersects US 1. At this point, the road has ramp access to and from the southbound direction of the New England Thruway (I-95). From here, the mainline I-287 narrows to four lanes and enters the city of Rye, where it passes over the Northeast Corridor before merging into northbound I-95 about a half-mile (0.80 km) west of the Connecticut state line.

== History ==
=== New Jersey ===
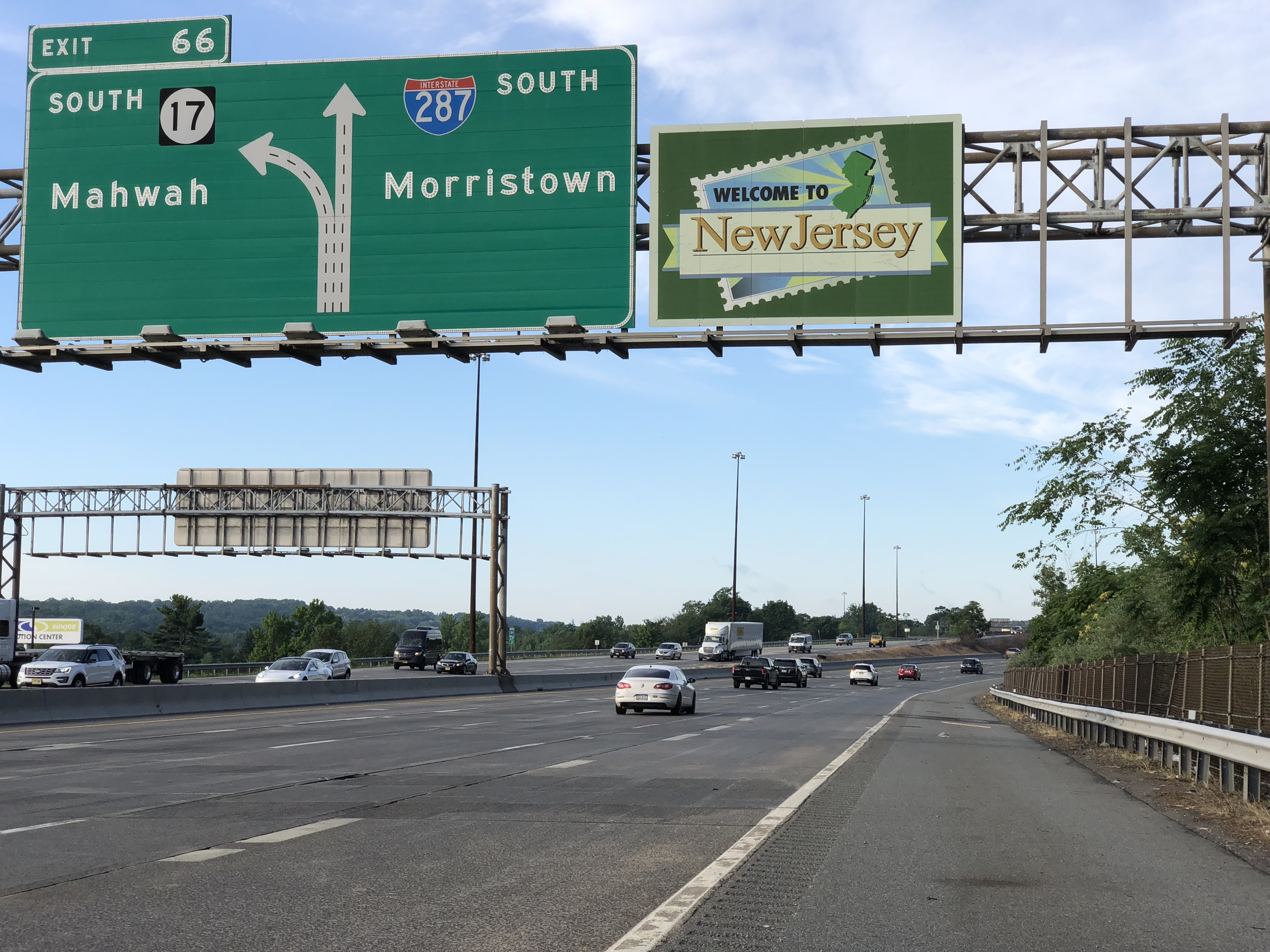
New Jersey state line along I-287 south

In the 1950s, a limited-access highway was proposed to bypass New York City. This planned beltway would be incorporated into the new Interstate Highway System. The proposed beltway in New Jersey was designated as FAI Corridor 104 and later received the I-287 designation in 1958. The southern segment of I-287 was planned in the 1950s as the Middlesex Freeway, which was to run from the Outerbridge Crossing to Staten Island and follow the Route 440 corridor to Edison, where it would connect to the New Jersey Turnpike before continuing west to I-78. From here, the freeway would parallel US 202 north to the New York border. The anticipated cost of building I-287 in New Jersey was $235 million (equivalent to $2.2 billion in 2025). The southernmost part of I-287 in Middlesex County was intended to be signed as part of I-95 instead; this never happened due to the cancellation of the Somerset Freeway. By the mid-1960s, I-287 had been completed between the New Jersey Turnpike and Bedminster and from US 46 in Parsippany to US 202 in Montville. More of I-287 in New Jersey had been finished by 1969, with the sections from US 46 south to Route 10 in Hanover Township and from Bedminster north to Maple Avenue in Bernards Township opened. The segment of the highway between Maple Avenue and Route 24 opened in 1973, followed by the segment between Route 24 and Route 10 in early 1975, making I-287 a continuous road between the New Jersey Turnpike in Edison and US 202 in Montville.

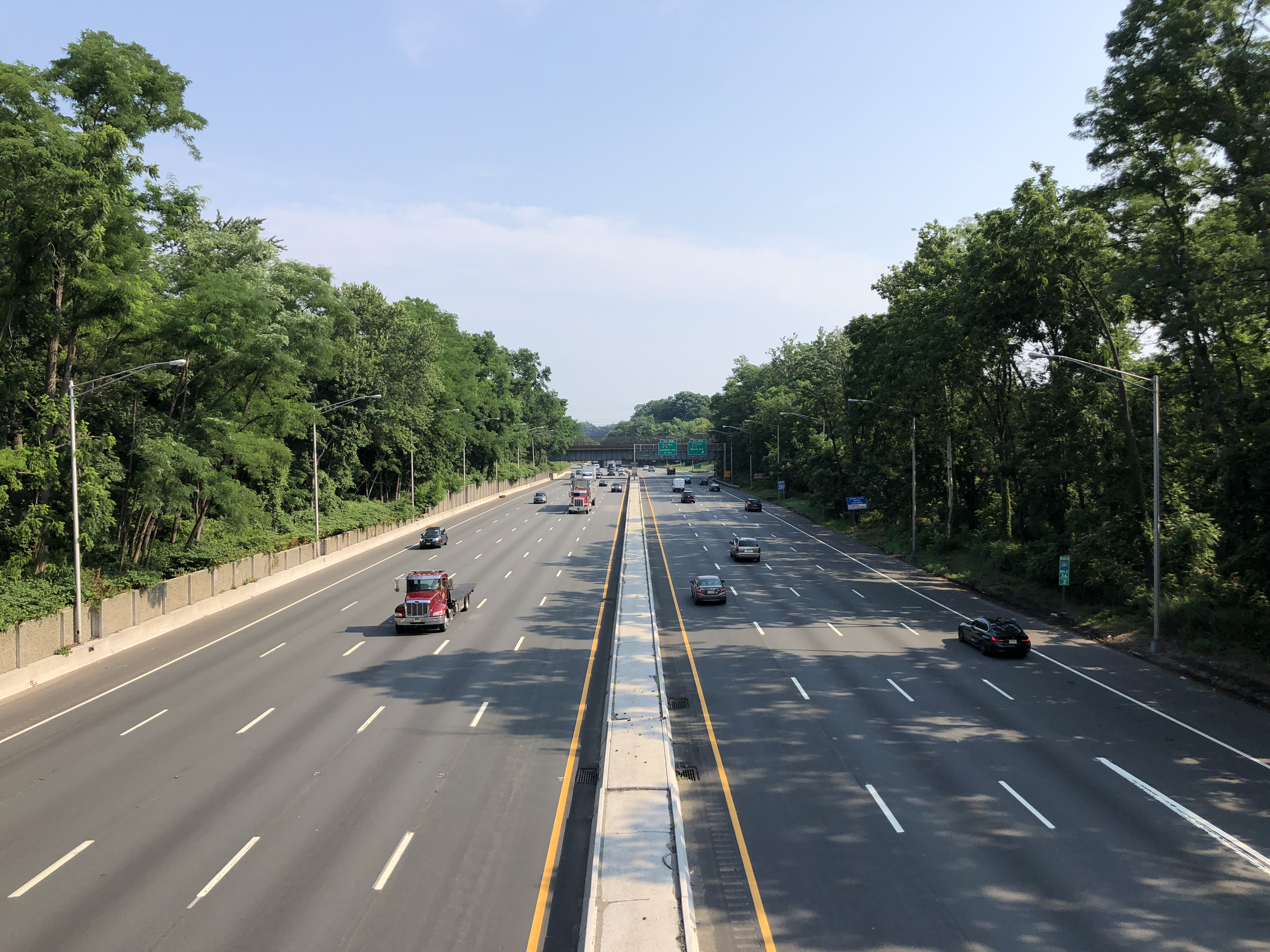
I-287 northbound in Morristown

I-287's missing section between US 202 in Montville and the New York State Thruway in Suffern, New York, was controversial dating back to 1965 and continuing until its opening in 1993. Property owners along the proposed route fought its completion as part of the freeway revolts of the 1960s and 1970s. Originally, I-287 was proposed to take a more eastern route through the Lincoln Park and Wayne areas; this routing gained opposition as it passed through populated areas. A more western alignment was planned through mountainous areas in 1973, but this was rejected as the cost of building the road through the mountains was too high. In 1977, the current alignment of I-287 was proposed between Montville and Suffern; this was approved by the federal government in 1982 as it was less costly than the western alignment and went through less developed areas than the eastern alignment.

Permits allowing construction to begin on this segment were issued in 1988 by the US Army Corps of Engineers. Officials in Rockland County, New York filed a lawsuit on November 19, 1993, hours before the highway's official ribbon-cutting, seeking to block its opening. They claimed the incomplete interchange with the New York State Thruway was inadequate to handle the additional traffic. That interchange was not complete until 1994, but the highway opened as planned on November 19 in a ceremony held on the Wanaque River bridge, where New Jersey Governor James Florio cut the ribbon. This moment marked the completion of a bypass around New York City that had been planned for decades. The portion of I-287 between the US 202 interchange in Oakland and the Route 208 interchange in Franklin Lakes overtook the westernmost portion of Route 208, truncating that route to its current location.

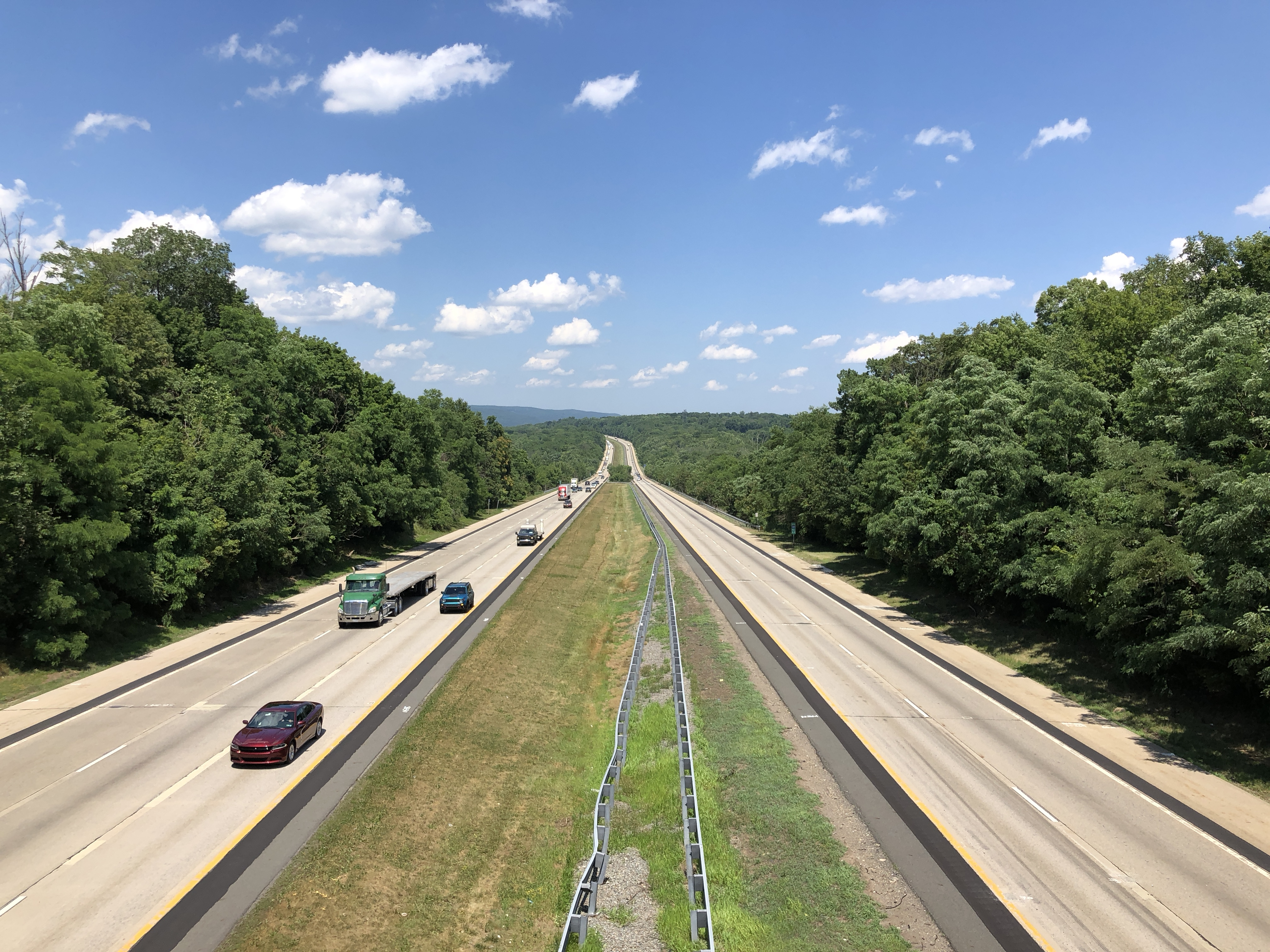
I-287 northbound in Mahwah Township

The completion of I-287 in New Jersey had significant effects on traffic and development patterns in the area. Several towns along the highway, such as Wanaque and Montville, saw increases in development. In addition, as the road was a bypass, it saw a significant increase in truck traffic wishing to bypass congested roads closer to New York City. The road also increased truck traffic on other north–south corridors, such as Route 31, from truckers wanting to bypass the New Jersey Turnpike by using these surface roads to get between the I-287 bypass of New York City and I-95 south to Pennsylvania. On July 16, 1999, Governor Christine Todd Whitman banned oversize trucks from using roads that are not part of the National Highway System, such as Route 31. Trucks were therefore forced to use I-287 and the New Jersey Turnpike to travel across the state. In the 1990s, high-occupancy vehicle lanes (HOV lanes) were built along I-287 between Bedminster and Parsippany. These HOV lanes, along with the ones that had been built on I-80, were opened to all traffic in 1998 due to lack of HOV usage, and the state did not have to repay the federal government the $240 million (equivalent to $442 million in 2025) to build the lanes. In 2011, a small section of the northbound side of the highway in Boonton collapsed into the Rockaway River due to Hurricane Irene. Near the end of that year, five people and a dog were killed when a small SOCATA TBM 700 airplane en route to Georgia crashed on the highway near exit 33 in Morris Township.

In August 2007, NJDOT started the I-287 (Middlesex Freeway) Rehabilitation Project to resurface the pavement between exit 5 in South Plainfield and I-95/New Jersey Turnpike in Edison Township, which is used by about 150,000 vehicles daily. Some of the bridges and overpasses had deteriorated to such a state that they needed to be replaced. On September 16, 2009, NJDOT announced the start of another rehabilitation and repaving project from exit 5 in Piscataway to the area of exit 10 in Franklin Township. This project, which was funded by the American Recovery and Reinvestment Act of 2009, cost $29 million (equivalent to $42.2 million in 2025) and was finished by April 2011.

On March 21, 2025 a sinkhole opened up on the northbound shoulder at shortly after 4PM. The collapse resulted in the closure of two lanes on the roadway. Referring to maps, there are no mines in the area of the collapse. The sinkhole is not related to the mine collapses on I80.

=== New York State Thruway ===
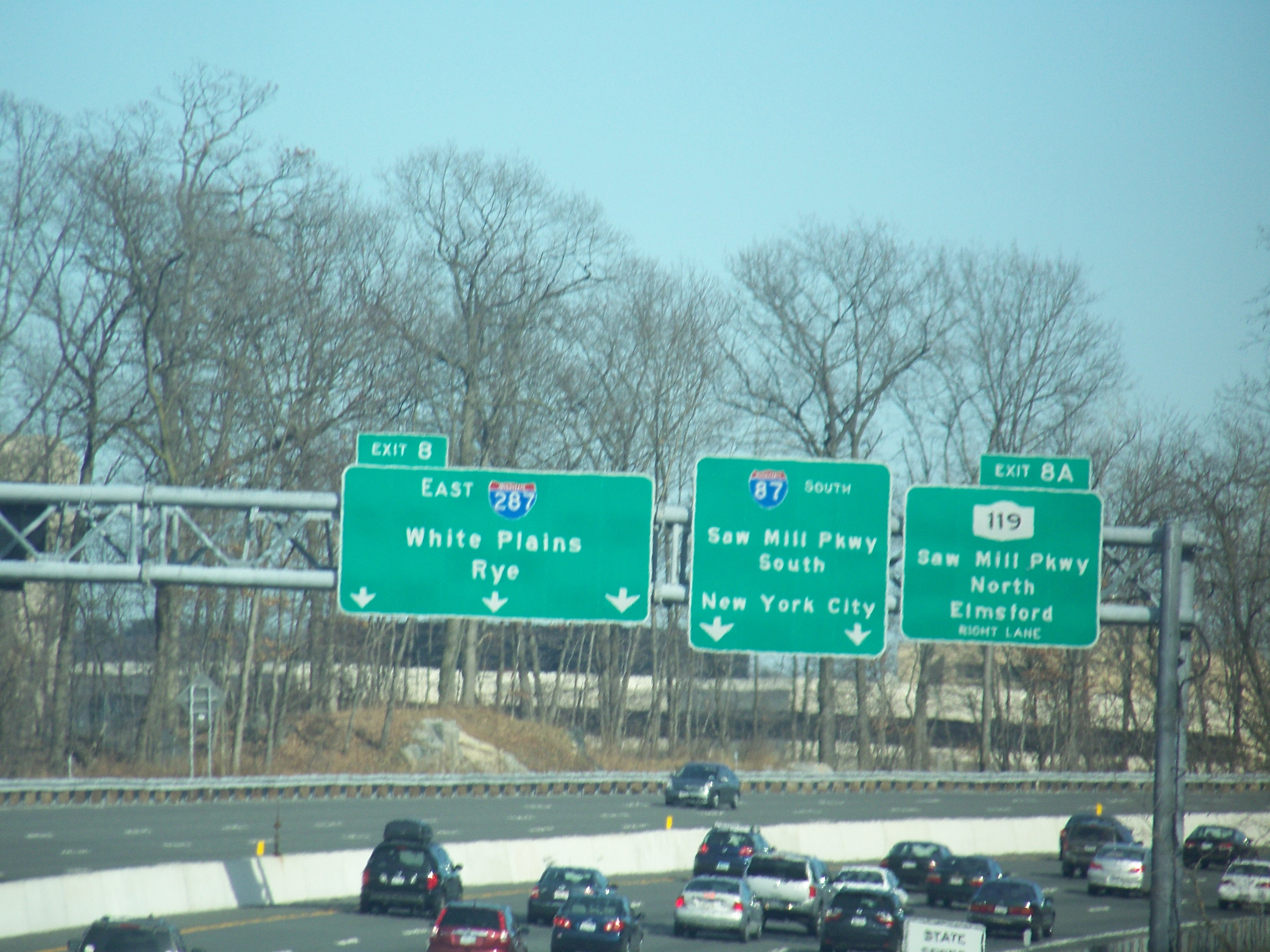
I-287 eastbound approaching the split with I-87 near Tarrytown

The New York State Thruway portion of I-287 was planned around 1950 as part of a tolled limited-access highway that was to connect the major cities of New York. A bridge across the Hudson River was planned between Nyack and Tarrytown at a site that was close enough to New York City but far enough from the Port Authority of New York and New Jersey's jurisdiction area, as they opposed the crossing. The portion of the Thruway currently followed by I-287, including the Tappan Zee Bridge over the Hudson River, opened on December 15, 1955. In the 1960s, I-287 was designated along the New York State Thruway between Suffern and Tarrytown, while I-87 ran farther to the east on present-day I-684. On January 1, 1970, the I-87 designation was shifted onto this portion of the New York State Thruway to run concurrent with I-287.

The E-ZPass electronic toll collection system was first introduced on this segment of the Thruway at the Spring Valley and Tappan Zee Bridge toll plazas in 1993. The same year, an interchange in Suffern opened providing access to the newly opened New Jersey portion of I-287. In 1997, tolls for cars were eliminated at the Spring Valley toll plaza, with tolls remaining for trucks and other commercial vehicles. The I-87/I-287 interchange split near Tarrytown began a $187-million (equivalent to $324 million in 2025) reconstruction in 2001 in order to add additional lanes and rebuild overpasses and underpasses. Reconstruction in this area was completed in May 2004. In 2016, the Tappan Zee Bridge toll plaza was demolished and replaced with an electronic toll gantry on the west side. The Spring Valley toll plaza went all-electronic in 2018.

=== Cross Westchester Expressway ===
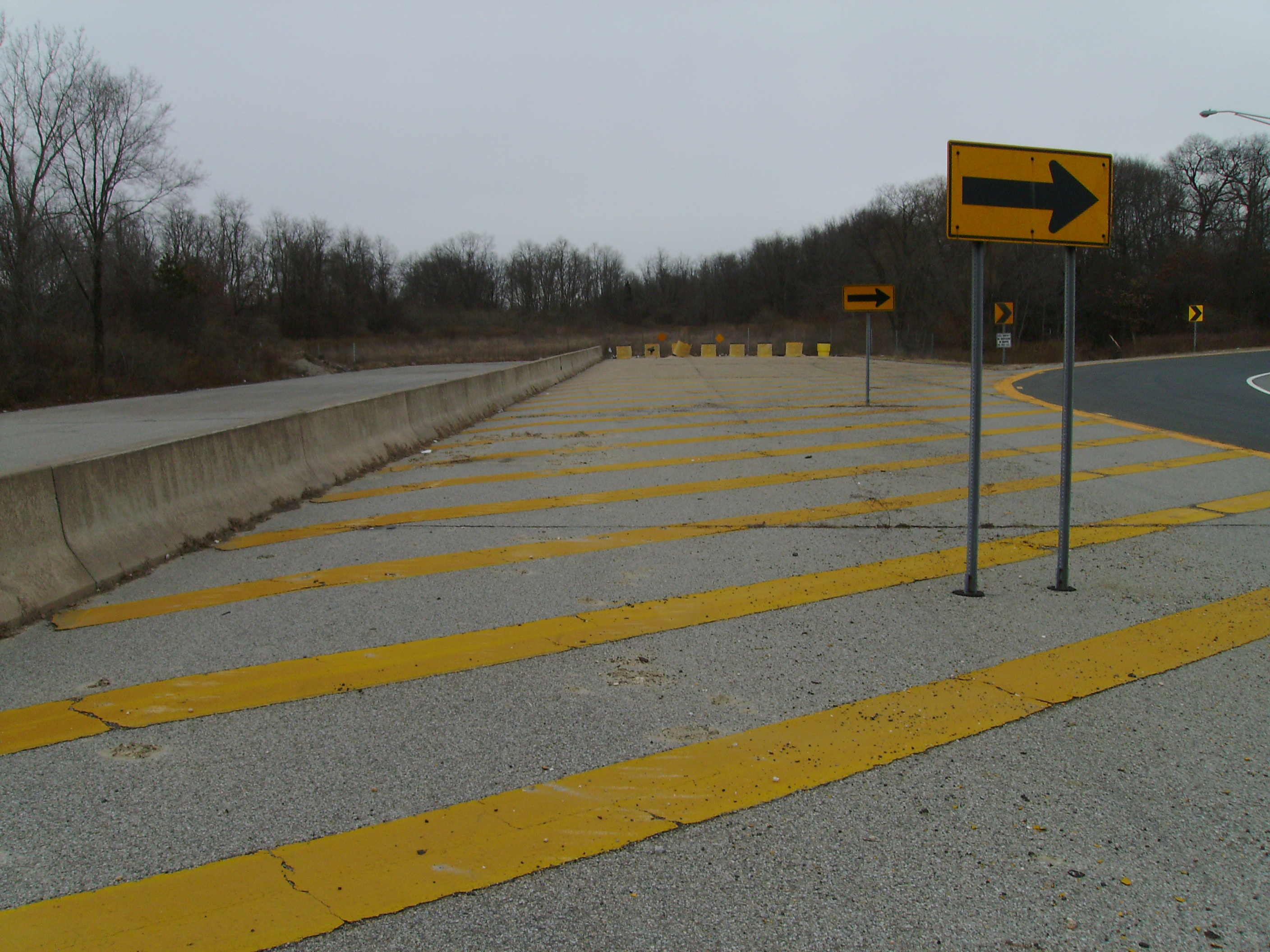
The stub north end of NY 135 in Syosset, where a freeway was to continue to a crossing of the Long Island Sound to Rye that would connect to I-287

Plans for a limited-access road to cross Westchester County east to west date back to the 1920s and became more needed after post-World War II traffic increases. When the Tappan Zee Bridge was proposed around 1950, the Cross Westchester Expressway was becoming a more realistic idea. Construction of the freeway began in 1956, and was given the NY 119 designation. The design of the highway met Interstate Highway standards after opening and was supposed to have the I-187 designation. However, by the time the highway opened in 1960, it was officially designated as I-487 instead. At a cost of $50 million (equivalent to $416 million in 2025), the Cross Westchester Expressway was opened December 1960.

In 1961, this segment of road was redesignated I-287 to make it a part of the beltway around New York City. I-287 was to continue past I-95 in Port Chester and was to cross Long Island Sound via the unbuilt Oyster Bay–Rye Bridge. On Long Island, the route would run along the Seaford–Oyster Bay Expressway (NY 135). Then, I-287 was again to be extended into Jones Beach by merging with the Wantagh State Parkway in Merrick. The plans for the bridge, and the I-287 extension onto Long Island, were dropped in 1973 by Governor Nelson Rockefeller as a result of community opposition and environmental concerns.

Ownership of the Cross Westchester Expressway was transferred from the New York State Department of Transportation (NYSDOT) to the NYSTA in 1990 to help relieve the state's budget issues.

On July 27, 1994, a propane truck crashed into an overpass on the Cross Westchester Expressway in White Plains and exploded, killing the driver. The fire from the explosion spread into adjacent neighborhoods and injured 23 people.

Since 1999, the Cross Westchester Expressway has been under construction in order to reduce congestion and improve safety for the motorists who use the highway. The final phase of the project, a reconstruction in the area of exit 8 in White Plains, was completed in December 2012, nine months ahead of schedule.

In late 2018, NYSDOT began installing ramp meters on entrance ramps to I-287 in Rockland and Westchester Counties. More are expected to be installed by 2020.

=== Tappan Zee Bridge replacement ===
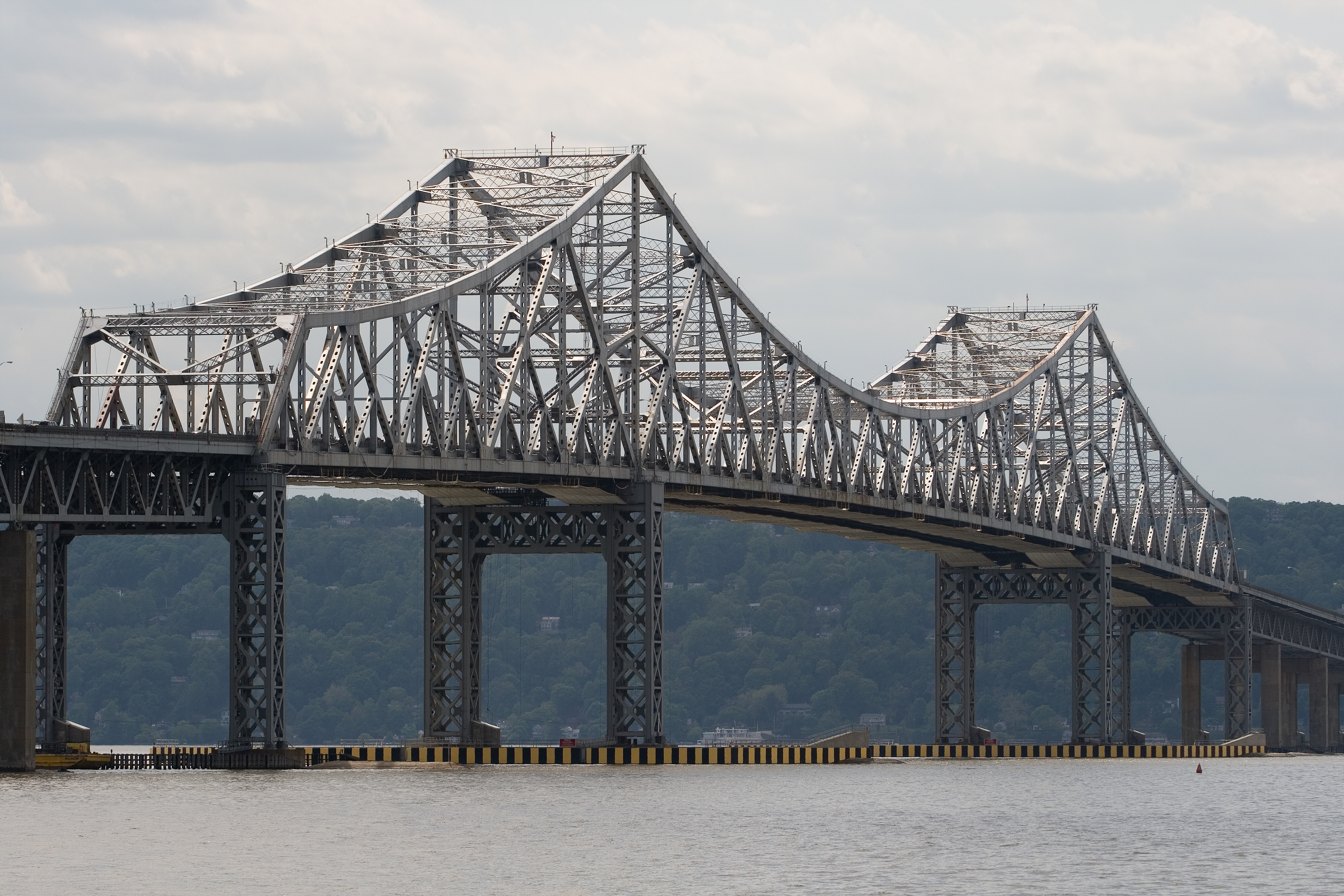
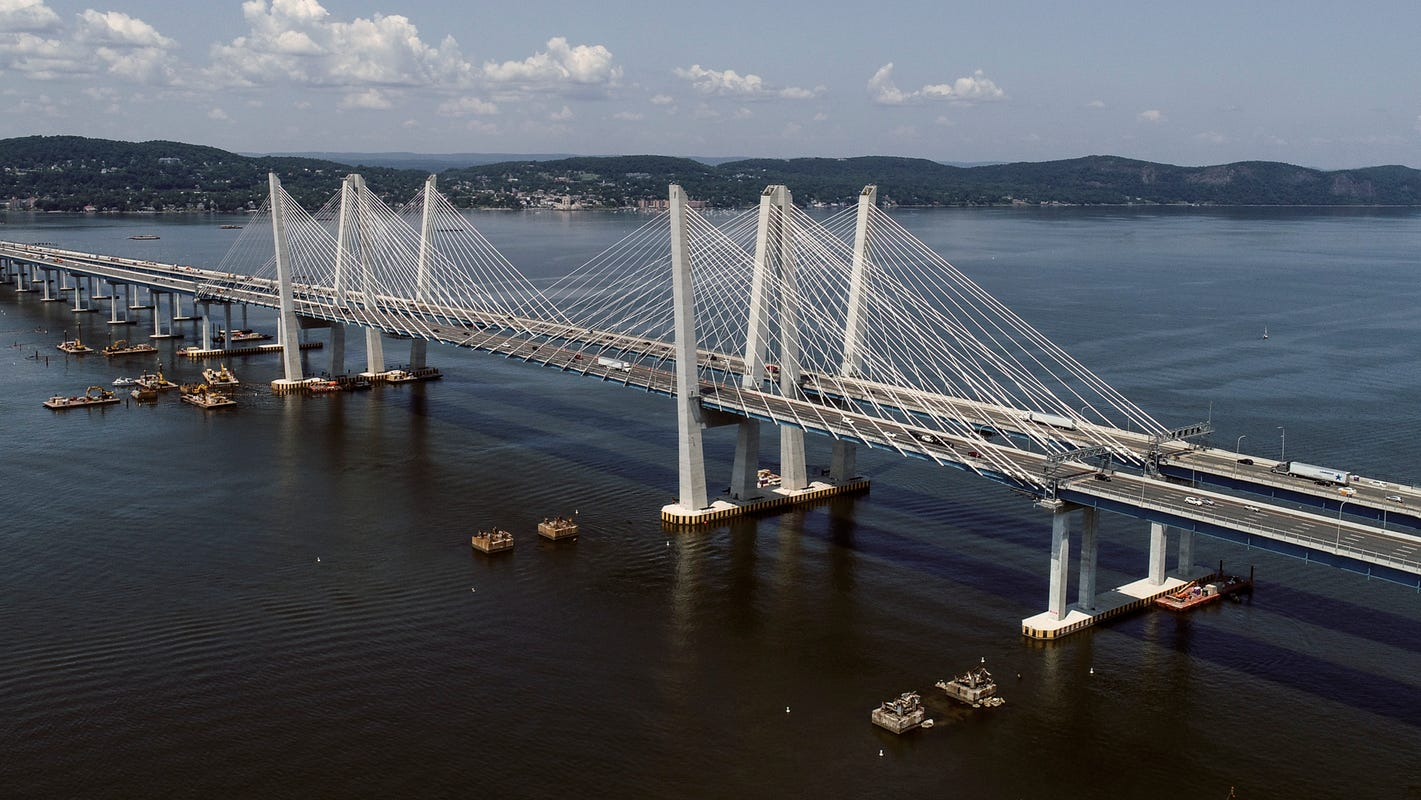
The original Tappan Zee Bridge in 2007 (left), and the New Tappan Zee Bridge in 2020 (right)

The Tappan Zee Bridge, carrying the concurrency of New York State Thruway, I-87, and I-287, was a cantilever bridge built during 1952–1955. The bridge was three miles (4.8 km) long and spanned the Hudson at its second-widest point. Before its replacement in 2017, the deteriorating structure carried an average of 138,000 vehicles per day, substantially more traffic than its designed capacity. During its first decade, the bridge carried fewer than 40,000 vehicles per day. Part of the justification for replacing the bridge stems from its construction immediately following the Korean War on a low budget of only $81 million (equivalent to $759 million in 2025). Unlike other major bridges in the New York metropolitan area, the Tappan Zee was designed to last only 50 years. The Federal Highway Administration (FHWA) issued a report in October 2011 designating the Tappan Zee's replacement to be dual-span twin bridges. Construction officially began in October 2013, with the new spans being built to the north of the existing bridge. The new bridge connects to the existing highway approaches of I-87 and I-287 on both river banks.

The northbound/westbound span opened on August 25, 2017. Southbound/eastbound traffic remained on the old bridge until October 6, 2017. At that point, southbound/eastbound traffic shifted to the westbound span of the new bridge and the old bridge closed. The bridge's eastbound span opened to traffic on September 11, 2018. Upon completion, the new Tappan Zee Bridge became one of the longest cable-stayed spans in the nation.

== Future ==
In 2008, a private firm, Polimeni Associates, proposed to construct a more than 16-mile-long (26 km) tunnel across Long Island Sound between Rye and Oyster Bay. This proposed tunnel would be the longest highway tunnel in the world, with its length exceeding that of the Lærdal Tunnel in Norway by a mile (1.6 km). It would start at the junction with the Cross Westchester Expressway and the New England Thruway in Rye and end at NY 135 and NY 25 in Syosset. Estimated to cost approximately $10 billion, it would feature three tubes: the outer tubes would have three lanes of vehicular traffic each and the inner tube would be used for maintenance. The proposed tunnel, which is to be operated by a private firm, is still awaiting approval to begin construction.

== Memorial designations ==
I-287 has been designated as the Korean War Veterans Memorial Highway since 1995. There are signs on the highway and sections are named in honor of Korean War veterans. The Morris County portion is designated for U.S. Marine Corps veteran Hector Cafferata Jr., a Medal of Honor recipient. The Bergen County portion is designated for U.S. Army Staff Sergeant Walter Bray, and the Passaic County portion for Air Force gunner Clarence "Red" Mosely. The Somerset County portion is dedicatetd to Navy Captain Joseph Azzolina, and the Middlesex County portion for Lt. Col. Richard Lauer. The I-287/Harter Road interchange at exit 33 in Morris Township is named the Warren E. Wilhide Interchange in honor of a U.S. Army veteran who was based in Chunchon, Korea, and lived very close to the Harter Road exit.

== Exit list ==
The mileposts below follow actual signage, even though the route is continuous.

State	County	Location	mi	km	Old exit	New exit	Destinations	Notes
New Jersey	Middlesex	Edison	0.00	0.00		—	Route 440 north to G.S. Parkway / US 9 – Perth Amboy, Staten Island	Continuation north
New Jersey	Middlesex	Edison	0.00	0.00		—	I-95 Toll / N.J. Turnpike / CR 514 – New York City, Trenton, Woodbridge, Bonhamtown, Raritan Center	No southbound access to CR 514; exit 10 on I-95 / Turnpike
New Jersey	Middlesex	Edison	0.93	1.50	38	1	US 1 / CR 531 – Trenton, Newark	Signed as exits 1A (CR 531 north) & 1B (CR 531 south); no southbound access to CR 531 north; CR 531 not signed northbound
New Jersey	Middlesex	Edison	2.24	3.60	36		Route 27 – Metuchen, New Brunswick	Northbound exit and southbound entrance; signed as exits 2A (NJ 27 north) and 2B (NJ 27 south)
New Jersey	Middlesex	Edison	3.09	4.97	35	3	CR 501 (New Durham Road) – New Durham, Metuchen	Southbound exit and northbound entrance
New Jersey	Middlesex	South Plainfield	4.62	7.44	33	4	Durham Avenue – South Plainfield	Northbound exit and southbound entrance
New Jersey	Middlesex	South Plainfield–Piscataway line	5.88	9.46	1	5	CR 529 (Stelton Road) – Dunellen, Edison	
New Jersey	Middlesex	Piscataway	6.41	10.32	2	6	Washington Avenue – Piscataway, Dunellen	No southbound entrance
New Jersey	Middlesex	Piscataway	7.27	11.70	3	7	South Randolphville Road – Piscataway, Middlesex	
New Jersey	Middlesex	Piscataway	8.47	13.63	4	8	Route 18 south (Centennial Avenue) / Possumtown Road – Middlesex, Highland Park	Signed for Centennial Avenue southbound, Possumtown Road northbound; northern terminus of Route 18
New Jersey	Middlesex	Piscataway	9.95	16.01	5	9	River Road (CR 622) – Bound Brook, Highland Park	
New Jersey	Somerset	Franklin Township	10.27	16.53	6	10	CR 527 (Easton Avenue) – New Brunswick, South Bound Brook	
New Jersey	Somerset	Franklin Township	12.30	19.79	7	12	Weston Canal Road (CR 623) – Manville, South Bound Brook	
New Jersey	Somerset	Bridgewater Township	13.50	21.73	9	13	Route 28 – Somerville, Bound Brook	Signed as exits 13A (NJ 28 east) and 13B (NJ 28 west) northbound
New Jersey	Somerset	Bridgewater Township	14.24– 14.35	22.92– 23.09	10	14	US 22 to US 202 / US 206 – Newark, Clinton	No southbound access to US 22 west; signed as exits 14A (US 22 east) and 14B (US 22 west)
New Jersey	Somerset	Bridgewater Township	17.86	28.74	13	17	US 202 south / US 206 south to US 22 west – Somerville, Flemington	Southbound exit and northbound entrance
New Jersey	Somerset	Bedminster	21.17	34.07	17	21	I-78 – Easton, PA, New York City	Signed as exits 21A (I-78 east) and 21B (I-78 west); exit 29 on I-78
New Jersey	Somerset	Bedminster	22.21	35.74	18	22	US 202 / US 206 – Pluckemin, Bedminster, Netcong	Signed as 22A (202 / 206 south) & 22B (202 / 206 north) northbound; Netcong not signed southbound
New Jersey	Somerset	Bernards Township	26.48	42.62	22	26	CR 525 (Mount Airy Road) – Liberty Corner, Bernardsville	Signed as exits 26A (CR 525 south) and 26B (CR 525 north) northbound
New Jersey	Somerset	Bernards Township	29.94	48.18	26	30	US 202 / North Maple Avenue – Bernardsville, Basking Ridge	Signed as exits 30A (Maple Avenue) and 30B (US 202)
New Jersey	Morris	Morris Township	34.02	54.75	29	33	Harter Road	
New Jersey	Morris	Morristown	35.77– 35.89	57.57– 57.76	31	35	Route 124 (South Street / Madison Avenue)	
New Jersey	Morris	Morristown	36.39– 36.60	58.56– 58.90	32	36	CR 510 (Morris Avenue / Lafayette Avenue) / Ridgedale Avenue	Signed as exits 36A (CR 510 east) and 36B (CR 510 west) northbound; Ridgedale Avenue not signed northbound
New Jersey	Morris	Hanover Township	37.92– 38.00	61.03– 61.16		37	Route 24 east to I-78 east – Springfield	I-78 not signed northbound; western terminus of Route 24
New Jersey	Morris	Hanover Township	39.55	63.65	35	39	Route 10 – Dover, Whippany	Signed as exits 39A (NJ 10 east) and 39B (NJ 10 west) southbound
New Jersey	Morris	Parsippany–Troy Hills	40.94	65.89	36B	40B	Entin Road / Sylvan Way	Southbound exit and entrance
New Jersey	Morris	Parsippany–Troy Hills	40.94	65.89	36A	40A	CR 511 (Parsippany Road) – Whippany, Lake Parsippany	Signed as exit 40 northbound
New Jersey	Morris	Parsippany–Troy Hills	42.02	67.62	37	41	I-80 / US 46 / Smith Road – Delaware Water Gap, New York City	No southbound access to US 46; signed as exits 41A (I-80 east) and 41B (I-80 west); exits 43A and 43B on I-80
New Jersey	Morris	Parsippany–Troy Hills	42.74	68.78	38	42	US 46 / US 202 (CR 511) – Dover, Clifton	No northbound exit
New Jersey	Morris	Parsippany–Troy Hills	44.06	70.91	39	43	Intervale Road (US 202 / CR 511) – Mountain Lakes	Northbound exit and southbound entrance
New Jersey	Morris	Boonton	44.95	72.34	40A	44	Main Street (US 202 / CR 511) – Boonton	Northbound exit and southbound entrance
New Jersey	Morris	Boonton	45.68	73.51	40B (NB); 41 (SB)	45	Myrtle Avenue (US 202) / Wootton Street – Boonton	
New Jersey	Morris	Montville	47.11	75.82	42	47	US 202 – Montville, Lincoln Park	
New Jersey	Morris	Riverdale	53.14	85.52		52	Route 23 – Riverdale, Wayne, Butler	Signed as exits 52A (NJ 23 south) and 52B (NJ 23 north)
New Jersey	Morris	Riverdale	53.83	86.63		53	CR 694 / CR 511 Alt. – Bloomingdale, Pompton Lakes	
New Jersey	Passaic	Wanaque	55.31	89.01		55	CR 511 / CR 511 Alt. – Wanaque, Pompton Lakes	
New Jersey	Bergen	Oakland	58.13	93.55		57	Skyline Drive (CR S-91) – Ringwood	
New Jersey	Bergen	Oakland	58.86	94.73		58	US 202 – Oakland	
New Jersey	Bergen	Oakland–Franklin Lakes line	59.94	96.46		59	Route 208 south – Franklin Lakes	Northern terminus of Route 208
New Jersey	Bergen	Mahwah	66.95	107.75		66	Route 17 south – Mahwah	Southern end of Route 17 concurrency
New Jersey–New York state line			67.54 0.00	108.70 0.00	Route 17 becomes NY 17			
New York	Rockland	Suffern	0.65 30.17	1.05 48.55		15	I-87 north / New York Thruway north / NY 17 north – Albany	Northern end of NY 17 concurrency; western end of I-87 / Thruway concurrency; exit number not signed northbound
New York	Rockland	Montebello	27.62	44.45		14B	Airmont Road (CR 89) – Airmont, Montebello	Access to Good Samaritan Regional Medical Center
New York	Rockland	Chestnut Ridge	24.31	39.12	Spring Valley Toll Gantry (E-ZPass or Toll by Mail; westbound trucks)			
New York	Rockland	Chestnut Ridge	23.53	37.87		14A	To G.S. Parkway south – New Jersey	Access via G.S. Parkway Connector
New York	Rockland	Nanuet	23.00	37.01		–	CR 35 (Pascack Road) / Old Turnpike Road	Eastbound entrance only
New York	Rockland	Nanuet	22.80	36.69		14	NY 59 (CR 35A) – Spring Valley, Nanuet	
New York	Rockland	West Nyack	20.94	33.70		13	Palisades Parkway – Bear Mountain, New Jersey	Signed as exits 13S (Palisades Parkway south) and 13N (Palisades Parkway north); exits 9E and 9W on Palisades Parkway
New York	Rockland	West Nyack	18.76	30.19		12	NY 303 / Palisades Center Drive – West Nyack	Palisades Center Drive not signed westbound
New York	Rockland	Nyack	17.63	28.37		11	To US 9W – Nyack, South Nyack	Eastbound exit and entrance; access via NY 59; last eastbound exit before toll
New York	Rockland	Nyack	17.63	28.37		11	US 9W / NY 59 west – Nyack	Westbound exit and entrance; access via High Avenue; NY 59 not signed
New York	Rockland	South Nyack	16.49	26.54		10	US 9W – Nyack, South Nyack	No eastbound exit
New York	Hudson River		14.50– 12.80	23.34– 20.60	Tappan Zee (Governor Mario M. Cuomo) Bridge (eastbound toll; E-ZPass or Toll by Mail)			
New York	Westchester	Tarrytown	12.65	20.36		9	US 9 / NY 119 east – Tarrytown, Sleepy Hollow	Eastbound exit and entrance; NY 119 not signed
New York	Westchester	Tarrytown	12.65	20.36		9	To US 9 – Tarrytown, Sleepy Hollow	Westbound exit and entrance; access via NY 119
New York	Westchester	Greenburgh	10.50 0.00	16.90 0.00		8	I-87 south (New York Thruway) / NY 119 / Saw Mill River Parkway north – New York City	No westbound access to NY 119/Saw Mill; eastern end of I-87 / Thruway concurrency; exit no. not signed westbound
New York	Westchester	Elmsford				1	NY 119 to Saw Mill River Parkway – Tarrytown	Westbound exit and eastbound entrance
New York	Westchester	Elmsford	1.45	2.33		2	NY 9A – Elmsford, Ardsley	No eastbound exit
New York	Westchester	Elmsford				3	Sprain Brook Parkway to Taconic State Parkway north – New York City	No eastbound access to Sprain Brook Parkway north
New York	Westchester	Elmsford	2.42	3.89		4	NY 100A – Hartsdale	
New York	Westchester	Greenburgh	3.23	5.20		5	NY 100	Westbound exit only
New York	Westchester	Greenburgh	3.23	5.20		5	NY 100 south / NY 119 east – White Plains	No westbound exit
New York	Westchester	White Plains	4.32	6.95		6	NY 22 – North White Plains, White Plains	
New York	Westchester	White Plains				7	Central Westchester Parkway north	Westbound exit and eastbound entrance; southern terminus of Central Westchester Parkway
New York	Westchester	White Plains–Harrison line	5.65	9.09		8W	Bloomingdale Road / Westchester Mall Place	No westbound exit
New York	Westchester	White Plains–Harrison line	5.65	9.09		8E	NY 127 south / Westchester Avenue to Westchester Mall Place – Harrison, White Plains	Signed as exit 8 westbound; signed for NY 127/Harrison eastbound, Westchester Mall westbound; no eastbound entrance
New York	Westchester	White Plains–Harrison line	6.91	11.12		9A	I-684 north / Westchester Avenue – Brewster	No westbound access to Westchester Avenue; southern terminus of I-684; former I-87
New York	Westchester	Harrison	8.09	13.02		9	Hutchinson River Parkway to Merritt Parkway north (Route 15 north) – Whitestone Bridge	Cloverleaf interchange with Westchester Avenue; signed as exits 9S (Hutchinson River Parkway south) and 9N (Hutchinson River Parkway north); exits 15A and 15B on Hutchinson Parkway
New York	Westchester	Harrison	8.79	14.15		10	NY 120 / NY 120A north – Purchase, Port Chester	No westbound exit; southern terminus of NY 120A
New York	Westchester	Harrison				10	Bowman Avenue / Webb Avenue	Westbound exit only
New York	Westchester	Rye–Port Chester line	10.89	17.53		11	US 1 – Rye, Port Chester	Eastbound exit and westbound entrance
New York	Westchester	City of Rye				12	I-95 south – New York	No eastbound entrance; exit number not signed westbound; exit 21 on I-95
New York	Westchester	City of Rye				—	Midland Avenue – Port Chester, Rye	Westbound exit and entrance
New York	Westchester	City of Rye	11.33	18.23		—	I-95 north – Connecticut Turnpike, New Haven	Eastern terminus
1.000 mi = 1.609 km; 1.000 km = 0.621 mi: Concurrency terminus; Electronic toll collection; Incomplete access; Tolled; Route transition
