= The Westchester =

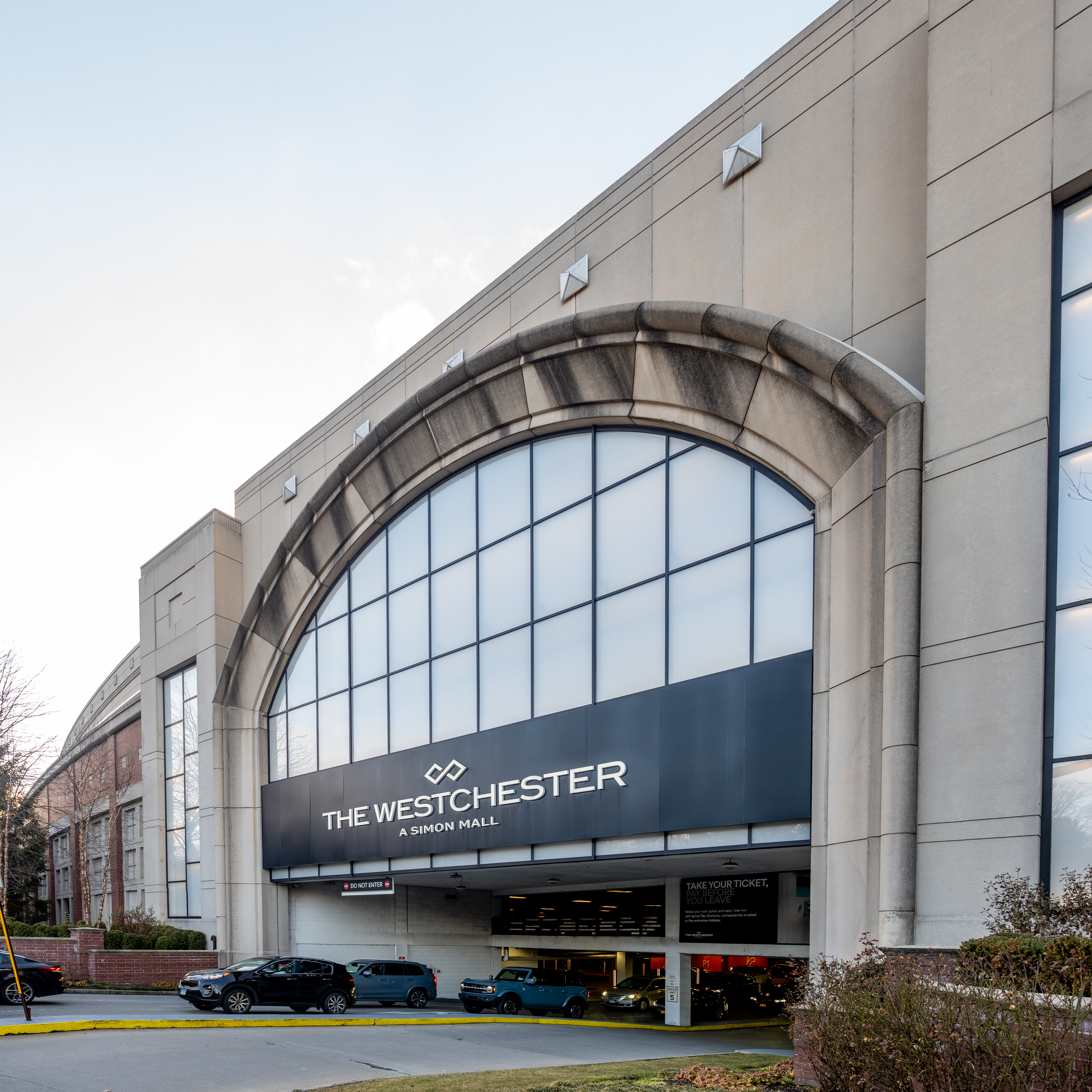
- Vehicle Entrance (2023)
- Coordinates: 41.031°N 73.758°W
- Address: 125 Westchester Avenue, White Plains, Westchester County, NY 10601-4522 USA
- Opened: 1995
- Developer: O'Connor Group
- Manager: Alexander's, Inc
- Num. of stores: 133
- Num. of anchor tenants: 3
- Floors: 2-3, with 4th floor food court (4 in Neiman Marcus)
- Parking: Indoor
- Public transit: Metro-North Railroad: Harlem Line at White Plains}

The Westchester is an upscale shopping mall located in downtown White Plains, New York. It is operated by Simon Property Group, which owns 40% of the mall, and is home to many well-known retailers, some with their only location in Westchester County. It is anchored by Neiman Marcus, Crate & Barrel, and New York State's first Nordstrom, the fourth in the New York City metropolitan area to open after locations in Short Hills, Menlo Park, and Paramus, New Jersey.

== History ==
Opened in 1995, The Westchester was built on the site of one of the first suburban branch department stores in the United States, a B. Altman & Co. store which opened in 1930, as well as the terminal for the New York, Westchester and Boston Railway White Plains branch. B. Altman's was located where Nordstrom is now situated. The mall was built adjacent to the (once) freestanding location of Neiman Marcus, which originally opened in 1972 as the only out-of-town location of its sister chain, New York-based Bergdorf Goodman. The Westchester is located near to the Sonesta Hotel (Formerly The Crowne Plaza Hotel), The Opus Westchester Hotel (Formerly The Ritz-Carlton Hotel), The Source at White Plains, The White Plains Pavilion, City Center at White Plains, and the now permanently closed Galleria at White Plains. The mall's food court, located on the fourth floor, is known as Savor Westchester. The food court includes Melt Shop and Shake Shack. The fourth floor used to have a typical food court and a large F.A.O. Schwarz that closed in the early 2000s. Starting in February 2016, the mall underwent its largest renovation since opening in 1995, which included installing a new façade, tiling and carpeting.

On March 6, 2026, Saks Global announced the closure of 12 Saks Fifth Avenue and 3 Neiman Marcus locations nationwide in an effort to further cut costs and focus on more profitable locations, including the Neiman Marcus store at The Westchester. On March 24, 2026, Saks announced they had come to an agreement with their landlord and would no longer be closing.
