= Gallery (surname) =

Gallery is a surname. Notable people with the surname include:

- Daniel V. Gallery (1901–1977), Rear Admiral in the U.S. Navy during World War II; fought in the Battle of the Atlantic
- Mary Onahan Gallery (1866–1941), American writer, editor
- Philip D. Gallery (1907–1973), Rear Admiral in the U.S. Navy during World War II; served on naval destroyers in the Pacific Theater
- Robert Gallery (born 1980), American football player
- Tom Gallery (1897–1993), American silent film actor, sports promoter, and television executive
- William O. Gallery (1904–1981), Rear Admiral in the U.S. Navy during World War II; served as a naval aviator in the Pacific Theater

== See also ==
- Gallery (disambiguation)
