= The Galleries =

The Galleries may refer to:

in England

- The Galleries, Bristol, a shopping mall
- Galleries Shopping Centre, Washington
- The Galleries (Wigan), a shopping centre

in the United States

- The Galleries (Vicksburg, Mississippi), listed on the NRHP in Mississippi

== See also ==
- Gallery (disambiguation)
- The Galeries, a shopping centre in Sydney, Australia
