= Galleria (Espoo shopping centre) =

Shopping center in Espoo, Finland

Coordinates: 60°13′17.11″N 24°48′44.62″E

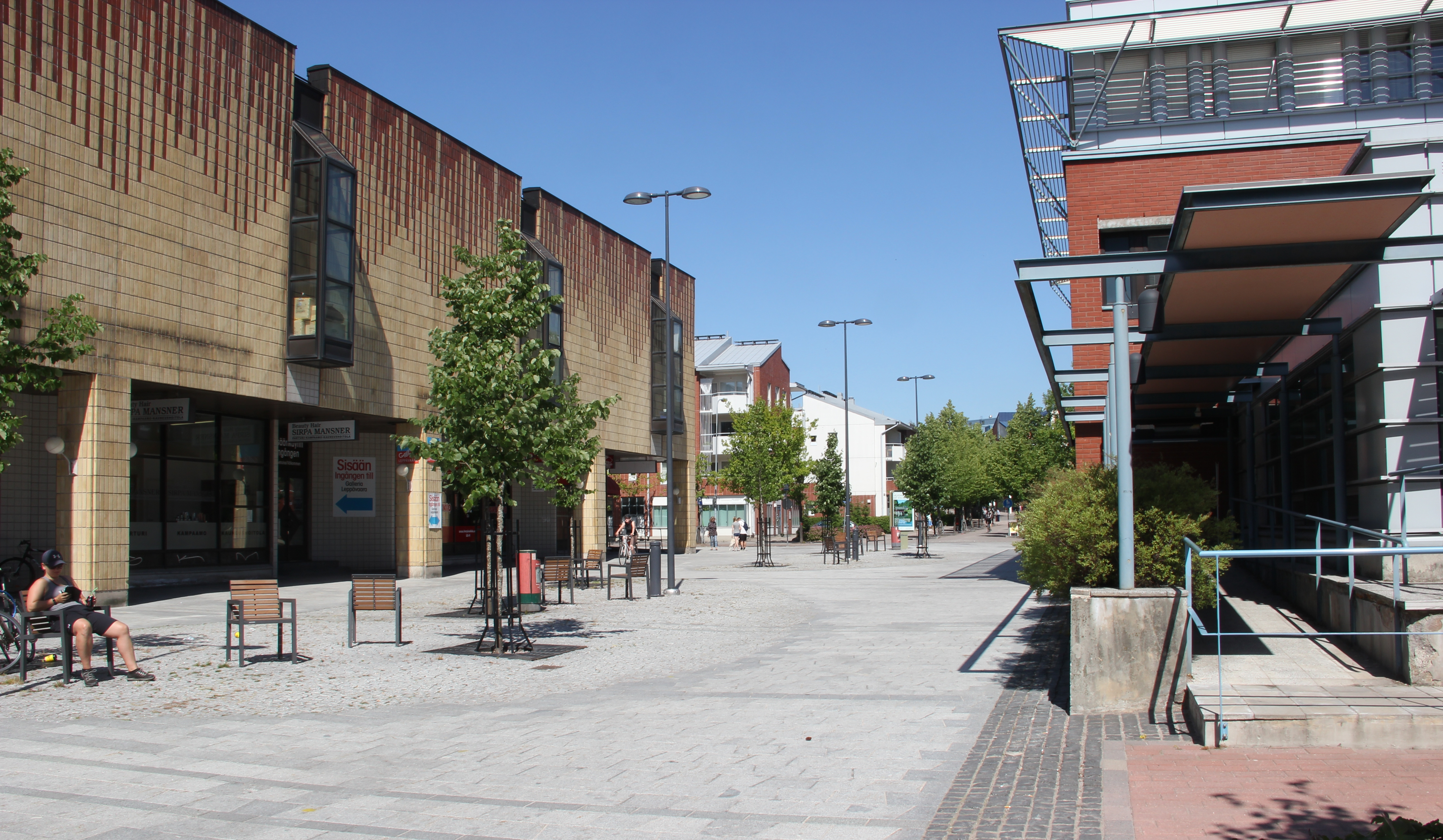
A view of the Leppävaaranraitti street with the shopping centre Galleria on the left and the Leppävaara health centre on the right.

Galleria is a shopping centre in the district of Leppävaara in Espoo, Finland. It is located north of the Turuntie highway in northern Leppävaara. The ground floor has a grocery store, a café and a restaurant, while the second floor has services for wellbeing, the largest of which being a health club and a dance centre.

The shopping centre was completed in 1985 and was renovated from 2011 to 2012. The Läkkitori square in front of it was renovated from 2013 to 2015. After the square had been completed, it had gradually lost its forum-like nature as trade on it diminished. The square became a restless space and its surface became warped.

The shopping centre was designed by architect Kalevi Ruokosuo. The ornamental building with its 40-metre illuminated mast was first met with resistance at the facade board of the city of Espoo. The building was originally designed as a merchant department store collectively owned by its merchants, and the businesses inside it were located next to each other without intermediate walls, like the departments in a department store. Original tenants in the ground floor included a grocery store with a surface area of one thousand square metres, a restaurant, a confectionery business, a plant shop and two bank offices. The second floor held businesses for special needs. The interior decoration used many plants and fountains.

The site of the shopping centre originally hosted a paddock for horses during the Russian fortification for World War I from 1915 to 1917, followed by allotment gardens during World War II and a sports field after that. There is a plaque on the wall of the Leppävaara health centre commemorating the local history before the construction of the health centre and the shopping centre.

The Sello mall was later built on the other side of the rails, which has significantly reduced the number of customers in Galleria. Several suggestions have been put forth for Galleria to be demolished and residential and commercial buildings to be built in its place. The city of Espoo started soliciting architectural proposals for the area in May 2022.
