= Shooting gallery =

Shooting gallery may refer to:

== Firearms and amusements ==
- Shooting gallery (carnival game), a facility for shooting live firearms or for shooting recreational guns within amusement parks, arcades, carnivals, or fairgrounds
- Shooting range, is a specialized facility designed for firearms qualifications, training or practice.

== Arts, entertainment, and media ==
=== Gaming ===
- Shooting Gallery (game accessory), light gun accessory and game of the same name for the Magnavox Odyssey home video game console
- Shooting Gallery, a light gun game developed and published in 1987 by Sega for Master System
- Shooting Gallery, a 1976 video game for the Fairchild Channel F released as part of Videocart-1 and Videocart-2
- Shooting gallery game, a video game subgenre of shooter games

=== Music ===
- Shooting Gallery (band), a 1990s rock group featuring Andy McCoy
- "Shooting Gallery", a song by 1980s Welsh singer Shakin' Stevens, released as a single from his album This Ole House

=== Other arts, entertainment, and media ===
- Shooting Gallery (TV series), a television series on the Outdoor Channel
- TSG Pictures (also known as The Shooting Gallery), a film production company established in 1990 by Bob Gosse

== Narcotics ==
Shooting gallery, a slang term for a:

- Crack house or heroin den
- Supervised injection site
