= Galleria Kunstfestival =

Art festival in Norway

Galleria Artfestival is an artist-run initiative in Norway, run by visual artists to present their and others projects. This might approximate a traditional art gallery space in appearance or function, or it may take a markedly different approach, limited only by the artists themselves.

Workshops, social happenings and networking is some of the prime goals of Galleria Artfestival.

Galleria Art festival took place for the first time in 2006. The festival is taking place in Mosjøen, Norway, from 12 to 19 July 2008. The slogan for the festival is "Norway's longest gallery"; and every possible space of the old historical part of Mosjøen is being used to present different kinds of art. The old tree houses in the historical part of Mosjøen in northern Norway contain stores, galleries, dwellings, restaurants, museum and so on. This environment gives great surroundings and hospitality for both art and artists and spectators as well. Take a stroll in this environment and look for picturesque details.

Galleria uses the slogan ”Norway's longest gallery” because you have to take your shoes for a walk over a distance of 7–800 meters to watch the exhibitions.

Galleria Art festivals main goals:

- Build connections and swap knowledge and competence
- Exploit the distinctive stamp of the town Mosjøen and give great adventures
- Develop art and culture into business opportunities
- Gain understanding and interest for the cultures significance in society
