= Galleria at White Plains =

Coordinates: 41.031262°N 73.770876°W

The Galleria at White Plains
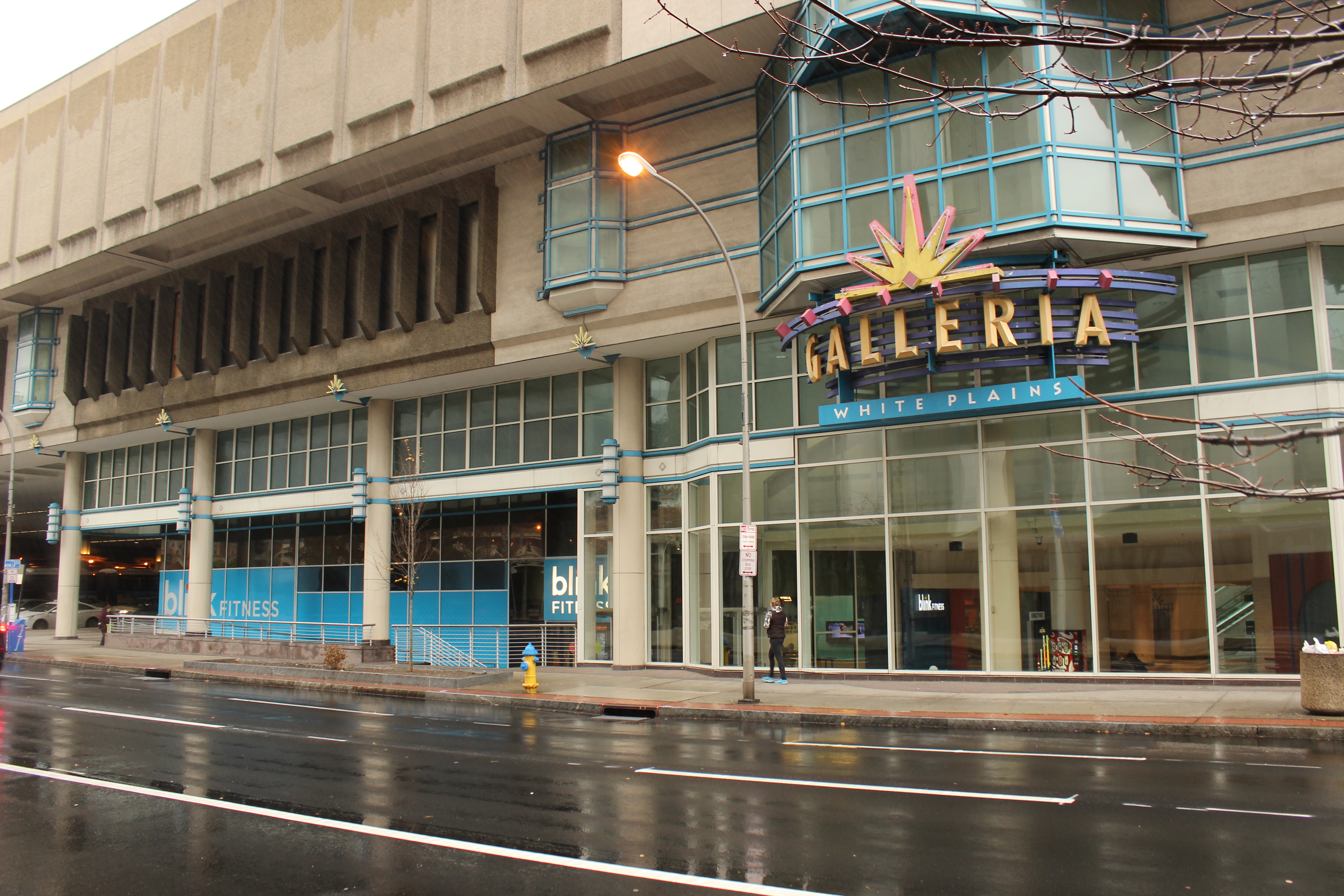
- Galleria at White Plains in 2014
- Address: 100 Main Street, White Plains, New York, United States
- Opened: August 4, 1980
- Closed: March 31, 2023
- Developer: Cadillac Fairview
- Manager: Pacific Retail Capital Partners
- Owner: Farallon Cap. Mgt.
- Num. of stores: 85
- Num. of anchor tenants: 4
- Floor area: 865,000 square feet (80,400 m^{2})
- Floors: 2-3 with small lower level
- Public transit: Bee-Line Bus System: 20; Metro-North Railroad: White Plains station
- Website: galleriaatwhiteplains.com

The Galleria at White Plains is a defunct shopping mall located in downtown White Plains, New York, US, a suburb 20 miles (32 km) north of New York City. The mall featured the major anchors Macy's and Sears, and junior anchors Forever 21, H&M and Blink Fitness. It closed in 2023.

== History ==
The 900,000-square-foot (84,000 m^{2}) four-level mall was built by Cadillac Fairview, a Canadian developer, on two large city blocks of urban renewal land. It opened in the summer of 1980 and was the first of three Gallerias to open in 1980 in the United States, the others being Sherman Oaks and Fort Lauderdale. The original east anchor store was Abraham & Straus until converting to Stern's in 1995. On July 15, 1996, Macy's relocated its White Plains store to the Galleria, replacing Stern's. The west anchor JCPenney closed on April 28, 2001, and was left vacant until August 2003 when Sears moved in.

Martin Luther King Blvd. runs directly underneath the mall. The Galleria was constructed adjacent to a large two-block-long parking garage that is connected directly to the mall at various levels. Shopping floors were color-coded blue, green, yellow, and red representing Street Level, Garden Level, the Garden food court area, and Fashion Level 1 and 2, respectively when the mall opened.

The Galleria underwent a substantial renovation throughout the early-mid 1990s that undid many original elements; the glass elevator is the only significant feature dating from the mall's opening that survives relatively untouched. During the 1990s remodel, the waterfall and stage in the center court were replaced with two miniature fountains between the escalators. In later years, the mall experienced competition from newer and more upscale retail developments, such as The Westchester mall and The Source at White Plains.

On September 18, 2006, Philip Grant, a homeless convicted rapist, was convicted of murder as a hate crime for stabbing Concetta Russo-Carriero to death in a Galleria parking garage on June 29, 2005, because, according to Grant's videotaped confession, she was white with blond hair and blue eyes.

Interior shots of the mall were used in the 2018 film Eighth Grade as well as the 2022 film Somewhere in Queens.

On November 10, 2020, it was announced Sears would close. On January 5, 2021, Macy's announced as part of a strategy to focus on the highest achieving locations that they would be closing.

=== Closure and redevelopment ===
In November 2022, it was announced that the owners of The Galleria at White Plains were teaming up with two prominent development firms to update the mall as a mixed-use center that will involve both residential development and amenity-based retail. One of the developers, Louis R. Cappelli, has had a presence in White Plains for decades and is known for developing the nearby 46-story Ritz-Carlton towers. On December 21, 2022, PRCP announced that the Galleria at White Plains would close the following March for redevelopment. The mall's last day of operation was March 31, 2023.

Redevelopment plans for the property were released in November 2023. The proposed mixed-use space, named District Galleria, would include over 3,200 residential units and over 200,000 square feet (19,000 m^{2}) of retail space.
