= City Center at White Plains =

Shopping complex in New York State

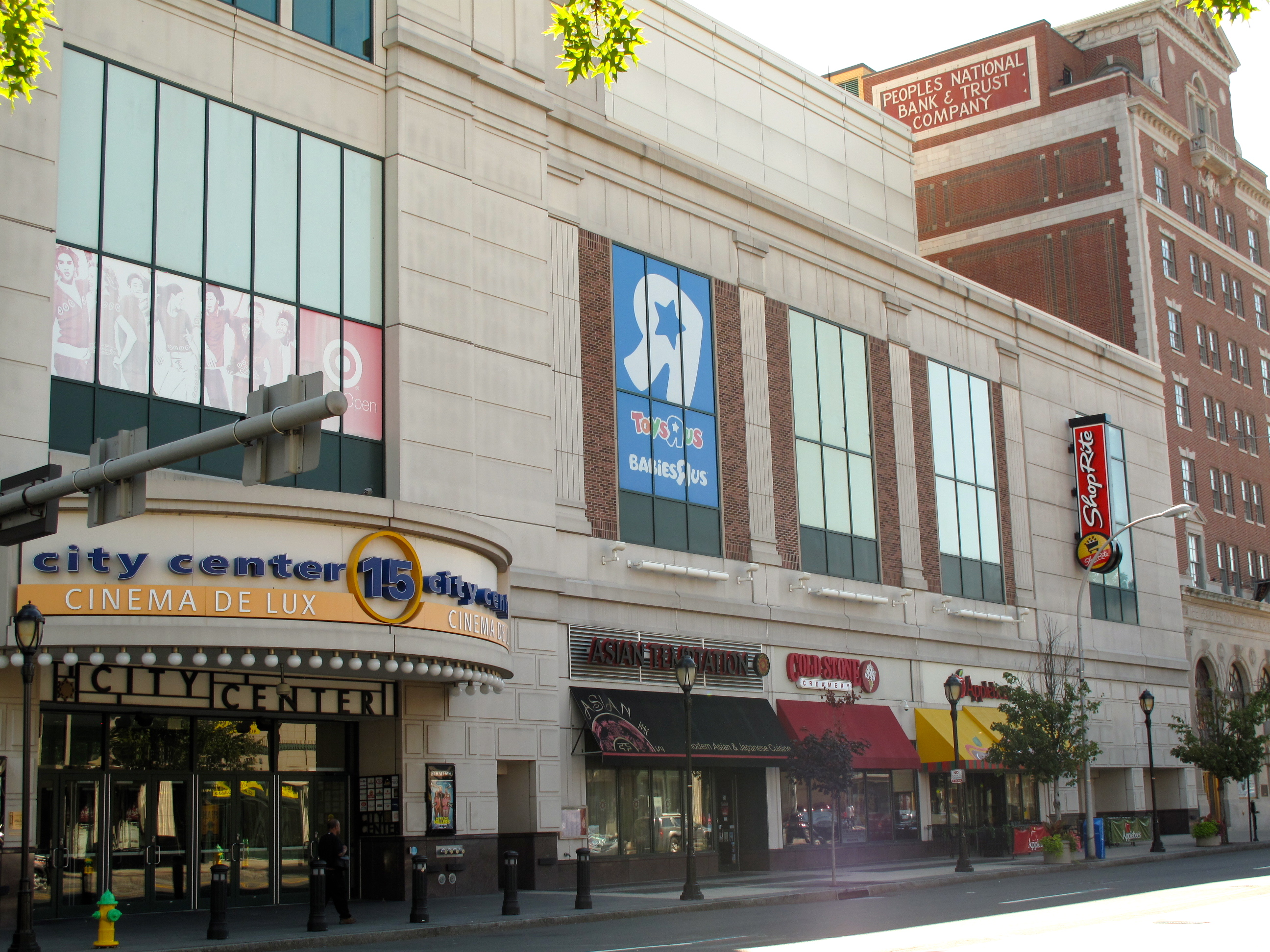
- Location: White Plains, New York
- Coordinates: 41°1′56″N 73°45′56″W
- Opened: 2003
- Num. of stores: 14
- Public transit: White Plains station (Metro-North Railroad); Bee-Line Bus System at S Broadway
- Website: www.shopatcitycenter.com

City Center at White Plains is a large mixed-use development shopping complex in downtown White Plains, New York.

== Features ==
It features two 35-story apartment and condominium towers, known as The Tower at City Place, 600,000-square-foot (60,000 m^{2}) of retail, restaurants, entertainment space and parking facilities. It also includes the White Plains Performing Arts Center. A 15-screen cinema operated by National Amusements as Showcase Cinema de Lux previously occupied the building before its initial closure in October 2023. The theater reopened under Apple Cinemas on May 16, 2024.

== Opening and purpose ==
City Center's opening in 2003 was part of a redevelopment scheme to revitalize downtown White Plains after a decades-long period of real estate and business decline in common with economic issues experienced by similar-sized cities at the end of the twentieth century. Beginning in the 1990s, economic stimulation in the New York City region and the wider national economy spurred growth in the commercial and office leasing markets in White Plains, helping to solidify the city's position as the dominant business center of Westchester County.
