= Blind Brook =

Blind Brook may refer to:

- Blind Brook High School
- Blind Brook School District
