= Port Chester High School =

School in Port Chester, New York, US

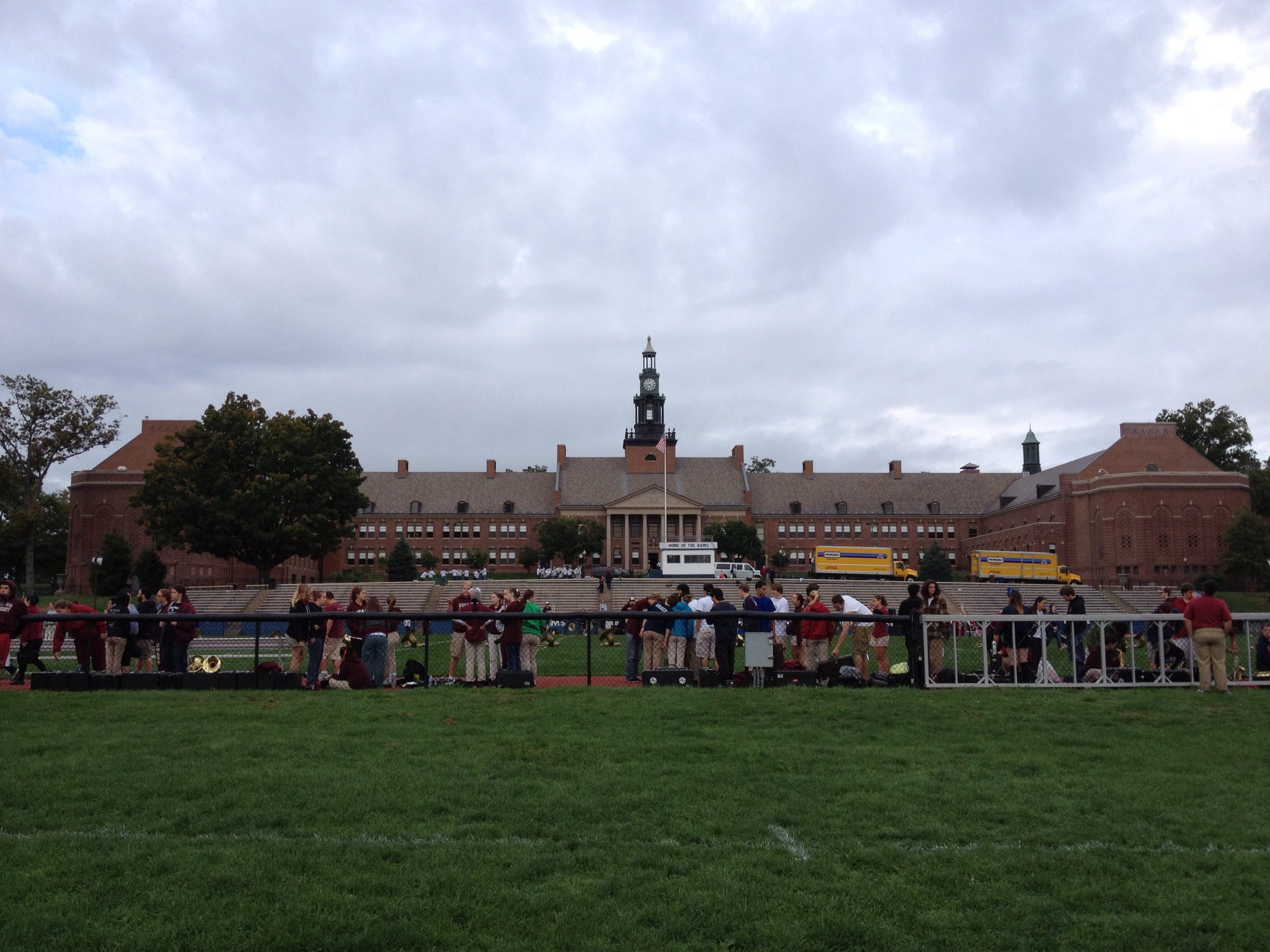

Location
- 1 Tamarack Road; Port Chester, New York 10573; United States; 41°00′42″N 73°40′43″W

Information
- Motto: Truth and knowledge are the fruits of learning
- Established: 1929
- School district: Port Chester-Rye Union Free School District
- Principal: Luke A. Sotherden
- Teaching staff: 111.68 (on an FTE basis)
- Grades: 9–12
- Enrollment: 1,572 (2023–2024)
- Student to teacher ratio: 14.08
- Campus size: 20 Acres (871,200 sq ft)
- Color
- Athletics conference: Section 1 NYSPHSAA
- Nickname: Rams
- Rivals: Mamaroneck, Greenwich
- Accreditation: Middle States Association of Colleges and Schools
- Yearbook: Peningian
- Website: portchesterschools.org/pchs/home

Port Chester High School is a public high school in Port Chester, New York, United States. It is the sole senior high school of the Port Chester-Rye Union Free School District, and its principal is Luke Sotherden. The school is ranked 134th in the state and 1,481st in the United States, according to the U.S. News & World Report "Best High Schools" rankings from 2018.

The school was founded in 1929. The building, on the former grounds of a country club, was designed by Tooker & Marsh in "Harvard" style with a prominent clock tower, and completed in 1932. As constructed, it contained 140,000 square feet (13,000 m^{2}) of space including a 94 by 72 feet (29 m × 22 m) gymnasium, a 1250-seat auditorium, 38 classrooms, two study halls, four shops, and a model apartment for homemaking classes. The building had radio equipment and an electric fire alarm system, and all its clocks were synchronized to an electric master clock.

The district (and therefore the high school's attendance boundary) is located within portions of the Town of Rye. All of Port Chester is in the district. About 30% of the village of Rye Brook is in the district, and the remainder is in the Blind Brook School District.

== Academics ==
The school offers the International Baccalaureate Diploma in addition to Advanced Placement and college-level courses.

== Athletics ==
Port Chester High School competes in Section 1 of the New York State Public High School Athletic Association. The school has teams in football, soccer, volleyball, cross country running, cheerleading, tennis, swimming, basketball, wrestling, indoor track, bowling, baseball, softball, track & field, and golf.

== Notable alumni ==
- Herman Barron (1909–1978), professional golfer
- Jonathan Del Arco (class of 1984), actor and activist
- Joe Langworth (class of 1984), Broadway actor, choreographer and director
- Dan McDonnell (class of 1988), college baseball coach, Louisville Cardinals head coach
- Ruth Roberts (class of 1944, but does not appear among senior portraits in yearbook), songwriter of "The First Thing Ev'ry Morning (And the Last Thing Ev'ry Night)" and "Meet the Mets"
- David Tutera (class of 1984), celebrity wedding planner, reality television personality
- Edwin B. Wheeler (class of 1935), General of the US Marine Corps
- Ed Sullivan (1901–1974), American television personality

== Notable faculty ==
- Kenneth R. Force (1966–1971), band director
