= Robert J. Jackson Jr. =

American lawyer and academic

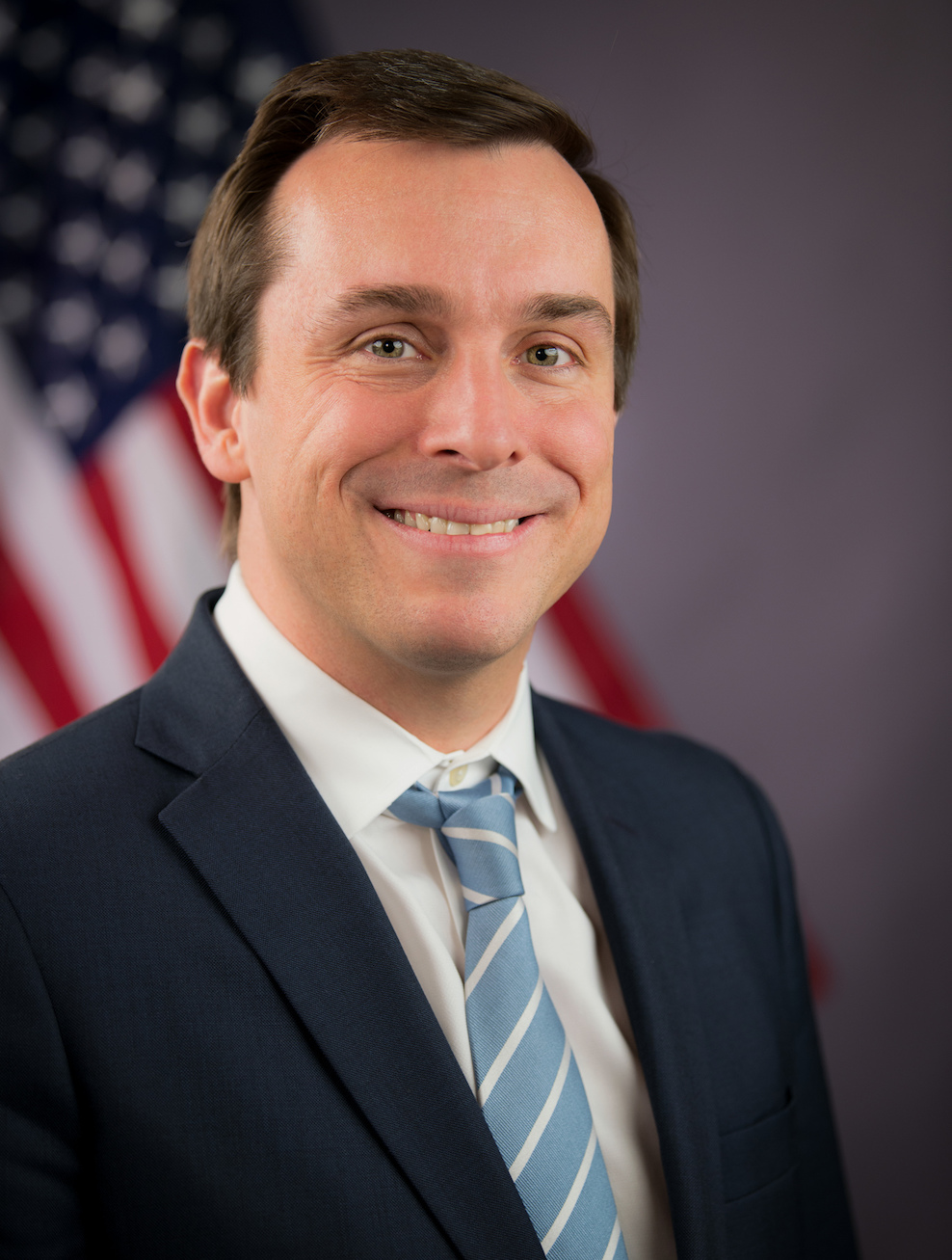

Commissioner of the United States Securities and Exchange Commission
- In office January 11, 2018 – February 14, 2020
- President: Donald Trump
- Chairman: Jay Clayton
- Preceded by: Mary Jo White
- Succeeded by: Caroline A. Crenshaw

Personal details
- Born: February 14, 1977 (age 49)
- Party: Democratic
- Education: University of Pennsylvania (BA, BS, MBA); Harvard University (MPP, JD)

Academic work
- Discipline: Executive compensation, corporate governance, corporate finance, corporate law
- Institutions: New York University School of Law

Robert Joseph Jackson Jr. (born February 14, 1977) is an American lawyer and academic. He currently serves as a professor of law at New York University School of Law, where he is on public service leave. Jackson's research emphasizes the empirical study of executive compensation and corporate governance matters. On September 1, 2017, the White House announced that President Donald Trump had nominated Jackson to fill the open Democratic seat on the U.S. Securities and Exchange Commission (SEC). Jackson was unanimously approved by the Senate Banking Committee for the seat, and thereafter unanimously confirmed by the United States Senate on December 21, 2017.

== Education ==
Jackson attended the Wharton School of the University of Pennsylvania where he graduated summa cum laude with bachelor's degrees in philosophy and finance. As an undergraduate, he was a submatriculant in the MBA program at the Wharton School with a concentration in finance. Prior to receiving his MBA in 2000, Jackson spent his summer as a Judicial Intern at the Supreme Court working for James C. Duff, Administrative Assistant to the Chief Justice.

Jackson went on to attend Harvard University's John F. Kennedy School of Government and Harvard Law School, where he received, respectively, his Master of Public Policy and Juris Doctor. At Harvard's Kennedy School, Jackson along with co-author Jesse Jannetta won the Taubman Prize for best thesis for their policy analysis of the Massachusetts Parole Board's Regional Reentry Center Initiative. He trained under Lucian Bebchuk at Harvard Law School, and following his graduation in 2005, was appointed the Terence M. Considine Research Fellow in Law and Economics by the law school and the Olin Foundation.

== Professional background ==
Prior to joining the Columbia Law faculty in 2009, he worked in investment banking at Bear Stearns, specialized in executive compensation and corporate governance at Wachtell, Lipton, Rosen, & Katz, and served as deputy director to Kenneth Feinberg at the United States Treasury, helping to establish executive pay rules for corporations such as AIG, Citigroup, and General Motors after the 2008 financial crisis. He also developed Obama administration proposals on executive compensation and corporate governance that became part of the Dodd–Frank Wall Street Reform and Consumer Protection Act, and testified before the Senate Banking Committee about agency shortcomings on proposed rules for bonus compensation, rules which were later amended.

He received the Columbia Law School 2012 Willis L.M. Reese Prize for Excellence in Teaching, and has taught abroad in China, Italy, and the Netherlands. He has supervised the research of a number of law school students at Columbia, and has mentored postdoctoral fellows, preparing them for academia at law schools, such as Colleen Honigsberg at Stanford Law and Joshua Mitts at Columbia Law, James Nelson at the University of Houston Law Center, and Kevin Haeberle at William & Mary Law School.

== Research and policy ==
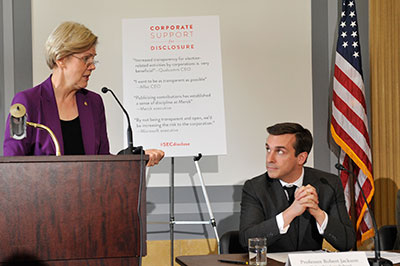
Elizabeth Warren and Jackson at a briefing on corporate political spending disclosure

In November 2014, Jackson co-authored a paper titled How the SEC Helps Speedy Traders, which showed how the SEC allowed certain investors early access to key information in public company filings through the SEC's file transfer protocol (FTP) and public dissemination service (PDS). The gaps, 11-seconds and 10-seconds long, allowed investors employing high-frequency trading to make significant profit from this early access. After being reported by The Wall Street Journal, the Senate Banking Committee urged the SEC to fix the disparity in access, though Jackson showed that the gap persisted weeks later.

A paper in September 2015 uncovered a similar advantage enjoyed by certain traders called The 8-K Trading Gap, showing that company insiders traded their company's stock on the open market and profited doing so during the 4-day window between when market-moving information is known by company insiders and when they are required to disclose it to the public in an 8-K filing. In 2017, this work was cited by Senator Chris Van Hollen before the Senate Committee on Banking, Housing, and Urban Affairs and by Congresswoman Carolyn B. Maloney before the House Financial Services Committee discussing insider trading in the context of trading by Equifax executives after that company's 2017 hack.

Other research by Jackson has demonstrated The Effects of Usury Laws on Higher-Risk Borrowers, by showing that when usury laws became enforceable, credit issuance declined for higher-risk borrowers. The implications of this evidence became central during debate around the merits and risks of peer-to-peer lending platforms such as Lending Club, and Jackson wrote about the benefits of peer-to-peer lending that his research uncovered for The Wall Street Journal. In the opinion piece, Jackson notes that, "borrowers who cannot gain access to marketplace credit will likely choose instead higher-cost sources like credit cards with interest rates as high as 30%, making it harder to repay their debts. And because marketplace lending is subject to price caps but other lending is not, the decision is essentially a protectionist measure, giving banks a monopoly over lending to higher-risk borrowers."

Jackson also created CROWN, a Columbia Law School initiative to introduce data science techniques to extract data from legal filings for empirical research.

Together with Harvard professor Lucian Bebchuk, Jackson argued that the poison pill was unconstitutional through preemption of state anti-takeover laws by the Williams Act. They also advocated for disclosure of corporate political spending in corporations' annual public filings in their paper Corporate Political Speech: Who Decides? The issue gained media attention, including from President Barack Obama, as Republicans attempted to move a measure through the Senate which would prevent the SEC from requiring such disclosure of political contributions.

== Securities and Exchange Commission ==
The White House officially announced Jackson's nomination to the U.S. Securities and Exchange Commission (SEC) on September 1, 2017, the Senate Banking Committee unanimously approved his nomination on November 1, 2017, and he was sworn in as Commissioner on January 11, 2018. On December 21, 2019, it was reported that the White House is expected to nominate an attorney in Jackson's office, Caroline Crenshaw, who is also a Democratic attorney at the United States Securities and Exchange Commission (SEC) to take over Jackson, who is the current Democratic Commissioner in the SEC and would vacate his position next year in June 2020. Senate Minority Leader and Democratic Leader Chuck Schumer has sent Crenshaw's name to the White House as a nominee for the post of the new Commissioner of the United States Securities and Exchange Commission from the Democratic taking over Jackson, who is also a Democrat.

Insider Trading

Jackson commissioned a panel to reform insider trading laws with former US Attorney Preet Bharara, arguing that the US lacks a law that expressly bans insider trading, and instead, “the government brings insider-trading cases under a Depression-era law that generally prohibits ‘fraud’ in the securities markets. As a result, what we now understand as the laws against insider trading have been written by federal judges...the result is a legal haziness...”

Buybacks

Jackson has spoken out against corporate executives who cash-out on stock buybacks and called on the SEC to revise its outdated rules in this area. He was called upon by Senator Chris Van Hollen to provide empirical research into the effects of corporate stock buybacks, to which Jackson responded with evidence that when executives sell into buybacks, companies perform worse over the long-term.

Indexes

Together with Professor Steven Davidoff Solomon of UC Berkeley, Jackson called for the SEC to investigate index fund structure and accountability. In their joint NYT op-ed, the two argue that “indexes face little regulatory scrutiny and can face significant conflicts of interest, which have the potential to harm American investors,” and cite a Wall Street Journal report that MSCI was pressured by the Chinese government into adding Chinese issuers to its emerging market index.

Dual Class

In a speech, Jackson described perpetual dual-class stock arrangements that keep founders and their heirs in control of a company forever a form of “corporate royalty,” and called for national securities exchanges to consider proposed listing standards addressing the use of perpetual dual-class stock. He also cited analysis showing that “several years out from their IPOs, firms with perpetual dual-class stock trade at a significant discount to those with sunset provisions.”

IPO Tax

The "middle-market IPO tax" refers to the seven-percent fee investment banks have charged middle-market firms to go public, with little variation, since the 1990s. Jackson has spoken on its role in firms increasingly staying private, citing analysis that over 96% of recent midsized IPOs featured a spread of exactly 7% and arguing that this is too high for public markets to be competitive compared to private markets.

Mandatory Arbitration

Jackson has spoken against mandatory arbitration, calling shareholder suits a principal way in which we hold corporate managers to account when they hurt investors and arguing that mandatory arbitration “deprive[s] the public of the law our judges make when they hold corporate insiders accountable to investors.”

Cyber Disclosure

Jackson has been outspoken on the issue of requiring companies to disclose cyber-breaches, specifically noting the opportunity that it gives executives for insider trading and the larger role that counsel and c-suites should play in security and disclosure. He has also released analysis showing that “about 90% of known cyber incidents at public companies went undisclosed in regulatory filings in 2018…down from 97% in 2017.”

Exchanges

Jackson has criticized stock exchanges for having tiered systems for ordinary investors and wealthier investors to get prices and information, calling it a form of rent extraction and a tax on ordinary investors. He argues that the SEC's exchange rules were created for not-for-profit exchanges, but now that most exchanges are for-profit, this is no longer a suitable approach. He called for “greater transparency about how exchanges make their money…[and] a clear and uniform approach to disclosing revenues across exchanges and over time.”

== Personal life ==
Jackson was born in the Bronx to Maureen A. Jackson a retired teacher from the Blind Brook School District and Robert Jackson Sr a retired Chief Accounting Officer at Scholastic. Jackson is a fan of the New York Yankees. He attended Blind Brook High School. At his SEC nomination hearing, he told the story of his parents—his father working as an accounting clerk at an encyclopedia company and his mother holding part-time jobs to make ends meet, but their savings in the American stock market allowed him to attend college. He married his wife Bryana Lauren Turner, a family conflict lawyer, at their Manhattan apartment in 2019, officiated by his brother in-law.
