= Schmehl =

Schmehl is a surname. Notable people with the surname include:

- Carl Schmehl (born 1968), American theatre director and producer
- Jeffrey L. Schmehl (born 1955), American judge

== See also ==
- Schmehl Peak, a mountain of Oates Land, Antarctica
