= Port Chester Public Schools =

School district in the U.S. state of New York

Port Chester Public Schools, officially known as the Port Chester-Rye Union Free School District, is a school district headquartered in Port Chester, New York.

The district is located within portions of the Town of Rye. All of Port Chester is in the district. About 30% of the village of Rye Brook is in the district, and the remainder is in the Blind Brook School District.

== Demographics ==
As of October 2014, the district had 4,517 students.

== Schools ==
The district has four elementary schools, one middle school, and one high school.

Secondary schools:

- Port Chester High School

Port Chester High School houses grades 9–12, with 1,576 students in 2015–2016.

The students in Port Chester High School select from a range of options including honors, Advanced Placement and International Baccalaureate courses, a full complement of academic, art and music courses, and a broad range of extracurricular activities. Over 95% of graduates are college bound each year.

Co-Curricular and Athletic Activities: A range of clubs is available and is designed to meet students’ school-related interests and needs, including art, choir, theater, journalism, and student government. About one-third of students participate in at least one sport through a full interscholastic boys and girls sports program at the modified, junior and varsity levels. Port Chester High School's Marching Band has appeared in the movies Spider-Man 3 and Miracle on 34th Street (1994 film) and has performed in the 2003 Orange Bowl as well as the Disney World Festival of Lights. The band also participated in the 1997 Macy's Thanksgiving Day Parade.

- Port Chester Middle School

A National Blue Ribbon School of Excellence serving about 1,000 students in grades 6–8 in 2014–2015, where students are organized into “teams” each with its own team of faculty members.

PCMS offers foreign language instruction, physical science instruction taught in the school's Planetarium, hands-on experimental science courses and accelerated English, math and science strands for gifted students.

The school has a bi-annual exchange program with a middle school near Madrid, Spain. Character education and community service projects play a significant role in the life of students.

Extracurricular activities include sports teams, band, orchestra, choral groups, drama, astronomy and other clubs and groups. An after school program provides enrichment and academic support.

Port Chester has a comprehensive middle-school focused transition program from grade 5 to grade 6 and again from grade 8 to grade 9.

- Primary schools

Port Chester has four elementary schools. Each school serves students in grade K-5 with a total elementary population of 2,160 students in 2014–2015. The district has full day Kindergarten. Students are assigned to elementary schools by neighborhood zones.

- Thomas A. Edison School, 426 students (2014), is a National School of Character
- John F. Kennedy (JFK) Magnet School, 903 students (2014) in 3 separate buildings, is a National Blue Ribbon School with a math, science and technology focus. It offers a comprehensive bilingual program to its students
- King Street School, 412 students (2014), was recognized as a High Performing/Gap Closing School by the NY State Education Department
- Park Avenue School, 419 students (2014), offers a K-5 dual language program as an option for entering Kindergarten students
