= Blind Brook High School =

Location
- 840 King Street; Rye Brook, (Westchester County), New York 10573; United States; 41°01′54″N 73°40′27″W

Information
- School type: Public, high school
- Established: 1973
- School district: Blind Brook School District
- NCES District ID: 3624630
- CEEB code: 334577
- NCES School ID: 362463003350
- Principal: Mark Greenwald
- Teaching staff: 36.01 (FTE)
- Grades: 9-12
- Gender: Co-ed
- Enrollment: 538 (2019–20)
- Student to teacher ratio: 13.83
- Language: English, Italian, Latin, Spanish
- Colors: Blue and white
- Athletics conference: Section 1 (NYSPHSAA), Class "B"
- Mascot: Trojan Warrior
- Team name: The Trojans
- Newspaper: FOCUS
- Yearbook: Spectrum
- School TV channel: BBTV Ch.77 (Cablevision), 27 (Verizon FIOS)
- Website: bbhs.blindbrook.org

Blind Brook High School (BBHS) is a public, four-year secondary school in Rye Brook, New York, United States. It is the only public high school that serves the Blind Brook School District. BBHS is a relatively small high school; the Class of 2025 was made up of 100 students. The principal is Sharon Flynn.

== History ==
=== Beginnings ===
Blind Brook High School opened its doors in the fall of 1973. The construction of the Blind Brook School District's first high school came about after the community (which was the unincorporated area of the Town of Rye at the time) wanted to expand the local school district, District #5. This push for expansion started after the community became frustrated about spending much money to send their children to local high schools including Port Chester, Mamaroneck, Rye Neck, and Valhalla, without commensurate representation or influence on those districts' policies and programs. In addition, the Ridge Street School, which housed classes from kindergarten to 8th/9th grades, was becoming overcrowded and could not accommodate the growing population that would become known as Rye Brook (in 1982). Land was purchased on King Street, and construction was started in 1972 and ended in late 1973, months into the school year. The high school today stands on the same campus as in 1973.

=== 1973-2003 ===
In the fall of 1973, Blind Brook opened its doors, with David Schein as its first principal. Construction was ongoing in the new building during the first months of the school year.

The original building was considered modern as it contained "open classrooms". This setup contained classrooms that had movable walls and/or book cases separating them. This made for an interesting and different learning environment since students walking in hallways would also be walking behind classes.

Since the school officially opened in 1973 with Grades 7–10, Blind Brook's first graduating class was the Class of 1975, a class made up of only four advanced students, with the graduation taking place in the middle of the school year, at the conclusion of the first semester.

1997 brought the arrival of Principal Robert Chlebicki, who would hold the position until 2003. During his tenure at Blind Brook, Chlebicki helped Blind Brook move into the 21st century in many areas. In 1999, with the construction of Bellefair, a new housing development, and the influx of younger families to the community, the Blind Brook community started to outgrow the footprint of the original high school building. Further, after spending several years at the Ridge Street building, as Blind Brook grew into a 9-12 high school, the seventh and eighth grades were reintroduced back at the Blind Brook campus, adding to the crowded conditions. A parent-school district committee, called "Let's Bond for our Kids", formed a construction plan and encouraged the community to get involved and vote for funding to build a separate middle school wing. The bond passed by a large margin, bringing construction to the BB campus for the first time since 1973.

In the summer of 2000, Portables 1 and 2 were installed to create additional classroom space during the construction.

With administrative change occurring, the construction project progressed. The project ultimately resulted in a middle school wing, a middle school gymnasium, a renovated Instructional Media Center (library), new middle school and high school main offices, a 450-seat auditorium, a new front walkway and entrance, a renovated commons area, and high school classroom renovation. In addition to expansion of the building, in order to meet state fire codes, the construction also resulted in traditional, four-walled, closed classrooms. By removing wall-less classrooms, the new classroom setup left some interior rooms windowless. In addition, the Commons had its carpet removed and new, artistic walls were installed. These walls were often poked fun at and seemed very silly in the eyes of students, with statements of "This is a school, not an art museum!" pushing a backlash against the walls. Many wanted the walls removed, though that wouldn't happen until Blind Brook went through a second wave of construction. The new auditorium was also criticized as it was too small and could not fit the entire high school and its faculty in the facility at the same time. In addition, the end-of-the-year graduation would not be able to be held in the new facility as it lacked necessary seating for guests. Graduations are held in the gym as it can accommodate the larger number of guests.

2002-2003 brought much more change to Blind Brook High School. A new look, some new technology, and several new "traditions" changed the style of the culture throughout the school's new halls. A (non-merged) football team, albeit at the junior varsity level, was created, after a long absence of any type of recreational football. The team was originally made up of 25 students, and practiced at Ridge Street School.

Parking issues at the then-IBM building between the high school and the building's owners continued, resulting in tense negotiations between the two groups.

Three International Baccalaureate classes (12th grade English, 11th grade Chemistry, and Theory of Knowledge) were added in order to create a more difficult and challenging baccalaureate curriculum, though after months of discussion and debate, the Board of Education voted 4 to 1 against the continuation of the program in March 2003.

The end of the school year also brought the resignations of Blind Brook's top administrators, long-time principal Robert Chlebicki, leaving a sense of uncertainty in the Blind Brook community. Chlebicki left Blind Brook for the North Shore School District on Long Island to become the Assistant Superintendent for Instruction.

=== 2004-present ===
Blind Brook's administration was still up in the air in the 2003–2004 school year, as an interim principal was hired while the search for a new principal continued. Anthony Baxter was hired for the positions of principal.

Blind Brook's future curriculum plans were also in limbo after the International Baccalaureate plan was rejected. A new strategy was put into action by the Board of Education to investigate the AP program and to see if it would be a good fit for BBHS. From 2004 to 2006, Blind Brook added numerous AP classes to its class offerings. In addition to new AP classes, Blind Brook, in the 2005–06 school year, also added Latin as an elective.

In early 2005, the Blind Brook community was once again outgrowing the High School building. This gave school officials no other choice than expand onto the high school building once again. A bond vote was conducted and passed by a high percentage. With this bond passed, construction returned to the Blind Brook campus for the second time in only five years.

Construction, however, did not start until late 2005, around October, because of problems with architectural plans and a slow permit approval by the New York State Education Department. In the 2005-06 phase of construction, a new middle school cafeteria, fitness center, science labs, HS and MS classrooms, and new athletic fields were built.

Problems arose when students became concerned with the future of the Rock, a tradition Blind Brook students take part in every year as the senior class paints it. The problem was fixed as the rock was moved out of harm's way.

A significant retaining wall malfunction delayed the construction of the soccer/football field, as it had to be rebuilt. The manufacturer said that the wrong type of stones had been chosen for the wall, meaning all retaining walls on the campus had to be taken down and rebuilt. This set the field projects back several months. The wall was finally completed in October 2006. The company which installed the wall and provided the stones paid for the damages. The upper field contains an artificial turf baseball field and the lower contains a six-lane track and an artificial turf lacrosse/soccer/football field. Because of the new field space, girls' lacrosse was started in 2007 at the JV level. The baseball field, complete with stands, backstop, and sliding-dirt cutouts, was completed in mid-October 2006, while the soccer/football field wasn't complete until the spring of 2007, and the track wasn't complete until July 2007.

The Village of Rye Brook, New York, at the same time, was building their fields adjacent to the BBHS campus. These fields contain a softball field and a soccer/football field.

It was announced in the spring of 2007 that Anthony Baxter would not be returning to Blind Brook for the 2007–08 school year. The Board of Education hired William Stark in June 2007 as the interim principal until a permanent replacement was found.

In the summer of 2007, Blind Brook was the site of the 2007 Empire State Games men's soccer matches, which helped further show the community the new and state-of-the-art facilities Blind Brook had to offer.

At the 2008 graduation ceremonies, the Board of Education President announced that the IMC would be renamed the Monroe E. Haas Library and IMC, in honor of the outgoing board member.

On April 16, 2008, it was announced that Scott Bersin, who had been the assistant principal at Great Neck High School North on Long Island, had been hired as the school's new principal effective July 1, 2008. However, Bersin only served one year of his three-year probationary appointment. At a special meeting held on Tuesday, June 2, 2009, the Board of Education accepted Bersin's resignation, making him the third principal to resign in six years.

Bersin's resignation produced a great deal of controversy, according to newspaper reports. Vincent Galasso, the former science coordinator for the middle school and high school, was appointed as an interim principal as of July 1, 2009.

On July 1, 2010, Gina Healey became the sixth principal of Blind Brook High School in seven years.

In 2018, high school principal Patricia Lambert returned to her prior role as the middle school principal.

== Academics ==
Blind Brook High School is known for its strong educational program. In 2010, U.S. News & World Report ranked Blind Brook #55 in its list of best high schools in the country, up from 85 in 2009, placing Blind Brook on its Gold Medal List for the second year in a row.

In 2008, Blind Brook, along with other high schools across the United States, asked Newsweek magazine to be left off the magazine's controversial rankings. Blind Brook signed a letter to Newsweek saying that it didn't want to be on a list that ranks high schools based on the ratio of students who take advanced-placement exams. Previously, Blind Brook had been placed 89th on Newsweek magazine's Top 100 Schools list in 2006, and 94th in 2007.

BBHS has expanded its Advanced Placement program. In 1999–2000, seven AP courses were offered. As of 2007, BBHS offered 14 AP courses in addition to high-school-level regents classes. BBHS was the home to a regional BOCES program for hearing impaired students. However the program concluded at the end of the 2014–2015 school year.

== Extracurricular activities ==
Blind Brook has many activities and clubs that students can take part in during Activity Period and after school. In recent years, these clubs and teams have been recognized as top performers in their fields. Clubs range from academic teams to community groups to the arts. In 2007–08, clubs were moved from Activity Period to after-school, after formal complaints by the BBHS Congress and students. As a result of their moving, new procedures concerning clubs were established. These procedures require that both new and pre-existing clubs submit a complete list of members in order to obtain a one-year charter allowing them to operate.

=== Student-produced media ===
Blind Brook's FOCUS is a newspaper. It has won the Columbia Scholastic Press Association's gold medal. The paper is produced in-house by the students and faculty adviser.

What was first known as the Underground Literary Magazine in the early 1980s, is Blind Brook's student-produced literary magazine, Impulse. This magazine is popular for its short stories, poems, and art.

In addition to print, Blind Brook operates a cable television station through BBTV, the school's video club. This club produces original programming for the station and helps run the station.

=== Community service-based clubs ===
Blind Brook students are well known for their commitment and enthusiasm towards improving the community, and often surpass the 80 hours required to graduate. In order to expand the community service opportunities, the Blind Brook Community Service Club organizes events with senior citizen centers, holds fundraisers, and has established a pen pal program with a local elementary school. The Blind Brook Soup Kitchen is a weekly soup kitchen run by Blind Brook students since its establishment in 1998. It serves the Port Chester community by serving meals to the needy and less fortunate. In 2001, Blind Brook's Habitat for Humanity chapter was created. The club has worked on numerous construction sites helping build homes, clean up debris, and paint churches.

== Athletics ==
Blind Brook is in Section 1, Class "C" for athletics.

=== State championships ===
Soccer

- 1980 NY State Class "C" Boys' Soccer Champions
- 1978 NY State Class "C" Boys' Soccer Champions

Basketball

- 2004 NY State Class "C" Boys' Basketball Champions
- 2002 NY State Class "C" Boys' Basketball Champions

=== Teams ===
Athletic teams at Blind Brook MS/HS
Sport	Level	Season	Gender
Cross-Country	V, JV, F (all under one coach)	Fall	Co-ed
Football	V	Fall	Boys'
Field hockey	No longer offered, last offered in the late 1970s		
Soccer	V, JV, Mod	Fall	Boys', girls'
Girls' Tennis	V, JV, Mod	Fall	Girls'
Volleyball	V, JV, Mod	Fall	Girls'
Cheerleading	V	Fall, Winter	Co-ed
Girls' Swimming	V	Fall	Girls': Merged program with Rye High School
Basketball	V, JV, 9th grade, 8th grade, 7th grade	Winter	Boys', girls'
Gymnastics	No longer offered, last offered in 2007-08: A merger between Rye, Port Chester, and Blind Brook High Schools. Dissolved in 2008–09.		
Ice hockey	V	Winter	Boys': Merged program with Harrison and Rye Neck
Boys' Swimming*	V	Winter	Boys': Merged program with Rye and Rye Neck
Ski	V	Winter	Co-ed: Merged with Rye Neck
Track	V, Mod	Spring	Co-ed
Wrestling	V	Winter	Boys': Merged program with Rye
Baseball	V, JV, F, 8th grade, 7th grade	Spring	Boys'
Softball	V, JV, 8th/7th grade	Spring	Girls'
Boys' Tennis	V, JV, Mod	Spring	Boys'
Lacrosse	JV	Spring	Girls'
Golf	V	Spring	Co-ed
Step Team	V	Winter	Girls
Dance Team	V	Winter	Girls

V = Varsity, VB = Varsity B, JV = Junior Varsity, F = Freshmen, Mod = Modified
N/I = need information, – = not applicable
