= Port Chester, New York =

- Village
- Incorporated Village of Port Chester
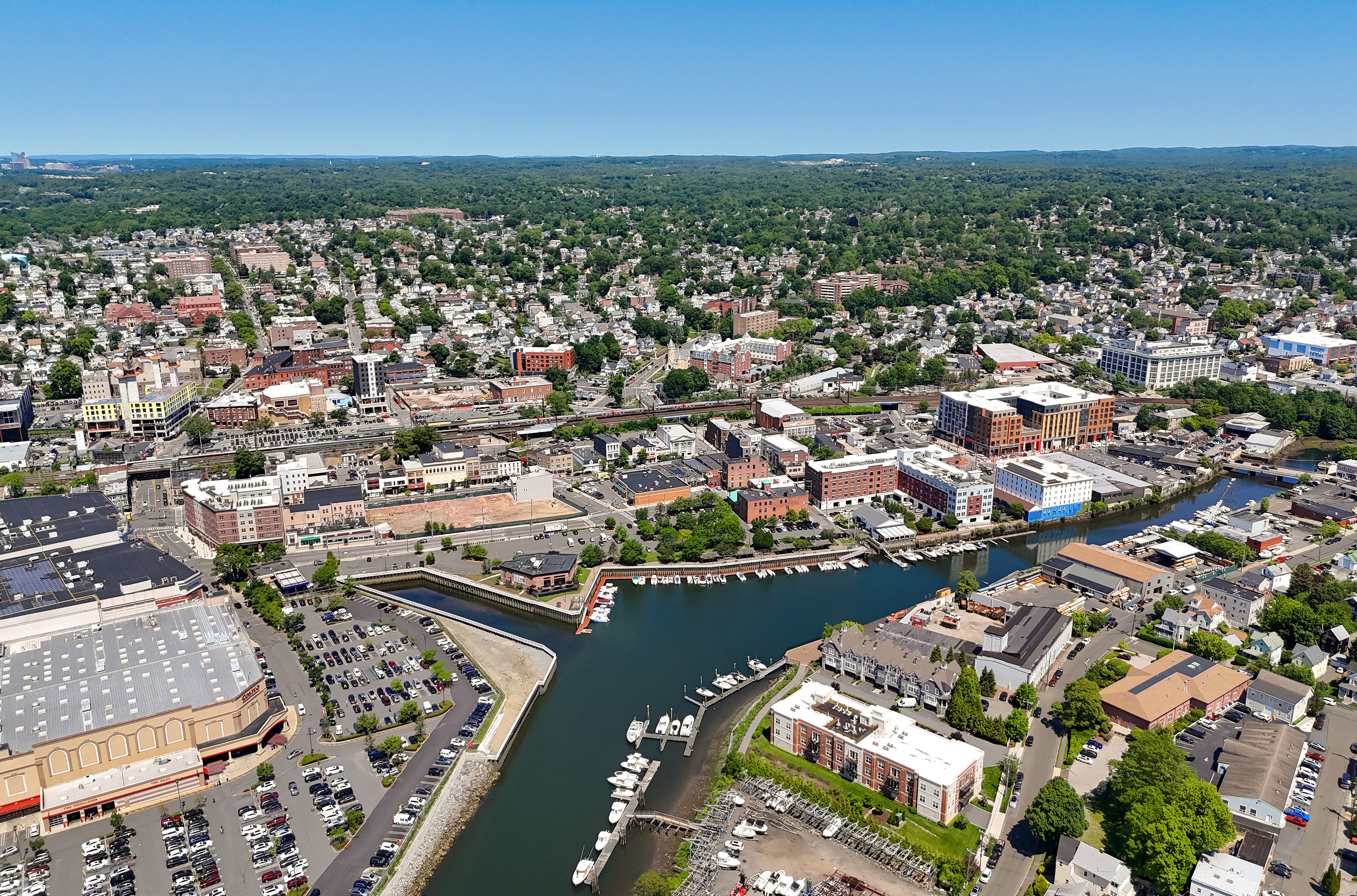
- Downtown Port Chester

- Flag Seal
- Nickname: Gateway To New England
- Motto: "Rich History, Great Future"
- Location in Westchester County, New York

- Location within the United States
- Coordinates: 41°0′18″N 73°40′8″W
- Country: United States
- State: New York
- County: Westchester
- Town: Rye

Government
  - Mayor: Luis A. Marino
  - Board of Trustees: Philip Dorazio; Richard Abel; John Allen; Sylvia Dundon; George Ford; Nancy F. Naulaguari
  - Village Manager: Stuart L. Rabin

Area
  - Total: 2.40 sq mi (6.22 km^{2})
  - Land: 2.33 sq mi (6.03 km^{2})
  - Water: 0.073 sq mi (0.19 km^{2})
- Elevation: 43 ft (13 m)

Population (2020)
  - Total: 31,693
  - Density: 13,612.9/sq mi (5,255.96/km^{2})
- Demonym: Port Chesterian
- Time zone: UTC−5 (Eastern (EST))
  - Summer (DST): UTC−4 (EDT)
- ZIP Code: 10573
- Area code: 914
- FIPS code: 36-59223
- GNIS feature ID: 0977392
- Website: portchesterny.gov

Port Chester is a village in the U.S. state of New York and the largest part of the town of Rye in Westchester County by population. As of the 2020 census, Port Chester had a population of 31,693. Port Chester is part of the New York City metropolitan statistical area. Located in southeast Westchester County, Port Chester borders Connecticut and the town of Greenwich to the east. It is one of only 12 villages in New York still incorporated under a charter; other villages either incorporated or reincorporated under the provisions of Village Law.

The village of Port Chester is nicknamed the "Gateway to New England" and serves as a transportation hub between New Englanders and New York. Its economy is primarily stimulated by small businesses, the local government and several national chain stores.

== Names ==
The Wappinger people called the land on which the village was founded "Haseco", meaning "marshy land" or "marshy hassock". Upon colonial settlement, the area became known as Saw Pit (or Sawpits) for the saw pits in use during the time. Logs were cut in holes in the ground for wood to be used for homesteading. The name Saw Pit was used for the first time in 1732. The village outgrew this name and became Port Chester by incorporating as a village in 1868.

== History ==
In 1660, three settlers from Greenwidge (now Greenwich, Connecticut)—Thomas Studwell, John Coe, and Peter Disbrow—arranged to buy Manursing Island and the land near the Byram River from the Native Americans. This First Purchase on Peningo Neck comprised the lower part of the present town of Rye, on the east side of Blind Brook. Over the next decade, additional purchases filled in the shoreline from Rye to Greenwich, made via land agreements with the Native Americans in the area.

These Native Americans' tribal affiliation has been debated. They may have been small, independent families or tribes, or subgroups of larger tribes in the area. What is documented is the names of the natives who signed land agreements. Their names were written by the English, using their semi-skilled interpretation of the phonetics. In spite of the English phonetic variations, the land records still existent were clearly signed by the same people:

- Shawanórõckquot, a.k.a. Shanarockwell, aka Shanarocke (and other variations)
- Cockho, a.k.a. Cokow, Cokeo (and other variations)
- Cockinsecawa, a.k.a. Cokinseco, Cockenseco (and other variations)
- Kamaque, a.k.a. Quaraiko, Rawmanquaie (and other variations)
- Mehúmõw, a.k.a. Maowbert

Shanarocke was referred to by the others as their leader, or "sachem". These elder tribe members or "sagamores" made many of the tribal decisions, and there were several instances where agreements could not be signed because he was not present. Shanarocke was a Wiechquaeskeck Native American. Wiechquaskeck settlements were well-documented in shore areas from present-day Pelham to the Byram or "Armonk" river on the Connecticut state line. Shanarocke is specifically named a "Wiechquaskeck sachem" or titled "Sachem of Poningoe" on deeds that include parts of the Bronx and Harlem River area, as well as parts of Queens and Nassau County.

No Indian name more frequently occurs in the history of the county than that of Wechquaesgeek, nor one the precise location of which there is more difficulty in determining. O'Callaghan says: 'This tract is described as extending from the Hudson to the East river. The name is from wigwos, birch bark, and keag, country—'the country of the birch bark.' Bolton gives the name to an Indian village which occupied the site of Dobbs' ferry, which he denominates 'the place of the bark kettle.' In Albany Records, III, 379, is this entry: 'Personally appeared Sauwenare, sachem of Wieckqueskeck, Amenameck his brother, and others, all owners, etc., of lands situated on North river called Wieckquaeskeck, and declared that they had sold the same to Wouter Van Twiller in 1645"

Wechqueskeck is not the name of a particular Native American tribe but the name applied to the territorial jurisdiction of a clan of Indians in Westchester County whose principal village was on the headwaters or tributaries of Armonck or Byram's River. The later treaties at West Farms and Hunts Point, where Shanarocke is labeled "Sachem of Rye", hint at his tribal affiliation. On that agreement are also the sachems of the Reckgawawancs.

As of the 21st century, researchers are identifying affiliations with the Wappinger, Lenape, Mohawk, Mohegan, and other Westchester County natives. Native Americans continued to live in Sawpit until the "white man" declared their presence a "nuisance".

The Saw Pit area remained largely untouched until Revolutionary times except for a few farms in the hills above the Byram River and a few taverns along the trail that became the Boston Post Road. Although Rye and Saw Pit were created within Fairfield County, Connecticut, the King of England gave the Duke of York large territories west of present-day Connecticut, forming the New York Colony in 1683.

The controversy of divided loyalties to the King and the Duke continued for 105 years. In 1788, the Legislature of New York ruled that Saw Pit was a part of the town of Rye, New York. Families from Rye and Greenwich began to settle the Saw Pit area just before the Revolution, but even as late as 1800 there were only a handful of established homesteads.

Early roads in the area grew from native trails. The Boston Post Road, King Street, and Grace Church streets are some of the early migration paths in the Saw Pit/Rye settlement. Water transportation was equally important. The local waterways (the Byram River and Long Island Sound) were a key part of the growth and development of Saw Pit/Port Chester. Early residents took part in farming and fishing. After the Revolution, the harbor area became a shipbuilding site, with the Lyon family operating a considerable shipyard that produced some of the best sloops and seafaring fishing vessels. By the time the village of Saw Pit incorporated as Port Chester, it was considered a major seaport.

The Byram river provided a decent harbor, which became a factor in the industrialization of Port Chester at the beginning of the 19th century. The railroad's arrival in 1849 turned Port Chester into a destination for manufacturing and wealthy NYC families, with hotels, theaters, and large estates. These exclusive properties included some of the East Coast's grandest mansions, but slowly gave way to the crushing need for housing. Successive waves of immigrants from Germany, Ireland, and Italy each brought industry and prosperity as the village grew.

Steamships regularly sailed from Port Chester to New York City from 1870 until the First World War. The last two decades of the 19th century saw public services expand, and roads were widened and paved in the 1920s. Over 5,000 men from Port Chester served in the First and Second World Wars. After the Second World War, numerous corporations established headquarters or production centers in Port Chester. Examples include Life Savers, whose former factory is now a residential building, evidence of Port Chester's progression from an industrial center to a suburban residential municipality.

On June 30, 1974, a nightclub fire killed 24 people. The Gulliver's nightclub fire was the deadliest dance club fire in the U.S. in more than a generation (the November 28, 1942, Cocoanut Grove fire in Boston killed 491), and called attention to the dangers of herding young people into windowless underground rooms without smoke alarms, sprinklers, fire-resistant walls, or occupancy limits.

Despite the fire, there was no comprehensive New York State Fire Code reform until the 1980s. Fire code enforcement remains a top priority in Port Chester.

In 1999, the village of Port Chester established a "redevelopment area" and relegated regulatory authority in that area to private developer Gregory Wasser from G&S Port Chester, LLC, including power to condemn private property. The decision spawned several lawsuits, including Brody v. Village of Port Chester, Edward Eways v. Village of Port Chester, and Didden v. Village of Port Chester.

In the late 20th and early 21st century, Port Chester underwent several redevelopment proposals and projects. The Port Chester Historical Society is dedicated to learning and teaching the public about Port Chester's history.

== Geography ==
According to the United States Census Bureau, the village has an area of 2.4 square miles (6.2 km^{2}), of which 2.33 square miles (6.0 km^{2}) is land and 0.07 square miles (0.18 km^{2}), is water.

Port Chester has a humid subtropical climate (Cfa). Due to its location on the coast, temperatures are neither extremely cold nor warm, and precipitation is plentiful for the entire year. Winters are usually cool (around 4 °C [39 °F]), and powerful nor'easters can occur, sometimes dropping large amounts of rain and snow on the village. Average annual snowfall is 76 centimeters (29.8 inches), significantly more than New York City's 64 centimeters (25.3 inches) Snow cover is sporadic as the sea moderates temperatures, which melt snow. During the summer, Port Chester is typically warm, but far cooler than towns even a few miles inland, due to the sea's influence.

Climate data for Port Chester, New York
Month	Jan	Feb	Mar	Apr	May	Jun	Jul	Aug	Sep	Oct	Nov	Dec	Year
Mean daily maximum °F (°C)	39 (4)	40 (4)	51 (11)	60 (16)	73 (23)	79 (26)	83 (28)	82 (28)	74 (23)	62 (17)	55 (13)	43 (6)	61 (16)
Mean daily minimum °F (°C)	29 (−2)	30 (−1)	35 (2)	45 (7)	52 (11)	63 (17)	68 (20)	66 (19)	60 (16)	49 (9)	40 (4)	32 (0)	47 (8)

== Demographics ==
Historical population
Census	Pop.	Note	%±
1870	3,797		—
1880	3,254		−14.3%
1890	5,274		62.1%
1900	7,440		41.1%
1910	12,809		72.2%
1920	16,573		29.4%
1930	22,662		36.7%
1940	23,073		1.8%
1950	23,970		3.9%
1960	24,960		4.1%
1970	25,803		3.4%
1980	23,565		−8.7%
1990	24,728		4.9%
2000	27,867		12.7%
2010	28,967		3.9%
2020	31,693		9.4%
U.S. Decennial Census

=== 2020 census ===
As of the 2020 census, Port Chester had a population of 31,693. The median age was 37.1 years. 23.1% of residents were under the age of 18 and 12.8% of residents were 65 years of age or older. For every 100 females there were 101.1 males, and for every 100 females age 18 and over there were 100.5 males age 18 and over.

100.0% of residents lived in urban areas, while 0.0% lived in rural areas.

There were 10,599 households in Port Chester, of which 37.7% had children under the age of 18 living in them. Of all households, 45.2% were married-couple households, 20.0% were households with a male householder and no spouse or partner present, and 28.5% were households with a female householder and no spouse or partner present. About 24.0% of all households were made up of individuals and 10.2% had someone living alone who was 65 years of age or older.

There were 11,054 housing units, of which 4.1% were vacant. The homeowner vacancy rate was 1.0% and the rental vacancy rate was 2.5%.

Racial composition as of the 2020 census
Race	Number	Percent
White	10,164	32.1%
Black or African American	1,493	4.7%
American Indian and Alaska Native	613	1.9%
Asian	741	2.3%
Native Hawaiian and Other Pacific Islander	7	0.0%
Some other race	12,995	41.0%
Two or more races	5,680	17.9%
Hispanic or Latino (of any race)	20,679	65.2%

=== Demographic estimates ===
At the 2019 American Community Survey, the racial and ethnic makeup of Port Chester was 30.6% non-Hispanic White, 3.0% Black or African American, 1.7% Asian, 0.3% some other race, 0.3% two or more races, and 63.9% Hispanic or Latin American of any race. Of the Hispanic and Latino population, the largest single group were Mexican Americans (14.4%) and other Hispanics and Latin Americans made up 45.0% of the demographic. At the 2020 American Community Survey, the Latino population was 14.1% Mexican, 11.8% Guatemalan, 10.3% Ecuadorian, 7.3% Peruvian, 3.7% Dominican, 3.4% Colombian.

=== 2010 census ===
At the 2010 census, there were 28,967 people, 9,240 households, and 6,348 families residing in the village. The population density was 11,722.5 inhabitants per square mile (4,526.1/km^{2}). There were 10,046 housing units at an average density of 4,185.8 units per square mile (1,616.1 units/km^{2}). The racial makeup of the village was 31.6% White, 5.3% African American, 0.2% Native American, 2.0% Asian, 0.0% Pacific Islander, 0.7% some other race, and 0.9% from two or more races. Hispanic or Latino of any race were 59.4% of the population.

There were 9,240 households, out of which 33.9% had children under the age of 18 living with them, 46.5% were headed by married couples living together, 14.3% had a female householder with no husband present, and 31.3% were non-families. 24.2% of all households were made up of individuals, and 10.0% had someone living alone who was 65 years of age or older. The average household size was 3.08 and the average family size was 3.54.

In the village the population was spread out, with 22.6% under the age of 18, 9.6% from 18 to 24, 34.2% from 25 to 44, 22.7% from 45 to 64, and 10.6% who were 65 years of age or older. The median age was 34.4 years. For every 100 females, there were 110.3 males. For every 100 females age 18 and over, there were 111.4 males.

=== 2000 census ===
At the 2000 U.S. census, the median income for a household in the village was $45,381, and the median income for a family was $51,025. Males had a median income of $32,848 versus $32,461 for females. About 10.1% of families and 13.0% of the population were below the poverty line, including 15.3% of those under age 18 and 12.6% of those age 65 or over.

=== Income and poverty ===
In 2019, the median income for a household in Port Chester was $74,920 and the mean income was $99,001.

Port Chester contains a more diverse, working-class population than many of its surrounding communities.

=== Religion ===
The population of Port Chester is also a relatively religious suburban community in Downstate New York. The largest religious group in the village and area is Christianity, dominated by the Roman Catholic Church (47%). Of the Christian community, the second largest group operating in the village is the United Methodist Church (1.8%) and the third largest were Baptists (1.7%). The second largest religion in Port Chester was Judaism as of 2021 (5.2%), and Islam was the third largest single religious group (1.5%).

== Economy ==
The Life Savers Candy Company operated a factory in Port Chester from 1920 until 1984. The factory building, which now contains apartments, is one of Port Chester's prominent landmarks. National Collector's Mint was headquartered in Port Chester, and Port Chester was the home of the chili restaurant Pat's Hubba Hubba (also known as "Hubba's").

=== Business ===
- American Automotive Equipment (1969)

== Education ==
Within the village's borders, there is one public school district, the Port Chester-Rye Union Free School District. Established in 1884, it Westchester County's oldest school district. Two schools in Port Chester are Port Chester Middle and Port Chester High School.

The Westchester Fairfield Hebrew Academy (now Carmel Academy) opened in Port Chester in 1997, in rented space. It has since moved out of town.

The Japanese Weekend School of New York, a hoshū jugyō kō (Japanese weekend school), holds classes at Port Chester Middle School. As of 2006, the school had about 800 students, including Japanese citizens and Japanese Americans, at locations in Westchester County and Long Island.

== Neighborhoods ==
- Edgewood
- Traphagen
- Willett Estates

== Arts and culture ==
The Port Chester-Rye Brook Public Library is an association library funded by and for the villages of Port Chester and Rye Brook. The library was founded in 1876 by Jared V. Peck and was dedicated at its present location in 1926 at the intersection of Haseco and Westchester Avenues. Three major renovations have taken place, in 1967, 2007, and 2012. The latest renovation included the creation of a teen room, a multipurpose meeting room, the addition of new furniture and carpets, and the relocation of the children's room and the implementation of an elevator. Although the renovation did not add square footage to the original three-story, 18,900-square-foot building, it provided a more open design, with better use of space and light to promote parent and child reading activities. The 2012 renovations, which cost $1 million, were paid for with the bequest of Douglas and Elise Lefferts. According to 2011 records, 19,900 people hold library cards and 10,221 people attended programs including GED and community interest classes. The summer reading program typically draws 13,000 children.

Another notable cultural landmark in Port Chester is the Capitol Theatre, a music venue that has hosted bands and artists such as The Grateful Dead, Janis Joplin, The Rolling Stones, David Bowie, Bob Dylan, and The Ramones. Jerry Garcia of The Grateful Dead said, "There's only two theaters, man... that are set up pretty groovy all around for music and for smooth stage changes, good lighting and all that—the Fillmore [in Silver Spring, Maryland] and The Capitol Theatre." Because of Garcia's fondness for the theatre, a section of Port Chester has Grateful Dead-themed adornments on sidewalks and telephone poles and in local businesses. Joplin also wrote her song "Mercedes Benz" outside the Capitol Theatre.

St. Frances African Methodist Episcopal (AME) Zion Church was founded in 1849. For years, it was the only church serving people of color in the area, including the communities of Mamaroneck and New Rochelle. Many members have been local leaders of the NAACP. The church is closely associated with the historic Rye African-American Cemetery, where many members of the congregation have been buried. Both the church and the cemetery are now tour stops on the African American Heritage Trail of Westchester County.

== Government and politics ==
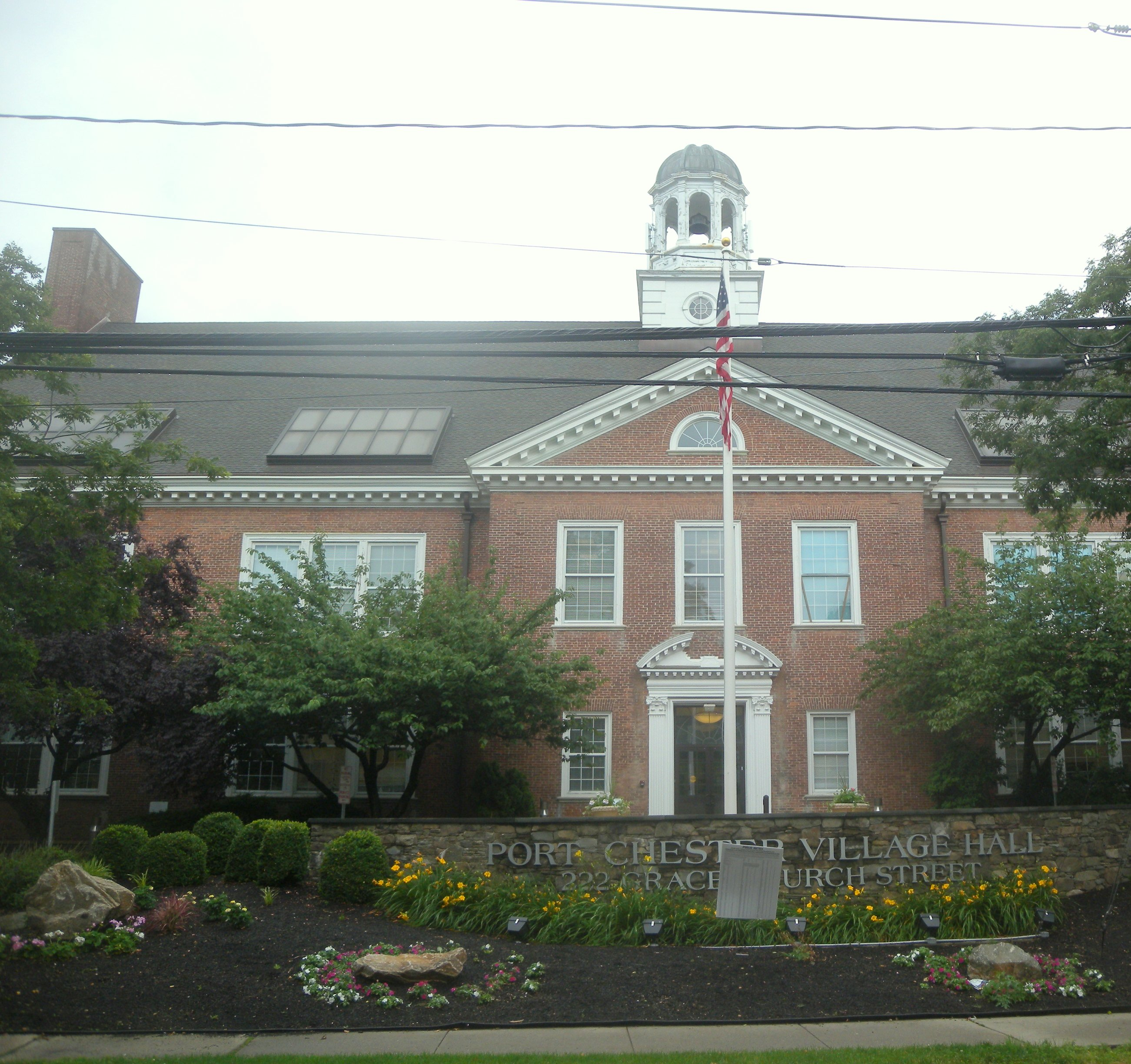
Port Chester Village Hall

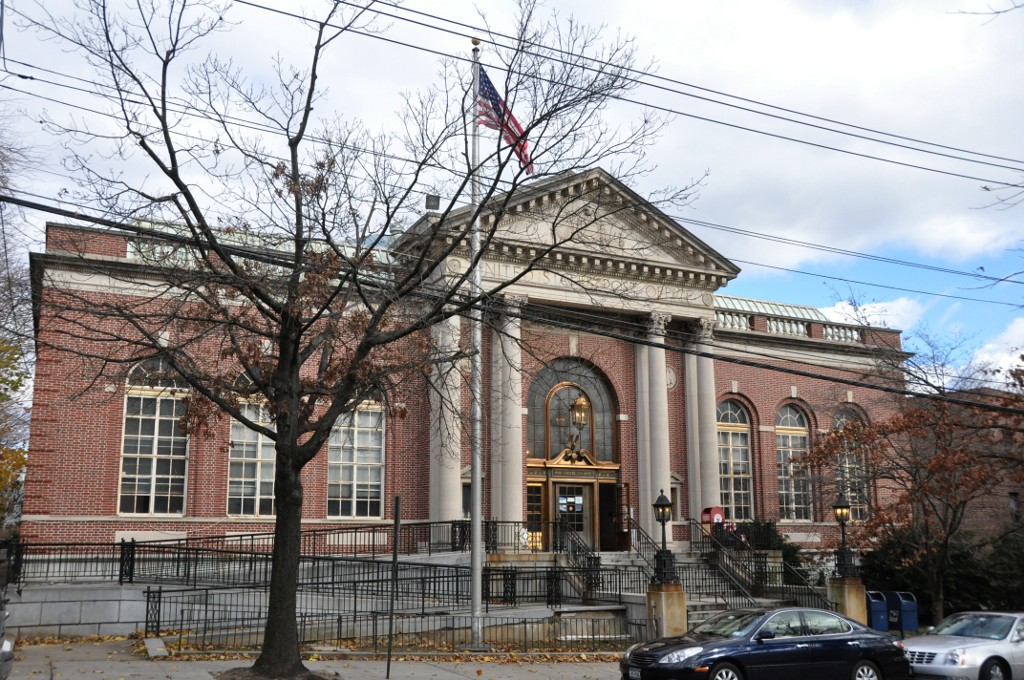
Port Chester Post Office

Port Chester's government comprises a mayor and seven trustees. The board and mayor also employ a professional village manager. The current mayor of Port Chester is Luis Marino (D).

=== Board of trustees ===
- Luis A. Marino - Mayor
- Philip Dorazio - Deputy Mayor
- Richard Abel - Trustee
- John Allen - Trustee
- Sylvia Dundon - Trustee
- George Ford - Trustee
- Nancy F. Naulaguari - Trustee

Stuart L. Rabin serves as village manager.

Local elections in Port Chester occur in March. As part of a 2009 U.S. Justice Department consent decree, Port Chester employed cumulative voting for trustee positions. The decree expired in 2016, and after exploring voting options for elections scheduled for March 2019, Port Chester adopted cumulative voting in its charter by popular referendum in 2018. The mayor continues to be elected at large.

=== Voting ===
To enforce the Voting Rights Act of 1965, the Justice Department brought a lawsuit in 2006 to compel the village government to change from an allegedly racially discriminatory at-large electoral system to one that was district-based. This lawsuit would halt the March 2007 elections until the village developed an acceptable plan. In its December 15, 2006, complaint the Justice Department wrote, "the current at-large system for electing members of the Port Chester Board of Trustees results in Hispanic citizens having less opportunity than white citizens to participate in the political process and to elect candidates of their choice to the Port Chester Board of Trustees." Local Latino activist Cesar Ruiz, State Assemblyman Peter Rivera, and National Institute for Latino Policy President Angelo Falcón held a news conference on Martin Luther King Jr.'s birthday (January 15, 2007) to display support for the Justice Department's lawsuit and the need to reform the village's electoral system.

The village board of trustees passed a resolution on December 4, 2006, expressing its disagreement with the Department of Justice's decision that the village must reform its election system, claiming that the problem was not discrimination but rather "apathy" in the Hispanic community. Federal authorities believed that the village's "at large" voting system denied Hispanics representation on the board of trustees and the board of education. According to Reuters, "All voters in town elect each board member, whereas dividing the town into six electoral districts would give Hispanics a majority in at least one of them because they are largely concentrated in one area of town, the suit said." Although Latinos make up a significant portion of Port Chester's population, none had ever been elected to the board of trustees or school board.

On March 2, 2007, federal court judge Stephen C. Robinson ruled in favor of the Department of Justice and placed an injunction on the upcoming trustee elections. This ruling did not affect the mayoral election, but was expected to result in Port Chester being broken into election districts. Instead, village officials came up with an alternative plan to address the problem by using cumulative voting. Robinson approved this plan on November 6, 2009.

=== U.S. Post Office ===
Port Chester's United States Post Office is a historic building on Westchester Avenue. It was designed by consulting architects Zoller and Muller for the Office of the Supervising Architect, built in 1932–1933, and listed on the National Register of Historic Places in 1989. It is a symmetrical, one-story building faced with brick and trimmed in limestone and granite in the Colonial Revival style. The front facade features a projecting central pavilion with a shallow portico composed of two pairs of limestone Corinthian columns echoed by Corinthian pilasters.

The lobby features an array of four large New Deal murals and nine slightly smaller lunettes, designed by Domenico Mortellito with Treasury Relief Art Project (TRAP) funding and installed in 1936. They depict a wide range of human activities, including firefighting, shipbuilding, baking, iron working, medicine, music, and teaching.

== Parks and recreation ==
Port Chester has at least six parks, together totaling nearly 50 acres (0.20 km^{2}):

- Abendroth Park: a 10.1-acre park that includes a section for dogs.
- Columbus Park: a 9.4-acre park east of Ryan Avenue, west of I-95, and north of Fox Island. It has one basketball and two volleyball courts, one large and one small playground, a picnic pavilion with grills, a seasonal water spray playground, and an artificial turf soccer field. Bathroom facilities are available.
- Crawford Park: owned by the town of Rye. The park is used for soccer, T-ball, and softball.
- Edgewood Park: a 3.2-acre park with one youth baseball field and small playground structure.
- Joseph Curtis Recreation Park: a 7.5-acre park north of downtown, not far from Lyon Park. It is bounded by Putnam Drive on the west, Locust Avenue on the east, and Willett Avenue on the south. It has a small playground structure, an adult-size baseball field and batting cage, a roller-skating rink, and bocce courts with fencing and lighting. Bathroom facilities are available.
- Lyon Park: a 20.3-acre park that contains two Little League fields, a playground, and the historic Bush-Lyon Homestead. The park is bounded by Putnam Avenue, King Street, and Parkway Drive.

The Bush-Lyon Homestead, Capitol Theater, Life Savers Building, Putnam and Mellor Engine and Hose Company Firehouse, St. Peter's Episcopal Church, and United States Post Office are listed on the National Register of Historic Places.

== Transportation ==
The Bee-Line Bus System provides bus service to Port Chester on routes 13 and 61.

Connecticut Transit Stamford Division provides bus service to Port Chester on routes 311 and 311B. The 13 was combined with the southern portion of the former 76 route on December 31, 2011.

Metro-North Railroad's Port Chester train station is on the New Haven Line, and provides commuter rail service to Grand Central Terminal in New York City and to Stamford Transportation Center and New Haven-Union Station in Connecticut.

== Notable people ==
- John Abercrombie, jazz guitarist
- Jon Alpert, reporter and documentary filmmaker
- Lex Barker, film actor, famous for playing Tarzan
- Herman Barron (1909–1978), professional golfer
- Keter Betts, jazz double bass player
- Nick Bianco, Amateur motocross racer
- Edson Buddle, soccer player
- Jackie Carter, children's book editor and author
- William W. Cook, legal scholar and major benefactor of the University of Michigan Law School
- Paul Costa, professional football player
- Luigi Del Bianco, chief carver of Mount Rushmore
- Elliot del Borgo, composer
- Arnold Diaz, journalist for Fox 5 News
- Aaron Sabato, 2020 MLB First Round Pick by the Minnesota Twins
- Meaghan Francella, LPGA player
- Kenneth R. Force, musician, band director, and composer
- George Gallo, screenwriter and filmmaker
- Arnold Gamson, conductor
- Doug Grean, musician and producer
- Adam Haslett, writer and winner of the PEN/Malamud Award
- Jean Holzworth, veterinarian
- Rob Ianello, University of Akron football coach
- E.L. Konigsburg, author, illustrator, Newbery Award winner
- Ferdinand Kramer, architect of Greyrock Park and Alden Estates 1939/1940 to 1945
- Joe Langworth, Broadway performer, choreographer and director
- Frank E. "Lank" Leonard, cartoonist and creator of the Mickey Finn comic strip
- Val Lewton, writer and producer
- Barry Lopez, writer, National Book Award winner
- D. J. MacHale, American writer, director, and executive producer
- Robert W. McKnight, Florida state legislator, businessman, and writer
- Terrence McNally, Playwright, librettist, and screenwriter
- Brian Moran, professional baseball player
- Colin Moran, professional baseball player
- Andy Newmark, rock and funk drummer
- Leslie R. Nicholas, businessman and Pacific War veteran
- Richard Ogilvie, Governor of Illinois 1968–1972
- Frank Pavone, Roman Catholic priest
- Ruth Roberts, songwriter
- Saul Rosen, computer scientist
- André Roy, NHL player
- Rachael Sage, singer-songwriter
- Carl Schmehl, director and producer
- Pierre da Silva, soccer player
- Ed Sullivan, entertainer
- Art Tomassetti, record-setting test pilot
- David Tutera, celebrity wedding planner
- Anthony Vincent, YouTuber and musician
- Peter J. Vita, holder of the world record for the longest working career as a barber
- Edward B. Wesley, co-founder of The New York Times

== Sister cities ==
Port Chester is twinned with:

- Jingzhou, Hubei in China (2000–present)
- Portchester, Hampshire in England (2010–present)
- Uruguaiana, Rio Grande do Sul in Brazil (2025–present)

== See also ==
- Mamaroneck (village), New York
- Rye Brook, New York
