= Caroline A. Crenshaw =

American lawyer

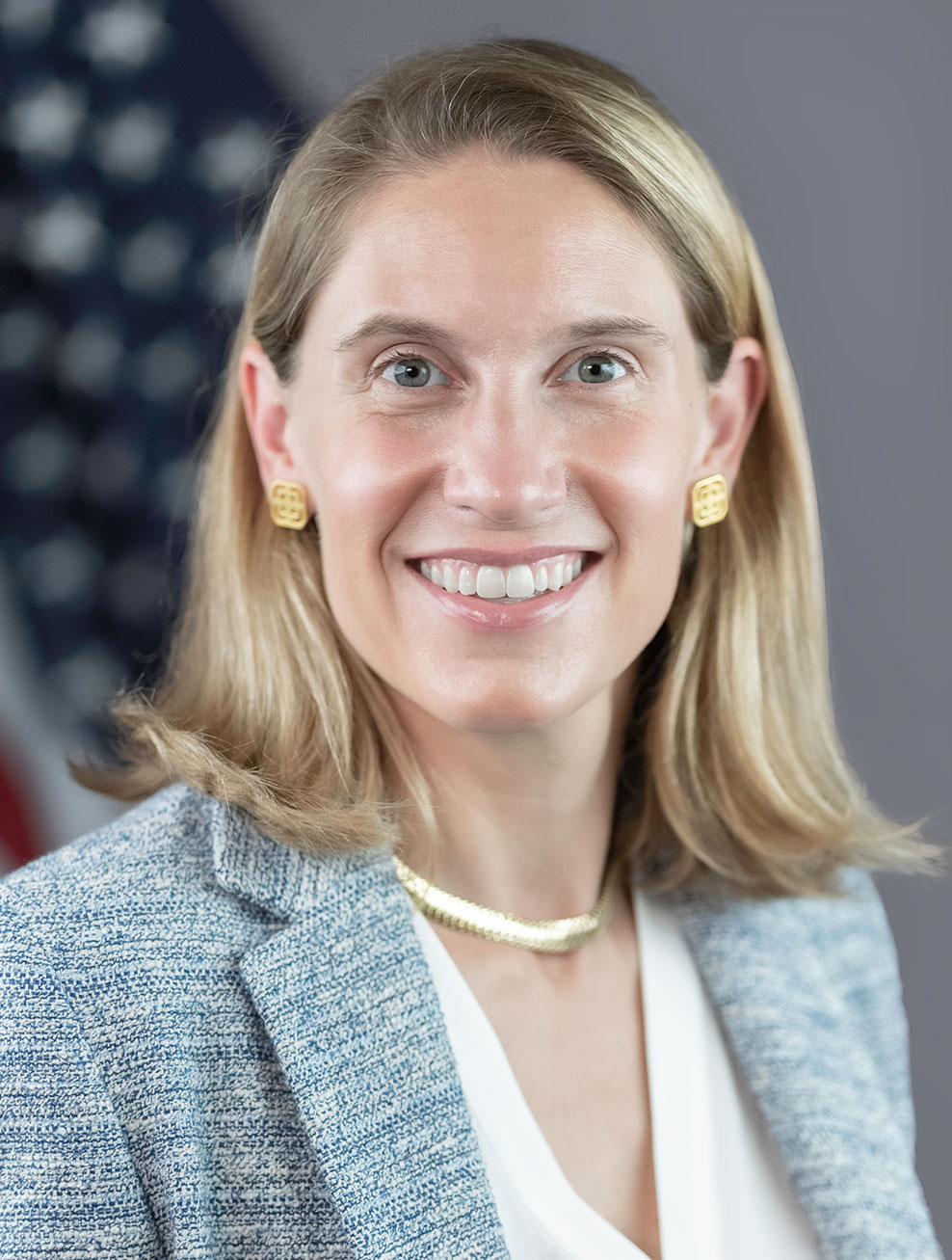

Commissioner of the United States Securities and Exchange Commission
- In office August 17, 2020 – January 3, 2026
- President: Donald Trump; Joe Biden; Donald Trump
- Preceded by: Robert J. Jackson Jr.
- Succeeded by: vacant

Personal details
- Party: Democratic
- Education: Harvard University (AB); University of Minnesota (JD)

Military service
- Allegiance: United States
- Branch/service: United States Army
- Rank: Major
- Unit: J.A.G. Corps

Caroline Abbey Crenshaw is an American attorney who served as a commissioner of the U.S. Securities and Exchange Commission.

== Education ==
Crenshaw received her Bachelor of Arts, cum laude from Harvard College in 2004 and her Juris Doctor, magna cum laude, from the University of Minnesota Law School in 2009.

== Career ==
Crenshaw practiced law in the Washington, D.C. office of Sutherland Asbill & Brennan LLP. At Sutherland, she represented public companies, broker-dealers, and investment advisers on complex securities law investigations and enforcement matters. She attended The JAG School at the University of Virginia and entered U.S. Army JAG Corps. She currently serves as a major in the U.S. Army Judge Advocate General's Corps.

=== U.S. Securities and Exchange Commission ===
Crenshaw joined the SEC in 2013 and has served in the Office of Compliance Inspections and Examinations, the Division of Investment Management, and as Counsel to Commissioners Kara Stein and Robert J. Jackson Jr. Her work has focused on legal and policy analysis related to corporate governance, investment management, enforcement, international regulation, and the oversight of self-regulatory organizations.

On June 18, 2020, President Trump announced his intent to nominate Crenshaw to serve as a Commissioner on the U.S. Securities and Exchange Commission. Her nomination was sent to the Senate later that day; President Trump nominated Crenshaw to the Democratic seat vacated by Robert J. Jackson Jr, whose term expired. She was confirmed by the Senate on August 6, 2020, by voice vote. Crenshaw was sworn in on August 17, 2020.

The U.S. Senate Banking Committee canceled Crenshaw’s renomination vote in December 2024.

== Personal life ==
She married Alexander Wysham Cole on February 17, 2018, at St. Mark's Episcopal Church in Washington, D.C.
