= American Automotive Equipment =

- Company type: Private
- Industry: Automotive Service Equipment
- Founded: 1969
- Headquarters: Port Chester, New York, United States
- Area served: North America
- Website: http://www.americanautomotiveequipment.com

American Automotive Equipment, also known as AAE, is a United States–based manufacturer, distributor, and seller of automotive service equipment. AAE is a privately held company, headquartered in Port Chester, New York.

== History ==
AAE was founded in 1969 as MZE, Inc. in the Northeastern United States as a distributor and service center for various manufacturers of automotive lifts and service equipment in the undercar sector.

As of 2012 AAE manufactured, distributed, and sold auto service equipment around the world. Its primary products included automotive lifts, wheel balancers, and tire changers. AAE claims a customer base of over 100,000 companies and individuals.

In 2004 AAE's U.S.-based manufacturing processes were internationalized. Three overseas cooperative ventures were established, tripling production capacity.

AAE's primary logistics facility is in Cleburne, Texas.
