= Rye Brook, New York =

- Village
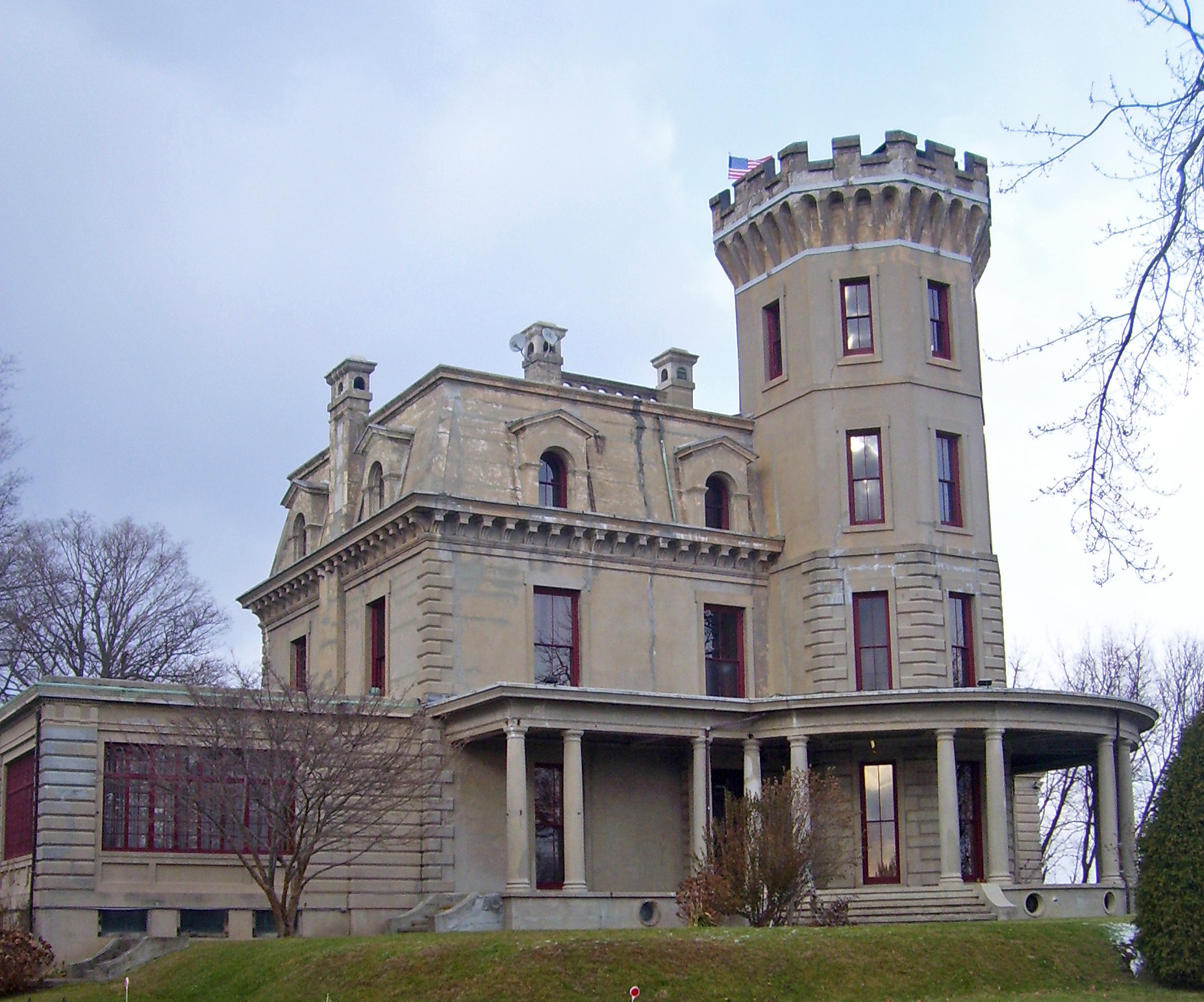
- Ward's Castle on the NY-CT state line

- Seal

- Location of Rye Brook, New York
- Coordinates: 41°1′11″N 73°41′0″W
- Country: United States
- State: New York
- County: Westchester
- Town: Rye
- Established: July 7, 1982; 44 years ago

Government
  - Mayor: Jason A. Klein

Area
  - Total: 3.45 sq mi (8.94 km^{2})
  - Land: 3.43 sq mi (8.88 km^{2})
  - Water: 0.023 sq mi (0.06 km^{2}) 0.29%
- Elevation: 249 ft (76 m)

Population (2020)
  - Total: 10,047
  - Density: 2,930.5/sq mi (1,131.48/km^{2})
- Time zone: UTC-5 (EST)
  - Summer (DST): UTC-4 (EDT)
- ZIP code: 10573
- Area code: 914
- FIPS code: 36-64325
- GNIS feature ID: 0979940
- NWS SAME code: 036119
- Website: https://ryebrookny.gov/

Rye Brook is a village in Westchester County, New York, United States, within the town of Rye. As of the 2020 census, Rye Brook had a population of 10,047. Rye Brook is located in southeastern Westchester County and shares its eastern border with Greenwich, Connecticut. The village was an unincorporated section of the town of Rye until its incorporation as a village on July 7, 1982.

Rye Brook has been designated as a Tree City USA for 14 years.

== History ==
Known as Mosier's Fight, a Revolutionary War skirmish took place on December 2, 1781, in the area of present-day Rye Brook: a small force of Westchester County militia commanded by Lieutenant William Mosier successfully repulsed an attack by a much larger British-aligned Loyalist unit of De Lancey's Cowboys. The fight was part of the ongoing, brutal guerrilla warfare between Loyalist and Patriot militias in the Neutral Ground of Westchester County.

In 1982, 150 residents of the unincorporated area proposed to establish the village of Rye Brook and organized a petition containing 1,536 signatures. The petition drive, which contained the signatures of approximately 36% of the registered voters in the unincorporated area, was organized by the Independent Civic Association. It was reported by The New York Times that one resident commented, "There is a time for a community to redefine itself," further stating that residents of the unincorporated area "should be able to elect their own officers" and "protect their tax base."

The residents of the unincorporated area voted on June 23, 1982, to create the Village of Rye Brook. It was the first village created in New York State in 54 years. The referendum to create the new political identity passed with 58% of the voters in favor (1,991 to 1,434). The first election in the Village's history was held to elect a mayor and four trustees. The first village official was Lee Russillo, who was sworn in as Rye Brook's first Village Clerk, and was responsible for the first election day.

The village is home to the William E. Ward House, which was added to the National Register of Historic Places in 1976. Also known as Ward's Castle, it was the home of the National Cartoon Museum, established by Mort Walker, the creator of Beetle Bailey, from 1976 to 1992.

In 1983, 800 Westchester Avenue, described as the "Taj Mahal of Rye Brook" and the "contemporary equivalent to the classical villa," was constructed as the General Foods Corporate Headquarters.

== Geography ==
Rye Brook is located at 41°1′11″N 73°41′0″W (41.019767, -73.683419).

According to the United States Census Bureau, the village has a total area of 3.5 square miles (9.1 km^{2}), all land.

== Demographics ==
Historical population
Census	Pop.	Note	%±
1990	7,765		—
2000	8,602		10.8%
2010	9,347		8.7%
2020	10,047		7.5%
U.S. Decennial Census

=== 2020 census ===
As of the 2020 census, Rye Brook had a population of 10,047. The median age was 44.4 years. 23.0% of residents were under the age of 18 and 20.0% of residents were 65 years of age or older. For every 100 females there were 91.1 males, and for every 100 females age 18 and over there were 86.0 males age 18 and over.

100.0% of residents lived in urban areas, while 0.0% lived in rural areas.

There were 3,533 households in Rye Brook, of which 37.7% had children under the age of 18 living in them. Of all households, 64.8% were married-couple households, 8.5% were households with a male householder and no spouse or partner present, and 23.8% were households with a female householder and no spouse or partner present. About 19.6% of all households were made up of individuals and 13.1% had someone living alone who was 65 years of age or older.

There were 3,723 housing units, of which 5.1% were vacant. The homeowner vacancy rate was 1.4% and the rental vacancy rate was 3.5%.

Racial composition as of the 2020 census
Race	Number	Percent
White	7,399	73.6%
Black or African American	178	1.8%
American Indian and Alaska Native	56	0.6%
Asian	746	7.4%
Native Hawaiian and Other Pacific Islander	0	0.0%
Some other race	738	7.3%
Two or more races	930	9.3%
Hispanic or Latino (of any race)	1,612	16.0%

=== 2000 census ===
As of the census of 2000, there were 8,602 people, 3,122 households, and 2,435 families residing in the village. The population density was 2,479.0 inhabitants per square mile (957.1/km^{2}). There were 3,224 housing units at an average density of 929.1 per square mile (358.7/km^{2}). The racial makeup of the village was 91.96% White, 1.03% African American, 0.21% Native American, 4.25% Asian, 0.02% Pacific Islander, 1.36% from other races, and 1.16% from two or more races. Hispanic or Latino of any race were 5.44% of the population.

There were 3,122 households, out of which 37.6% had children under the age of 18 living with them, 68.4% were married couples living together, 7.3% had a female householder with no husband present, and 22.0% were non-families. 18.8% of all households were made up of individuals, and 9.6% had someone living alone who was 65 years of age or older. The average household size was 2.72 and the average family size was 3.09.

In the village, the population was spread out, with 25.5% under the age of 18, 3.8% from 18 to 24, 27.9% from 25 to 44, 25.5% from 45 to 64, and 17.3% who were 65 years of age or older. The median age was 41 years. For every 100 females, there were 90.2 males. For every 100 females age 18 and over, there were 87.4 males.

== Parks and recreation ==
Rye Brook residents have access to the historic Rye Town Park-Bathing Complex and Oakland Beach through the town of Rye, although the complex is located in the city of Rye, a separate municipality.

Rye Brook has six main parks totaling nearly 100 acres (0.40 km^{2}):

- Pine Ridge Park: Contains two little league fields, four tennis courts, two basketball courts, and a playground. The park is located on the corner of Latonia Road and Mohegan Lane.
- Garabaldi Park: Has two basketball courts, one tennis court, a Little League field, and a playground. Garibaldi Park stands on Garibaldi Place opposite to the Anthony J. Posillipo Community Center.
- Harkness Park: This park contains four tennis courts and is the home of Blind Brook Tennis. Harkness lies next to Blind Brook High School.
- Rye Hills Park: This park, which is next to Crawford Park, has a walking trail, game tables, a basketball court, and a lookout towards Long Island Sound.
- Rye Brook-King Street Athletic Fields: This park contains a soccer/football/lacrosse/field hockey field and a softball field. These fields are made of artificial turf, rather than traditional grass fields. These are the first artificial turf fields built in the village. Ground was broken for the project in the fall of 2005 and construction was completed in September 2006. The scoreboard and bathroom/storage facilities were completed in October 2006. These fields are located next to Blind Brook High School on King Street. Parking for the fields are at the High School and a stairway has been built as an accessway to the fields from the high school.
- Crawford Park is owned by the Town of Rye. The park is used for soccer, tee-ball, and softball by the village. There is a walking path along the perimeter of the park which is very popular among dog walkers and joggers alike.

The village has two alternative passive parks:

- Magnolia Park: This park has an open grass field.
- Rich Manor Park: This site is an open field and has views of Blind Brook.

== Economy ==
=== Personal income ===
The median income for a household in the village was $98,864, and the median income for a family was $111,287. Males had a median income of $75,712 versus $45,698 for females. The per capita income for the village was $48,617. About 1.8% of families and 2.9% of the population were below the poverty line, including 1.0% of those under age 18 and 1.4% of those age 65 or over.

=== Industry ===
Universal American is headquartered in Rye Brook. Formerly, Snapple and Kraft Foods had their headquarters in the village.

WRNN-TV is an independent television station with its headquarters located at 800 Westchester Avenue.

== Government ==
The village of Rye Brook is governed by a mayor and a five-member Board of Trustees, all volunteers. Jason Klein is the current mayor. The board appoints a village administrator who runs day-to-day operations in the city. Rye Brook has its own police and fire departments. The police department, led by a chief of police, consists of 28 officers and one support staffer. The fire department operates one firehouse, and the Port Chester Fire Department has a contract with the village to respond to calls. Port Chester's fire chief also oversees the Rye Brook police department.

On the federal level, Rye Brook is located in the New York's 17th congressional district. On the state level, Rye Brook is located in the 36th State Senate district and the 85th State Assembly district. On the county level, Rye Brook is located with the 6th Westchester County Board of Legislators district.

== Education ==
Within the village lie two school districts, the Port Chester-Rye Union Free School District and the Blind Brook School District. Blind Brook makes up approximately 70% of the village and Port Chester covers the remaining 30%.

- Blind Brook High School is the only high school in the Blind Brook School District.
- Port Chester High School is the only high school in the Port Chester–Rye Union Free School District.

== Media ==
- The Journal News, covering all of Westchester, Rockland, and Putnam counties.
- The Westmore News, covering Rye Brook & Port Chester (closed in December 2024)

== Infrastructure ==
=== Transportation ===
Commuters have the option of using the Westchester County–operated Bee-Line Bus System.

Part of the Westchester County Airport is located in the northern part of the village.

Major roads that serve the area include, in the northern part of the village:

- Hutchinson River Parkway

In the southern part of the village:

- Interstate 287
- I-95 / New England Thruway

Other major routes include:

- NY 120
- NY 120A

=== Flood control ===
The Bowman Avenue Dam, a project to mitigate flooding in the area, is located within the village.

== Notable people ==
- Craig Bierko (b. 1964) — American actor and singer
- Ralph Branca (1926–2016) — Brooklyn Dodgers pitcher, 1944–1953, 1956
- William Carlucci (b. 1967) — American rower
- Donald Fehr (b. 1948) — former executive director of the Major League Baseball Players Association and the National Hockey League Players' Association
- Dorothy Gilman (1923–2012) — writer, best known for the Mrs. Pollifax mysteries
- Joshua Harmon (b. 1983) — playwright, grew up in Rye Brook
- Dan McDonnell — head baseball coach at Louisville
- Aaron Sabato (b. 1999) — first baseman in the Minnesota Twins
- David Zaslav (b. 1960) — CEO of Warner Bros. Discovery

== See also ==
- Port Chester
- Mamaroneck/Rye Neck
