= United States Post Office (Port Chester, New York) =

- US Post Office-Port Chester
- U.S. National Register of Historic Places
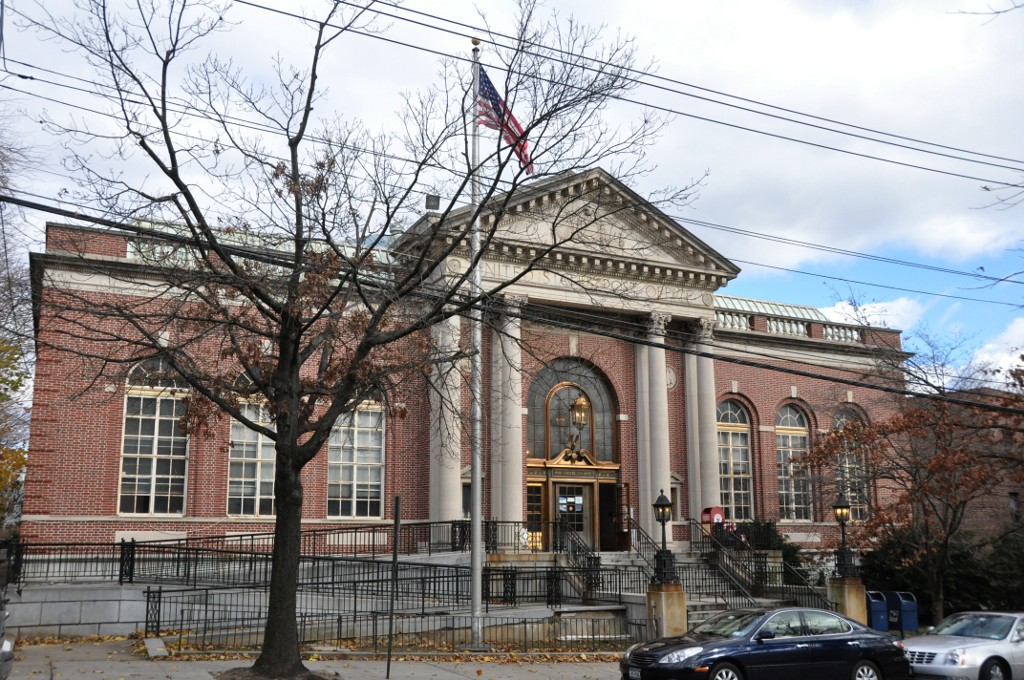
- U.S. Post Office, Port Chester, NY, November 2012

- Location within New York Location within the United States
- Location: 245 Westchester Ave., Port Chester, New York
- Coordinates: 41°0′11.5″N 73°40′6″W
- Area: less than one acre
- Built: 1932
- Architect: Zoller & Muller; Mortellito, Domenico
- Architectural style: Colonial Revival
- MPS: US Post Offices in New York State, 1858-1943, TR
- NRHP reference No.: 88002406
- Added to NRHP: May 11, 1989

US Post Office-Port Chester is a historic post office building located at Port Chester in Westchester County, New York. It was designed by consulting architects Zoller and Muller for the Office of the Supervising Architect, built in 1932–1933, and was listed on the National Register of Historic Places in 1989. It is a one-story symmetrical building faced with brick and trimmed in limestone and granite in the Colonial Revival style. The front facade features a projecting central pavilion with a shallow portico composed of two pairs of limestone Corinthian columns echoed by Corinthian pilasters. The lobby features four large murals and nine lunettes, designed by Domenico Mortellito and installed in 1936.

It was listed on the National Register of Historic Places in 1989.

== Gallery ==
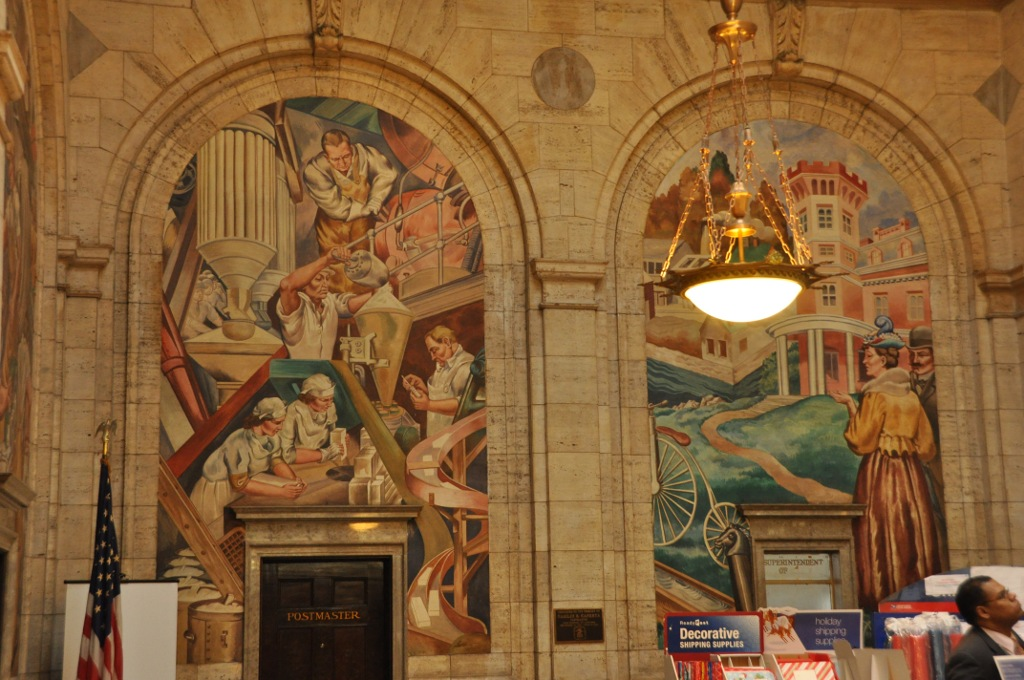
Murals inside the main hall

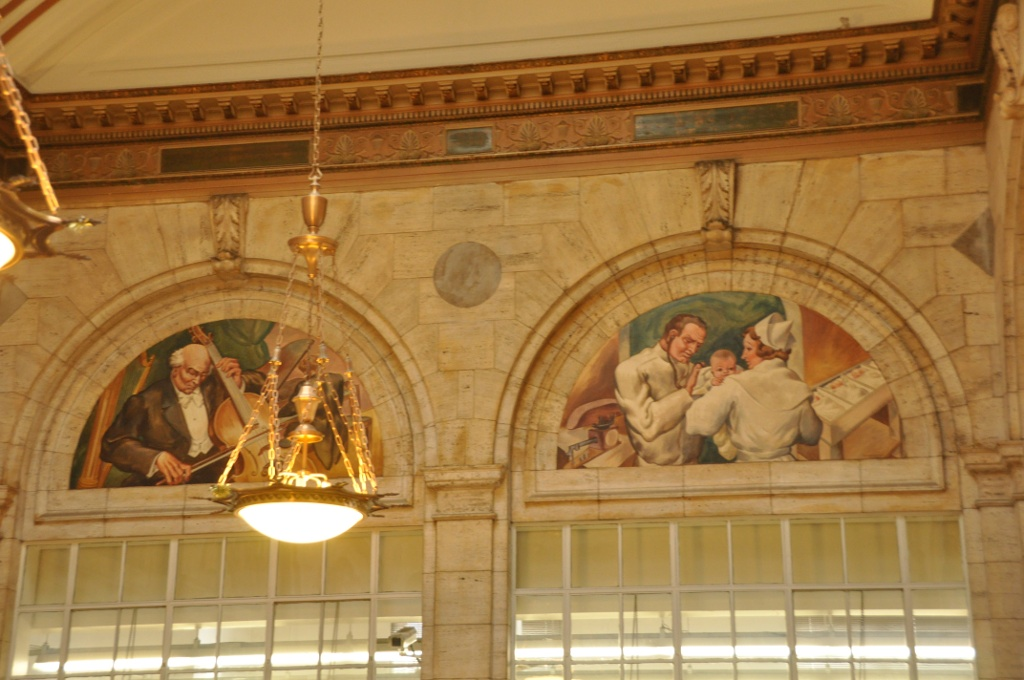
Murals inside the main hall

== See also ==
- National Register of Historic Places listings in southern Westchester County, New York
