= Peter J. Vita =

American barber (1910–2004)

Peter J. Vita (April 30, 1910 – January 7, 2004) of Port Chester, New York, held the world record for the longest working career as a barber.

Vita started cutting hair professionally in 1922, starting his career in his father's barbershop when he was twelve years old. He opened his own barbershop in 1930 and worked actively as a barber for 81 years until suffering a stroke in late 2003. In October 2003, he was recognized by the Guinness Book of World Records as the longest-practicing barber in the world. The previous holder of the record had worked as a barber for 76 years.
