= Carl Schmehl =

American stage director and producer

Carl Schmehl is an American stage director, choreographer and producer. He is the artistic director of The Manhattan Plaza Theatre Project in New York City and the artistic director of the nonprofit Nantucket-based theater group "On The Isle" ontheisle.org. Carl is also the creative director of The Shackman Group, an events a management company in New York City, a position he held for the past fifteen years. [www.shackmanny.com] Schmehl lives in New York City.

== Theater ==
Schmehl attended Emerson College. He started his show business career working with the national touring companies of Sugar Babies starring Carol Channing, Annie, A Chorus Line and Woman of the Year, starring Lauren Bacall.

Schmehl began a twenty-year association with composer Charles Strouse when he directed Strouse's opera Nightingale in Boston, Massachusetts. Schmehl had a six-month run with the Broadway production of Joseph and the Amazing Technicolor Dreamcoat and worked for one year as audition choreographer for the show's national tour. He was stage manager and casting director for the Off-Broadway musical When Pigs Fly and part of the producing team for the Radio City Music Hall's Christmas Spectacular.

His most recent theatre credits include director and choreographer of productions of Nunsense, The Actor's Nightmare, The Pirates of Penzance, Up in the Rafters, and the off-Broadway play Almost Live from the Betty Ford Clinic. Schmehl has assisted Broadway director and choreographer Gillian Lynne on productions in New York, San Diego, London and Vienna. Most recently, he assistant directed Lynne's production of the musical Dear World in London's West End.

Schmehl's directing and choreography credits include The Bad Boy Club (Key West Theatre Festival), Rockwell (Maine and Port Chester, New York), The Aluminum Garden (Off-Broadway), It's All in the Book (Boston's Wang Center), Hello Dolly!, Tampa II (Tampa Bay Performing Arts Center), Vincentennial (Boston's Cutler Majestic Theatre), Follies (Bangor Opera House), and benefits for the American Cancer Society (Charleston), United Cerebral Palsy (Tulsa), Good Samaritan's Bob Hope Awards, and others.

== Events ==
In the event industry, Schmehl has presented New York events and Industrials including: The Spiderman DVD release Party, "Fridays" 50th anniversary, Montefiore Hospitals 2017 gala, GT Nexus, Hilton Corporation, The Panasonic International Awards, Prudential At the Plaza, WPO, Johnson Controls, Outward Bound, Hershey, opening nights of Broadway's Gypsy, the movies Once Around, Havana, events for TiVo, Universal Studios, Yahoo! Dr. Pepper, New York Life, CNN, NBC, Hilton, Fox, MTV, Leading hotels of the World/Relais & Chateaux, Google, AMEX, Volkswagen, WBGO and Kiel's. He is Creative Director of Shackman Events, a division of Shackman Associates, a destination management and event company in New York.

== Film and other credits ==
Schmehl has had several cameo roles in Hollywood films. He was hit by a taxicab in the film Ghostbusters, punched out in the film Heart with Brad Davis, and turned down for a date by Molly Ringwald in The Pick-up Artist. He has also performed for the Desert Storm troops at McDill Air Force Base, is listed in Who's Who in Entertainment, and was featured in an article "hot shots" in the New York Daily News.
