= Blind Brook School District =

Public school district in New York state, U.S.

Blind Brook-Rye UFSD

Location
- 390 North Ridge Street; Rye Brook, New York 10573 United States
- Coordinates: 41.03053°N 73.682068°W

District information
- Type: Public (government funded)
- Motto: Schools of Excellence
- Grades: K–12
- Superintendent: Dr. Brian J. Alm
- Schools: 3
- Budget: $43,915,067 (2017–2018 school year)
- NCES District ID: 3624630

Students and staff
- Students: 1,439
- Teachers: 150 (on an FTE basis)
- Student–teacher ratio: 9.59
- Athletic conference: Section 1, Class C
- Colors: Blue and white

Other information
- Website: www.blindbrook.org

The Blind Brook School District, officially known as the Blind Brook-Rye Union Free School District, is a public school district that serves approximately 1,439 students in Rye Brook, New York, in Westchester County, United States. Before it was known as the Blind Brook School District, it was called District 5.

The Superintendent of Schools is Dr. Brian J. Alm.

The district serves about 70% of the area of Rye Brook; the remainder is in the Port Chester School District. All of the district is within a portion of the Town of Rye.

== Board of education ==
The Board of Education (BOE) is made up of five members who reside in the Blind Brook School District. An election is held each May to elect members to the BOE and to vote on the school district's budget.

== Demographics and instruction ==
As of 2000 the district had 1,108 students and a 12 to 1 student to faculty ratio. Dr. James B. Van Hoven, the superintendent, said that district students are within "a high-powered academic program in a very intimate setting", and described the scenario as being "like a private school.". In October 2017, the district enrollment was 1,439 students with an additional 80 students attending out-of-district schools.

According to a US News Report from 2016, Blind Brook is ranked #32 in New York State and #177 Nationally. The AP participation rate as of 2016 is 81%.

== Schools ==
The Blind Brook School District houses three schools in two buildings across the district (Middle and High School on same campus).

=== The Bruno M. Ponterio Ridge Street Elementary School ===
The Bruno M. Ponterio Ridge Street Elementary School serves kindergarten to 5th grade. The building was renamed in the late 1990s in honor of long-time building principal and Rye Brook resident, Bruno M. Ponterio. He was the principal for about 25 years.

The current principal is Tracy Taylor. The associate principal is Lori Cutrone. The building was the first built by the Blind Brook School District, and was erected in the 1950s. Before the current building was built, a mansion standing on the property housed the school. The mansion was used as classrooms before and while the school building was built. Grades 1,2, 7 and 8 were in that building and 3, 4, 5 and 6 were in a brick building further up the road. It was part of a gift to the school district by the Lehman family. Lehman was a prominent legal figure in New York. The principal at that time was Myrtle Ansel. Teachers were Ms's Greavy, Kohler, Eton and Messrs Bonanno and Ralph. Mr Hager was the groundsman and lived with his family on the property.

Before the creation of Blind Brook High School in 1973, the elementary school housed the entire Blind Brook School District and contained grades K through 8. In 1973, the graduating 7th grade class from Ridge Street School in June became the 8th grade class at the new Blind Brook High School. As time progressed, Ridge Street School held grades K to 6th. When the middle school wing of the high school was built in 2002, the 6th grade was moved to the new building. That spring brought two graduations for the elementary school, as both the 5th and 6th grades moved on to the middle school.

In 2006, ground was broken on a new administration wing, and air conditioners were installed throughout the building. The construction marked the first additions to the building since the addition of the New Gym and a two-level classroom wing in the 1960s.

=== Blind Brook Middle School ===
Blind Brook Middle School houses grades 6th through 8th and is on the King Street Campus.

The principal is Patricia Lambert, after a few years in the High School she is back in the Middle School.

The first principal was Dr. Thomas Wolf. Dr. Wolf was key in the creation of the current middle school curriculum during his tenure at Blind Brook, from mid-2002 to 2007. He announced in early 2006 that he would retire on January 31, 2007.

A search for a new principal took place in 2006 and the Board of Education voted on a replacement prior to the end of the 2005–2006 school year. The replacement chosen was Karen Bronson, whose title, until Dr. Wolf retired, was "Principal on Special Assignment". She became the second principal of the middle school.

Bronson retired at the end of the 2010–2011 school year. A search process resulted in the hiring of Patricia Lambert as her replacement. Lambert took over as the third middle school principal in July 2011. In 2013, Lambert moved on to become principal of the high school. Todd Richard, who was serving as the assistant principal for the middle school and the high school, was appointed as the new middle school principal.

The middle school was originally composed of a hallway of classrooms and shared the entire building with the high school. As part of a district-wide bond referendum sparked by increasing enrollment, in 2002, a larger, two-story wing with a gymnasium, computer lab, and office space was built. This separated most daily activities of the middle school and high school, even though the two are still both under the same building.

In 2006 ground was broken on a new middle school wing which houses general education classrooms, science labs, a cafeteria, lockers, and a new faculty office room.

The middle school shares athletic facilities with the high school, along with the Monroe E. Haas Library and instructional media center, large group instruction, band room, auditorium, and cafeteria. State-of-the-art athletic fields were also constructed in 2006.

=== Blind Brook High School ===
Blind Brook High School was built in 1973 (renovated in 2002 and 2006) and houses grades 9 through 12. Prior to 1973, students who had graduated from Ridge Street Elementary School had to go to other high schools in the area, particularly Port Chester High School. According to a 2014 article in Newsweek Global, the college enrollment rate was in the 95th percentile and the on time graduation rate was in the 89th percentile. Blind Brook High School was named a National Blue Ribbon School in September 2016.

The principal is Patricia Lambert and the associate principal is Derek Schuelein.
