= Rye (town), New York =

Rye, New York
- Town
- Town of Rye
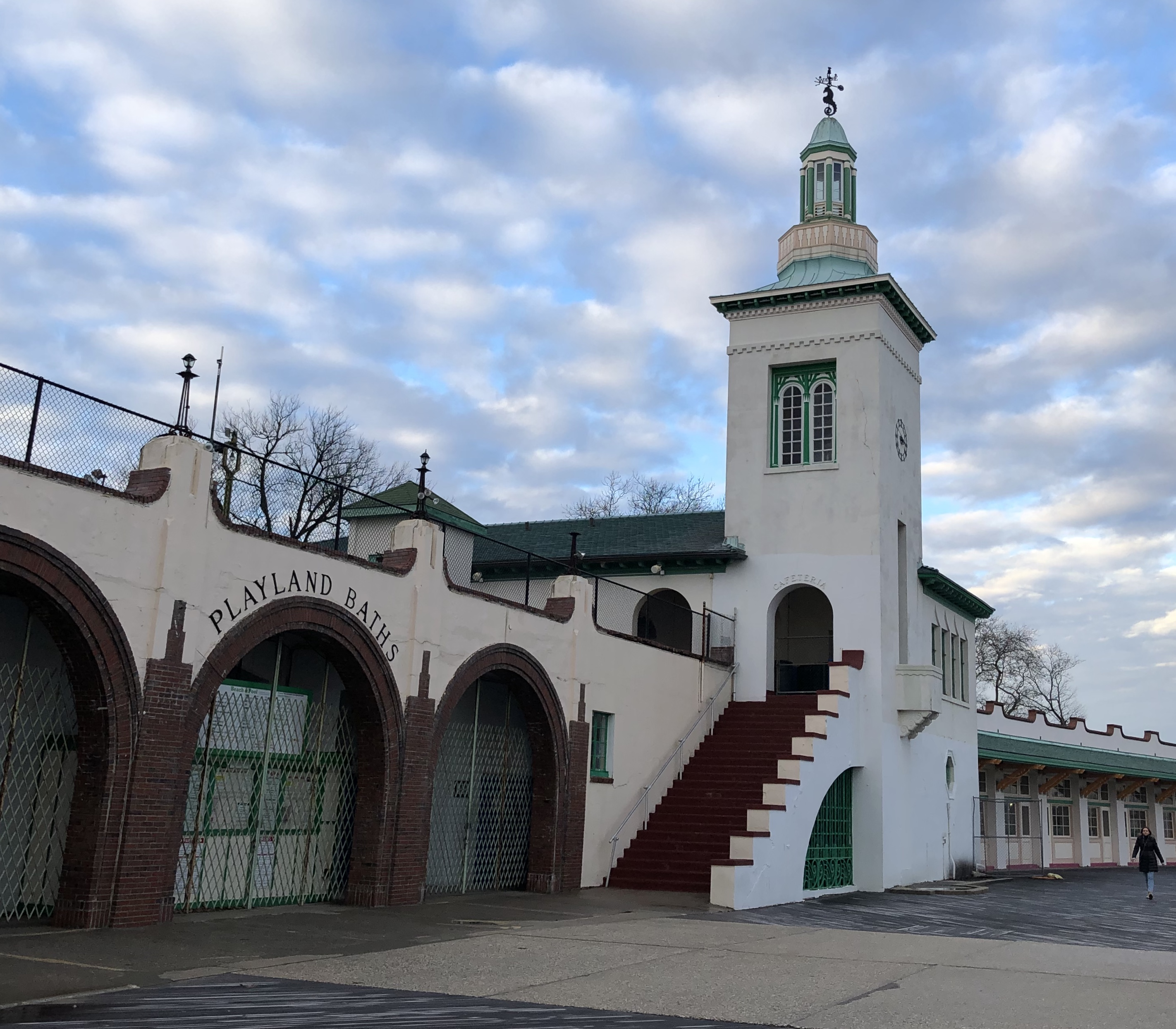
- Playland Park tower

- Seal

- Location of Rye (town), New York
- Coordinates: 41°01′04″N 73°40′30″W
- Country: United States
- State: New York
- County: Westchester

Government
  - Type: Manager-Council
  - Town Supervisor: Gary J. Zuckerman (D)
  - Town Council: Members: • William J. Villanova (Deputy Supervisor) (R); • Anthony Baxter Independent; • Thomas Nardi (D); • Lindsey Anne Jackson (R)

Area
  - Total: 7.34 sq mi (19.00 km^{2})
  - Land: 6.91 sq mi (17.89 km^{2})
  - Water: 0.42 sq mi (1.10 km^{2})

Population (2020)
  - Total: 49,613
  - Density: 7,181/sq mi (2,773/km^{2})
- Time zone: UTC-5 (Eastern (EST))
  - Summer (DST): UTC-4 (EDT)
- Area code: 914
- FIPS code: 36-119-64320
- Website: www.ryetownny.gov

Rye is a town in Westchester County, New York, United States. The population was 49,613 at the 2020 United States census over 45,928 at the 2010 census. It is a separate municipality from the city of Rye. The Town of Rye contains two villages – Port Chester and Rye Brook – and the Rye Neck section of the village of Mamaroneck (the remainder of the village of Mamaroneck is in the town of Mamaroneck). Port Chester, Rye Brook and Rye Neck comprise the entire area of the town of Rye.

== History ==
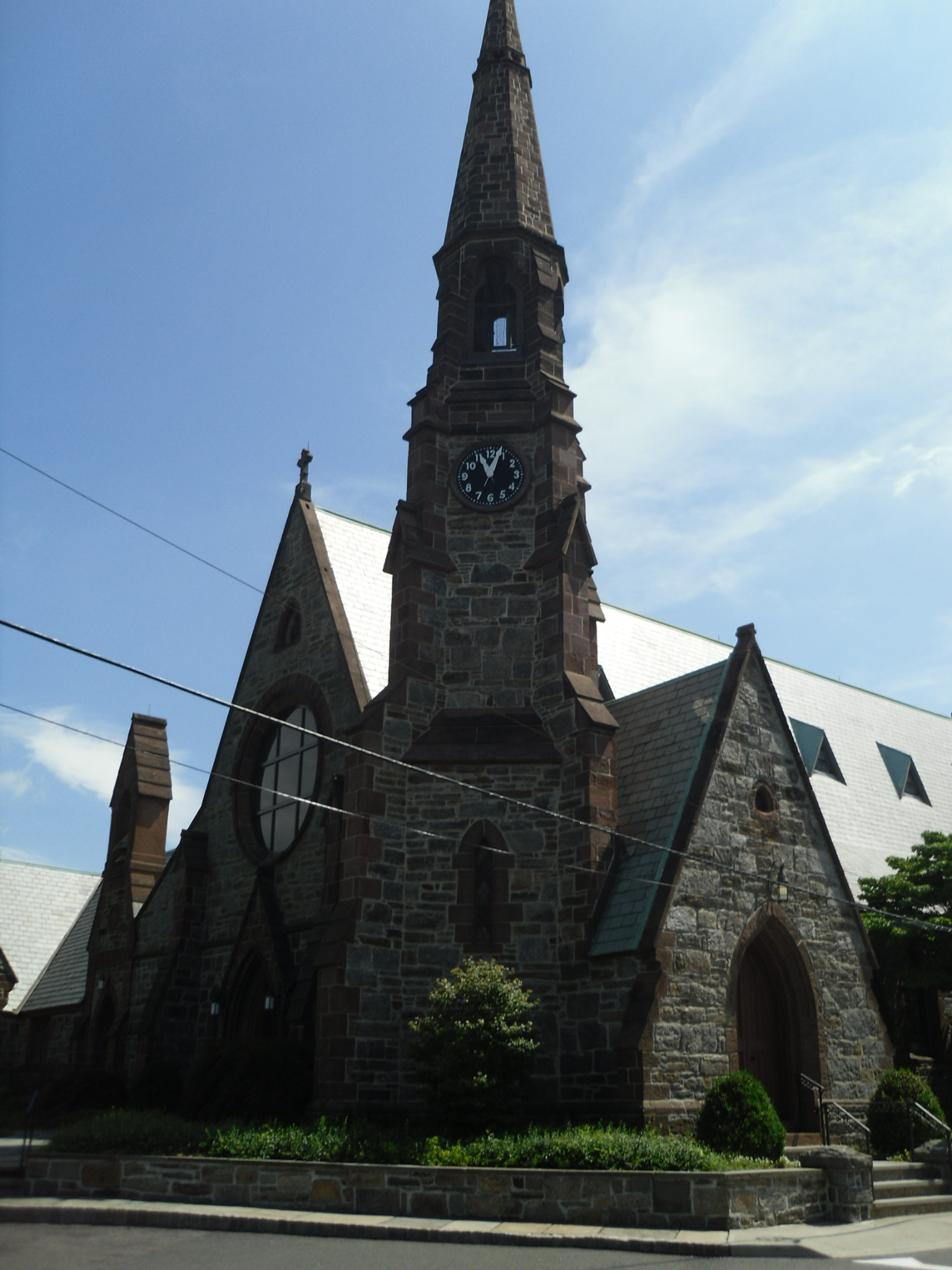

The town of Rye has its original roots on Manursing Island. On June 29, 1660, three settlers living in "Grenege" (now known as Greenwich, Connecticut), Thomas Studwell, John Coe, and Peter Disbrow, purchased Manursing Island (called Menussing by the Indians) from the Mohegan Indians. A tract of land lying between the Byram River and Blind Brook was sold by the Indians to Peter Disbrow on May 22, 1661. That year the four men were joined by John Budd, an original settler of Long Island (Southold) and, previously, New Haven. The four men bought additional lands from the Indians on June 2, 1662. The four men are regarded as the founders of Rye. Another settler, John Horton, purchased some additional lands. By 1662, the town of Hastings had 12 proprietors: Thomas Studwell, John Brondig, William Odell, Thomas Applebe, Philip Galpin, Richard Fowler, William Odell, Peter Disbrow, John Coe, Samuel Allen, Thomas Studwell and John Budd. A neighboring town named Hastings was merged into Rye in the 1660s, no later than 1666, as a 1666 sale of house by John Budd to a George Kniffen of Stratford for 37 pounds, ten shillings, was noted as having been conducted "by agreement of the men of Hastings, now called Rye." (Rye and Hastings are adjacent towns in East Sussex, England.)

The Connecticut Colony and the Province of New York both claimed the area, but in these early days, the colonists considered themselves to be under the protection of Connecticut. Connecticut formally ceded Rye to New York in 1683 as part of a boundary agreement, cementing the Connecticut Panhandle.

John Budd, who in 1663 was selected by the colonists to be its representative to the government of Connecticut, had purchased a large portion of land west of Blind Brook, an area called Apawquammis by the Indians, for the sum of eighty pounds sterling on November 8, 1661, one of three major land purchases by Budd from the Indians in the area that month. In 1666, Budd purchased yet another large parcel. By this time, other colonists had grown concerned at the size of Budd's holdings, and Budd's willingness to "settle people upon it", which they regarded as "extreamely prejuditial to the towne" of Rye. On October 2, 1668, nine inhabitants of Rye, apparently led by Peter Disbrow, petitioned the governor in Hartford to force Budd to sell some of his holdings to them. The petition failed, and Budd continued selling tracts to new settlers, as did his descendants. One such sale, in 1745, of 150 acres (0.61 km^{2}) was from another John Budd, a grandson of the founder, to Peter Jay, father of John Jay, subsequently the president of the Continental Congress, co-author with Alexander Hamilton and James Madison of The Federalist Papers, and Chief Justice of the United States, among other major distinctions.

The town grew and developed Poningo Neck, the current business district of the city of Rye, and finally the Saw Pit area, known today as Port Chester. Original roads, including the Post Road, King Street, and Grace Church Street, are some of the oldest roads, then carriage paths, that led residents in and out of the area.

The Rye Town Park-Bathing Complex and Oakland Beach, added to the National Register of Historic Places in 2003, is located in city of Rye but is accessible for residents of the town and its villages.

== Geography ==
According to the United States Census Bureau, the town has a total area of 7.3 square miles (19 km^{2}), of which 6.9 square miles (18 km^{2}) is land and 0.4 square miles (1.0 km^{2}), or 5.81%, is water.

The town of Rye consists of two discontiguous portions. The City of Rye separates the village of Mamaroneck (to the southwest) from the villages of Port Chester and Rye Brook (to the north and northeast). Rye Town is not to be mistaken with Rye City.

== Demographics ==
Historical population
Census	Pop.	Note	%±
1790	986		—
1810	1,278		—
1820	1,342		5.0%
1830	1,602		19.4%
1840	1,803		12.5%
1850	2,584		43.3%
1860	4,447		72.1%
1870	7,150		60.8%
1880	6,576		−8.0%
1890	9,477		44.1%
1900	12,861		35.7%
1910	19,652		52.8%
1920	25,819		31.4%
1930	37,495		45.2%
1940	40,135		7.0%
1950	32,796		−18.3%
1960	38,147		16.3%
1970	43,234		13.3%
1980	38,896		−10.0%
1990	39,524		1.6%
2000	43,880		11.0%
2010	45,928		4.7%
2020	49,613		8.0%
U.S. Decennial Census

As of the census of 2000, there were 43,880 people, 15,389 households, and 10,818 families residing in the town. The population density was 6,298.5 inhabitants per square mile (2,431.9/km^{2}). There were 15,813 housing units at an average density of 2,269.8 units per square mile (876.4 units/km^{2}). The racial makeup of the town was 71.30% White, 5.14% Black or African American, 0.35% Native American, 2.88% Asian, 0.04% Pacific Islander, 15.41% from other races, and 4.88% from two or more races. Hispanic or Latino of any race were 32.51% of the population.

There were 15,389 households, out of which 33.6% had children under the age of 18 living with them, 54.1% were married couples living together, 11.4% had a female householder with no husband present, and 29.7% were non-families. 24.3% of all households were made up of individuals, and 10.3% had someone living alone who was 65 years of age or older. The average household size was 2.82 and the average family size was 3.31.

23.5% of the town's population was under the age of 18, 8.5% were from 18 to 24, 33.3% were from 25 to 44, 20.7% were from 45 to 64, and 14.0% were 65 years of age or older. The median age was 36 years. For every 100 females, there were 98.4 males. For every 100 females age 18 and over, there were 95.3 males.

The median income for a household in the town was $56,675, and the median income for a family was $65,342. Males had a median income of $42,868 versus $36,875 for females. The per capita income for the town was $28,948. About 6.9% of families and 9.8% of the population were below the poverty line, including 10.5% of those under age 18 and 8.5% of those age 65 or over.

== Parks ==
The Town of Rye operates two parks.

- Crawford Park sits on 35.6 acres (144,000 m^{2}) in the village of Rye Brook. It contains soccer fields, a pavilion area, softball field, open fields, a playground, and the mansion.
- Rye Town Park/Oakland Beach is located along Forest Avenue in the city of Rye on sixty two acres of grasslands, forests, open fields, duck pond, and beach. It is next to Playland Park on Long Island Sound.

== See also ==
- Rye Brook
- Port Chester
- Mamaroneck
